= 1984 British Professional Championship =

Darts tournament

British Professional Championship

Tournament information
- Venue: Coatham Bowl
- Location: Redcar
- Country: England
- Organisation(s): BDO
- Format: Sets
- Month(s) Played: September

The 1984 British Professional Championship was a major darts tournament on the BDO/WDF calendar for 1984. It took place in late September at the Coatham Bowl, Redcar. It was broadcast on BBC Television.

The tournament featured 32 of the best players from around the world.

== Prize money ==
Total Prize fund was £29,600

- Champion £8,000
- Runner-up

== Results ==
First round (best of 5 sets)
(England) Mike Gregory	3
(Northern Ireland) John Weatherall	0
(England) Dave Lee	3
(Scotland) Rab Scott	0
(England) Cliff Lazarenko	3
(Wales) Leighton Rees	1
(Northern Ireland) Steve Brennan	3
(Scotland) Danny Cunningham	0
(England) Keith Deller	3
(England) Graham Collins	2
(England) Arnie Bunn	3
(Wales) Ken Thomas	1
(Scotland) Jocky Wilson	3
(Scotland) Peter Masson	1
(Republic of Ireland) P. J. Moylan	3
(England) Bobby George	2
(England) Dave Whitcombe	3
(England) Peter Chandler	2
(England) Alan Glazier	3
(Scotland) Tom McCrae	1
(England) John Lowe	3
(England) Chris Angel	0
(England) Gerry Haywood	3
(Scotland) Harry Patterson	0
(England) Bob Anderson	3
(Wales) Ceri Morgan	0
(Wales) Eric Burden	3
(Wales) Owen Thomas	2
(England) Lawrence Whitfield	3
(Wales) Peter Locke	2
(England) Eric Bristow	3
(England) Gary Lawrence	0

Second round (best of 7 sets)
(England) Mike Gregory	4
(England) Dave Lee	1
(England) Cliff Lazarenko	4
(Northern Ireland) Steve Brennan	1
(England) Keith Deller	2
(England) Arnie Bunn	4
(Scotland) Jocky Wilson	4
(Republic of Ireland) P. J. Moylan	1
(England) Dave Whitcombe	4
(England) Alan Glazier	2
(England) John Lowe	4
(England) Gerry Haywood	1
(England) Bob Anderson	4
(Wales) Eric Burden	3
(England) Lawrence Whitfield	2
(England) Eric Bristow	4

Quarter-finals (best of 9 sets)
(England) Mike Gregory	5
(England) Cliff Lazarenko	4
(England) Arnie Bunn	1
(Scotland) Jocky Wilson	5
(England) Dave Whitcombe	3
(England) John Lowe	5
(England) Bob Anderson	1
(England) Eric Bristow	5

Semi-finals (best of 11 sets)
(England) Mike Gregory	6
(Scotland) Jocky Wilson	4
(England) John Lowe	6
(England) Eric Bristow	3

Final (best of 13 sets)
(England) Mike Gregory	7
(England) John Lowe	5
