= 1986 British Professional Championship =

Darts tournament

British Professional Championship

Tournament information
- Venue: Coatham Bowl
- Location: Redcar
- Country: England
- Organisation(s): BDO
- Format: Sets
- Month(s) Played: September

The 1986 British Professional Championship was a major darts tournament on the BDO/WDF calendar for 1986. It took place in late September at the Coatham Bowl, Redcar. It was broadcast on BBC Television.

The tournament featured 32 of the best players from around the world.

== Prize money ==
Total Prize fund was £35,800

- Champion £10,000
- Runner-up £4,500

== Results ==
First round (best of 5 sets)
(England) Dave Whitcombe	3
(England) George Ewart	2
(England) Paul Clarkson	3
(Netherlands) Ronald Peel	1
(England) Cliff Lazarenko	3
(England) Bob Phillips	1
(England) Terry Collins	3
(England) Peter Taylor	1
(Wales) Peter Locke	3
(Scotland) Danny Cunningham	1
(Wales) Ceri Morgan	3
(England) Gil Graham	2
(England) Peter Evison	3
(England) John Lowe	1
(England) Kevin Kenny	3
(England) Dave Hepburn	1
(England) Bob Anderson	3
(England) Steve Gittins	0
(England) Denis Ovens	3
(England) David Jones	1
(Scotland) Jocky Wilson	3
(Australia) Terry O'Dea	1
(England) Alan Glazier	3
(Northern Ireland) Steve Brennan	1
(Scotland) Robert MacKenzie	3
(England) Dave Lee	2
(England) Keith Deller	3
(England) Eddie Garrett	2
(England) Mike Gregory	3
(England) Richard Smith	0
(England) Eric Bristow	3
(England) Ritchie Gardner	1

Second round (best of 7 sets)
(England) Dave Whitcombe	4
(England) Paul Clarkson	2
(England) Cliff Lazarenko	3
(England) Terry Collins	4
(Wales) Peter Locke	2
(Wales) Ceri Morgan	4
(England) Peter Evison	3
(England) Kevin Kenny	4
(England) Bob Anderson	4
(England) Denis Ovens	2
(Scotland) Jocky Wilson	4
(England) Alan Glazier	1
(Scotland) Robert MacKenzie	1
(England) Keith Deller	4
(England) Mike Gregory	4
(England) Eric Bristow	2

Quarter-finals (best of 9 sets)
(England) Dave Whitcombe	5
(England) Terry Collins	4
(Wales) Ceri Morgan	5
(England) Kevin Kenny	3
(England) Bob Anderson	4
(Scotland) Jocky Wilson	5
(England) Keith Deller	5
(England) Mike Gregory	3

Semi-finals (best of 11 sets)
(England) Dave Whitcombe	6
(Wales) Ceri Morgan	2
(Scotland) Jocky Wilson	6
(England) Keith Deller	1

Final (best of 13 sets)
(England) Dave Whitcombe	6
(Scotland) Jocky Wilson	7
