= 1985 British Professional Championship =

Darts tournament

British Professional Championship

Tournament information
- Venue: Coatham Bowl
- Location: Redcar
- Country: England
- Organisation(s): BDO
- Format: Sets
- Month(s) Played: September

The 1985 British Professional Championship was a major darts tournament on the BDO/WDF calendar for 1985. It took place in late September at the Coatham Bowl, Redcar. It was broadcast on BBC Television.

The tournament featured 32 of the best players from around the world.

== Prize money ==
Total Prize fund was £34,000

- Champion £9,000
- Runner-up £4,500

== Results ==
First round (best of 5 sets)
(England) Cliff Lazarenko	3
(Scotland) Robert MacKenzie	1
(England) Terry Collins	3
(England) Les Muirhead	0
(England) Ken Summers	3
(England) Keith Deller	0
(Wales) Peter Locke	3
(England) Rab Fotheringham	1
(Scotland) Jocky Wilson	3
(England) Bob Anderson	1
(England) Graham Collins	3
(England) Ritchie Gardner	1
(England) John Lowe	3
(England) John Walls	1
(Wales) David Jones	3
(Wales) Leighton Rees	0
(England) Dave Whitcombe	3
(England) Lionel Smith	2
(England) Dave Lee	3
(England) Ron Mold	0
(England) Mike Gregory	3
(England) Alan Glazier	1
(England) Bobby George	3
(England) Gary Wilson	0
(Australia) Terry O'Dea	3
(England) Vic Hubbard	1
(Wales) Alan Evans	3
(England) Peter Stockley	1
(Northern Ireland) Steve Brennan	3
(England) Dennis Harbour	1
(England) Eric Bristow	3
(England) George Ewart	2

Second round (best of 7 sets)
(England) Cliff Lazarenko	4
(England) Terry Collins	1
(England) Ken Summers	4
(Wales) Peter Locke	3
(Scotland) Jocky Wilson	4
(England) Graham Collins	2
(England) John Lowe	4
(Wales) David Jones	1
(England) Dave Whitcombe	4
(England) Dave Lee	2
(England) Mike Gregory	4
(England) Bobby George	0
(Australia) Terry O'Dea	2
(Wales) Alan Evans	4
(Northern Ireland) Steve Brennan	0
(England) Eric Bristow	4

Quarter-finals (best of 9 sets)
(England) Cliff Lazarenko	2
(England) Ken Summers	5
(Scotland) Jocky Wilson	2
(England) John Lowe	5
(England) Dave Whitcombe	5
(England) Mike Gregory	3
(Wales) Alan Evans	2
(England) Eric Bristow	5

Semi-finals (best of 11 sets)
(England) Ken Summers	1
(England) John Lowe	6
(England) Dave Whitcombe	3
(England) Eric Bristow	6

Final (best of 13 sets)
(England) John Lowe	4
(England) Eric Bristow	7
