= 1981 British Professional Championship =

Darts tournament

British Professional Championship

Tournament information
- Venue: Fiesta Club
- Location: Stockton-on-Tees
- Country: England
- Organisation(s): BDO
- Format: Sets
- Prize fund: £12,000
- Month(s) Played: September

The 1981 British Professional Championship was a major darts tournament on the BDO/WDF calendar for 1981. It took place in late September at the Fiesta Club, Stockton-on-Tees. It was broadcast on BBC Television.

The tournament featured 32 of the best players from around the world.

== Prize money ==
Total Prize fund was £12,000

- Champion £6,000
- Runner-up £3,000

== Results ==
First round (best of 5 sets)
(Wales) Tony Clark	3
(Scotland) Rab Fotheringham	0
(England) John Lowe	3
(England) Doug McCarthy	2
(England) Les Capewell	3
(Scotland) Rab Smith	1
(Wales) Leighton Rees	3
(England) Bill Lennard	2
(England) Dave Whitcombe	3
(England) Roger Dight	0
(England) Gerry Haywood	3
(Wales) Ceri Morgan	1
(England) Rab Scott	3
(England) Ronnie McElroth	1
(England) Tony Brown	3
(England) Barry Done	1
(England) Alan Glazier	3
(Wales) Wayne Lock	1
(Scotland) Jocky Wilson	3
(Scotland) Angus Ross	1
(England) Eric Parkinson	3
(England) Peter Masson	2
(England) Bobby George	3
(Northern Ireland) Billy Mateer	1
(Wales) Byron Wozencraft	3
(England) Cliff Inglis	1
(England) Cliff Lazarenko	3
(England) Lionel Smith	1
(Wales) Alan Evans	3
(Scotland) Alistair Forrester	0
(England) Eric Bristow	3
(Wales) Tony Ridler	0

Second round (best of 5 sets)
(Wales) Tony Clark	0
(England) John Lowe	3
(England) Les Capewell	2
(Wales) Leighton Rees	3
(England) Dave Whitcombe	3
(England) Gerry Haywood	1
(England) Rab Scott	3
(England) Tony Brown	0
(England) Alan Glazier	0
(Scotland) Jocky Wilson	3
(England) Eric Parkinson	3
(England) Bobby George	0
(Wales) Byron Wozencraft	3
(England) Cliff Lazarenko	1
(Wales) Alan Evans	3
(England) Eric Bristow	2

Quarter-finals (best of 7 sets)
(England) John Lowe	4
(Wales) Leighton Rees	2
(England) Dave Whitcombe	4
(England) Rab Scott	1
(Scotland) Jocky Wilson	4
(England) Eric Parkinson	2
(Wales) Byron Wozencraft	2
(Wales) Alan Evans	4

Semi-finals (best of 9 sets)
(England) John Lowe	5
(England) Dave Whitcombe	2
(Scotland) Jocky Wilson	5
(Wales) Alan Evans	2

Final (best of 11 sets)
(England) John Lowe	5
(Scotland) Jocky Wilson	6
