= 1983 British Professional Championship =

Darts tournament

British Professional Championship

Tournament information
- Venue: Coatham Bowl
- Location: Redcar
- Country: England
- Organisation(s): BDO
- Format: Sets
- Month(s) Played: September

The 1983 British Professional Championship was a major darts tournament on the BDO/WDF calendar for 1983. It took place in late September at the Coatham Bowl, Redcar. It was broadcast on BBC Television.

The tournament featured 32 of the best players from around the world.

== Prize money ==
Total Prize fund was £30,100

- Champion £8,000
- Runner-up

== Results ==
First round (best of 5 sets)
(England) Dave Whitcombe	3
(England) Richard Scott	0
(England) Ritchie Gardner	3
(England) Kelvin Clarke	0
(England) Bobby George	3
(England) John Cosnett	2
(Wales) Leighton Rees	3
(Scotland) Harry Patterson	0
(Scotland) Danny Inglis	3
(England) Tony Brown	1
(Wales) Tony Skuse	3
(England) Martin Wortley	1
(England) John Lowe	3
(England) Jimmy Treanor	1
(England) Paul Reynolds	3
(England) Ronnie Davis	0
(Scotland) Jocky Wilson	3
(England) Brian Nesbit	1
(England) Bob Anderson	3
(Scotland) Les Muirhead	0
(England) Cliff Lazarenko	3
(England) Gary Tozer	1
(Wales) Ceri Morgan	3
(Northern Ireland) Steve Brennan	2
(England) Gerry Haywood	3
(England) Keith Deller	0
(Wales) Dai Furnish	3
(Jersey) Joe Dodd	0
(Wales) Paul James	3
(Wales) Tony Ridler	1
(England) Eric Bristow	3
(England) Alan Glazier	0

Second round (best of 7 sets)
(England) Dave Whitcombe	4
(England) Ritchie Gardner	2
(England) Bobby George	4
(Wales) Leighton Rees	3
(Scotland) Danny Inglis	4
(Wales) Tony Skuse	1
(England) John Lowe	4
(England) Paul Reynolds	0
(Scotland) Jocky Wilson	4
(England) Bob Anderson	0
(England) Cliff Lazarenko	4
(Wales) Ceri Morgan	1
(England) Gerry Haywood	4
(Wales) Dai Furnish	0
(Wales) Paul James	0
(England) Eric Bristow	4

Quarter-finals (best of 9 sets)
(England) Dave Whitcombe	5
(England) Bobby George	2
(Scotland) Danny Inglis	2
(England) John Lowe	5
(Scotland) Jocky Wilson	5
(England) Cliff Lazarenko	1
(England) Gerry Haywood	2
(England) Eric Bristow	5

Semi-finals (best of 11 sets)
(England) Dave Whitcombe	6
(England) John Lowe	3
(Scotland) Jocky Wilson	6
(England) Eric Bristow	5

Final (best of 13 sets)
(England) Dave Whitcombe	2
(Scotland) Jocky Wilson	7
