= 1988 British Professional Championship =

Darts tournament

British Professional Championship

Tournament information
- Venue: Coatham Bowl
- Location: Redcar
- Country: England
- Organisation(s): BDO
- Format: Sets
- Month(s) Played: September

The 1988 British Professional Championship was a major darts tournament on the BDO/WDF calendar for 1988. It took place in mid September at the Coatham Bowl, Redcar. It was broadcast on BBC Television. BBC axed coverage of the event after the event took place and this was last time the event was held.

The tournament featured 32 of the best players from around the world.

== Prize money ==
Total Prize fund was £39,700

- Champion £11,000
- Runner-up £5,500

== Results ==
First round (best of 5 sets)
(England) Keith Deller	3
(England) Cliff Lazarenko	2
(England) John Goves	3
(England) John Lowe	0
(England) Dave Whitcombe	3
(England) Phil Taylor	1
(England) Ritchie Gardner	3
(Scotland) Bob Taylor	0
(Wales) Leighton Rees	3
(England) Steve Gittins	1
(England) Wes Topley	3
(England) Eric Bristow	0
(Scotland) Jocky Wilson	3
(Scotland) Alan Brown	2
(Wales) Eric Burden	3
(England) Martin Adams	1
(England) Mike Gregory	3
(England) Alan Warriner-Little	1
(England) Richard Smith	3
(England) Dennis Hickling	1
(England) Ray Battye	3
(England) Peter Evison	2
(Wales) Martin Phillips	3
(England) Denis Ovens	0
(Scotland) Ronnie Sharp	3
(England) George Ewart	1
(England) Chris Whiting	3
(England) Paul Reynolds	0
(Wales) Chris Johns	3
(England) Reg Harding	0
(England) Bob Anderson	3
(England) Dave Lee	2

Second round (best of 7 sets)
(England) Keith Deller	4
(England) John Goves	2
(England) Dave Whitcombe	4
(England) Ritchie Gardner	2
(Wales) Leighton Rees	4
(England) Wes Topley	2
(Scotland) Jocky Wilson	4
(Wales) Eric Burden	3
(England) Mike Gregory	2
(England) Richard Smith	4
(England) Ray Battye	4
(Wales) Martin Phillips	1
(Scotland) Ronnie Sharp	4
(England) Chris Whiting	0
(Wales) Chris Johns	2
(England) Bob Anderson	4

Quarter-finals (best of 9 sets)
(England) Keith Deller	4
(England) Dave Whitcombe	5
(Wales) Leighton Rees	0
(Scotland) Jocky Wilson	5
(England) Richard Smith	1
(England) Ray Battye	5
(Scotland) Ronnie Sharp	3
(England) Bob Anderson	5

Semi-finals (best of 11 sets)
(England) Dave Whitcombe	4
(Scotland) Jocky Wilson	6
(England) Ray Battye	6
(England) Bob Anderson	3

Final (best of 13 sets)
(Scotland) Jocky Wilson	7
(England) Ray Battye	2
