= Timeline of darts on UK television =

This is a timeline of the history of darts on television in the United Kingdom.

== 1970s ==
- 1972
  - Ten years after darts first appeared on British television when Westward Television broadcast the Westward TV Invitational to the south-west of England, ITV shows darts on a national basis for the first time when it broadcasts coverage of that year's News of the World Darts Championship as part of its World of Sport programme. ITV shows the event each year until 1985 and again in 1987 and 1988.
- 1973
  - 5 April – The Indoor League is shown nationally on ITV for the first time. The programme, which focuses on various games played indoors, includes a darts tournament for both men and women and the programme is later recognised as the 'birthplace of television darts'.
- 1974
  - 31 August – ITV shows the first edition of the World Masters. It continues to show the event until it drops darts in 1988.
  - The BBC shows darts for the first time when it covers that year's British Open.
- 1975
  - No events.
- 1976
  - Anglia Television show the first British Matchplay championships. They continue to show the event until 1989 and again in 1991.
- 1977
  - ATV broadcasts the first edition of the Butlins Grand Masters on ITV. ATV/Central continues to show the event until 1986. ITV shows coverage of the first World Cup from London (this event is held every two years in various countries).
- 1978
  - 6–10 February – The BBC broadcasts highlights of the inaugural BDO World Darts Championship.
  - 7 April – The Indoor League is shown for the final time, ending after six series.
  - The BBC shows the first edition of the BDO Gold Cup and covers the event until 1982.
- 1979
  - ITV shows coverage of the World Cup from Las Vegas.

== 1980s ==
- 1980
  - No events.
- 1981
  - The BBC further expands its coverage of darts when it shows the first edition of the British Professional Championship. It shows the event until it decides to cut back its coverage of darts in 1988. ITV shows coverage of the World Cup from Nelson.
- 1982
  - The BBC shows the BDO Gold Cup for the final time.
- 1983
  - ITV shows coverage of the World Cup from Edinburgh. BBC shows British Open for the final time. ITV shows the Blackthorn Masters for the first time. It covers the event until ITV ceases all national darts broadcasts in 1988. BBC shows Isle of Man Darts Challenge (the only time the event is known to have been televised).
- 1984
  - ITV shows the first MFI World Matchplay championships, in which John Lowe hits the first televised nine-dart finish. ITV shows the event until dropping its darts coverage in 1988. ITV shows British Open (taking over from BBC) and covers the event until 1988.
- 1985
  - ITV shows coverage of the World Cup from Brisbane.
- 1986
  - The Butlins Grand Masters tournament ends.
- 1987
  - ITV shows coverage of the World Cup from Copenhagen.
- 1988
  - Summer – The BBC announces that it will end all coverage of darts apart from the World Championships. The British Professional Championship is no longer held after 1988.
  - October – ITV announces that it will stop showing darts. The MFI World Matchplay is no longer held after 1988. The Blackthorn Masters ends the next year. The News of the World is held again, untelevised, in 1989 and 1990 before being revived on Sky Sports for one edition in 1997. The World Masters and British Open are televised in later years.
- 1989
  - 6–14 January – Following both the BBC and ITV deciding to stop showing darts, the only darts shown extensively on national television in 1989 is the 1989 BDO World Darts Championship. Anglia Television continues to show the British Matchplay in the East of England region. ITV shows brief highlights of the World Cup from Toronto.

== 1990s ==
- 1990
  - Even though only one tournament is broadcast on terrestrial television, some darts coverage, including the World Masters and the British Matchplay, is broadcast on British Satellite Broadcasting’s Sports Channel.
- 1991
  - Sky Sports broadcasts the World Masters, and does so again in 1992. The British Matchplay is shown for the final time on Anglia Television. The following year most of the top players did not play in the event, preferring to play in the WDC UK Masters instead.
- 1992
  - Sky signs a deal with the newly formed World Darts Council (WDC), later renamed the Professional Darts Corporation (PDC), to broadcast three of its tournaments.
  - October – Anglia Television broadcasts the WDC UK Masters, thereby giving the WDC its first television exposure.
- 1993
  - Following the Split in darts, Sky stops covering BDO tournaments.
  - Cable channel Wire TV broadcasts the World Masters. It also shows the 1994 event.
  - 26 December – Sky Sports covers the first PDC World Darts Championship and has broadcast the event ever since.
- 1994
  - Wire TV broadcasts the 1994 BDO Gold Cup. It also shows the 1995 event.
  - 1–8 August – Sky Sports broadcasts the first World Matchplay. Sky continues to show this event to this day.
- 1995
  - L!VE TV shows coverage of that year's World Masters. ITV shows brief highlights in its night-time programme Sport AM.
- 1996
  - Eurosport takes over as broadcaster of the World Masters.
- 1997
  - Sky Sports and the News of the World resurrect the News of the World Darts Championship. The overall response to the competition was seen as being disappointing and the News of the World decided against running it again.
- 1998
  - 14–18 October – Sky Sports shows the first edition of the World Grand Prix. It continues to show this event to this day.
- 1999
  - ITV broadcasts a one-off event between the 1999 BDO v PDC showdown between Phil Taylor and Raymond van Barneveld.

== 2000s ==
- 2000
  - No events.
- 2001
  - The BBC replaces Eurosport as broadcaster of the World Masters. This is the first time in many years that the BBC has broadcast a darts event other than the BDO World Darts Championship. The BBC shows the event until 2010.
- 2002
  - 4–7 July – Sky Sports shows the first edition of a new overseas tournament, the Las Vegas Desert Classic. Sky continues to show the event until it ends in 2009.
- 2003
  - 30 May-3 June – Sky Sports shows the first edition of the UK Open and continues to show the event until 2013.
- 2004
  - 21 November – Sky Sports broadcasts a pay-per-view challenge match between Phil Taylor, the reigning PDC world champion, and incumbent BDO World Champion Andy Fordham.
- 2005
  - 1 January – The start of the 2005 BDO World Darts Championship sees the BBC provide live coverage of every dart live for the first time, showing this additional coverage on its BBC Red Button service.
  - 20 January – Sky Sports shows the first night of a new tournament Premier League Darts. The League is a new format and is played over a number of one-off nights, generally every Thursday. Sky continues to show the event to this day.
- 2006
  - No events.
- 2007
  - 17–25 November – Having not broadcast live darts since, ITV resumes live coverage of the sport when it shows the inaugural Grand Slam of Darts. The afternoon sessions on the weekends including the final session was broadcast by ITV1 with the evening sessions on ITV4. Late night highlights were broadcast on ITV1.
- 2008
  - Setanta Sports broadcasts the 2008 BDO Gold Cup.
  - 30 October-2 November – Following the successful broadcasting of the Grand Slam of Darts, ITV1 and ITV4 starts showing a new tournament, the European Championship with all the live action on ITV4 with highlights on ITV1
- 2009
  - ITV broadcasts the Players Championship Finals. This was the last tournament that ITV1 shows darts coverage as all coverage of the sport transfers to ITV4.

== 2010s ==
- 2010
  - 29 July-1 August – Bravo shows darts for the first and only time when it broadcasts the 2010 European Championship.
- 2011
  - 6 July – ESPN announces a deal with the British Darts Organisation which sees it become exclusive broadcaster of the World Masters along with other BDO tournaments. The deal also includes shared coverage with the BBC of the BDO World Darts Championship.
  - September – Having lost the contract to show the Grand Slam of Darts to Sky Sports, ITV4 picks up the rights to the European Darts Championship and the Second Players Championship Finals of 2011.
- 2012
  - 7 January – ESPN breaks the BBC’s monopoly on covering the BDO World Darts Championship. This begins a pattern which continues with BT Sport from 2014 whereby two broadcasters share the rights with ESPN (and from 2015 BT Sport) showing the weeknight evening coverage exclusively live with all other coverage shared between both broadcasters.
  - 20–23 September – ESPN shows the 2012 Darts European Championship, thereby becoming the first broadcaster in Britain to show both BDO and PDC tournaments at the same time.
- 2013
  - 14 June – The PDC and ITV announce a new deal to cover four tournaments a year from 2013 to 2015. The tournaments are The Players Championship, The European Championship which they covered previously in 2008 and 2011, a new tournament called the Masters and the UK Open. A fifth tournament is added to ITV's contract the following year, for the World Series of Darts Finals.
  - July - For the first time. ITV4 did not broadcast the whole of the 2013 Darts European Championship and had delayed starts to the evening sessions due to its coverage of the 2013 Tour de France.
  - December – Sky Sports Darts appears for the first time to broadcast 24/7 coverage of the PDC World Darts Championship.
- 2014
  - 4–9 February – Eurosport shows the first edition of the BDO World Trophy. It also shows the 2015 event.
  - 7–9 March – ITV takes over as broadcaster of the UK Open.
  - November – ITV signs a deal to cover five darts tournaments in 2015, including a new tournament entitled the World Series of Darts Finals. This means that in 2015 ITV will cover the Masters in January, the UK Open in March, the European Championship in October, the World Series of Darts Finals and Players Championship Finals in November.
  - 18 December – For the first time, Sky Sports broadcasts a full time temporary channel, Sky Sports Darts, for the duration of the PDC World Darts Championship. The channel mixes live coverage with replays of the most recent sessions and classic moments from the tournament's history. Sky Sports Darts has returned in all subsequent years.
- 2015
  - January – BT Sport becomes the secondary rights holder to the BDO World Darts Championship.
  - May - ITV4 broadcast the World Series of Darts for the first time broadcasting either Live or delayed coverage.
- 2016
  - 2–10 January – The BBC shows the BDO World Darts Championship for the final time.
  - February – It is announced that the BBC will cover the inaugural PDC Champions League of Darts. As a consequence the BBC would no longer show the BDO World Darts Championships, a tournament that the BBC had shown since its inception in 1978. This is the first time that the BBC has covered a PDC event.
  - 28–30 May – UKTV channel Dave makes a one-off return to darts when it shows the 2016 BDO World Trophy.
  - 1–4 December – Premier Sports broadcasts the 2016 World Masters. It does so just once as the tournament returns to Eurosport the following year.
- 2017
  - 7 January – Channel 4 broadcasts darts for the first time when it shows live coverage of the 2017 BDO World Darts Championship. Channel 4 also shows the 2018 event.
  - 26–29 May – The 2017 BDO World Trophy is broadcast by short-lived sports channel Front Runner. The channel also shows the England Open the following month.
- 2018
  - 30 May-3 June – Premier Sports broadcasts full coverage of the 2018 BDO World Trophy.
- 2019
  - January – Eurosport becomes the new broadcaster of the BDO World Darts Championship. It shows some of the games on sister free-to-air channel QUEST. Eurosport also shows that year’s World Masters and BDO World Trophy.

== 2020s ==
- 2020
  - 4-12 January – Eurosport shows the final BDO World Darts Championship. Eurosport would have shown the 2021 edition but the BDO went into liquidation in September 2020.
  - September - ITV4 broadcast the 2020 World Series of Darts Finals on a one-hour delayed basis due to a clash with 2020 Tour de France.
- 2021
  - No events
- 2022
  - 3–6 February – The BBC and BT Sport broadcast full live coverage of the first World Seniors Darts Championship.
  - 2–10 April – Eurosport is the broadcaster of the World Darts Federation's first World Championship.
  - September - Since ITV4 has begun showing EFL Highlights, the Saturday evening sessions of darts events are shown on ITV3 with the rest of the tournament on ITV4. The same applies to Snooker coverage.
- 2023
  - February – Viaplay Sports becomes the rights holder of the PDC European Tour of 13 live events for the next five seasons.
