= 1985 BDO World Darts Championship =

Tournament information
- Dates: 5–12 January 1985
- Venue: Jollees Cabaret Club
- Location: Stoke-on-Trent
- Country: England
- Organisation(s): BDO
- Format: Sets; Final – best of 11
- Prize fund: £43,000
- Winner's share: £10,000
- High checkout: 170 (England) John Lowe

Champion(s)
- (England) Eric Bristow

The 1985 BDO World Darts Championship (known for sponsorship reasons as The 1985 Embassy World Darts Championship) was the 8th World Professional Championships. The tournament was held between 5 and 12 January. It was the seventh and final time that the tournament was held at the Jollees Cabaret Club in Stoke-on-Trent, as the tournament organisers, the British Darts Organisation, decided to move the event to the Lakeside Country Club in Frimley Green, Surrey, from 1986.

Eric Bristow went into the tournament as defending champion and was almost beaten in the first round by Ken Summers. Summers had won the first set and was two legs to nil in front and left on 68 to pull off a major surprise. After hitting single 20 and single 16, he threw a potential match-winning dart at double sixteen just inside the wire of the single. Bristow then came back to win the match. Bristow went on to win his fourth World Title, extending his own record for victories. John Lowe suffered defeat in the final for the fourth time, failing to add to his only previous title – won in 1979.

Keith Deller, champion two years previously, set a new record for becoming the first player to average over 100 with his three darts during a match at the World Championship. His average of 100.30 was not enough to win his quarter-final against John Lowe, who averaged 97.83. Bristow almost matched this record in his semi-final victory over Dave Whitcombe. Bristow fell just short of a hundred, with an average of 99.66. In the final against Lowe, Bristow exactly equalled the then record for the highest average in a World Championship final, of 97.50, from the previous year's final of Bristow vs. Whitcombe.

== Prize money ==
Total Prize fund was £43,000 (plus a £51,000 bonus for a nine-dart finish – not won)

- Champion £10,000
- Runner-up £5,000
- Semi-finalists £2,500
- Quarter-finalists £1,500
- 2nd round losers £1,000
- 1st round losers £500
- Highest checkout £1,000

== Seeds ==
1. (England) Eric Bristow
2. (England) John Lowe
3. (England) Mike Gregory
4. (Scotland) Jocky Wilson
5. (England) Dave Whitcombe
6. (England) Cliff Lazarenko
7. (England) Dave Lee
8. (Northern Ireland) Steve Brennan

== Results ==
First Round (best of 3 sets)
1	(England) Eric Bristow (86.46)	2
(England) Ken Summers (81.75)	1
(Belgium) Willy Logie (81.27)	2
(Canada) Bob Sinnaeve (82.29)	1
8	(Northern Ireland) Steve Brennan (83.64)	2
(Wales) Ceri Morgan (81.06)	1
(England) Alan Glazier (84.51)	2
(United States) Jerry Umberger (82.41)	0
5	(England) Dave Whitcombe (87.81)	2
(Canada) Alex MacKinnon (69.63)	0
(England) Bob Anderson (88.65)	2
(Finland) Arto Lintunen (85.95)	1
4	(Scotland) Jocky Wilson (76.56)	2
(Scotland) Peter Masson (75.42)	0
(Australia) Russell Stewart (82.53)	2
(Wales) Leighton Rees (78.45)	1
2	(England) John Lowe (85.86)	2
(Australia) Terry O'Dea (81.36)	1
(England) John Cosnett (77.28)	2
(England) Rab Scott (75.63)	0
7	(England) Dave Lee (85.35)	1
(Belgium) Luc Marreel (83.94)	2
(England) Keith Deller (79.32)	2
(United States) Nicky Virachkul (73.80)	0
6	(England) Cliff Lazarenko (89.22)	2
(Singapore) Paul Lim (83.16)	0
(Sweden) Stefan Lord (81.90)	2
(Finland) Tapani Uitos (77.28)	1
3	(England) Mike Gregory (86.79)	0
(England) Bobby George (87.21)	2
(Northern Ireland) Fred McMullan (80.55)	2
(Wales) Peter Locke (81.03)	0

Second Round (best of 5 sets)
1	(England) Eric Bristow (90.54)	3
(Belgium) Willy Logie (84.57)	0
8	(Northern Ireland) Steve Brennan (86.13)	2
(England) Alan Glazier (94.68)	3
5	(England) Dave Whitcombe (97.14)	3
(England) Bob Anderson (91.86)	1
4	(Scotland) Jocky Wilson (88.86)	3
(Australia) Russell Stewart (83.82)	1
2	(England) John Lowe (84.54)	3
(England) John Cosnett (72.75)	0
(Belgium) Luc Marreel (81.48)	0
(England) Keith Deller (91.29)	3
6	(England) Cliff Lazarenko (96.90)	3
(Sweden) Stefan Lord (90.21)	0
(England) Bobby George (89.01)	1
(Northern Ireland) Fred McMullan (93.06)	3

Quarter-Finals (best of 7 sets)
1	(England) Eric Bristow (91.71)	4
(England) Alan Glazier (80.70)	0
5	(England) Dave Whitcombe (94.92)	4
4	(Scotland) Jocky Wilson (95.52)	3
2	(England) John Lowe (98.09)	4
(England) Keith Deller (100.30)	2
6	(England) Cliff Lazarenko (78.27)	4
(Northern Ireland) Fred McMullan (73.98)	0

Semi-Finals (best of 9 sets)
1	(England) Eric Bristow (99.66)	5
5	(England) Dave Whitcombe (97.02)	2
2	(England) John Lowe (95.55)	5
6	(England) Cliff Lazarenko (92.67)	3

Final (best of 11 sets)
1	(England) Eric Bristow (97.50)	6
2	(England) John Lowe (93.12)	2
