= BDO Gold Cup =

Tournament information
- Venue: Magna Centre
- Location: Rotherham (2018)
- Country: (United Kingdom) Great Britain
- Established: 1978
- Organisation(s): BDO, category A /WDF category 1
- Format: 32 players (men's and women's)
- Prize fund: £14,200
- Month(s) Played: June
- Final Year: 2019

Current champion(s)
- (Wales) Jim Williams (Men's) (England) Beau Greaves (Women's)

The BDO Gold Cup began in 1978 and was held in Stoke. It was broadcast on the BBC until 1982, with the 1983 tournament blacked out due to a technicians' strike. ITV took over from 1984-1988, and BSB/BSkyB's The Sports Channel/Sky Sports covered the event from 1990-92. It was then broadcast in 2008 on Setanta Sports in the UK, after a brief stint on the short-lived channel Wire TV (1994-95). At the end of its existence, the event was staged at the Magna Centre, Rotherham, England.

== List of winners ==
=== Men's ===
Year	Champion	Score	Runner-up	Total Prize Money
1978	(England) John Lowe	?-?	(England) Colin Baker	?
1979	(England) John Lowe	?-?	(Wales) Tony Ridler	?
1980	(England) Eric Bristow	?-?	(England) John Lowe	?
1981	(Wales) Tony Skuse	?-?	(Wales) John Corfe	?
1982	(England) John Lowe	2–0	(England) Ritchie Gardner	?
1983	(England) Bob Anderson	beat	(England) Paul Reynolds	?
1984	(England) Cliff Lazarenko	?-?	(England) Dave Whitcombe	?
1985	(England) Dave Lee	?-?	(England) Peter Evison	?
1986	(England) Bob Anderson	beat	(Scotland) Robert MacKenzie	?
1987	(Wales) David Harrold	?-?	(England) Alan Warriner	?
1988	(England) Chris Whiting	2-0	(England) Mike Gregory	?
1989	(Wales) Chris Johns	2-0	(England) Robbie Widdows	?
1990	(England) Rod Harrington	2–1	(England) Bob Anderson	?
1991	(England) Dennis Priestley	2–0	(England) Steve Beaton	?
1992	(England) Dennis Priestley	2–0	(England) Scott Coleman	?
1993	(England) Shayne Burgess	2–0	(Scotland) Stewart Rattray	?
1994	(England) Mike Gregory	3–2	(England) Fran Lynch	?
1995	(England) Mervyn King	2–0	(Wales) Richie Burnett	?
1996	(England) Paul Whitworth	2–0	(Jamaica) Al Hedman	?
1997	(Wales) Sean Palfrey	2–1	(England) Mervyn King	?
1998	(Scotland) Peter Johnstone	beat	(England) Peter Manley	?
1999	(England) Ted Hankey	2–1	(England) Martin Adams	?
2000	(England) Lee Savage	2–1	(Wales) Martyn Freeman	?
2001	(Wales) Richie Burnett	beat	(England) Andy Jenkins	?
2002	(England) Tony Eccles	2–0	(England) Alan Warriner	?
2003	(England) Brian Derbyshire	2–0	(Wales) Richie Burnett	?
2004	(Wales) Ritchie Davies	2–1	(England) Steve Farmer	?
2005	(Wales) Derek Williams	2–1	(England) Kirk Shepherd	?
2006	(Scotland) Gary Anderson	2–0	(Wales) Robert Hughes	?
2007	(England) Dave Chisnall	2–0	(Wales) Matthew Quinlan	?
2008	(England) Scott Waites	4–2	(Scotland) Gary Anderson	?
2009	(England) Paul Brookes	4–2	(England) Brian Woods	?
2010	(England) Andy Breadmore	4–1	(England) Gary Butcher	?
2011	(Scotland) Ross Montgomery	3–2	(England) Paul Carter	?
2012	(England) Stephen Bunting	3–1	(Wales) Wayne Warren	?
2013	(England) Paul Hogan	3–2	(England) James Wilson	?
2014	(Wales) Wayne Warren	3–0	(England) Pip Blackwell	?
2015	(England) Brian Dawson	3–0	(England) Paul Barham	?
2016	(England) Glen Durrant	6–3	(England) Paul Hogan	?
2017	(England) Ryan Joyce	6–3	(Wales) Wayne Warren	?
2018	(England) Scott Mitchell	6–4	(Scotland) Gary Stone	£14,200
2019	(Wales) Jim Williams	6–3	(England) Daniel Ayres	?

=== Women's ===
Year	Champion	Score	Runner-up	Total Prize Money
2018	(England) Lisa Ashton	5–3	(England) Maria O'Brien	£14,200
2019	(England) Beau Greaves	5–0	(England) Fallon Sherrock	£14,200
