= British Matchplay =

Tournament information
- Venue: Seashore Holiday Camp, Great Yarmouth
- Country: England
- Established: 1976
- Organisation(s): BDO Major (23 editions)
- Format: Sets
- Final Year: 1998

Final champion(s)
- (England) Ronnie Baxter

The British Matchplay championship was a major darts tournament organised by the British Darts Organisation.

The tournament lasted for twenty three years and contained eight-man draws. The tournament was usually televised by Anglia Television, who owned the ITV franchise for the East of England.

== Finals ==
The complete list of final results:

Year	Champion	Score	Runner-up	Prize money	Sponsor	TV coverage
1976	(England) Bill Lennard	4–3	(England) Alan Glazier		Ladbrokes	ITV (World of Sport & Anglia Television)
1977	(Scotland) Rab Smith	3–2	(England) Eric Bristow	£1,500 to winner	Ladbrokes	ITV (Anglia Television)
1978	(England) John Lowe	2–1	(England) Tony Brown	£1,500 to winner	Ladbrokes	ITV (Anglia Television)
1979	(England) Cliff Lazarenko	2–0	(England) Tony Brown	£2,000 to winner	Ladbrokes	ITV (Anglia Television)
1980	(Scotland) Jocky Wilson	2–0	(Wales) Leighton Rees	£2,000 to winner	Ladbrokes	ITV (Anglia Television)
1981	(Scotland) Jocky Wilson	2–0	(England) Cliff Lazarenko		Holsten	ITV (Anglia Television)
1982	(England) Eric Bristow	2–0	(England) Dave Whitcombe	£2,400 to winner	Fosters	ITV (Anglia Television)
1983	(England) Eric Bristow	3–2	(England) Keith Deller		Fosters	ITV (Anglia Television)
1984	(England) Mike Gregory	3–2	(England) Keith Deller	£3,000 to winner	Yorkshire Bitter	ITV (Anglia Television)
1985	(England) John Lowe	3–0	(England) Cliff Lazarenko		Norwich Bitter	ITV (Anglia Television)
1986	(England) Eric Bristow	3–1	(England) Dave Whitcombe		Fosters	ITV (Anglia Television)
1987	(England) Dave Whitcombe	3–0	(England) Eric Bristow			ITV (Anglia Television)
1988	(England) Bob Anderson	3–2	(England) John Lowe		Poacher Bitter	ITV (Anglia Television)
1989	(England) Bob Anderson	3–0	(England) Cliff Lazarenko			ITV (Anglia Television)
1990	(England) Alan Warriner-Little	5–4	(England) Bob Anderson	£3,500 to winner		BSB
1991	(England) Dennis Priestley	5–2	(England) Phil Taylor			ITV (Anglia Television)
1992	(England) Ronnie Baxter	5–4	(Wales) Martin Phillips			
1993	(England) Steve Beaton	5–2	(England) Ronnie Baxter			
1994	(Wales) Richie Burnett	5–4	(England) Ronnie Baxter			
1995	(England) Andy Fordham	5–4	(England) Dave Askew			
1996	(England) Martin Adams	3–2	(England) Steve Beaton			
1997	(England) Kevin Painter	3–0	(England) Steve Beaton			
1998	(England) Ronnie Baxter	3–1	(Wales) Richie Davies			

== Draws ==
=== 1976 ===
Quarterfinals
(Wales) Leighton Rees	4
(England) George Simmons	2
(England) Alan Glazier	4
(Scotland) Willie Scott	2
(Wales) Alan Evans	4
(England) Charlie Ellix	0
(England) Bill Lennard	4
(England) John Lowe	3

Semifinals
(Wales) Leighton Rees	3
(England) Alan Glazier	4
(Wales) Alan Evans	3
(England) Bill Lennard	4

Final
(England) Alan Glazier	3
(England) Bill Lennard	4

=== 1977 ===
Quarterfinals
(England) Bill Lennard
(England) John Lowe
(Scotland) Rab Smith
(England) Alan Glazier
(England) Eric Bristow
(Wales) Alan Evans
(Wales) Leighton Rees
(England) Cliff Lazarenko

Semifinals
(England) Bill Lennard
(Scotland) Rab Smith
(England) Eric Bristow
(Wales) Leighton Rees

Final
(Scotland) Rab Smith	3
(England) Eric Bristow	2

=== 1978 ===
Quarterfinals
(Wales) Alan Evans	2
(Scotland) Rab Smith	0
(England) Tony Brown	2
(Wales) Leighton Rees	1
(England) Eric Bristow	2
(Sweden) Stefan Lord	1
(England) John Lowe	2
(England) Cliff Lazarenko	0

Semifinals
(Wales) Alan Evans	0
(England) Tony Brown	2
(England) Eric Bristow	1
(England) John Lowe	2

Final
(England) Tony Brown	1
(England) John Lowe	2

=== 1979 ===
Quarterfinals
(England) Tony Brown	2
(England) Doug McCarthy	0
(England) Bobby George	2
(England) Eric Bristow	1
(England) Cliff Lazarenko	2
(England) John Lowe	0
(Scotland) Jocky Wilson	2
(Wales) Leighton Rees	0

Semifinals
(England) Tony Brown	2
(England) Bobby George	1
(England) Cliff Lazarenko	2
(Scotland) Jocky Wilson	0

Final
(England) Tony Brown	0
(England) Cliff Lazarenko	2

=== 1980 ===
Quarterfinals
(Scotland) Jocky Wilson
(England) Cliff Lazarenko
(England) John Lowe
(England) Eric Bristow
(England) Tony Brown
(Wales) Ceri Morgan
(England) Bobby George
(Wales) Leighton Rees

Semifinals
(Scotland) Jocky Wilson
(England) Eric Bristow
(England) Tony Brown
(Wales) Leighton Rees

Final
(Scotland) Jocky Wilson	2
(Wales) Leighton Rees	0

=== 1981 ===
Quarterfinals
(England) Eric Bristow	2
(England) Tony Brown	1
(Scotland) Jocky Wilson	2
(England) John Lowe	0
(England) Bobby George	2
(Wales) Ceri Morgan	0
(England) Cliff Lazarenko	2
(Wales) Leighton Rees	1

Semifinals
(England) Eric Bristow	0
(Scotland) Jocky Wilson	2'
(England) Bobby George	1
(England) Cliff Lazarenko	2

Final
(Scotland) Jocky Wilson	2
(England) Cliff Lazarenko	0

=== 1982 ===
Quarterfinals
(England) John Lowe	2
(England) Bobby George	0
(England) Eric Bristow	2
(Scotland) Jocky Wilson	0
(England) Dave Whitcombe	2
(Wales) Tony Skuse	0
(England) Cliff Lazarenko	2
(Northern Ireland) Steve Brennan	0

Semifinals
(England) John Lowe	1
(England) Eric Bristow	2
(England) Dave Whitcombe	2
(England) Cliff Lazarenko	1

Final
(England) Eric Bristow	2
(England) Dave Whitcombe	0

=== 1983 ===
Quarterfinals
(England) John Lowe	3
(Scotland) Jocky Wilson	1
(England) Keith Deller	3
(England) Tony Brown	2
(England) Cliff Lazarenko	3
(England) Bobby George	0
(England) Eric Bristow	3
(England) Dave Whitcombe	1

Semifinals
(England) John Lowe	0
(England) Keith Deller	3
(England) Cliff Lazarenko	1
(England) Eric Bristow	3

Final
(England) Keith Deller	2
(England) Eric Bristow	3

=== 1984 ===
Quarterfinals
(England) Cliff Lazarenko	3
(England) Bob Anderson	2
(England) Keith Deller	3
(England) Dave Whitcombe	2
(England) Eric Bristow	3
(England) John Lowe	0
(England) Mike Gregory	3
(Scotland) Jocky Wilson	1

Semifinals
(England) Cliff Lazarenko	2
(England) Keith Deller	3
(England) Eric Bristow	2
(England) Mike Gregory	3

Final
(England) Keith Deller	2
(England) Mike Gregory	3

=== 1985 ===
Quarterfinals
(England) Cliff Lazarenko	3
(England) Mike Gregory	2
(England) Keith Deller	3
(England) Dave Whitcombe	1
(England) Eric Bristow	3
(Scotland) Jocky Wilson	0
(England) John Lowe	3
(Australia) Terry O'Dea	2

Semifinals
(England) Cliff Lazarenko	3
(England) Keith Deller	2
(England) Eric Bristow	0
(England) John Lowe	3

Final
(England) Cliff Lazarenko	0
(England) John Lowe	3

=== 1986 ===
Quarterfinals
(England) Cliff Lazarenko	3
(England) John Lowe	2
(England) Dave Whitcombe	3
(England) Bob Anderson	2
(Scotland) Jocky Wilson	3
(England) Dave Lee	1
(England) Eric Bristow	3
(Wales) Peter Locke	1

Semifinals
(England) Cliff Lazarenko	0
(England) Dave Whitcombe	3
(Scotland) Jocky Wilson	0
(England) Eric Bristow	3

Final
(England) Dave Whitcombe	1
(England) Eric Bristow	3

=== 1987 ===
Quarterfinals
(England) Cliff Lazarenko	3
(England) John Lowe	0
(England) Dave Whitcombe	3
(England) Bob Anderson	1
(England) Eric Bristow	3
(England) Mike Gregory	2
(England) Keith Deller	3
(Scotland) Jocky Wilson	1

Semifinals
(England) Cliff Lazarenko	1
(England) Dave Whitcombe	3
(England) Eric Bristow	3
(England) Keith Deller	1

Final
(England) Dave Whitcombe	3
(England) Eric Bristow	0

=== 1988 ===
Quarterfinals
(England)
(England) John Lowe	3
(England) Peter Evison	3
(England)
(England) Bob Anderson	3
(Scotland) Jocky Wilson	0
(England) Eric Bristow	3
(Scotland)

Semifinals
(England) John Lowe	3
(England) Peter Evison	2
(England) Bob Anderson	3
(England) Eric Bristow	2

Final
(England) John Lowe	2
(England) Bob Anderson	3

=== 1989 ===
Quarterfinals
(England) Cliff Lazarenko	3
(England) Dave Whitcombe	1
(England) Mike Gregory	3
(England) John Lowe	1
(Scotland) Jocky Wilson	3
(England) Steve Gittins	1
(England) Bob Anderson	3
(England) Eric Bristow	1

Semifinals
(England) Cliff Lazarenko	3
(England) Mike Gregory	1
(Scotland) Jocky Wilson	1
(England) Bob Anderson	3

Final
(England) Cliff Lazarenko	0
(England) Bob Anderson	3

=== 1990 ===
Quarterfinals
(England) Bob Anderson	3
(Wales) Chris Johns	1
(England) Mike Gregory	3
(England) Eric Bristow	1
(England) Alan Warriner-Little	3
(England) Peter Evison	2
(England) Phil Taylor	3
(England) John Lowe	2

Semifinals
(England) Bob Anderson	4
(England) Mike Gregory	3
(England) Alan Warriner-Little	4
(England) Phil Taylor	3

Final
(England) Bob Anderson	4
(England) Alan Warriner-Little	5

=== 1991 ===
Quarterfinals
(England) Dennis Priestley	3
(England) Bob Anderson	2
(England) Alan Warriner-Little	3
(England) John Lowe	2
(Scotland) Jocky Wilson	3
(England) Ronnie Baxter	0
(England) Phil Taylor	3
(England) Eric Bristow	0

Semifinals
(England) Dennis Priestley	4
(England) Alan Warriner-Little	2
(Scotland) Jocky Wilson	0
(England) Phil Taylor	4

Final
(England) Dennis Priestley	5
(England) Phil Taylor	2

=== 1992 ===
Quarterfinals
(England) Graham Miller	4
(England) Shayne Burgess	0
(Wales) Martin Phillips	4
(England) Phil Gilman	3
(England) Steve Beaton	4
(England) Kevin Kenny	2
(England) Ronnie Baxter	4
(Wales) Chris Johns	2

Semifinals
(England) Graham Miller	2
(Wales) Martin Phillips	4
(England) Steve Beaton	3
(England) Ronnie Baxter	4

Final
(Wales) Martin Phillips	4
(England) Ronnie Baxter	5

=== 1993 ===
Quarterfinals
(England) Steve Beaton	4
(England) Kevin Painter	2
(England) Shayne Burgess	4
(Wales) Martin Phillips	0
(England) Ronnie Baxter	4
(England) Kevin Kenny	3
(Scotland) Ronnie Sharp	4
(England) Dave Askew	2

Semifinals
(England) Steve Beaton	4
(England) Shayne Burgess	0
(England) Ronnie Baxter	4
(Scotland) Ronnie Sharp	3

Final
(England) Steve Beaton	5
(England) Ronnie Baxter	2

=== 1994 ===
Quarterfinals
(England) Ronnie Baxter	4
(Scotland) Alan Brown	2
(Scotland) Les Wallace	4
(England) Martin Adams	2
(England) Steve Beaton	4
(Wales) Sean Palfrey	2
(Wales) Richie Burnett	4
(England) Dave Askew	1

Semifinals
(England) Ronnie Baxter	4
(Scotland) Les Wallace	0
(England) Steve Beaton	2
(Wales) Richie Burnett	4

Final
(England) Ronnie Baxter	4
(Wales) Richie Burnett	5

=== 1995 ===
Quarterfinals
(England) Kevin Painter	4
(England) Colin Monk	3
(England) Andy Fordham	4
(Wales) Sean Palfrey	0
(England) Martin Adams	4
(England) Paul Williams	0
(England) Dave Askew	4
(England) Ronnie Baxter	2

Semifinals
(England) Kevin Painter	1
(England) Andy Fordham	4
(England) Martin Adams	3
(England) Dave Askew	4

Final
(England) Andy Fordham	5
(England) Dave Askew	4

=== 1996 ===
Quarterfinals
(Wales) Richie Burnett	3
(England) Ronnie Baxter	2
(England) Steve Beaton	3
(England) Andy Fordham	0
(England) Colin Monk	3
(England) Mike Gregory	0
(England) Martin Adams	3
(Scotland) Les Wallace	2

Semifinals
(Wales) Richie Burnett	2
(England) Steve Beaton	3
(England) Colin Monk	1
(England) Martin Adams	3

Final
(England) Steve Beaton	2
(England) Martin Adams	3

=== 1997 ===
Quarterfinals
(England) Mervyn King	3
(England) Andy Smith	1
(England) Steve Beaton	3
(Wales) Richie Burnett	2
(England) Kevin Painter	3
(England) Martin Adams	2
(England) Colin Monk	3
(Scotland) Les Wallace	0

Semifinals
(Wales) Mervyn King	1
(England) Steve Beaton	3
(England) Kevin Painter	3
(England) Colin Monk	1

Final
(England) Steve Beaton	0
(England) Kevin Painter	3

=== 1998 ===
Quarterfinals
(England) Ronnie Baxter	3
(Scotland) Peter Johnstone	1
(Wales) Sean Palfrey	3
(Netherlands) Roland Scholten	2
(England) Steve Beaton	3
(England) Colin Monk	0
(Wales) Richie Davies	3
(England) Martin Adams	0

Semifinals
(England) Ronnie Baxter	3
(Wales) Sean Palfrey	0
(England) Steve Beaton	1
(Wales) Richie Davies	3

Final
(England) Ronnie Baxter	3
(Wales) Richie Davies	1
