= Spring Cup (disambiguation) =

Spring Cup is a defunct Scottish football tournament.

Spring Cup may also refer to:

- Spring Cup (darts), a darts tournament
- Spring Cup (synchronized skating), a synchronized skating competition
- Spring Cup (horse race), a horse race run at Lingfield Park
- Spring Cup (motor race), a motor race run at Oulton Park
