= Trevor Nurse =

British darts player (1965–2016)

Personal information
- Full name: Trevor Nurse
- Born: 14 February 1965 Scotland
- Died: 25 July 2016 (aged 51) Downham Market

Sport
- Sport: Darts
- Laterality: Right-handed

Organisation (see split in darts)
- BDO: 1988–1994

WDF major events – best performances
- World Championship: Last 32: 1989, 1994
- World Masters: Last 128: 1988
- Updated on 2 February 2019

Trevor Nurse (14 February 1965 – 25 July 2016) was a British professional darts player.

== Darts career ==
Nurse played in the 1989 BDO World Darts Championship, losing in the first round to Sweden's Magnus Caris. He returned to the Lakeside in 1994, but again lost in the first round, this time to fellow Scot Ronnie Sharp, who went on to reach the semi-finals.

== World Championship results ==
=== BDO ===
- 1989: 1st Round (lost to Magnus Caris 1–3)
- 1994: 1st Round (lost to Ronnie Sharp 2–3)

=== WDF major finals: 1 (1 runner-up) ===
Legend
Europe Cup (0–1)

Outcome	No.	Year	Championship	Opponent in the final	Score
Runner-up	1.	1988	Europe Cup Singles	(England) Mike Gregory	0–4 (l)
