= Seafield Colliery =

Coal mine in Fife, Scotland

Coordinates: 56.09278°N 3.16522°W

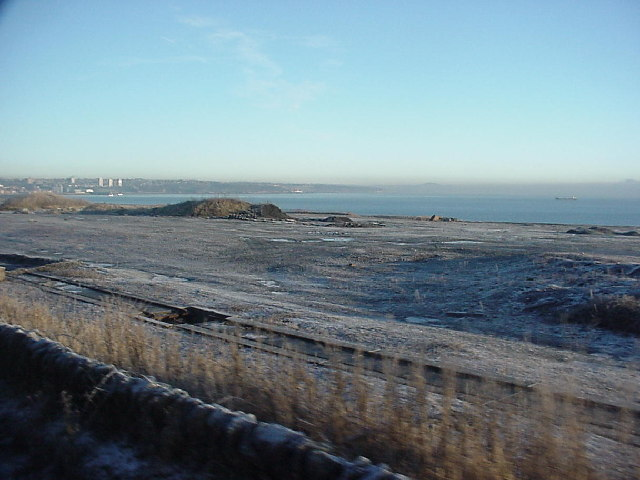
Site of the colliery, now a housing estate

Seafield Colliery was in Kirkcaldy, Fife, Scotland. Work on the colliery was started on 12 May 1954 and production began in 1966. On 10 May 1973, five men were killed when a roof collapsed. Despite it being said that it had a life of 150 years, with millions of tons, much of the coal being deep under the bed of the Firth of Forth, Seafield Colliery was closed in 1988. In September 1989, the Seafield Colliery twin towers were demolished.

Darts player Jocky Wilson, was once a miner at the colliery.

The site of the former colliery has been built over and is now a housing estate.
