= Willy Logie =

Belgian darts player

Personal information
- Born: 17 November 1952 (age 73) Antwerp, Belgium
- Home town: Boezinge, Belgium

Sport
- Sport: Darts
- Playing since: 1974
- Darts: 24g Datadart
- Laterality: Right-handed
- Walk-on music: "Rock and Roll" by Led Zeppelin

Organisation (see split in darts)
- BDO: 1983–1991
- WDF: 1983–1991

WDF major events – best performances
- World Championship: Last 16: 1985
- World Masters: Last 32: 1985

Other tournament wins
- Tournament: Years
- Swiss Open Spring Cup: 1985; 1986

Willy Logie (born 17 November 1952) is a Belgian former professional darts player who competed in the 1980s and 1990s.

== Career ==
He competed in the 1985 BDO World Darts Championship, beating Bob Sinnaeve in the first round before being defeated by Eric Bristow in the second round. His only other World Championship appearance came in 1986 when he lost in the first round to Finland's Kari Saukkonen. He also played in the 1985 Winmau World Masters, losing in the first round to Harry Patterson.

Logie had one ranked title success during his career - by winning the 1985 Swiss Open. He also won the 1986 Spring Cup, an unranked WDF event.

== World Championship performances ==
BDO

- 1985: Second Round: (lost to Eric Bristow 0–3) (sets)
- 1986: First Round: (lost to Kari Saukkonen 1–3)
