= 1989 BDO World Darts Championship =

Tournament information
- Dates: 6–14 January 1989
- Venue: Lakeside Country Club
- Location: Frimley Green, Surrey
- Country: England
- Organisation(s): BDO
- Format: Sets; Final – best of 11
- Prize fund: £86,900
- Winner's share: £20,000
- High checkout: 164 (England) Mike Gregory

Champion(s)
- (Scotland) Jocky Wilson

The 1989 BDO World Darts Championship (known for sponsorship reasons as The 1989 Embassy World Darts Championship) was the 12th World Professional Championships, and was staged at the Lakeside Country Club, Frimley Green, Surrey, England for the fourth successive year. The tournament was organised by the British Darts Organisation (BDO).

Following the 1988 World Masters ITV pulled all their coverage of darts and the BBC decided to withdraw their coverage of the 1988 British Professional Championship, meaning that this World Championship was the only televised darts tournament in 1989. The World Championship would remain the only annual televised event for the next four years.

In an attempt to improve the image of the game (which contributed to the loss of television coverage and sponsors), the BDO decided that players would no longer be allowed to drink alcohol during matches - allowing just water on the stage.

The tournament itself saw Jocky Wilson and Eric Bristow meet in the final after Wilson had beaten defending champion Bob Anderson and Bristow had seen off John Lowe in the semi-finals. Wilson raced into a five sets to nil lead, but Bristow took the next four sets to set up a tense finish - until, after missing several double attempts, Wilson finally took the title 6–4.

== Seeds ==
1. (England) Bob Anderson
2. (England) John Lowe
3. (England) Eric Bristow
4. (England) Mike Gregory
5. (Scotland) Jocky Wilson
6. (England) Peter Evison
7. (Australia) Russell Stewart
8. (England) Dave Whitcombe

== Prize money ==
The prize fund was £84,800.

Champion: £20,000
Runner-Up: £10,000
Semi-Finalists (2): £5,000
Quarter-Finalists (4): £2,600
Last 16 (8): £1,900
Last 32 (16): £1,200

There was also a 9 Dart Checkout prize of £52,000, along with a High Checkout prize of £1,000.

== The results ==
First Round (best of 5 sets)
1	(England) Bob Anderson (89.19)	3
(South Africa) Ken Summers (75.48)	0
(Australia) Wayne Weening (88.98)	3
(England) Cliff Lazarenko (86.37)	1
8	(England) Dave Whitcombe (87.51)	3
(Canada) Bob Sinnaeve (81.03)	0
(United States) Rick Ney (88.14)	3
(Belgium) Leo Laurens (86.16)	1
5	(Scotland) Jocky Wilson (89.28)	3
(England) Paul Reynolds (83.76)	0
(England) Alan Warriner (91.20)	3
(England) Arnie Bunn (78.90)	0
4	(England) Mike Gregory (92.07)	3
(Scotland) Peter McDonald (86.43)	0
(Sweden) Magnus Caris (80.40)	3
(Scotland) Trevor Nurse (78.48)	1
2	(England) John Lowe (90.15)	3
(England) Chris Whiting (82.08)	0
(Singapore) Paul Lim (88.23)	3
(Wales) Chris Johns (82.74)	0
7	(Australia) Russell Stewart (88.86)	3
(Wales) Eric Burden (84.81)	1
(England) Dennis Hickling (83.82)	3
(Netherlands) Bert Vlaardingerbroek (77.52)	0
6	(England) Peter Evison (80.94)	3
(Northern Ireland) Ray Farrell (81.99)	1
(Sweden) Lars Erik Karlsson (84.60)	3
(United States) Tony Payne (86.58)	2
3	(England) Eric Bristow (86.22)	3
(Canada) John Fallowfield (74.28)	1
(England) Steve Gittins (85.83)	3
(Finland) Kexi Heinäharju (75.84)	0

Second Round (best of 5 sets)
1	(England) Bob Anderson (99.96)	3
(Australia) Wayne Weening (89.22)	1
8	(England) Dave Whitcombe (84.63)	3
(United States) Rick Ney (79.92)	0
5	(Scotland) Jocky Wilson (88.38)	3
(England) Alan Warriner (87.54)	2
4	(England) Mike Gregory (91.56)	3
(Sweden) Magnus Caris (80.04)	0
2	(England) John Lowe (91.65)	3
(Singapore) Paul Lim (89.73)	2
7	(Australia) Russell Stewart (88.41)	0
(England) Dennis Hickling (95.67)	3
6	(England) Peter Evison (87.27)	3
(Sweden) Lars Erik Karlsson (77.37)	0
3	(England) Eric Bristow (89.01)	3
(England) Steve Gittins (86.19)	0

Quarter-Finals (best of 7 sets)
1	(England) Bob Anderson (92.91)	4
8	(England) Dave Whitcombe (88.71)	3
5	(Scotland) Jocky Wilson (85.32)	4
4	(England) Mike Gregory (89.04)	3
2	(England) John Lowe (92.19)	4
(England) Dennis Hickling (86.61)	0
6	(England) Peter Evison (88.11)	3
3	(England) Eric Bristow (90.39)	4

Semi-Finals (best of 9 sets)
1	(England) Bob Anderson (90.33)	4
5	(Scotland) Jocky Wilson (94.35)	5
2	(England) John Lowe (89.07)	1
3	(England) Eric Bristow (93.27)	5

Final (best of 11 sets)
5	(Scotland) Jocky Wilson (94.31)	6
3	(England) Eric Bristow (90.69)	4
