= Spring Cup (darts) =

Tournament information
- Location: Various
- Established: 1986
- Organisation(s): European Darts Council
- Month(s) Played: March / April
- Final Year: 2012

Final champion(s)
- Netherlands (men's team); Netherlands (women's team) (Belgium) Geert De Vos (men's singles); Aileen de Graaf (women's singles)

The Spring Cup was an international darts competition contested by nations from continental Europe which ran from 1986 to 2012. It was run by the European Darts Council and featured singles and team events for men and women.

== History ==
Held annually since 1986, the Spring Cup was run by the European Darts Council. It was the third largest competition for European nations behind the WDF World Cup and WDF Europe Cup. The competition was referred to as the 'small' Europe Cup since there were only singles and team events held for men and women.

Only the nations from continental Europe were allowed to enter. Established darting nations such as England, Scotland, Wales, Northern Ireland and Republic of Ireland were excluded so 'smaller' less established nations had a chance at success. There was no competition held in 1989 or 2002, but the 2009 edition was cancelled. The 2012 edition was the last. After some speculation, it was announced the competition would not return in 2013 as there were not enough countries willing to enter the competition.

The men's and women's singles events, held on the last day, are also individual tournaments which offer both winners entry in to the qualifying rounds for the World Masters.

== Competing nations ==
The following is a list of nations that had previously entered the Spring Cup;

- Austria
- Belgium
- Catalonia
- Czech Republic
- Denmark
- France
- Germany
- Gibraltar
- Hungary
- Luxembourg
- Netherlands
- Slovenia
- Spain
- Switzerland

== Winners ==
| Hosts | | Team Champions | Singles Champions | Ref |
|---|---|---|---|---|
| 1986 (Netherlands) | Men | Belgium | (Belgium) Willy Logie | |
| 1986 (Netherlands) | Women | Netherlands | (Netherlands) Valerie Maytum | |
| 1987 (Denmark) | Men | Belgium | (Belgium) Frans de Vooght | |
| 1987 (Denmark) | Women | Netherlands | (Netherlands) Mia Mevissen | |
| 1988 (France) | Men | Belgium | (Switzerland) Gaudenzdorfer Coray | |
| 1988 (France) | Women | Germany | (Netherlands) Valerie Maytum | |
| 1990 (Switzerland) | Men | Germany | (Germany) Bert Hansen | |
| 1990 (Switzerland) | Women | Germany | (Germany) Heike Ernst | |
| 1991 (Germany) | Men | Netherlands | (Netherlands) Raymond van Barneveld | |
| 1991 (Germany) | Women | Netherlands | (Netherlands) Francis Hoenselaar | |
| 1992 (Luxembourg) | Men | Belgium | (Switzerland) Walter Tschudin | |
| 1992 (Luxembourg) | Women | Germany | (Germany) Heike Ernst | |
| 1993 (Switzerland) | Men | Netherlands | (Netherlands) Bert Vlaardingerbroek | |
| 1993 (Switzerland) | Women | Germany | (Germany) Andrea Mejlsing | |
| 1994 (Netherlands) | Men | Netherlands | (Netherlands) Raymond van Barneveld | |
| 1994 (Netherlands) | Women | Netherlands | (Netherlands) Francis Hoenselaar | |
| 1995 (Netherlands) | Men | Netherlands | (Belgium) Bruno Raes | |
| 1995 (Netherlands) | Women | Germany | (Germany) Andrea Leipold | |
| 1996 (Belgium) | Men | Netherlands | (Netherlands) Co Stompé | |
| 1996 (Belgium) | Women | Netherlands | (Belgium) Vicky Pruim | |
| 1997 (France) | Men | Belgium | (Netherlands) Co Stompé | |
| 1997 (France) | Women | Netherlands | (Germany) Bianka shrub | |
| 1998 (Czech Republic) | Men | Netherlands | (Netherlands) Roland Scholten | |
| 1998 (Czech Republic) | Women | Germany | (Germany) Bianka shrub | |
| 1999 (Germany) | Men | Netherlands | (Netherlands) Raymond van Barneveld | |
| 1999 (Germany) | Women | Netherlands | (Germany) Heike Ernst | |
| 2000 (Luxembourg) | Men | Netherlands | (Netherlands) Raymond van Barneveld | |
| 2000 (Luxembourg) | Women | Netherlands | (Germany) Bianka shrub | |
| 2001 (Switzerland) | Men | Netherlands | (Netherlands) Raymond van Barneveld | |
| 2001 (Switzerland) | Women | Netherlands | (Netherlands) Francis Hoenselaar | |
| 2003 (Austria) | Men | Netherlands | (Netherlands) André Brantjes | |
| 2003 (Austria) | Women | Netherlands | (Germany) Heike Ernst | |
| 2004 (Belgium) | Men | Netherlands | (Netherlands) André Brantjes | |
| 2004 (Belgium) | Women | Netherlands | (Netherlands) Karin claws | |
| 2005 (Germany) | Men | Germany | (Belgium) John Snyers | |
| 2005 (Germany) | Women | Germany | (Germany) Heike Ernst | |
| 2006 (Netherlands) | Men | Netherlands | (Netherlands) Mario Robbe | |
| 2006 (Netherlands) | Women | Netherlands | (Belgium) Sandra Pollet | |
| 2007 (Belgium) | Men | Netherlands | (Belgium) Geert De Vos | |
| 2007 (Belgium) | Women | Netherlands | (Netherlands) Rilana Erades | |
| 2008 (Austria) | Men | Netherlands | (Germany) Andree Welge | |
| 2008 (Austria) | Women | Netherlands | (Netherlands) Rilana Erades | |
| 2009 (Spain) | Cancelled | | | |
| 2010 (Hungary) | Men | Belgium | (Belgium) Ronny Huybrechts | |
| 2010 (Hungary) | Women | Netherlands | (Germany) Stefanie Lück | |
| 2011 (Luxembourg) | Men | Netherlands | (Netherlands) Christian Kist | |
| 2011 (Luxembourg) | Women | Netherlands | (Netherlands) Floor van Zanten | |
| 2012 (Austria) | Men | Netherlands | (Belgium) Geert De Vos | |
| 2012 (Austria) | Women | Netherlands | (Netherlands) Aileen de Graaf | |
