= Rab Scott =

English darts player (1956–2021)

Personal information
- Full name: Richard Scott
- Born: 14 November 1956 Clacton-on-Sea, England
- Died: May 2021 (aged 64)
- Home town: Clacton-on-Sea, England

Sport
- Sport: Darts
- Playing since: 1974
- Darts: 18g
- Laterality: Right-handed
- Walk-on music: "Paint It Black" by The Rolling Stones

Organisation (see split in darts)
- BDO: 1980–1985

WDF major events – best performances
- World Championship: Last 32: 1984, 1985

Richard "Rab" Scott (14 November 1956 – May 2021) was an English professional darts player who competed in the 1980s.

== Career ==
Scott twice competed in the BDO World Darts Championship but was defeated in the first round by the fellow Englishmen Alan Glazier in 1984 and John Cosnett in 1985.

Scott was also registered for Walton in the Essex Men's Superleague. Scott quit the BDO in 1985.

== World Championship results ==
=== BDO ===
- 1984: Last 32: (lost to Alan Glazier 1–2) (sets)
- 1985: Last 32: (lost to John Cosnett 0–2)
