= Ronnie Sharp =

Scottish darts player (born 1957)

Personal information
- Nickname: "Pancho"
- Born: 1 April 1957 (age 69) Dundee, Scotland
- Home town: Irvine, North Ayrshire, Scotland

Sport
- Sport: Darts
- Playing since: 1975
- Darts: 24 Gram Target Signature
- Laterality: Right-handed
- Walk-on music: "Here I Go Again" by Whitesnake

Organisation (see split in darts)
- BDO: 1985–1997, 2005–2019
- PDC: 2021–
- Current world ranking: NR (11 November 2021)

WDF major events – best performances
- World Championship: Semi Finals: 1994
- World Masters: Last 32: 1985, 1987, 1988

Other tournament wins
- Tournament: Years
- WDF Europe Cup Pairs: 1992

Ronnie Sharp (born 1 April 1957) is a Scottish professional darts player who plays in events of the Professional Darts Corporation (PDC). He previously competed in the British Darts Organisation (BDO) and is the former captain of Scotland. Sharp was nicknamed Pancho due to his moustache which resembled that of Francisco "Pancho" Villa.

== Career ==
Sharp made three appearances in the Winmau World Masters before making his World Championship debut in 1990, reaching the quarter finals. He defeated Kim Jensen and John Lowe before losing to Phil Taylor, who went on to win his first world title and dominate the sport. In 1991, he lost in the first round to Cliff Lazarenko. He failed to qualify for the 1992 World Championship, but returned in 1993, beating Peter Hunt in the first round but lost in the second round to Alan Warriner.

It was the 1994 World Championship where Sharp recorded his best performance. The sport suffered a split with the BDO's top players forming a new governing body called the World Darts Council (later known as the Professional Darts Corporation). With the big names gone, Sharp was one of those who took advantage. After beating Trevor Nurse in the first round, he defeated Roland Scholten, the only seed to progress through round one in the second round. He then beat Denmark's Troels Rusel in the quarter finals before losing to Canada's John Part 5–1 in sets. Sharp was the only player to win a set against eventual champion Part in the entire tournament. Sharp did not progress further in his career, reaching only the second round in the 1995 World Championship and then quietly disappeared from the scene. He did appear on TV's Bullseye series 13 where he achieved a score of 328. Due to it being 301 or more, the programme doubled this amount to £656 which was given to the contestants' chosen charity, the Kent Air Ambulance Air Appeal.

Sharp then made a comeback in the 2006 Scotland National Championship, reaching the quarter finals. He then played in the 2006 World Masters but lost in the first round to Jarkko Komula. He returned to the Scotland National Championship in 2008, but lost in the first round to the tournament's eventual winner Mike Veitch. He most recently played in the 2008 Welsh Open, reaching the last 128 stage. Ronnie currently enjoys playing with Towerlands Sports Club in the Dreghorn League and is heavily involved with darts at county level selecting and playing for Ayrshire county team.

Sharp later started playing again, rejoining the Professional Darts Corporation on 6 November 2021.

== World Championship results ==
=== BDO ===
- 1990: Quarter Finals (lost to Phil Taylor 2–4) (sets)
- 1991: 1st Round (lost to Cliff Lazarenko 0–3)
- 1993: 2nd Round (lost to Alan Warriner-Little 1–3)
- 1994: Semi Finals (lost to John Part 1–5)
- 1995: 2nd Round (lost to Andy Fordham 2–3)
