= Jocky Wilson =

Scottish darts player (1950–2012)

- Wilson in the final of the 1989 BDO World Darts Championships

Personal information
- Full name: John Thomas Wilson
- Born: 22 March 1950 Kirkcaldy, Scotland
- Died: 24 March 2012 (aged 62) Kirkcaldy, Scotland

Sport
- Sport: Darts
- Playing since: 1972
- Darts: 21g Datadart
- Laterality: Right-handed
- Walk-on music: "Eye of the Tiger" by Survivor

Organisation (see split in darts)
- BDO: 1978–1993
- PDC: 1993–1996 (founding member)

WDF major events – best performances
- World Championship: Winner (2): 1982, 1989
- World Masters: Runner-up: 1982, 1990

PDC premier events – best performances
- World Championship: Last 24 Group: 1994, 1995
- World Matchplay: Quarter-final: 1994

Other tournament wins
- Years
Autumn Gold Cider Masters	1985
British Open	1982
Bullseye Darts Ch'ship	1980, 1981
Finnish Open	1986
Jersey Festival of Darts	1980
MFI World Pairs	1988
Scottish Masters	1980, 1983, 1984
Best Old Major results:
British Professional	1981, 1983, 1986, 1988
British Matchplay	1980, 1981
Medal record
Men's Darts
Representing Scotland
WDF Europe Cup
Gold medal – first place	1978 Copenhagen	Men's team
Silver medal – second place	1978 Copenhagen	Men's singles
Silver medal – second place	1988 Yarmouth	Men's team
Bronze medal – third place	1980 Ebbw Vale	Men's singles
Bronze medal – third place	1980 Ebbw Vale	Men's pairs
Bronze medal – third place	1980 Ebbw Vale	Men's team
Bronze medal – third place	1982 Westcliff-on-Sea	Men's pairs
Bronze medal – third place	1982 Westcliff-on-Sea	Men's team
Bronze medal – third place	1984 The Hague	Men's team
Bronze medal – third place	1986 Turku	Men's team
Bronze medal – third place	1988 Yarmouth	Men's singles
- Updated on 1 September 2021

John Thomas "Jocky" Wilson (22 March 1950 – 24 March 2012) was a Scottish professional darts player. After turning professional in 1979, he quickly rose to the top of the game, winning the World Professional Darts Championship in 1982, then again in 1989. Wilson competed in all major darts tournaments of the era and won the British Professional Championship a record four times between 1981 and 1988.

A contemporary and rival of Eric Bristow, Bob Anderson and John Lowe, Wilson's ungainly appearance and rough-hewn lifestyle belied his prowess in the sport. He was dogged by health problems, however, and suddenly retired from the game in December 1995. He withdrew from public life and rarely appeared in public or gave interviews before his death in March 2012.

In 2022 the new World Seniors Darts Championships was launched with the trophy engraved with the names of four deceased former World Champions on the darts: Wilson, Bristow, Leighton Rees and Andy Fordham.

== Early life ==
As a child, Wilson's parents were deemed unfit to raise him and Wilson spent much of his childhood in an orphanage.

Wilson served in the British Army from 1966 to 1968. He also worked as a coalman, a fish processor, and a miner at Kirkcaldy's Seafield Colliery. In 1979, during a period of unemployment, he entered a darts competition at Butlins, Ayrshire, which he went on to win, claiming the top prize of £500, (worth around £2,300 in 2024). After his success in this tournament, he turned professional.

== Career ==
=== Peak ===
In 1981, Wilson beat world number one Eric Bristow and Cliff Lazarenko of England in the BDO Nations Cup final. His Scotland teammates in the 5–4 win were captain Rab Smith and Angus Ross.

His greatest achievements came in the World Championships, first in 1982 where he beat Lowe 5–3 in the final, and then seven years later, when he beat his other great rival Bristow 6–4 in a classic match, where Bristow had recovered from 5–0 down to 5–4 and 2–2 in the tenth set. This was to be the Scot's last taste of success in a major event although the odd final appearance still came over the next few years.

His record at the World Championship was one of great consistency. From his debut in 1979 until 1991 he managed to reach at least the quarter-finals on every single occasion. He was quarter-finalist eight times (1979, 1980, 1981, 1985, 1986, 1988, 1990, 1991) and three-times a losing semi-finalist (1983, 1984, 1987) in addition to his two World titles. In 1992 and 1993 he suffered first round defeats for the only time at the Lakeside Country Club.

He made several guest appearances on television including the popular darts themed quiz show Bullseye hosted by Jim Bowen, and produced by Central Television.

External videos
- World Darts Championship Wilson v Lazarenko. A bad tempered match, with a glimpse of good sportsmanship.

In the television documentary Eric Bristow: Sports Life Stories, Bristow described various psychological ploys he used against his opponents to "scramble their heads". He added that in response the only two opponents who would look him in the eye at the handshake at the start of a game were Wilson and Lowe, saying that like himself they had "no fear". He also referred to Wilson's unorthodox style such as a tendency to jerk his shoulder on throwing the third dart. Bristow commented that it seemed to have no detrimental effect on the accuracy, describing Wilson as "a one off". Bristow stated though that Wilson's sporting demise was due to the increasing volumes of alcoholic spirits Wilson would consume remarking, 'At the end he was doing a 40 oz bottle'.

=== Darts split ===
Wilson joined the other top professionals who split away from the ruling British Darts Organisation in 1993 to form the WDC (now Professional Darts Corporation). He was not able to recapture the form that took him to two world championships however, and only participated in two PDC World Championships, failing to win a single match. He lost both group games in 1994 (to Dennis Priestley and Graeme Stoddart) and again in 1995 (to Priestley and Lowe).

One of the highlights of Wilson's three years in the WDC was him reaching the final of the 1993 WDC Skol UK Matchplay in March 1993, which was broadcast on ITV and played on quadro dartboards. Wilson became one of the few players to have hit 240 on television during a visit to the dart board, by getting 3 darts in the quadruple 20, during his semi final victory over John Lowe. Wilson lost the final to Dennis Priestley.

Wilson reached the quarter-finals of the 1994 World Matchplay, losing to eventual champion Larry Butler. Wilson's final appearance in a televised tournament came in the 1995 World Matchplay. He beat Rod Harrington 8–4 in the first round, but in his final televised major, lost to Nigel Justice in the second round.

== Post-retirement ==
Although Wilson never formally announced his retirement, he stopped competing professionally on 23 December 1995, after being diagnosed with diabetes, which stopped him from drinking during games.

For ten years during his darts career, Wilson had a house in Wallsend to cut down on travel expenses, but he left that to return to his native Kirkcaldy. He was declared bankrupt in 1998, and then survived on disability allowance, living as a recluse in a one-bedroom flat back on the council estate where he grew up. He also suffered from arthritis in his hands.

Wilson ceased giving interviews to the press and television. An Observer reporter tried to interview him in January 2007 on the twenty-fifth anniversary of his first title win, only to be told by his wife, "He never has (given an interview) since stopping and never will. He thinks it's all in the past, it's over with." However, Wilson spoke briefly to The Scotsman in 2001. Despite his withdrawal from darts, in August 2009, the PDC announced a new tournament called "The Jocky Wilson Cup" in which Scotland's best players played England's best. England beat Scotland 6–0 in the inaugural tournament in December 2009.

A heavy smoker for 40 years, in November 2009 it was announced that Wilson had been diagnosed with chronic obstructive pulmonary disease. Reports stated that he had smoked up to 50 cigarettes a day for most of his life. He died just after 21:00 on 24 March 2012 at his home in Kirkcaldy, two days after his sixty-second birthday. His funeral was held on 2 April at Kirkcaldy Crematorium.

Many stories of Jocky Wilson tell of his heavy drinking. John Lowe said of Wilson "one minute he could be the nicest man on Earth and the next extremely offensive, to say the least. I've lost count of the amount of times he'd come up to me and said 'Sorry about last night'. I would always reply 'why? What did you do?' and he'd say 'oh it wasn't you then?' He would then proceed to apologise to everyone he'd been with the previous night, until he found out if he'd upset anyone". In 1982, Jocky was banned for several months for "insulting behaviour" towards an official. Just before going onstage for a World Cup match in 1983, Jocky Wilson ran towards Eric Bristow and kicked him hard. The two were separated by officials and entered the stage to play their match. After Eric had beaten him, Jocky said "I've got to try to beat you somehow". Bristow said "One minute I wanted to tear him apart, the next we were at the bar having a drink". Bristow said "deep down, I think he liked me, and I had a soft spot for him".

Away from the darts world, Wilson was very different. "He was a lovely, quiet, firm family man," said Denis Madden, who conducted Wilson's funeral service. Madden went on to say "Jocky Wilson never wanted to become famous or in the spotlight. Jocky would be the first to tell you that work in its own right was a means to an end, all he wanted out of it was to provide well for his wife and family."

== Personal life ==
In 1982, during the Falklands War, Wilson was banned from competing in darts tournaments after he clashed with an official during a championship. According to Wilson's obituary in The Scotsman, this resulted from a remark allegedly by the official relating to Wilson's wife, who was named Malvina (the Argentine name for the Falkland Islands is "Islas Malvinas"). He received a ban of several months which stopped him from defending his Unipart trophy title.

Wilson frequently consumed sweets and generally refused to brush his teeth, stating: "My Gran told me the English poison the water". He had lost his last tooth by the age of 28. Following his 1982 World title win, he paid £1,200 for dentures, but later complained that the dentures made him belch when drinking.

== World Championship results ==
=== BDO ===
- 1979: Quarter-final (lost to John Lowe 1–3)
- 1980: Quarter-final (lost to Eric Bristow 0–3)
- 1981: Quarter-final (lost to Tony Brown 2–4)
- 1982: Winner (beat John Lowe 5–3)
- 1983: 3rd place (beat Tony Brown 2–0; lost in semi-final to Keith Deller 3–5)
- 1984: Semi-final (lost to Dave Whitcombe 5–6)
- 1985: Quarter-final (lost to Dave Whitcombe 3–4)
- 1986: Quarter-final (lost to Dave Whitcombe 2–4)
- 1987: Semi-final (lost to John Lowe 0–5)
- 1988: Quarter-final (lost to Eric Bristow 2–4)
- 1989: Winner (beat Eric Bristow 6–4)
- 1990: Quarter-final (lost to Mike Gregory 3–4)
- 1991: Quarter-final (lost to Kevin Kenny 3–4)
- 1992: First round (lost to Kevin Kenny 1–3)
- 1993: First round (lost to Dennis Priestley 0–3)

=== PDC ===
- 1994: Group stage (lost both group games to Dennis Priestley and Graeme Stoddart)
- 1995: Group stage (lost both group games to Dennis Priestley and John Lowe)

== Career finals ==
=== BDO ===
Wilson appeared in BDO major finals 12 times with a record of 8 wins and 4 runners-up.

Legend
World Championship (2–0)
World Masters (0–2)
British Professional (4–0)
World Matchplay (0–1)
Grand Masters (0–1)
British Matchplay (2–0)

Outcome	No.	Year	Championship	Opponent in the final	Score (Note: (l) = score in legs, (s) = score in sets.)
Winner	1.	1980	British Matchplay (1)	(Wales) Leighton Rees	2–0 (s)
Winner	2.	1981	British Matchplay (2)	(England) Cliff Lazarenko	2–0 (s)
Winner	3.	1981	British Professional Championship (1)	(England) John Lowe	6–5 (s)
Winner	4.	1982	BDO World Championship (1)	(England) John Lowe	5–3 (s)
Runner-up	1.	1982	World Masters	(England) Dave Whitcombe	1–2 (s)
Winner	5.	1983	British Professional Championship (2)	(England) Dave Whitcombe	7–2 (s)
Runner-up	2.	1983	Butlins Grand Masters (5)	(England) Eric Bristow	1–5 (l)
Winner	6.	1986	British Professional Championship (3)	(England) Dave Whitcombe	7–6 (s)
Runner-up	3.	1986	MFI World Matchplay (1)	(England) Mike Gregory	1–5 (s)
Winner	7.	1988	British Professional Championship (4)	(England) Ray Battye	7–2 (s)
Winner	8.	1989	BDO World Championship (2)	(England) Eric Bristow	6–4 (s)
Runner-up	4.	1990	World Masters	(England) Phil Taylor	2–3 (s)

=== WDF major finals: 3 (3 runners-up) ===
Legend
World Cup (0–2)
Europe Cup (0–1)

Outcome	No.	Year	Championship	Opponent in the final	Score
Runner-up	1.	1978	Europe Cup Singles	(England) John Lowe	1–4 (l)
Runner-up	2.	1981	World Cup Singles	(England) John Lowe	3–4 (l)
Runner-up	3.	1983	World Cup Singles	(England) Eric Bristow	2–4 (l)

== Performance timeline ==
Wilson's performance timeline is as follows:

=== BDO ===
Tournament	1977	1978	1979	1980	1981	1982	1983	1984	1985	1986	1987	1988	1989	1990	1991	1992	1993
BDO World Championship	NYF	DNP	QF	QF	QF	W	SF	SF	QF	QF	SF	QF	W	QF	QF	1R	1R
World Masters	1R	RR	1R	SF	QF	F	4R	4R	2R	SF	QF	QF	SF	F	1R	DNP	
British Matchplay	DNP		SF	W	W	QF	QF	QF	QF	SF	QF	QF	SF	DNP	SF	DNP	
British Professional	Not held				W	DNP	W	SF	QF	W	QF	W	Not held				
Butlins Grand Masters	DNP	QF	SF	QF	SF	QF	F	1R	1R	1R	Not held						
MFI World Matchplay	Not held							1R	1R	F	QF	QF	Not held				
News of the World	???	SF	???			SF	???						QF	???	Not held		

=== WDF ===
WDF majors performances
Tournament	Event	World Cup 1977	Euro Cup 1978	World Cup 1979	Euro Cup 1980	World Cup 1981	Euro Cup 1982	World Cup 1983	Euro Cup 1984	World Cup 1985	Euro Cup 1986	World Cup 1987	Euro Cup 1988	World Cup 1989	Euro Cup 1990	World Cup 1991	Euro Cup 1992
WDF World Cup & WDF Europe Cup	Singles	L32	F	QF	SF	F	QF	F	Prelim.	L64	QF	DNP	SF	Prelim.	DNP	L32	L32
WDF World Cup & WDF Europe Cup	Pairs	?	L16	L16	SF	L16	SF	F	L16	L32	L16	DNP	?	?	DNP	?	L16
WDF World Cup & WDF Europe Cup	Team	QF	W	QF	SF	F	SF	F	SF	SF	SF	DNP	F	QF	DNP	QF	RR
WDF World Cup & WDF Europe Cup	Overall	5th	F	6th	3rd	F	3rd	F	6th	4th	3rd	DNP	3rd	8th	DNP	6th	4th

=== PDC ===
Tournament	1994	1995
PDC World Championship	RR	RR
World Matchplay	QF	2R

Performance Table Legend
W	Won the tournament	F	Finalist	SF	Semifinalist	QF	Quarterfinalist	#R; RR; L#	Lost in # round Round-robin; Last # stage	DQ	Disqualified
DNQ	Did not qualify	DNP	Did not participate	WD	Withdrew	NH	Tournament not held	#R; RR; L#	Lost in # round Round-robin; Last # stage	NYF	Not yet founded
