= Ceri Morgan =

Welsh darts player (1947–2020)

Personal information
- Full name: Ceri Rhys Morgan
- Nickname: The Red Dragon
- Born: 22 December 1947 Treorchy, Wales
- Died: 29 February 2020 (aged 72) Cardiff, Wales

Sport
- Sport: Darts
- Playing since: 1967
- Darts: 24g
- Laterality: Right-handed
- Walk-on music: "Easy Lover" by Phil Collins and Philip Bailey

Organisation (see split in darts)
- BDO: 1978–1990

WDF major events – best performances
- World Championship: Quarter Final: 1980, 1981, 1984
- World Masters: Semi Final: 1982

Other tournament wins
- Tournament: Years
- BDO British Masters Welsh Open: 1980; 1980

Ceri Rhys Morgan (22 December 1947 – 29 February 2020) was a Welsh professional darts player who competed in British Darts Organisation (BDO) events in the 1970s, 1980s and 1990s.

== Career ==
Morgan made his World Championship debut in 1979, beating Barry Atkinson in the first round before losing to Tony Brown in the second round. In 1980, Morgan reached the quarter-final, where, as the number 8 seed, he began his campaign in the second round where he defeated Alan Grant before losing to Cliff Lazarenko. He repeated his best ever performances at the World Championships in 1981 and 1984 by reaching the quarter-finals. He lost to John Lowe on both occasions.

His last appearance at the World Championships came in 1987 with a first round defeat by Jocky Wilson.

One of his biggest paydays came in 1980, when he won the Austin Morris British Masters against Bobby George, the top prize being a £5,500 car from the tournament sponsors. As Morgan did not drive, the sponsors made the offer of a cash option instead.

Morgan hit the highest shot out of the 1983 Unipart British Professional Championships against Steve Brennan with a 170, and in 1986, reached the semi-finals of the same tournament. He was runner-up to Nicky Virachkul in the 1979 World Cup Singles and reached the semi-finals of the World Masters in 1982.

Morgan quit the BDO in 1990.

== World Championship results ==
=== BDO ===
- 1979: Second round (lost to Tony Brown 0–2) (sets)
- 1980: Quarter-finals (lost to Cliff Lazarenko 1–3)
- 1981: Quarter-finals (lost to John Lowe 3–4)
- 1983: First round (lost to Luc Marreel 0–2)
- 1984: Quarter-finals (lost to John Lowe 0–5)
- 1985: First round (lost to Steve Brennan 0–2)
- 1986: Second round (lost to Dave Whitcombe 2–3)
- 1987: First round (lost to Jocky Wilson 0–3)

== Career finals ==
=== WDF major finals: 1 (1 runner-up) ===
Outcome	No.	Year	Championship	Opponent in the final	Score
Runner-up	1.	1979	World Cup Singles	(United States) Nicky Virachkul	3–4 (l)
