= Bobby George =

English darts player (born 1945)

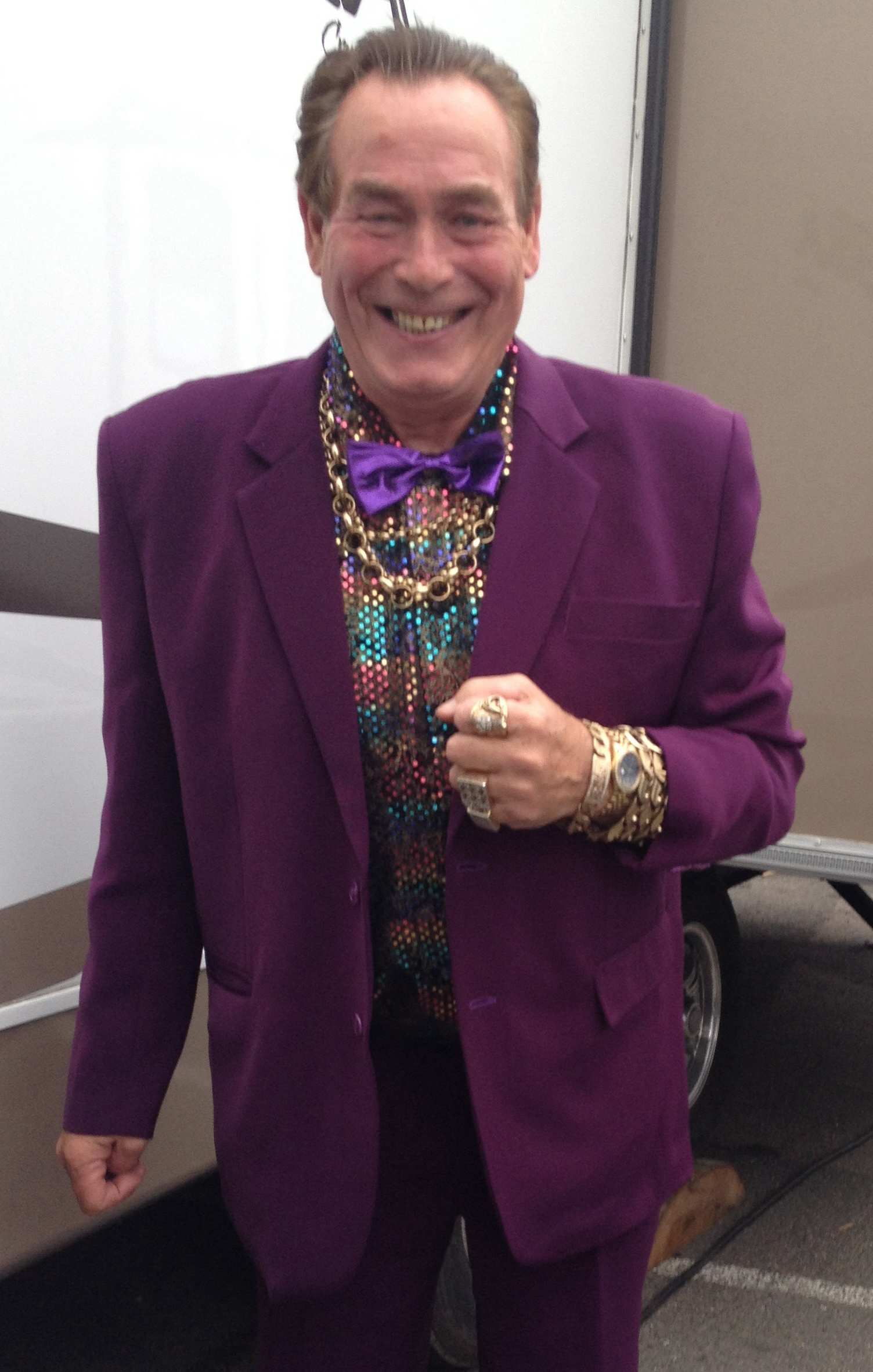
- George in April 2014

Personal information
- Full name: Robert Francis George
- Nicknames: King of Bling; Bobby Dazzler; Mr Glitter
- Born: 16 December 1945 (age 80) Manor Park, London, England
- Home town: London, England

Sport
- Sport: Darts
- Playing since: 1976
- Darts: Winmau 23g Bobby George
- Laterality: Right-handed
- Walk-on music: "We Are the Champions" by Queen

Organisation (see split in darts)
- BDO: 1977–2009

WDF major events – best performances
- World Championship: Runner-up: 1980, 1994
- World Masters: Semi-final: 1979
- World Trophy: Last 32: 2002
- Int. Darts League: Last 32 Group: 2005

Other tournament wins
- Years
Essex Masters	1976. 1977, 1978
Hainault Super League Singles	1976
Butlins Grand Masters	1979, 1980
News of the World Darts Ch'ship	1979, 1986
North American Open	1978
Santa Monica Open	1980
WDF Europe Cup Singles	1982
WDF Europe Cup Team	1982

Robert Francis George (born 16 December 1945) is an English television presenter and former professional darts player. He is widely recognised as one of the game's biggest personalities, known for his flamboyant entrances in which the "King of Darts" makes his way to the stage bedecked in jewellery, wearing a crown and cloak and holding a candelabra to the Queen song "We Are the Champions".

George won several leading major darts tournaments; he won the News of the World Darts Championship twice and appeared in two BDO Darts World Championship finals and was the first full-time exhibition player.

Since 1998, George has also worked for the BBC as a co-presenter and promoter of the game in their coverage of darts tournaments.

== Darts career ==
George took up darts at the age of 30, and quickly improved, winning the first tournament he entered, and making his first appearance at the World Masters less than a year later. He has won several major tournaments, including the News of the World Championship in 1979 and 1986, the Butlins Grand Masters in 1979 and 1980, the North American Open in 1978, and he was WDF Europe Cup champion in 1982 beating Eric Bristow in the final. George's News of the World victory in 1979 came without dropping a single leg, the only player to do so. Winning the 1979 final with a 100.20 average. George was the first player to get over 100 average on television. Playing for England, he won the Nations Cup in 1980, as part of an England triples team with Tony Brown and John Lowe, but had to withdraw in 1981 because of a ruptured spleen, which nearly killed him.

George reached the final of the BDO World Darts Championship in 1980 at his first attempt, beating Dave Whitcombe, Leighton Rees and Cliff Lazarenko. His opponent in the final was Eric Bristow. George led the match 1–0, 2–1 and 3–2 in sets, before Bristow edged ahead 4–3. At 2–2 in legs in the eighth set, George missed an opportunity to take the match to a decider. On 66 with one dart in hand, he miscounted and hit treble-16 instead of treble-10, thus leaving himself the trickier double-9 instead of double-18. On his next throw for double-9, George hit single-9 with his first dart and then bust his score by hitting single-20, leaving Bristow with three darts for the championship, which he duly converted with his second dart to seal a 5–3 victory.

George reached his second and last world final in 1994. After beating Russell Stewart and Martin Phillips, he broke his back when celebrating winning a set during his quarter final match against Kevin Kenny. George got through that match against Kenny by 4–2 in sets, having damaged his back when celebrating going 3–2 up. In his semi final match against Magnus Caris, George went two sets up, but then lost the next four sets and the opening two legs of the seventh set. When Caris missed a dart at double 18 to win the match, George responded by winning nine legs in a row to win the match 5–4 in sets. Competing in the final against doctor's advice, wearing a steel corset, George lost 0–6 to John Part playing in extreme pain. A few weeks after that final, it was found that he had literally broken his back and had to have eight titanium screws inserted into the base of his spine just so that he could stand upright.

== Television work ==
Since 1998, George has been a co-presenter and pundit on the BBC darts coverage, primarily of the BDO World Championship. He has also made several other television appearances, not all relating to darts. In 2002, he played himself in Sean Lock's sitcom 15 Storeys High, while in 2004, he starred in the comedy film One Man and His Dog, and later followed in the footsteps of fellow professional darts player Andy Fordham by taking part in the ITV programme Celebrity Fit Club. In 2006, he appeared in a regular segment of Brainiac: Science Abuse series 4, in which he played darts in order to explode caravans. He was also a team captain in Showbiz Darts again alongside Fordham. In 2007, he appeared with celebrity TV show, Don’t Call Me Stupid, with Vanessa Feltz.

In 2010, George performed Run DMC's Walk this Way on Let's Dance for Sport Relief with Tony O'Shea, Willie Thorne and Dennis Taylor. His colourful character has enabled George to be successful on the darts exhibition circuit, being introduced to it, and money races by his friend Tommy O'Regan.

In 2009, he teamed up with Bristow and John Lowe to tour theatres around the UK and Ireland, appearing in a show named Legends of the Oche which was presented and hosted by comedian Duncan Norvelle. He appeared in a 2009 episode of BBC's Cash in the Attic.

In January and February 2016, George appeared in the three-part BBC series The Real Marigold Hotel, which followed a group of celebrity senior citizens including Miriam Margolyes and Wayne Sleep on a journey to India. He also appeared on The Real Marigold on Tour, visiting Florida and Kyoto in 2016, Chengdu and Havana in 2017, and St. Petersburg in 2019.

In November 2017, George appeared on Gone to Pot: American Road Trip in which five celebrities (mainly older aged) go across California and Colorado to find out how cannabis can be used medicinally and how it would affect the UK if it was legalised.

== Personal life ==
George was born in Manor Park, London. After leaving school, he had various jobs including as a nightclub bouncer, floor layer, and builder, he was a tunneler working as a lead miner on the Victoria line before taking up darts at the age of 30.

George lives with his wife and manager Marie and their two sons at George Hall in Ardleigh, Essex. The layout of the rooms has been designed to look like a dart, and above the front door is a stained glass dartboard. George is a keen fisherman, and within the George Hall grounds are well-stocked fishing lakes.

His son Richie is also a former professional darts player; he reached the semi-final of the 2013 BDO World Darts Championship, losing to eventual champion Scott Waites.

George has worked as an ambassador for basic arithmetic, touring schools teaching children how darts can help with counting skills.

== Tournament wins ==
George's tournament wins are:

- North American Open: 1978
- News of the World Darts Championship: 1979, 1986
- Butlins Grand Masters: 1979, 1980
- WDF Europe Cup Singles: 1982
- WDF Europe Cup Team: 1982

== World Championship results ==
George's World Championship results are:

=== BDO ===
- 1980: Runner Up (lost to Eric Bristow 3–5)
- 1981: Quarter-finals (lost to Cliff Lazarenko 0–4)
- 1982: Semi-finals (lost to John Lowe 1–4)
- 1983: First round (lost to Tony Brown 0–2)
- 1984: First round (lost to Malcolm Davies 1–2)
- 1985: Second round (lost to Fred McMullan 1–3)
- 1986: First round (lost to Bob Anderson 0–3)
- 1987: First round (lost to John Lowe 0–3)
- 1993: Semi-finals (lost to John Lowe 3–5)
- 1994: Runner Up (lost to John Part 0–6)
- 1995: First round (lost to Ronnie Sharp 0–3)
- 1997: Second round (lost to Roland Scholten 0–3)
- 1998: Second round (lost to Sean Palfrey 2–3)
- 2000: Second round (lost to Ronnie Baxter 2–3)
- 2002: First round (lost to Raymond van Barneveld 1–3)

== Career statistics ==
George's career statistics are:

=== BDO major finals: 4 (2 titles) ===
Legend
World Championship (0–2)
Grand Masters (2–0)

Outcome	No.	Year	Championship	Opponent in the final	Score (Note: (l) = score in legs, (s) = score in sets.)
Winner	1.	1979	Butlins Grand Masters	(England) Bill Lennard	unknown
Runner-up	1.	1980	World Championship	(England) Eric Bristow	3–5 (s)
Winner	2.	1980	Butlins Grand Masters	(Wales) Leighton Rees	unknown
Runner-up	2.	1994	World Championship	(Canada) John Part	0–6 (s)

=== WDF major finals: 1 (1 title) ===
Outcome	No.	Year	Championship	Opponent in the final	Score
Winner	1.	1982	Europe Cup Singles	(England) Eric Bristow	4–1 (l)

=== Independent major finals: 2 (2 titles) ===
Outcome	No.	Year	Championship	Opponent in the final	Score
Winner	1.	1979	News of the World Championship	(England) Alan Glazier	2–0 (l)
Winner	2.	1986	News of the World Championship	(United States) Rick Ney	2–0 (l)

== Performance timeline ==
George's performance timeline is:

Performance Table Legend
W	Won the tournament	F	Finalist	SF	Semifinalist	QF	Quarterfinalist	#R; RR; Prel.	Lost in # round Round-robin; Preliminary round	DQ	Disqualified
DNQ	Did not qualify	DNP	Did not participate	WD	Withdrew	NH	Tournament not held	#R; RR; Prel.	Lost in # round Round-robin; Preliminary round	NYF	Not yet founded

Tournament	1977	1978	1979	1980	1981	1982	1983	1984	1985	1986	1987	1988	1989	1990	1991	1992	1993	1994	1995	1996	1997	1998	1999	2000	2001	2002	2003	2004	2005	2006	2007	2008	2009
BDO World Championship	NYF	DNQ		F	QF	SF	1R	1R	2R	1R	1R	DNQ					SF	F	1R	DNQ	2R	2R	DNQ	2R	DNQ	1R	DNQ						
World Masters	QF	Prel.	SF	3R	2R	QF	1R	3R	3R	DNP						2R	3R	2R	DNP	3R	2R	4R	1R	DNP		1R	1R	2R	4R	Prel.	2R	DNP	2R
British Matchplay	DNP		SF	QF	SF	QF	QF	Did not play															Not held										
British Professional	Not held				2R	2R	QF	1R	2R	DNP			Not held																				
Butlins Grand Masters	DNP		W	W	QF	SF	1R	1R	1R	DNP	Not held																						
MFI World Matchplay	Not held							1R	1R	DNP			Not held																				
World Darts Trophy	Not held																									1R	DNP					Not held	
International Darts League	Not held																										DNP		RR	DNP		Not held	
News of the World	???	1R	W	QF	???	QF	???			W	???				Not held						DNP	Not held											

WDF majors performances
Tournament	Event	Euro Cup 1982	Source
WDF World Cup & WDF Europe Cup	Singles	W	
WDF World Cup & WDF Europe Cup	Pairs	SF	
WDF World Cup & WDF Europe Cup	Team	W	
WDF World Cup & WDF Europe Cup	Overall	W	

Performance Table Legend
W	Won the tournament	F	Finalist	SF	Semifinalist	QF	Quarterfinalist	#R; RR; L#	Lost in # round Round-robin; Last # stage	DQ	Disqualified
DNQ	Did not qualify	DNP	Did not participate	WD	Withdrew	NH	Tournament not held	#R; RR; L#	Lost in # round Round-robin; Last # stage	NYF	Not yet founded

Records
Unknown	World record highest televised average 2 June 1979 – 17 September 1983	Succeeded by Eric Bristow
