= British Professional Championship =

Tournament information
- Venue: Fiesta Club Stockton-on-Tees (1981), Gaskins Conference Centre Middlesbrough (1982), Coatham Bowl Redcar (1983–88)
- Country: (United Kingdom) Great Britain
- Established: 1981
- Organisation(s): BDO Major (8 editions)
- Format: Sets
- Final Year: 1988

Final champion(s)
- (Scotland) Jocky Wilson

The British Professional Championship was a darts tournament organised by the British Darts Organisation and televised by the BBC between 1981 and 1988. After the 1988 championships, the BBC withdrew their coverage of the event and it left UK terrestrial television with only one televised tournament – the World Championships. The game was at an all-time low and players eventually went on to set up the World Darts Council in an attempt to bring back sponsors and television.

Jocky Wilson won the title a record four times – John Lowe also reached four finals but lost them all.

== British Professional Championship finals ==
Year	Champion	Score	Runner-up	Prize money			Venue
Year	Champion	Score	Runner-up	Total	Champion	Runner-up	Venue
1981	(Scotland) Jocky Wilson	6–5	(England) John Lowe	£12,000	£6,000	£3,000	Fiesta Club Stockton-on-Tees
1982	(England) Eric Bristow	7–3	(England) John Lowe	£26,000	£7,000	£3,500	Gaskins club Middlesbrough
1983	(Scotland) Jocky Wilson	7–2	(England) Dave Whitcombe	£30,100	£8,000	?	Coatham Bowl Redcar
1984	(England) Mike Gregory	7–5	(England) John Lowe	£29,600	£8,000	£2,000	Coatham Bowl Redcar
1985	(England) Eric Bristow	7–4	(England) John Lowe	£34,000	£9,000	£4,500	Coatham Bowl Redcar
1986	(Scotland) Jocky Wilson	7–6	(England) Dave Whitcombe	£35,800	£10,000	£4,500	Coatham Bowl Redcar
1987	(England) Keith Deller	7–5	(Wales) Leighton Rees	£38,200	£10,000	£5,000	Coatham Bowl Redcar
1988	(Scotland) Jocky Wilson	7–2	(England) Ray Battye	£39,700	£11,000	£5,500	Coatham Bowl Redcar
