= Steve Brennan =

British darts player

Personal information
- Full name: Stephen Edward Brennan
- Born: 2 February 1951 (age 75) Leiston, Suffolk, England
- Home town: Knodishall, Suffolk, England

Sport
- Sport: Darts
- Playing since: 1971
- Darts: 22g Tungsten
- Laterality: Right-handed
- Walk-on music: "Sweet Caroline" by Neil Diamond

Organisation (see split in darts)
- BDO: 1980–1986
- WDF: 1980–1986

WDF major events – best performances
- World Championship: Quarter-final: 1982
- World Masters: Quarter-final: 1980, 1983, 1984

Other tournament wins
- Tournament: Years
- New Zealand Open: 1981

Stephen Edward Brennan (born 2 February 1951) is an English former professional darts player that represented Northern Ireland. He competed in the 1980s. He was a civil engineer from Leiston and began playing county darts for Suffolk in 1979–1980. He was eligible to play for Northern Ireland because his father was born in Londonderry.

== Darts career ==
He made his Embassy World Darts Championship debut in 1982 and caused one of the great upsets in darts history by beating defending champion Eric Bristow in the first round. He also knocked out Dave Whitcombe in the second round before losing 0–4 to Stefan Lord in the quarter-finals.

He appeared at the next four World Championships, but only won two more matches – both first round victories in 1984 and 1985. His last appearance came in 1986 when he lost in the first round to Paul Lim.

After another surprise victory for Brennan over Bristow in the 1986 MFI World Matchplay tournament, Bristow stated that he kept "losing to wallies". Bristow's rival Jocky Wilson said "there's only one wally, that's Eric Bristow and he's at home now".

== World Championship results ==
=== BDO ===
- 1981: Preliminary round: (lost to Wayne Lock 1–2) (sets)
- 1982: Quarter Finals: (lost to Stefan Lord 0–4)
- 1983: Last 32: (lost to Jocky Wilson 0–2)
- 1984: Last 16: (lost to Dave Whitcombe 1–4)
- 1985: Last 16: (lost to Alan Glazier 2–3)
- 1986: Last 32: (lost to Paul Lim 1–3)
