= Mike Gregory (darts player) =

English darts player (1956–2022)

Personal information
- Full name: Michael Seward Gregory
- Nickname: "The Quiet Man of Darts"
- Born: 16 December 1956 Bath, Somerset, England
- Died: 19 April 2022 (aged 65)

Sport
- Sport: Darts
- Playing since: 1976
- Darts: 22g Winmau Signature
- Laterality: Right handed
- Walk-on music: "The Combine Harvester" by The Wurzels

Organisation (see split in darts)
- BDO: 1983–1992, 1993–2005
- PDC: 1992–1993 (Founding Member)

WDF major events – best performances
- World Championship: Runner-up: 1992
- World Masters: Runner-up: 1983, 1992

Other tournament wins
- Years
Antwerp Open	1993
Australian Grand Masters	1986, 1992
BDO Gold Cup	1994
Belgium Open	1994, 1995
British Open	1991
Canadian Open	1991
Dry Blackthorn Cider Masters	1988
Finnish Open	1984, 1987
Norway Open	1994
Swedish Open	1989, 1992
Swiss Open	1995
Unipart European Masters	1995
WDC UK Masters	1992, 1993
Best Old Major results:
British Matchplay	1984
British Professional	1984
Butlins Grand Masters	1984
MFI World Matchplay	1986
News of the World Darts Championship	1987, 1988

Michael Seward Gregory (16 December 1956 – 19 April 2022) was an English professional darts player, best remembered as the runner-up to Phil Taylor in the 1992 Embassy World Darts Championship final, which went to a tiebreak final leg and is regarded as one of the greatest matches in darts history.

Gregory was also twice runner-up in the Winmau World Masters. Among his tournament wins were the News of the World Championship (1987 and 1988), the Butlins Grand Masters (1984), the MFI World Matchplay (1986), the WDF Europe Cup (1988), the WDC UK Masters (1992 and 1993) and the European Masters (1995). Gregory was also a controversial figure in the 1993 split in darts, first siding with the rebel World Darts Council players in leaving the British Darts Organisation, before rejoining the BDO.

== Darts career ==
Gregory was one of the top ranked players from the mid-1980s through to the early 1990s, having been seeded in the top four at the World Championships on seven occasions – although he never won the World title.

His major breakthrough was beating John Lowe in the semi-finals of the 1983 British Open in which he finished runner-up to Eric Bristow. He lost again to Bristow in the final of that year's World Masters tournament. He made his World Championship debut in 1984 and reached the quarter-final, losing heavily 0–5 to Jocky Wilson.

Gregory lost at the quarter-final stage of the World Championship in 1987, 1989 and 1993. He made his first semi-final in 1990, losing to Eric Bristow and his only final appearance came in 1992 – when he lost an epic match 5–6 in sets to Taylor. Having missed six darts for the title – two each for double 20, double 8 and double 10, which he has since jokingly referred to as the Bermuda Triangle – the match went all the way to a sudden death leg, which comes when the players reach 5–5 in both sets and legs. It was the first time this had happened in the World Championship's 14-year history and the match is often mentioned in discussions about the greatest darts match; Taylor himself listed this as his greatest ever match. Gregory won the bull-off to throw first in the decider, but had a bounce-out on his first turn and Taylor comfortably sealed the win. Gregory would become the only man to have lost a World Championship final having had darts at double to win, and remained so until Mark McGeeney did so in 2018.

Whilst he was never a World Champion, he won many televised titles of the era, including the 1984 Unipart British Professional (beating both Jocky Wilson and John Lowe), the 1986 MFI World Matchplay, as well as becoming one of only seven players to win the News of the World Darts Championship twice (in 1987 and 1988), joining Tom Barrett (1963–64 and 1964–65) and Eric Bristow (1983 and 1984) as the only other players to win it in consecutive years.

== Role in the BDO/WDC split ==
Gregory was a controversial figure in the split in darts, a dispute between the game's governing body, the British Darts Organisation, and the top players. Darts had boomed in the 1980s, with as many as 23 televised events in 1983, but this had steadily diminished to just one by 1989. This reduction in prizemoney and television exposure meant that players were no longer able to make a living from the sport. The top players, their managers and darts equipment manufacturers felt that the BDO were not doing enough to improve the image of darts and attract new sponsors, so they formed the World Darts Council, which eventually became the Professional Darts Corporation. By the end of 1992, the WDC had begun to stage their own tournaments outside the auspices of the BDO. The first of these, the Lada UK Masters, was shown on Anglia Television and was won by Gregory.

At the 1993 Embassy World Championship, the WDC players were ordered to remove their WDC insignia. Later in the tournament, 16 WDC players, including Gregory, issued a statement saying that they would only participate in the 1994 World Championship if it came under the auspices of the WDC, and that they only recognised the WDC as having the authority to sanction their participation in darts tournaments worldwide. The BDO responded by banning the 16 "rebel" WDC players, and any other players or officials who associated with them, from all competitions. This was endorsed at a World Darts Federation meeting in October 1993 and became a worldwide ban. This resulted in four years of litigation, as the WDC sought to overturn the ban.

Gregory won the second WDC Lada UK Masters in November 1993, defeating Bob Anderson in the final. However, Gregory then had a change of heart, and announced in late November 1993 that he would be returning to the BDO. He was the second WDC player to move back to the BDO, after Chris Johns. The other WDC players were particularly aggrieved by Gregory's departure, as they felt he had let them down at a crucial juncture. He had also not informed them in advance. Coming just a month before the inaugural WDC World Darts Championship was set to begin, Gregory's defection threatened their recent broadcast deal with Sky Sports, as the contract stipulated that all WDC players were to participate in the tournament. Ultimately, Sky agreed to honour the deal, on condition that no other players withdrew.

In an interview on Time of our Lives, Gregory admitted that in hindsight he made a mistake in leaving the WDC. Eric Bristow wrote in his autobiography: "Mike's decision to leave hurt us badly because he was a good player and the good players really did need to show solidarity. When he defected back to the BDO we were down to fourteen and panic was setting in." Bristow, who had been good friends with Gregory, insisted that he would never speak to him again. John Lowe felt that Gregory had succumbed to pressure from Olly Croft, who warned that he would lose his house if the WDC lost its case. John Gwynne said: I think even he [Mike] would admit that it's the worst thing he ever did, because he was accepted then by neither side." When Phil Taylor won the inaugural Champions League of Darts in 2016, his first win broadcast on BBC since his 1992 Embassy world final victory over Gregory, he said: "I'm sure he's watching so, to Mike, look at what you could have won, buddy!"

== After the split ==
The last BDO tournament in which the "rebel" players competed was the Finland Open in April 1993. Gregory's return to the BDO was in time for the 1994 British Open, which was staged on New Year's Day, and he reached the semi-finals. He was not able to compete at the Embassy World Darts Championship in 1994, as the tournament draw had been made before he decided to return to the BDO. Later in 1994, he won the Norway Open and Belgian Open.

In 1995, he returned to the Lakeside for the first time since the split as the number five seed. He reached the quarter-finals, losing 3–4 to Martin Adams.

His other WDF titles came in 1995, winning the Swiss Open and the Belgian Open. Gregory then won his last televised title in September 1995, when he won the Unipart European Masters tournament, which was held at Lakeside and broadcast on the BBC. In the semi-final, Gregory defeated the reigning BDO World Champion, Richie Burnett, and beat Peter Manley in the final.

After Gregory's Unipart European Masters triumph, his form quickly faded. He suffered first round defeats in each of his next three appearances in the BDO World Championship at Lakeside – in 1996, 1997 and 1999, and did not qualify for the competition again. Other than a quarter-final appearance at the 2001 Welsh Open and a defeat to Davy Richardson in the final of the 2003 Scottish Open, he did not feature in the latter stages of Open events after 1999. His last appearance at a major WDF event was the 2005 Scottish Open, when he reached the last 16.

Gregory played county darts for Somerset and also played for Radstock in the Somerset Super League, where he appeared with the PDC player Steve Grubb.

== Death ==
Mike Gregory died on 19 April 2022, at the age of 65. He had been battling dementia in the last few years.

== World Championship results ==
=== BDO ===
- 1984: Quarter Finals (lost to Jocky Wilson 0–5) (sets)
- 1985: 1st Round (lost to Bobby George 1–2)
- 1986: 1st Round (lost to Keith Deller 0–3)
- 1987: Quarter Finals (lost to Jocky Wilson 3–4)
- 1988: 1st Round (lost to Chris Johns 0–3)
- 1989: Quarter Finals (lost to Jocky Wilson 3–4)
- 1990: Semi Finals (lost to Eric Bristow 2–5)
- 1991: 2nd Round (lost to Eric Bristow 0–3)
- 1992: Runner Up (lost to Phil Taylor 5–6)
- 1993: Quarter Finals (lost to Bobby George 2–4)
- 1995: Quarter Finals (lost to Martin Adams 3–4)
- 1996: 1st Round (lost to Les Wallace 0–3)
- 1997: 1st Round (lost to Roland Scholten 2–3)
- 1999: 1st Round (lost to Martin Adams 1–3)

== Career finals ==
=== BDO major finals: 7 (4 titles) ===
Legend
World Championship (0–1)
World Masters (0–2)
British Professional (1–0)
World Matchplay (1–0)
Grand Masters (1–0)
British Matchplay (1–0)

Outcome	No.	Year	Championship	Opponent in the final	Score (Note: (l) = score in legs, (s) = score in sets.)
Runner-up	1.	1983	Winmau World Masters	(England) Eric Bristow	1–2 (s)
Winner	1.	1984	British Matchplay	(England) Keith Deller	3–2 (s)
Winner	2.	1984	British Professional Championship	(England) John Lowe	7–5 (s)
Winner	3.	1984	Butlins Grand Masters	(England) Bob Anderson	5–3 (l)
Winner	4.	1986	MFI World Matchplay	(England) Jocky Wilson	5–1 (s)
Runner-up	2.	1992	World Darts Championship	(England) Phil Taylor	5–6 (s)
Runner-up	3.	1992	Winmau World Masters	(England) Dennis Priestley	2–3 (s)

=== WDF major finals: 1 (1 title) ===
Legend
Europe Cup (1–0)

Outcome	No.	Year	Championship	Opponent in the final	Score
Winner	1.	1988	Europe Cup Singles	(Scotland) Trevor Nurse	4–0 (l)

=== Independent major finals: 2 (2 titles) ===
Outcome	No.	Year	Championship	Opponent in the final	Score
Winner	1.	1987	News of the World Championship (1)	(England) Peter Evison	2–0 (l)
Winner	2.	1988	News of the World Championship (2)	(England) Kevin Spiolek	2–1 (l)

== Performance timeline ==
CF= County Finals, DF= Divisional Finals

Tournament	1980	1981	1982	1983	1984	1985	1986	1987	1988	1989	1990	1991	1992	1993	1994	1995	1996	1997	1998	1999	2000
BDO World Championship	Did not qualify				QF	1R	1R	QF	1R	QF	SF	2R	F	QF	DNQ	QF	1R	1R	DNQ	1R	DNQ
Winmau World Masters	2R	DNQ		F	3R	QF	3R	QF	SF	QF	QF	4R	F	DNP	4R	QF	3R	2R	DNQ	3R	1R
British Matchplay	Did not play				W	QF	DNP	QF	DNP	SF	SF	DNP					QF	DNP		NH	
British Professional	NH	Did not qualify			W	QF	QF	2R	2R	Not held											
Butlins Grand Masters	Did not qualify				W	QF	QF	Not held													
MFI World Matchplay	Not held				1R	QF	W	SF	QF	Not held											
European Masters	Not held															W	Not held				
News of the World	???			QF	QF	CF	1R	W	W	DF	???	Not held						???	Not held		

WDF majors performances
Tournament	Event	Euro Cup 1988
WDF World Cup & WDF Europe Cup	Singles	W
WDF World Cup & WDF Europe Cup	Pairs	QF
WDF World Cup & WDF Europe Cup	Team	SF
WDF World Cup & WDF Europe Cup	Overall	W

Performance Table Legend
W	Won the tournament	F	Finalist	SF	Semifinalist	QF	Quarterfinalist	#R; RR; L#	Lost in # round Round-robin; Last # stage	DQ	Disqualified
DNQ	Did not qualify	DNP	Did not participate	WD	Withdrew	NH	Tournament not held	#R; RR; L#	Lost in # round Round-robin; Last # stage	NYF	Not yet founded
