= Alan Glazier =

English darts player (1939–2020)

Personal information
- Full name: Alan James Glazier
- Nickname: "The Ton Machine"
- Born: 21 January 1939 Hampton, London, England
- Died: 12 November 2020 (aged 81)
- Home town: Hayes, Hillingdon, England

Sport
- Sport: Darts
- Playing since: 1961
- Darts: 21 Gram
- Laterality: Left-handed
- Walk-on music: "I Go Wild" by The Rolling Stones

Organisation (see split in darts)
- BDO: 1975–1989, 1994–1997

WDF major events – best performances
- World Championship: Semi Finals: 1986
- World Masters: Last 32: 1986, 1989

Other tournament wins
- Tournament: Years
- North American Open Swedish Open: 1977; 1978

Alan James Glazier (21 January 1939 – 12 November 2020) was an English professional darts player. He used the nickname "The Ton Machine" and was noted for his all-black outfits.

== Career ==
Glazier was one of the first darts players who turned professional in an attempt to make a full-time living from the game of darts as it grew in popularity during the 1970s. He was one of the players who appeared in the very first World Professional Darts Championship in 1978, losing to Alan Evans in the first round. In 1979, he reached the quarter-finals at the World Championship before being beaten by Tony Brown. Glazier then had a disappointing run as he went out in the first round of the World Championship in 1980, 1982 and 1983, and did not make it to the 1981 Championships.

His best run at the World Championships came in 1985, losing a quarter-final to Eric Bristow, and in 1986, when he reached the semi-finals for the only time, again falling to Bristow. Glazier's last appearance at the Lakeside Country Club was in 1987, when he lost in the first round to Richie Gardner.

Outside of the World Championship, Glazier managed to reach the final of the News of the World Darts Championship in 1979 and won the Swedish Open in 1978.

Glazier appeared on the UK television show Bullseye 15 times as one of the professionals and he represented England 27 times between the years 1974–1988.

Glazier quit the BDO in 1997. He went on to sell and distribute his own darts of the same design as the ones he used as a professional. These were originally manufactured by Winmau Darts but more recently are made by McKicks Darts.

Glazier died on 12 November 2020 at the age of 81 from post COVID-19 complications.

== World Championship results ==
=== BDO ===
- 1978: 1st Round (lost to Alan Evans 4–6) (legs)
- 1979: Quarter Finals (lost to Tony Brown 2–3) (sets)
- 1980: 1st Round (lost to Tony Clark 0–2)
- 1982: 1st Round (lost to Bobby George 1–2)
- 1983: 1st Round (lost to Jerry Umberger 0–2)
- 1984: 2nd Round (lost to Jocky Wilson 0–4)
- 1985: Quarter Finals (lost to Eric Bristow 0–4)
- 1986: Semi Finals (lost to Eric Bristow 3–5)
- 1987: 1st Round (lost to Ritchie Gardner 0–3)

== Career finals ==
=== BDO major finals: 1 (1 runner-up) ===
Outcome	No.	Year	Championship	Opponent in the final	Score (Note: (l) = score in legs, (s) = score in sets.)
Runner-up	1.	1976	British Matchplay	(England) Bill Lennard	3–4 (s)

=== Independent major finals: 1 (1 runner-up) ===
Outcome	No.	Year	Championship	Opponent in the final	Score (Note: (l) = score in legs, (s) = score in sets.)
Runner-up	1.	1979	News of the World Championship	(England) Bobby George	0–2 (l)

== Performance timeline ==
Tournament	1976	1977	1978	1979	1980	1981	1982	1983	1984	1985	1986	1987	1988	1989	1990	1991	1992	1993	1994	1995	1996	1997
BDO World Championship	Not held		1R	QF	1R	DNQ	1R	1R	2R	QF	SF	1R	Did not participate									
Winmau World Masters	DNP		2R	2R	Did not participate						3R	DNP		3R	Did not participate				1R	DNP		RR
British Matchplay	F	QF	Did not play																			
British Professional	Not held					2R	SF	1R	2R	1R	2R	1R	DNP	Not held								
Butlins Grand Masters	NH	Did not play					QF	Did not play			QF	Not held										
News of the World	???			F	???											Not held						DNP

Performance Table Legend
DNP	Did not play at the event	DNQ	Did not qualify for the event	NYF	Not yet founded	#R	lost in the early rounds of the tournament (WR = Wildcard round, RR = Round robin)
QF	lost in the quarter-finals	SF	lost in the semi-finals	F	lost in the final	W	won the tournament
