= Dave Lee (darts player) =

English darts player

Personal information
- Home town: England

Sport
- Sport: Darts
- Playing since: 1976
- Darts: 19 Gram
- Laterality: Right-handed

Organisation (see split in darts)
- BDO: 1978–1996

WDF major events – best performances
- World Championship: Last 16: 1983, 1986, 1987
- World Masters: Semi-final: 1983

Other tournament wins
- Tournament: Years
- Double Diamond Masters News of the World: 1984 1985

David Lee is an English former professional darts player who competed in British Darts Organisation (BDO) events in the 1970s, 1980s and 1990s.

== Career ==
Lee made his World Professional Darts Championship debut in 1983, defeating Canada's Tony Holyoake in the first round before losing in the second round to Eric Bristow. After a first round exit in 1985, Lee made it to the second round in 1986 and 1987. Lee made a total of four appearances in the World Championship but never made it to the quarter-finals. Lee also played in the Winmau World Masters five times with his best run coming in 1983, reaching the semi-finals with notable wins over then World Champion Keith Deller and Bob Anderson, eventually losing to Mike Gregory. He also reached the quarter-finals in the 1984 World Masters, losing to Deller who managed to avenge his defeat to Lee 12 months before.

Lee won two unranked tournaments in his career, the 1984 Double Diamond Masters, beating Bob Anderson in the final and the prestigious News of the World Darts Championship in 1985. He was a quarter finalist in numerous events such as the MFI World Matchplay in 1984 and 1985, the Butlins Grand Masters in 1985, the British Matchplay in 1986 and the Dry Blackthorn Cider Masters in 1987. He also reached the semi-finals of the 1988 British Open.

Following a first round exit in the 1989 Winmau World Masters to Steve Gittins, Lee failed to qualify for any of the major tournaments and faded from the darts scene completely following the split in darts.

Lee quit the BDO in 1996.

== Personal life ==
Lee's wife Sandra also played darts professionally, for Wales.

== World Championship results ==
=== BDO ===
- 1983: 2nd round (lost to Eric Bristow 2–3)
- 1985: 1st round (lost to Luc Marreel 1–2)
- 1986: 2nd round (lost to Terry O'Dea 0–3)
- 1987: 2nd round (lost to John Lowe 1–3)

== Career finals ==
=== Independent major finals: 1 (1 title) ===
Outcome	No.	Year	Championship	Opponent in the final	Score
Winner	1.	1985	News of the World Championship	(England) Billy Dunbar	2–0 (l)
