= Cliff Lazarenko =

English darts player (born 1952)

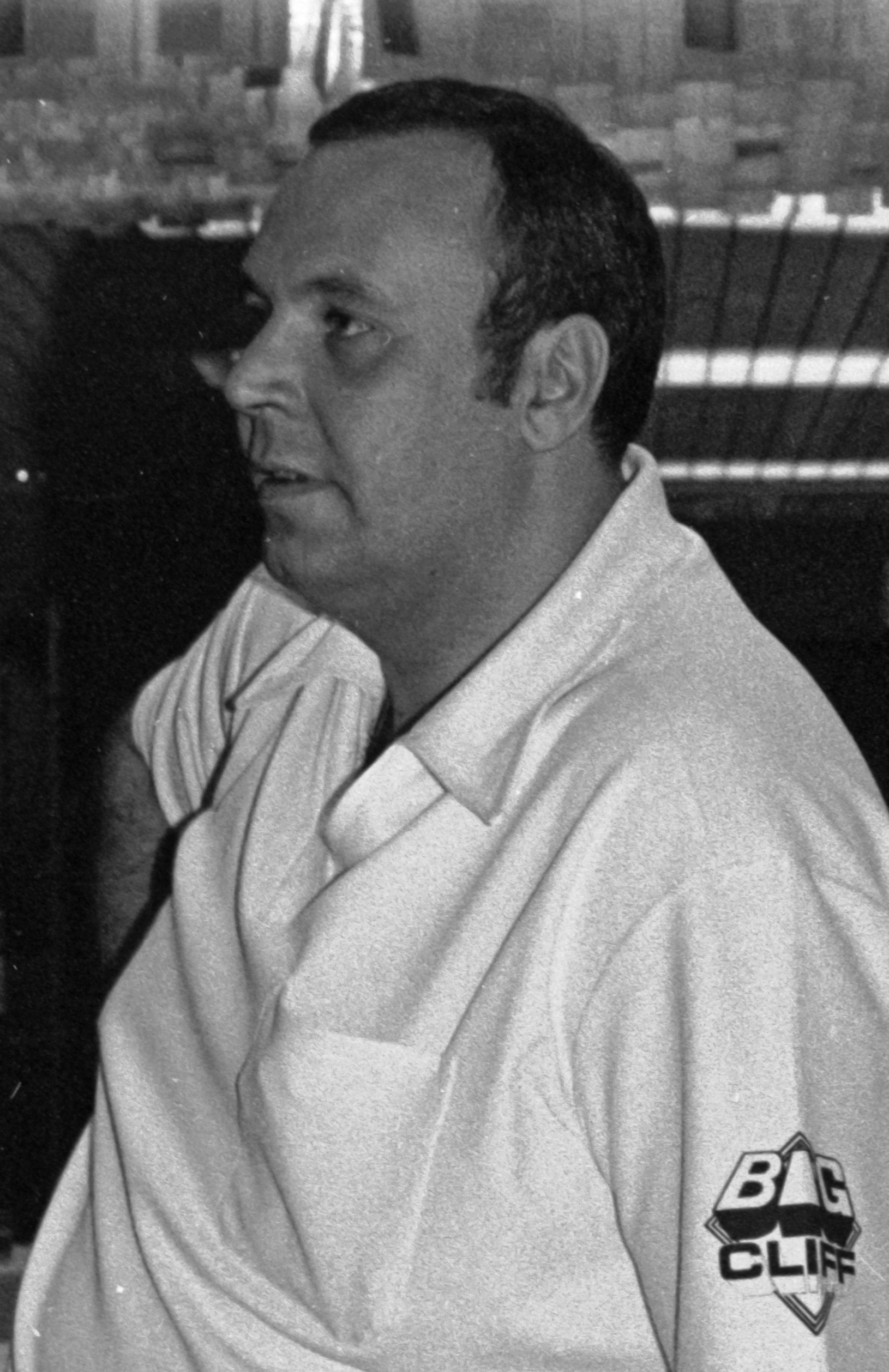
- Lazarenko in 1985

Personal information
- Nickname: "Big Cliff"
- Born: 16 March 1952 (age 74) Liss, Hampshire, England
- Home town: Wellingborough, England

Sport
- Sport: Darts
- Playing since: 1970s
- Darts: 20g Golden Unicorn Darts
- Laterality: Right-handed
- Walk-on music: "Hey! Baby" by DJ Otzi

Organisation (see split in darts)
- BDO: 1977–1993
- PDC: 1993–2007 (founding member)

WDF major events – best performances
- World Championship: Third Place: 1981
- World Masters: Third Place: 1978

PDC premier events – best performances
- World Championship: Quarter-final: 1999
- World Matchplay: Semi-final: 1995
- World Grand Prix: Last 32: 2001, 2002
- UK Open: Last 16: 2003

Other tournament wins
- Tournament: Years
- British Matchplay British Open Denmark Open Flowers Dartsathlon WDF Euro Cup Pairs WDF World Cup Pairs Autumn Gold Cider Masters BDO Gold Cup: 1979; 1980, 1984; 1981, 1983; 1982,1983,1985,1986; 1984; 1981; 1984, 1986 1984

Cliff Lazarenko (born 16 March 1952) is an English former professional darts player. Nicknamed "Big Cliff" due to his height (193 cm / 6'4") and weight (over 127 kg at his peak), he is known for being a colourful character on and off the stage.

== Early life ==
Lazarenko was born in Liss, Hampshire, growing up in Greatham, where his parents ran a garage. He honed his darts skills in his local pub, The Queen. He later moved to Wellingborough. Before becoming a professional darts player in 1975, he worked as a builders labourer.

== Darts career ==
Lazarenko first appeared in a televised match on the show Indoor League in the 1970s. He went on to win several singles and pairs titles. He won the British Open in 1980, winning it again later in the decade, and reached the semi-finals of the BDO World Darts Championship four times. In 1980, he lost out to Bobby George; the next year he gained revenge on George by beating him in the quarter-finals, eventually losing to world champion Eric Bristow. In 1985, he reached the semi-finals again, this time without losing a single set en route, winning the opening round against Singapore's Paul Lim (2–0), the second round against the Swede Stefan Lord (3–0), and the quarter-finals against Northern Irish player Fred McMullan (4–0), but was narrowly defeated in the semi-finals by fellow Englishman John Lowe 5–3. He reached the semis again in 1990, but once again fell short of the final, losing 5–0 to eventual winner Phil Taylor.

Big Cliff made a habit of winning the Dartsathlon (an event made up of having 15 darts at various doubles, trebles, Bullseyes, 25s, and 501 legs) in the early–mid 80s, winning the event four times in 1982, 1983, 1985, and 1986. He also won the Autumn Gold Masters in 1984 and 1986, the British Matchplay in 1979, British Gold Cup in 1984, Jersey Open in 1982 and 1983, and the Danish Open in 1981 and 1983. He came to the fore, however, with his 1977 win in the Marlboro Masters.

Lazarenko was one of the sixteen players who defected from the BDO to form the PDC. Although he managed to maintain his popularity with the fans, he never managed to repeat his performances in the PDC World Darts Championship, with several first-round exits to his name, and only managing a quarter-final at best in 1999. In other PDC tournaments, however, Lazarenko showed great promise: he reached the semi-finals of the 1995 World Matchplay, beating Dennis Smith, Shayne Burgess, and Nigel Justice along the way, before losing to Dennis Priestley. He was also a Matchplay quarter-finalist in 2001.

In the mid-2000s, Lazarenko suffered from ill health, losing a lot of weight, and ceased competing in darts tournaments. However, in the 2007 UK Open at the Reebok Stadium in Bolton, Lazarenko made a return to the big stage, and won two matches in one night, en route to the second round. He then won another game the next night, before falling in the third round. In 2008 it was announced that Lazarenko would compete in the BetFred League of Legends along with players including Bristow, Lowe, George, and Bob Anderson. Lazarenko reached the semi-finals of the tournament, losing to Keith Deller.

== In popular culture ==
In the 1981 film An American Werewolf in London, a darts match between Rab Smith and Lazarenko is featured on TV in the flat of the character played by Jenny Agutter.

== World Championship performances ==
=== BDO ===
- 1979: First round (lost to Terry O'Dea)
- 1980: Semi-final (lost to Bobby George)
- 1981: Third place (beat Tony Brown, lost to Eric Bristow in semi-finals)
- 1982: Second round (lost to Nicky Virachkul)
- 1983: Quarter-final (lost to Jocky Wilson)
- 1984: First round (lost to Ceri Morgan)
- 1985: Semi-final (lost to John Lowe)
- 1986: First round (lost to Dave Lee)
- 1987: Quarter-final (lost to John Lowe)
- 1988: Second round (lost to Paul Reynolds)
- 1989: First round (lost to Wayne Weening)
- 1990: Semi-final (lost to Phil Taylor)
- 1991: Second round (lost to Dave Whitcombe)

=== PDC ===
- 1994: Group stage (lost both group games to Alan Warriner and Richie Gardner)
- 1995: Group stage (beat Graeme Stoddart but lost to Peter Evison)
- 1996: Group stage (lost both group games to Shayne Burgess and Phil Taylor)
- 1997: Group stage (lost both group games to Peter Evison and Steve Raw)
- 1999: Quarter-final (lost to Shayne Burgess)
- 2000: First round (lost to Dennis Smith)
- 2001: Second round (lost to Roland Scholten)
- 2002: First round (lost to Roland Scholten)
- 2003: First round (lost to John Part)
- 2004: Second round (lost to Steve Maish)

== Career finals ==
=== BDO major finals: 6 (1 title) ===
Legend
World Matchplay (0–1)
Grand Masters (0–1)
British Matchplay (1–3)

Outcome	No.	Year	Championship	Opponent in the final	Score (Note: (l) = score in legs, (s) = score in sets.)
Winner	1.	1979	British Matchplay	(England) Tony Brown	2–0 (s)
Runner-up	1.	1981	British Matchplay	(Scotland) Jocky Wilson	0–2 (s)
Runner-up	2.	1982	Butlins Grand Masters	(England) Eric Bristow	3–4 (l)
Runner-up	3.	1984	MFI World Matchplay	(England) John Lowe	3–5 (s)
Runner-up	4.	1985	British Matchplay	(England) John Lowe	0–3 (s)
Runner-up	5.	1989	British Matchplay	(England) Bob Anderson	0–3 (s)

=== WDF major finals: 2 ===
Legend
World Cup (0–1)
Europe Cup (0–1)

Outcome	No.	Year	Championship	Opponent in the final	Score
Runner-up	1.	1977	World Cup Singles	(Wales) Leighton Rees	3–4 (l)
Runner-up	2.	1986	Europe Cup Singles	(England) John Lowe	2–4 (l)

== Performance timeline ==
Lazarenko's performance timeline is as follows:

BDO

Tournament	1977	1978	1979	1980	1981	1982	1983	1984	1985	1986	1987	1988	1989	1990	1991
BDO World Championship	NYF	DNQ	1R	SF	SF	2R	QF	1R	SF	1R	QF	2R	1R	SF	2R
World Masters	1R	SF	2R	3R	QF	QF	2R	2R	3R	3R	QF	1R	4R	2R	DNP
British Matchplay	QF	QF	W	QF	F	SF	SF	SF	F	SF	SF	?	F	DNP	
British Professional	Not held				2R	QF	QF	QF	QF	2R	1R	1R	Not held		
Butlins Grand Masters	DNP			QF	SF	F	SF	QF	SF	SF	Not held				
MFI World Matchplay	Not held							F	SF	QF	QF	1R	Not held		

WDF majors performances
Tournament	Event	World Cup 1977	Euro Cup 1978	World Cup 1979	Euro Cup 1980	World Cup 1981	Euro Cup 1982	World Cup 1983	Euro Cup 1984	World Cup 1985	Euro Cup 1986	World Cup 1987
WDF World Cup & WDF Europe Cup	Singles	RU	L16	DNP	L32	L32	SF	DNP	L16	L16	RU	L64
WDF World Cup & WDF Europe Cup	Pairs	QF	RU	DNP	SF	W	SF	DNP	W	Prelim.	SF	L32
WDF World Cup & WDF Europe Cup	Team	RU	SF	DNP	W	W	W	DNP	W	SF	W	W
WDF World Cup & WDF Europe Cup	Overall	RU	W	DNP	W	W	W	DNP	W	W	W	W

PDC

Tournament	1994	1995	1996	1997	1998	1999	2000	2001	2002	2003	2004	2005	2006	2007
PDC World Championship	RR	RR	RR	RR	DNQ	QF	1R	2R	1R	1R	2R	Did not qualify		
World Matchplay	1R	SF	2R	1R	1R	1R	DNQ	QF	2R	1R	Did not qualify			
World Grand Prix	Not held				Did not qualify			1R	1R	Did not qualify				
UK Open	Not held									5R	4R	5R	1R	3R

Performance Table Legend
W	Won the tournament	F	Finalist	SF	Semifinalist	QF	Quarterfinalist	#R; RR; L#	Lost in # round Round-robin; Last # stage	DQ	Disqualified
DNQ	Did not qualify	DNP	Did not participate	WD	Withdrew	NH	Tournament not held	#R; RR; L#	Lost in # round Round-robin; Last # stage	NYF	Not yet founded
