= Dave Whitcombe =

English darts player (born 1954)

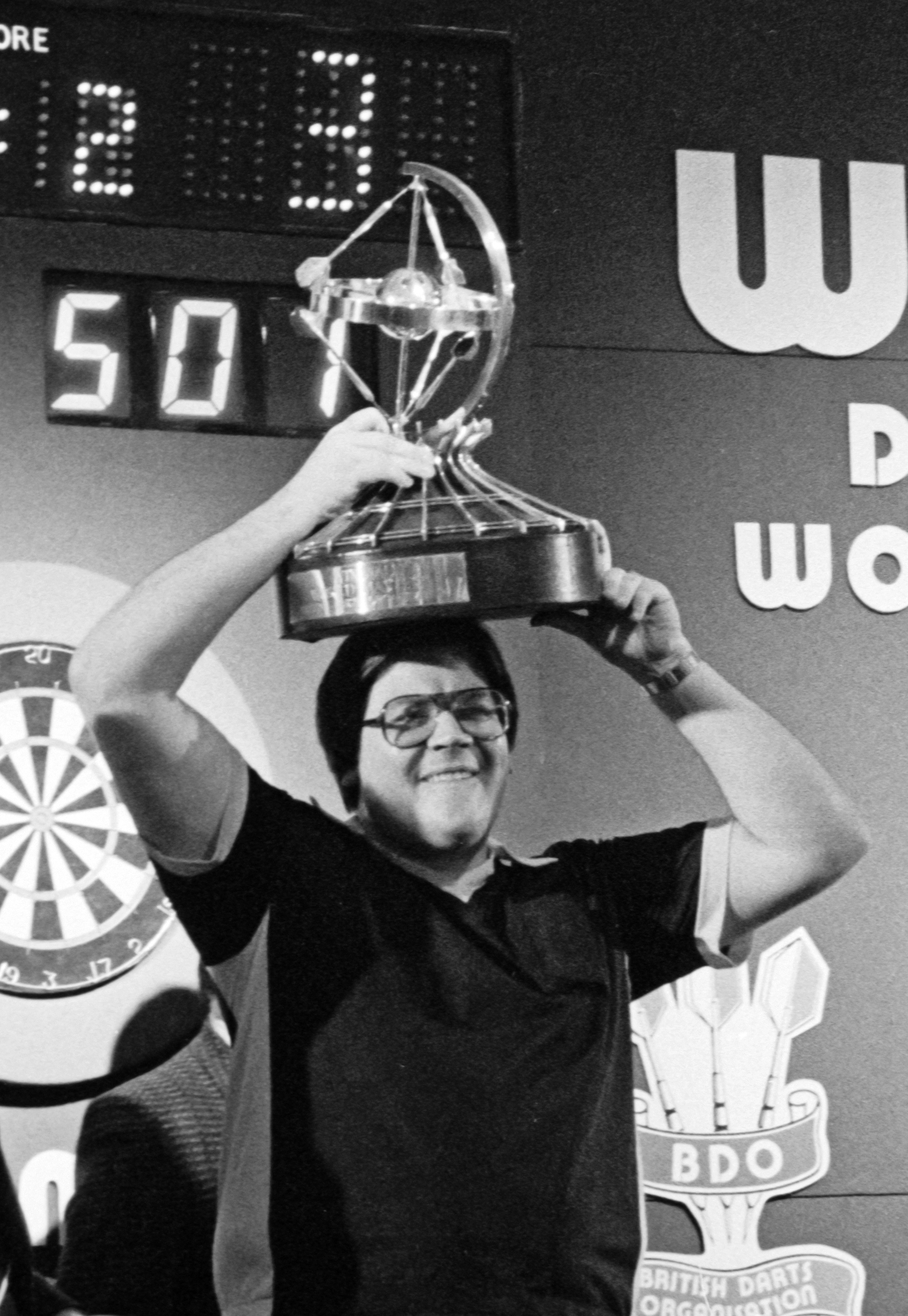
- Whitcombe in 1985

Personal information
- Full name: David Whitcombe
- Nickname: "The Man with No Nickname"
- Born: 27 June 1954 (age 72) Chatham, Kent, England
- Home town: Sittingbourne, Kent, England

Sport
- Sport: Darts
- Darts: 22g Signature
- Laterality: Right-handed
- Walk-on music: "Can You Feel the Force?" by The Real Thing

Organisation (see split in darts)
- BDO: 1978–1992
- PDC: 2004–2007

WDF major events – best performances
- World Championship: Runner-up: 1984, 1986
- World Masters: Winner (2): 1982, 1985

PDC premier events – best performances
- World Championship: Last 64: 2006

Other tournament wins
- Tournament: Years
- Finnish Open Swedish Open British Matchplay News of the World Ch'ship: 1985; 1985, 1987, 1990; 1987 1989
- Updated on 7 December 2007

David Whitcombe (born 27 June 1954) is an English former professional darts player who won several major tournaments, he was twice a winner of the Winmau World Masters (1982 and 1985) and lost to Eric Bristow in two World Championship finals in 1984 and 1986.

== Early life ==
Whitcombe was born on 27 June 1954 in Chatham, Kent. After leaving school at age 15, he worked as an apprentice electrician at Chatham Dockyard, often playing darts during lunchtime. He joined a local team, and in his first season, won the league singles tournament. At age 20, he was selected to play for Kent, and in 1975, he quit his job to concentrate on entering darts tournaments.

== Darts career ==
He made his debut in the 1978 BDO World Darts Championship. He won the News of the World Darts Championship in 1989, the British Matchplay, the Swedish Open three times, the Finland Open, the Marlboro Masters and Dunlop Masters tournaments. He was also a prolific county and holiday camp open winner.

He played for and captained Kent in the inter counties league, winning the BDO (Darts World Magazine Sponsored) Tons Trophy and individual averages. In one season, he managed to win all nine man of the match awards (five consecutively), beating nine England International players in the process, earning him an England call-up in 1981.

His overall World Championship record also included three quarter-final appearances in 1983, 1989, 1991, and the semi-finals in 1985. Bristow must be considered as Whitcombe's nemesis at the World Championship. In his 13 appearances at the championships, Whitcombe met Bristow six times and lost every time, including a quarter-final in 1991 where Whitcombe lost 3–4, having been three sets and two legs up at one stage. In other Major championships like the British Matchplay and the World Masters, Whitcombe defeated Bristow in both the semi and finals. Whitcombe defeated Phil Taylor in the first round of the 1988 British Professional, which was Taylor's first televised appearance, but lost in two finals, both to Jocky Wilson.

Whitcombe helped form the players' association WPDPA (World Professional Dart Players' Association) with John Lowe, Cliff Lazarenko, and Tony Brown. The association was set up with the intention of promoting more televised tournaments after the big slump of televised darts in 1989 and the early 1990s. Eventually this organisation linked up with the newly formed World Darts Council in 1992, and darts was soon split into two organisations.

Whitcombe never actually joined the PDC darts circuit at its outset – choosing instead to virtually retire from the sport in 1992. He made a comeback in 2004 – rejoining the PDPA and the PDC circuit. In his comeback later, he qualified for the 2006 PDC World Championship, losing to Roland Scholten in the first round.

In May 2008, Whitcombe took part in the BetFred League of Legends which was shown live on Setanta Sports, playing along with Bristow, Lowe, Lazarenko, Bobby George, Peter Evison, Keith Deller, and the eventual winner Bob Anderson. Whitcombe led the league after the first 4 weeks and was the standout player of the league at that time. Whitcombe's form slumped in the following league weeks, but he still looked on course to reach the semi-finals as he was in second place after week five and in third place after week six. On the final league night on week seven, due to his own loss to Deller and the match between Evison and Lazarenko ending in a draw, Whitcombe dropped to fifth and failed to reach the semi-final stage.

== World Championship results ==
=== BDO ===
- 1980: Second Round (lost to Bobby George 0–2) (sets)
- 1981: Second Round (lost to Eric Bristow 0–2)
- 1982: Second Round (lost to Steve Brennan 0–2)
- 1983: Quarter-final (lost to Eric Bristow 3–4)
- 1984: Final (lost to Eric Bristow 1–7)
- 1985: Semi-final (lost to Eric Bristow 2–5)
- 1986: Final (lost to Eric Bristow 0–6)
- 1987: First Round (lost to Bob Sinnaeve 2–3)
- 1988: First round (lost to Peter Evison 1–3)
- 1989: Quarter-final (lost to Bob Anderson 3–4)
- 1990: First Round (lost to Chris Whiting 2–3)
- 1991: Quarter-finals (lost to Eric Bristow 3–4)
- 1992: First Round (lost to Per Skau 1–3)

=== PDC ===
- 2006: First Round (lost to Roland Scholten 1–3)

== Career finals ==
=== BDO ===
Whitcombe appeared in BDO major finals 9 times with a record of 3 wins and 6 runners-up.

Legend
World Championship (0–2)
World Masters (2–0)
British Professional (0–2)
British Matchplay (1–2)

Outcome	No.	Year	Championship	Opponent in the final	Score (Note: (l) = score in legs, (s) = score in sets.)
Winner	1.	1982	Winmau World Masters (1)	(England) Jocky Wilson	2–1 (s)
Runner-up	1.	1982	British Matchplay	(England) Eric Bristow	0–2 (s)
Runner-up	2.	1983	British Professional Championship	(England) Jocky Wilson	2–7 (s)
Runner-up	3.	1984	World Darts Championship	(England) Eric Bristow	1–7 (s)
Winner	2.	1985	Winmau World Masters (2)	(England) Ray Farrell	3–0 (s)
Runner-up	4.	1986	World Darts Championship	(England) Eric Bristow	0–6 (s)
Runner-up	5.	1986	British Matchplay	(England) Eric Bristow	1–3 (s)
Runner-up	6.	1986	British Professional Championship	(England) Jocky Wilson	6–7 (s)
Winner	3.	1987	British Matchplay	(England) Eric Bristow	3–0 (s)

=== Independent major finals: 2 (1 title) ===
Outcome	No.	Year	Championship	Opponent in the final	Score
Runner-up	1.	1980	News of the World Championship	(Sweden) Stefan Lord	0–2 (l)
Winner	1.	1989	News of the World Championship	(England) Dennis Priestley	2–1 (l)

== Performance timeline ==
Tournament	1979	1980	1981	1982	1983	1984	1985	1986	1987	1988	1989	1990	1991	1992	1993–2005	2006	2007	2008	2009	2010
BDO World Championship	DNP	L16	L16	L16	QF	RU	SF	RU	L32	L32	QF	L32	QF	L32	DNP					
Winmau World Masters	L16	QF	SF	W	L64	L32	W	QF	L32	L32	QF	L16	QF	DNP					L136	L72
British Matchplay	Did not play			RU	QF	QF	QF	RU	W	QF	QF	Did not play			Not held					
British Professional	Not held		SF	QF	RU	QF	SF	RU	L16	SF	Not held									
Butlins Grand Masters	DNP	SF	L16	QF	SF	QF	QF	L16	Not held											
MFI World Matchplay	Not held					SF	L16	L16	L16	L16	Not held									
PDC World Championship	Not yet founded															L64	DNP			
News of the World Darts Championship	???	RU	???				L16	???			W	???	Not held							

WDF majors performances
Tournament	Event	Euro Cup 1982	World Cup 1983	Euro Cup 1984	World Cup 1985	Euro Cup 1986
WDF World Cup & WDF Europe Cup	Singles	SF	SF	QF	DNP	SF
WDF World Cup & WDF Europe Cup	Pairs	L16	QF	W	DNP	SF
WDF World Cup & WDF Europe Cup	Team	W	W	W	DNP	W
WDF World Cup & WDF Europe Cup	Overall	W	W	W	DNP	W

Performance Table Legend
W	Won the tournament	F	Finalist	SF	Semifinalist	QF	Quarterfinalist	#R; RR; L#	Lost in # round Round-robin; Last # stage	DQ	Disqualified
DNQ	Did not qualify	DNP	Did not participate	WD	Withdrew	NH	Tournament not held	#R; RR; L#	Lost in # round Round-robin; Last # stage	NYF	Not yet founded
