= News of the World Darts Championship draws 1983–1997 =

Former English darts competition

News of the World Championship
- Founded: 1927
- Folded: 1997
- Country: England
- Venue: Various venues in London
- Last champions: (England) Phil Taylor (England) Linda Jones (1996–97)
- Tournament format: Legs

The News of the World Darts Championship was one among many televised darts events in 1983. Eric Bristow had failed to qualify for the final stage several times before finally winning the title in 1983. All players needed to win through in county and regional stages of the competition to reach the final stages, which had been first televised in 1972. TV coverage ceased after the 1988 competition and the event was discontinued in 1990. The event was revived for one year in 1997 and was shown on Sky Sports. Matches were short, with just two legs being required for victory. The oche was slightly longer than most tournaments, being a full 8 feet from the board to the toe line. From 1978 until 1988 the event was held at Wembley Arena, Wembley, London. From 1989–90 it was held at Docklands Arena, London and in 1997 it was held at Villa Park, Birmingham.

== See also ==
- News of the World Darts Championship draws 1972-1982

== 1983 Final stages ==
First round
(England) Eric Bristow	Bye
(England) Tim Gould	Bye
(England) Kevin Kenny	Bye
(Scotland) Chris Angel	Bye
(England) David Hobson	Bye
(England) Ralph Flatt	2
(England) Alan Blewitt	0
(Wales) Tony Clark	2
(United States) Tom Dorgan	1
(England) Mike Gregory	2
(Republic of Ireland) John Joe O'Shea	0

Quarterfinals
(England) Eric Bristow	2
(England) Tim Gould	0
(England) Kevin Kenny	2
(Scotland) Chris Angel	0
(England) David Hobson	0
(England) Ralph Flatt	2
(Wales) Tony Clark	2
(England) Mike Gregory	0

Semifinals
(England) Eric Bristow	2
(England) Kevin Kenny	0
(England) Ralph Flatt	2
(Wales) Tony Clark	1

Final
(England) Eric Bristow	2
(England) Ralph Flatt	0

== 1984 Final stages ==
John Lowe lost in the final of the Midland Counties Divisional finals to Eric Bristow.

First round
(England) Ian Robertson	Bye
(England) Mike Gregory	Bye
(Scotland) Jim Strathie	Bye
(Republic of Ireland) Tom O'Connor	2
(Sweden) Douglas Melander	0
(England) George Corke	2
(England) Dave Lee	0
(England) Paul Reynolds	2
(United States) Rick Ney	0
(Canada) George Hyde	2
(England) Steve Riley	1
(England) Eric Bristow	2
(England) Simon Wilson	0

Quarterfinals
(England) Ian Robertson	2
(England) Mike Gregory	1
(Scotland) Jim Strathie	2
(Republic of Ireland) Tom O'Connor	1
(England) George Corke	0
(England) Paul Reynolds	2
(Canada) George Hyde	0
(England) Eric Bristow	2

Semifinals
(England) Ian Robertson	2
(Scotland) Jim Strathie	0
(England) Paul Reynolds	0
(Wales) Eric Bristow	2

Final
(England) Ian Robertson	0
(England) Eric Bristow	2

== 1985 Final stages ==
Eric Bristow lost in the first round of the Staffordshire County finals to Robin Feltham. John Lowe, Jocky Wilson and Mike Gregory also failed to qualify for the final stage.

First round
(France) Glenn Brooksbank	Bye
(England) Sandy Miller	Bye
(Netherlands) Ronnie Peel	Bye
(England) Billy Dunbar	2
(Republic of Ireland) Anthony Turner	0
(United States) Dan Valletto	2
(Scotland) Eddie McArthur	0
(England) Dave Lee	2
(Norway) Jan-Erik Paulsen	0
(Canada) Bob Sinnaeve	2
(England) Dave Whitcombe	1
(England) George Rogers	2
(England) Martin Deverell	0

Quarterfinals
(France) Glenn Brooksbank	2
(England) Sandy Miller	1
(Netherlands) Ronnie Peel	1
(England) Billy Dunbar	2
(United States) Dan Valletto	0
(England) Dave Lee	2
(Canada) Bob Sinnaeve	1
(England) George Rogers	2

Semifinals
(France) Glenn Brooksbank	0
(England) Billy Dunbar	2
(England) Dave Lee	2
(England) George Rogers	1

Final
(England) Billy Dunbar	0
(England) Dave Lee	2

== 1986 Final stages ==
First round
(England) Bobby George	Bye
(England) Brian Hardy	Bye
(England) Ritchie Gardner	Bye
(Wales) Chris Johns	2
(Republic of Ireland) Jack McKenna	1
(England) Mark Pope	2
(England) Graham Ward	1
(United States) Rick Ney	2
(England) Mike Gregory	1
(Canada) Bob Sinnaeve	2
(England) Lenny Taylor	1
(Sweden) Lars-Erik Karlsson	2
(Scotland) Ronnie Sharp	0

Quarterfinals
(England) Bobby George	2
(England) Brian Hardy	1
(England) Ritchie Gardner	2
(Wales) Chris Johns	1
(England) Mark Pope	1
(United States) Rick Ney	2
(Canada) Bob Sinnaeve	1
(Sweden) Lars-Erik Karlsson	2

Semifinals
(England) Bobby George	2
(England) Ritchie Gardner	0
(United States) Rick Ney	2
(Sweden) Lars-Erik Karlsson	1

Final
(England) Bobby George	2
(United States) Rick Ney	0

== 1987 Final stages ==
Steve Beaton beat reigning world champion John Lowe in the semi finals and five times world champion Eric Bristow in the final of Midland Counties Divisional finals.

First round
(England) Mike Gregory	Bye
(England) Steve Beaton	Bye
(England) Mick Whittaker	Bye
(Canada) Bob Sinnaeve	2
(England) Chris Moffatt	1
(England) John Garbutt	2
(Scotland) Alan Brown	0
(England) Peter Evison	2
(Sweden) Stefan Lord	1
(England) Simon Duke	2
(Republic of Ireland) John Joe O'Shea	0
(Wales) Malcolm Davies	2
(United States) Jerry Umberger	1

Quarterfinals
(England) Mike Gregory	2
(England) Steve Beaton	1
(England) Mick Whittaker	1
(Canada) Bob Sinnaeve	2
(England) John Garbutt	1
(England) Peter Evison	2
(England) Simon Duke	2
(Wales) Malcolm Davies	0

Semifinals
(England) Mike Gregory	2
(Canada) Bob Sinnaeve	1
(England) Peter Evison	2
(England) Simon Duke	1

Final
(England) Mike Gregory	2
(England) Peter Evison	0

== 1988 Final stages ==
Phil Taylor lost in the semi finals of the Staffordshire County finals. Steve Jones beat John Lowe in the semi finals of the Midland Counties Divisional finals.

First round
(England) Tony Jenkinson	Bye
(Republic of Ireland) Pat O'Shea	Bye
(Sweden) Magnus Caris	Bye
(England) Mike Gregory	2
(England) Dennis Williams	0
(England) Ronnie Baxter	2
(England) Steve Jones	0
(England) Kevin Spiolek	2
(Scotland) Rab Lusk	0
(Canada) Bob Sinnaeve	2
(United States) Ray Davidson	0
(England) David Jones	2
(England) Colin Clixby	0

Quarterfinals
(England) Tony Jenkinson	2
(Republic of Ireland) Pat O'Shea	1
(Sweden) Magnus Caris	1
(Canada) Mike Gregory	2
(England) Ronnie Baxter	0
(England) Kevin Spiolek	2
(Canada) Bob Sinnaeve	2
(England) David Jones	1

Semifinals
(England) Tony Jenkinson	1
(England) Mike Gregory	2
(England) Kevin Spiolek	2
(Canada) Bob Sinnaeve	0

Final
(England) Mike Gregory	2
(England) Kevin Spiolek	0

== 1989 Final stages ==
Eric Bristow lost in the quarter finals (to Mick Plevyn) and Phil Taylor lost in the semi finals of the North Staffordshire heats, played at Bristow's public house The Crafty Cockney. Darrell Morley beat John Lowe in the final of the Derbyshire County finals. Mike Gregory failed to win a hat-trick of titles. He lost in the first round of the Western Counties Divisional finals to Chris Whiting.

First round
(England) Chris Whiting	Bye
(Scotland) Joe Leary	Bye
(England) Reg Cupit	2
(United States) Dan Valletto	1
(England) Dennis Priestley	2
(Sweden) Stefan Nagy	1
(Scotland) Jocky Wilson	2
(Republic of Ireland) John Dunne	0
(England) Dave Whitcombe	2
(England) Denis Ovens	0
(England) Arnie Bunn	2
(Canada) Dave Green	0
(Wales) David Furnish	2
(Norway) Gunnar Johansen	0

Quarterfinals
(England) Chris Whiting	2
(Scotland) Joe Leary	0
(England) Reg Cupit	0
(England) Dennis Priestley	2
(Scotland) Jocky Wilson	1
(England) Dave Whitcombe	2
(England) Arnie Bunn	2
(Wales) David Furnish	0

Semifinals
(England) Chris Whiting	0
(England) Dennis Priestley	2
(England) Dave Whitcombe	2
(England) Arnie Bunn	0

Final
(England) Dennis Priestley	1
(England) Dave Whitcombe	2

== 1990 Final stages ==
Reigning world champion Phil Taylor lost in the first round of the Staffordshire sub-area finals to Mark Flowers, played at Eric Bristow's public house The Crafty Cockney. Flowers beat Bristow in the semi finals on the same day.

First round
(Canada) Scott Swanson	Bye
(Belgium) Geert Jennes	Bye
(Wales) John Gronow	Bye
(Russia) Andrei Patriki	Bye
(United States) Len Heard	Bye
(Norway) Knud Nilsen	Bye
(England) Steve Hudson	Bye
(England) John Bell	Bye
(England) Paul Cook	Bye
(Finland) Heikki Hermunen	Bye
(Republic of Ireland) Kevin Marron	Bye
(England) Nigel Justice	Bye
(Sweden) Michael Oskarsson	2
(Switzerland) Daniel Mueller	1
(England) Brian Derbyshire	2
(Netherlands) Bert Vlaardingerbroek	1
(Scotland) David McFadden	2
(Italy) Mauro Pavan	0
(England) Peter Evison	2
(England) Steve Beaton	1

Second round
(Canada) Scott Swanson	2
(Belgium) Geert Jennes	0
(Wales) John Gronow	2
(Russia) Andrei Patriki	0
(United States) Len Heard	2
(Norway) Knud Nilsen	1
(England) Steve Hudson	2
(England) John Bell	0
(England) Paul Cook	2
(Finland) Heikki Hermunen	0
(Republic of Ireland) Kevin Marron	2
(England) Nigel Justice	0
(Sweden) Michael Oskarsson	0
(England) Brian Derbyshire	2
(Scotland) David McFadden	0
(England) Peter Evison	2

Quarterfinals
(Canada) Scott Swanson	2
(Wales) John Gronow	1
(United States) Len Heard	0
(England) Steve Hudson	2
(England) Paul Cook	2
(Republic of Ireland) Kevin Marron	0
(England) Brian Derbyshire	2
(England) Peter Evison	1

Semifinals
(Canada) Scott Swanson	1
(England) Steve Hudson	2
(England) Paul Cook	2
(England) Brian Derbyshire	0

Final
(England) Steve Hudson	0
(England) Paul Cook	2

== 1997 Final stages ==
First round
(England) Julian Bullock	2
(Wales) Tony Ridler	0
(England) Phil Taylor	2
(England) Shayne Burgess	1
(Republic of Ireland) Tom O'Connor	2
(Republic of Ireland) Kieran Lennon	1
(England) Brian Derbyshire	2
(England) Larry Amner	0
(England) Nigel Justice	2
(Italy) Sergio Bongiovanni	0
(England) Martin Adams	2
(England) Steve Maish	1
(Republic of Ireland) Michael Dwyer	2
(Scotland) Jim Brawley	1
(England) Dave Solly	2
(England) Dean Allsopp	0
(England) John Dye	2
(England) Simon Laws	1
(England) Andy Jenkins	2
(England) Paul Knighton	0
(England) Colin Fowler	2
(England) Mark Robinson	1
(England) Chris Thompson	2
(England) Colin Monk	1
(England) Peter Manley	2
(England) Mark Pooke	1
(England) Chris Whiting	2
(Scotland) Mark Veitch	1
(England) Gary Spedding	2
(England) Gary Johnson	0
(England) Ian White	2
(Republic of Ireland) Des Byrne	1

Second round
(England) Julian Bullock	1
(England) Phil Taylor	2
(Republic of Ireland) Tom O'Connor	2
(England) Brian Derbyshire	0
(England) Nigel Justice	1
(England) Martin Adams	2
(Republic of Ireland) Michael Dwyer	1
(England) Dave Solly	2
(England) John Dye	0
(England) Andy Jenkins	2
(England) Colin Fowler	1
(England) Chris Thompson	2
(England) Peter Manley	2
(England) Chris Whiting	1
(England) Gary Spedding	1
(England) Ian White	2

Quarterfinals
(England) Phil Taylor	2
(Republic of Ireland) Tom O'Connor	1
(England) Martin Adams	2
(England) Dave Solly	0
(England) Andy Jenkins	2
(England) Chris Thompson	1
(England) Peter Manley	1
(England) Ian White	2

Semifinals
(England) Phil Taylor	2
(England) Martin Adams	1
(England) Andy Jenkins	1
(England) Ian White	2

Final
(England) Phil Taylor	2
(England) Ian White	0
