= News of the World Darts Championship draws 1972–1982 =

Former English darts competition

News of the World Championship
- Founded: 1927
- Folded: 1997
- Country: England
- Venue: Various venues in London
- Last champions: (England) Phil Taylor (England) Linda Jones (1996–97)
- Tournament format: Legs

The News of the World Darts Championship began in 1927 as a regional darts competition. In 1946/7 the first national competition was held. By the 1970s it attracted players from all over the world. All players needed to win through in county and regional stages of the competition to reach the final stages, which were first televised in 1972. Matches were short, with just two legs being required for victory. The oche was slightly longer than most tournaments, being a full 8 feet from the board to the toe line. The early televised events until 1977 were held at Alexandra Palace, London. The event moved to Wembley Arena, Wembley, London in 1978.

== See also ==
- News of the World Darts Championship draws 1983-1997

== 1972 Final stages ==
First round
(Wales) Alan Evans	Bye
(England) Mick Roper	Bye
(England) Dennis Filkins	Bye
(England) Vince King	Bye
(England) Brian Netherton	Bye
(England) Peter Crane	Bye
(England) John Walker	2
(Australia) Barry Atkinson	0
(England) Jack Jones	Bye

Quarterfinals
(Wales) Alan Evans	2
(England) Mick Roper	1
(England) Dennis Filkins	2
(England) Vince King	0
(England) Brian Netherton	2
(England) Peter Crane	0
(England) John Walker	2
(England) Jack Jones	1

Semifinals
(Wales) Alan Evans	2
(England) Dennis Filkins	1
(England) Brian Netherton	2
(England) John Walker	1

Final
(Wales) Alan Evans	0
(England) Brian Netherton	2

== 1973 Final stages ==
First round
(England) Roy Baker	Bye
(Sweden) Orvar Svensson	Bye
(England) Ron Church	Bye
(England) Denby Parkin	Bye
(England) Ken Batchelor	Bye
(Scotland) Bob Whyte	2
(England) Bob Ludkin	1
(England) Ivor Hodgkinson	2
(England) Rod Hailstone	0
(Wales) Tony Ridler	2
(United States) Al Lippman	0

Quarterfinals
(England) Roy Baker	2
(Sweden) Orvar Svensson	0
(England) Ron Church	2
(England) Denby Parkin	0
(England) Ken Batchelor	2
(Scotland) Bob Whyte	0
(England) Ivor Hodgkinson	2
(Wales) Tony Ridler	0

Semifinals
(England) Roy Baker	1
(England) Ron Church	2
(England) Ken Batchelor	0
(England) Ivor Hodgkinson	2

Final
(England) Ron Church	1
(England) Ivor Hodgkinson	2

== 1974 Final stages ==
First round
(England) Peter Chapman	Bye
(England) Eddie Brown	Bye
(Republic of Ireland) Jim McQuillan	Bye
(Sweden) Tom Bafverfeldt	Bye
(United States) Al Lippman	2
(Wales) Leighton Rees	0
(England) Joe Givnan	2
(England) Bill Bryson	0
(England) Paul Gosling	2
(England) John Moore	0
(England) Paul Jackson	2
(England) Rob McDonald	0

Quarterfinals
(England) Peter Chapman	2
(England) Eddie Brown	1
(Republic of Ireland) Jim McQuillan	2
(Sweden) Tom Bafverfeldt	1
(United States) Al Lippman	0
(England) Joe Givnan	2
(England) Paul Gosling	2
(England) Paul Jackson	0

Semifinals
(England) Peter Chapman	2
(Republic of Ireland) Jim McQuillan	1
(England) Joe Givnan	1
(England) Paul Gosling	2

Final
(England) Peter Chapman	2
(England) Paul Gosling	1

== 1975 Final stages ==
First round
(England) Derek White	Bye
(England) Keith Farrow	Bye
(England) Ron Colby	Bye
(United States) Conrad Daniels	Bye
(England) Bill Duddy	2
(England) Fred Allott	0
(Scotland) Sandy Aitken	2
(England) Jack Jones	0
(England) Vic Baxendale	2
(Sweden) Gunnar Moberg	0
(Wales) Phil Obbard	2
(Republic of Ireland) Jack McKenna	1

Quarterfinals
(England) Derek White	2
(England) Keith Farrow	1
(England) Ron Colby	2
(United States) Conrad Daniels	0
(England) Bill Duddy	2
(Scotland) Sandy Aitken	1
(England) Vic Baxendale	0
(Wales) Phil Obbard	2

Semifinals
(England) Derek White	2
(England) Ron Colby	1
(England) Bill Duddy	2
(Wales) Phil Obbard	0

Final
(England) Derek White	2
(England) Bill Duddy	1

== 1976 Final stages ==
First round
(England) Bill Lennard	Bye
(Republic of Ireland) Seamus O'Brien	Bye
(England) Sid Webb	Bye
(England) Gordon Bristo	Bye
(England) Stewart McCleary	2
(Sweden) Stefan Lord	1
(Wales) Leighton Rees	2
(England) Bob Brown	1
(United States) Tony Money	2
(Scotland) Joe McKay	0
(England) George Champion	2
(England) Peter Chapman	0

Quarterfinals
(England) Bill Lennard	2
(Republic of Ireland) Seamus O'Brien	0
(England) Sid Webb	2
(England) Gordon Bristo	0
(England) Stewart McCleary	1
(Wales) Leighton Rees	1
(United States) Tony Money	1
(England) George Champion	2

Semifinals
(England) Bill Lennard	2
(England) Sid Webb	1
(Wales) Leighton Rees	2
(England) George Champion	0

Final
(England) Bill Lennard	2
(Wales) Leighton Rees	0

== 1977 Final stages ==
First round
(England) Bob Crosland	Bye
(Wales) Mick McDermott	Bye
(England) Jack Jones	Bye
(England) Eddie Bush	Bye
(England) Bryan Smart	2
(Australia) Hugh Barnsley	0
(England) Mick Norris	2
(England) Kim Brown	1
(United States) Rick Wobensmith	2
(Republic of Ireland) Seamus O'Brien	0
(England) John Lowe	2
(Scotland) Neil Campbell-Adams	0

Quarterfinals
(England) Bob Crosland	2
(Wales) Mick McDermott	0
(England) Jack Jones	2
(England) Eddie Bush	1
(England) Bryan Smart	0
(England) Mick Norris	2
(United States) Rick Wobensmith	0
(England) John Lowe	2

Semifinals
(England) Bob Crosland	2
(England) Jack Jones	1
(England) Mick Norris	2
(England) John Lowe	0

Final
(England) Bob Crosland	0
(England) Mick Norris	2

== 1978 Final stages ==
First round
(England) Lionel Smith	Bye
(Wales) Tony Clark	Bye
(England) John Coward	Bye
(England) Roger Smith	2
(United States) John Zimnawoda	0
(England) Jack Bentley	2
(Australia) Alan Grant	1
(Sweden) Stefan Lord	2
(England) Tony Brown	0
(Scotland) Jocky Wilson	2
(England) Bobby George	1
(Republic of Ireland) Jim McQuillan	2
(England) Gerry Haywood	1

Quarterfinals
(England) Lionel Smith	2
(Wales) Tony Clark	0
(England) John Coward	2
(England) Roger Smith	0
(England) Jack Bentley	0
(Sweden) Stefan Lord	2
(Scotland) Jocky Wilson	2
(Republic of Ireland) Jim McQuillan	0

Semifinals
(England) Lionel Smith	1
(England) John Coward	2
(Sweden) Stefan Lord	2
(Scotland) Jocky Wilson	1

Final
(England) John Coward	0
(Sweden) Stefan Lord	2

== 1979 Final stages ==
World champion John Lowe lost in the final of the Derbyshire County finals to Jack Holmes. Eric Bristow lost in quarter finals of the London and Home Counties Divisional finals to Martin Humphrey.

First round
(Wales) Lance Richards	Bye
(United States) Jake Brestowski	Bye
(England) Bobby George	Bye
(England) George Adams	Bye
(England) Martin Humphrey	2
(England) Ron Bayliss	0
(Republic of Ireland) Eddie Morrissey	2
(Scotland) Stan Morris	0
(England) Alan Glazier	2
(Sweden) Stefan Lord	0
(England) John Herrmann	2
(England) Terry Crawford	0

Quarterfinals
(Wales) Lance Richards	2
(United States) Jake Brestowski	0
(England) Bobby George	2
(England) George Adams	0
(England) Martin Humphrey	2
(Republic of Ireland) Eddie Morrissey	0
(England) Alan Glazier	2
(England) John Herrmann	1

Semifinals
(Wales) Lance Richards	0
(England) Bobby George	2
(England) Martin Humphrey	0
(England) Alan Glazier	2

Final
(England) Bobby George	2
(England) Alan Glazier	0

== 1980 Final stages ==
First round
(England) Dave Whitcombe	Bye
(United States) Rick Ney	Bye
(Republic of Ireland) Pat Kiely	Bye
(Wales) Tony Clark	Bye
(England) John Lowe	2
(England) Tony Bowers	1
(England) Bobby George	2
(England) Colin Kemys	1
(Sweden) Stefan Lord	2
(England) George Forrest	1
(England) Alan Turnbull	2
(Scotland) Jim Brogan	0

Quarterfinals
(England) Dave Whitcombe	2
(United States) Rick Ney	0
(Republic of Ireland) Pat Kiely	2
(Wales) Tony Clark	1
(England) John Lowe	2
(England) Bobby George	0
(Sweden) Stefan Lord	2
(England) Alan Turnbull	0

Semifinals
(England) Dave Whitcombe	2
(Republic of Ireland) Pat Kiely	0
(England) John Lowe	1
(Sweden) Stefan Lord	2

Final
(England) Dave Whitcombe	0
(Sweden) Stefan Lord	2

== 1981 Final stages ==
World champion Eric Bristow lost in the quarter finals of the Staffordshire County finals to Les Capewell.

First round
(England) John Lowe	Bye
(United States) Cam Melchiore	Bye
(Scotland) Rab Smith	Bye
(Sweden) Stefan Lord	Bye
(England) Mick Norris	2
(England) Bob Crosland	0
(England) Ian Knowles	2
(England) Roland Hill	0
(Republic of Ireland) John-Paul Kinsella	2
(Wales) Malcolm Padmore	0
(England) Alan Blewitt	2
(England) Stan Harding	0

Quarterfinals
(England) John Lowe	2
(United States) Cam Melchiore	1
(Scotland) Rab Smith	2
(Sweden) Stefan Lord	0
(England) Mick Norris	2
(England) Ian Knowles	0
(Republic of Ireland) John-Paul Kinsella	1
(England) Alan Blewitt	2

Semifinals
(England) John Lowe	2
(Scotland) Rab Smith	1
(England) Mick Norris	2
(England) Alan Blewitt	0

Final
(England) John Lowe	2
(England) Mick Norris	0

== 1982 Final stages ==
First round
(England) Roy Morgan	Bye
(England) John Kane	Bye
(England) John Yelland	Bye
(England) Bobby George	Bye
(Republic of Ireland) John Buckley	Bye
(Wales) Jim Hughes	2
(United States) Rick Ney	0
(Scotland) Jocky Wilson	2
(England) Graham Collins	0
(Wales) Alan Evans	2
(England) Joe Dodd	0

Quarterfinals
(England) Roy Morgan	2
(England) John Kane	0
(England) John Yelland	2
(England) Bobby George	0
(Republic of Ireland) John Buckley	0
(Wales) Jim Hughes	2
(Scotland) Jocky Wilson	2
(Wales) Alan Evans	0

Semifinals
(England) Roy Morgan	2
(England) John Yelland	1
(Wales) Jim Hughes	2
(Scotland) Jocky Wilson	1

Final
(England) Roy Morgan	2
(Wales) Jim Hughes	1
