= Swedish Open (darts) =

Tournament information
- Venue: Gamlestadstorget (1987–1989); Solnahallen (1994–); Gothia Tennishall (1996); Täby Park (1998–); Scandic Hotel Triangeln (2013–)
- Location: Gothenburg (1987–1989, 1993, 1996, 1999–2009); Malmö (1990–1991, 1995, 2013–); Borgholm (1992); Stockholm (1994, 2010–2012); Lund (1997); Täby (1998)
- Country: Sweden
- Established: 1969
- Organisation(s): WDF
- Format: Legs
- Prize fund: SEK 100,000
- Month(s) Played: August

Current champion(s)
- Xanti Van den Bergh (men's); Aletta Wajer (women's)

Final champion(s)
- Kevin Lundström (boys); Samantha Krop (girls)

The Swedish Open is a darts tournament established in 1969, held in Malmö since 2013.

== List of tournaments ==
=== Men's ===
Year	Champion	Av.	Score	Runner-Up	Av.	Prize Money			Venue
Year	Champion	Av.	Score	Runner-Up	Av.	Total	Champion	Runner-up	Venue
1969	Barry Twomlow		2 – 1	Paul Gosling					
1970	(England) Tom Barrett		2 – 1	Barry Twomlow					
1971	(England) Tom Barrett (2)		2 – 0	Peter Paulsen					
1972	Brian Netherton		2 – 1	Ingemar Björling					
1973	(England) Kim Brown		2 – 0	Gunnar Moberg					
1974	(England) Peter Chapman		beat	(England) Kim Brown					
1975	(England) Bill Perry		beat	(England) Derek White					
1976	Bill Lennard		beat	Tom Bafverfeldt					
1977	(England) Bill Perry (2)		3 – 2	Stefan Lord					
1978	Alan Glazier		beat	(England) Gary Lawrence					
1979	Eric Bristow		beat	Nicky Virachkul					
1980	Tony Sontag		2 – 1	(England) Gordon Watson					
1981	Eric Bristow (2)		beat	Stefan Lord					
1982	Eric Bristow (3)		3 – 2	Jocky Wilson					
1984	Bjørn Enqvist		4 – 1	Gunnar Tåhlin					
1985	Dave Whitcombe		beat	Cliff Lazarenko					
1986	Bob Anderson		beat	Mike Gregory					
1987	Dave Whitcombe (2)		beat	Bob Anderson					Gamlestadstorget, Gothenburg
1988	Steve Gittins		beat	Dave Whitcombe					Gamlestadstorget, Gothenburg
1989	Mike Gregory		beat	Eric Bristow					Gamlestadstorget, Gothenburg
1990	Dave Whitcombe (3)		beat	Peter Evison					Malmö
1991	Rod Harrington		beat	Stefan Lord					Malmö
1992	Mike Gregory (2)		beat	Dennis Priestley					Borgholm
1993	Per Skau		beat	Jann Hoffmann					Gothenburg
1994	Eric Burden		beat	Magnus Caris					Solnahallen, Stockholm
1995	Wayne Weening		beat	Steve Beaton					Malmö
1996	Roland Scholten		beat	Andy Jenkins					Gothia Tennishall, Gothenburg
1997	Ritchie Davies		3 – 1	Roland Scholten					Lund
1998	Raymond van Barneveld		4 – 2	Peter Manley					Täby Park, Täby
1999	Erik Clarys		beat	Raymond van Barneveld					Gothenburg
2000	Kevin Painter		5 – 4	Steve Beaton					Gothenburg
2001	Stefan Nagy		4 – 1	Matt Clark					Gothenburg
2002	Raymond van Barneveld (2)		beat	Darryl Fitton					Gothenburg
2003	Raymond van Barneveld (3)		4 – 2	Ted Hankey					Gothenburg
2004	Shaun Greatbatch		4 – 2	Tony Martin		SEK 29,000	SEK 11,000	SEK 5,000	Gothenburg
2005	Tony Eccles		4 – 2	Mareno Michels		SEK 29,000	SEK 11,000	SEK 5,000	Gothenburg
2006	Tony Eccles (2)	92.04	4 – 3	Remco van Eijden	89.13	SEK 29,000	SEK 11,000	SEK 5,000	Gothenburg
2007	Shaun Greatbatch (2)		4 – 1	Dave Prins		SEK 29,000	SEK 11,000	SEK 5,000	Gothenburg
2008	Scott Waites		beat	Scott Mitchell		SEK 29,000	SEK 11,000	SEK 5,000	Gothenburg
2009	Willy van de Wiel		4 – 0	Anders Åström		SEK 31,400	SEK 16,000	SEK 5,000	Gothenburg
2010	Göran Klemme		5 – 4	Veijo Viinikka		SEK 55,000	SEK 25,000	SEK 10,000	Stockholm
2011	Scott Waites (2)		6 – 4	Tony O'Shea		SEK 55,000	SEK 25,000	SEK 10,000	Stockholm
2012	Garry Thompson		6 – 4	Willy van de Wiel		SEK 55,000	SEK 25,000	SEK 10,000	Stockholm
2013	Jeffrey de Graaf		5 – 1	Dennis Nilsson		SEK 78,500	SEK 30,000	SEK 16,000	Scandic Hotel Triangeln, Malmö
2014	Alan Norris	111.33	6 – 0	Pip Blackwell	89.55	SEK 78,500	SEK 30,000	SEK 12,500	Scandic Hotel Triangeln, Malmö
2015	Jamie Hughes		6 – 1	Ryan de Vreede		SEK 78,500	SEK 30,000	SEK 12,500	Scandic Hotel Triangeln, Malmö
2016	Glen Durrant		6 – 0	Jamie Hughes		SEK 88,000	SEK 30,000	SEK 15,000	Scandic Hotel Triangeln, Malmö
2017	Scott Mitchell	97.35	6 – 1	Darryl Fitton	74.94	SEK 78,000	SEK 26,000	SEK 12,000	Scandic Hotel Triangeln, Malmö
2018	Daniel Day	90.72	6 – 4	Andreas Harrysson	81.03	SEK 78,000	SEK 26,000	SEK 12,000	Scandic Hotel Triangeln, Malmö
2019	Dennis Nilsson	93.03	6 – 1	Wayne Warren		SEK 82,000	SEK 28,000	SEK 14,000	Scandic Hotel Triangeln, Malmö
2022	Kai Fan Leung	71.54	5 – 1	Alexander Merkx	70.98	SEK 59,460	SEK 17,000	SEK 8,500	Scandic Hotel Triangeln, Malmö
2023	Thomas Junghans	74.58	6 – 4	Darren Johnson	78.34	SEK 60,000	SEK 20,000	SEK 10,000	Scandic Hotel Triangeln, Malmö
2024	Xanti Van den Bergh	79.33	6 – 4	Tonni Sorensen	81.25	SEK 70,000	SEK 20,000	SEK 10,000	Scandic Hotel Triangeln, Malmö

=== Women's ===
Year	Champion	Av.	Score	Runner-Up	Av.	Prize Money			Venue
Year	Champion	Av.	Score	Runner-Up	Av.	Total	Champion	Runner-up	Venue
2007	Carina Ekberg		beat	Rachna David		SEK	SEK	SEK	
2008	Carina Ekberg (2)		beat	Kristin Bomander		SEK	SEK	SEK	
2009	Carina Ekberg (3)		4 – 2	Gretel Glasö		SEK	SEK	SEK	
2010	Deta Hedman (5)		5 – 2	Irina Armstrong		SEK 20,000	SEK 6,000	SEK 3,000	Stockholm
2011	Irina Armstrong		5 – 4	Deta Hedman		SEK 20,000	SEK 6,000	SEK 3,000	Stockholm
2012	Trina Gulliver		5 – 2	Tamara Schuur		SEK 20,000	SEK 6,000	SEK 3,000	Stockholm
2013	Lorraine Winstanley		4 – 3	Trina Gulliver		SEK 32,000	SEK 10,000	SEK 5,000	Scandic Hotel Triangeln, Malmö
2014	Lorraine Winstanley (2)		5 – 3	Zoe Jones		SEK 32,000	SEK 10,000	SEK 5,000	Scandic Hotel Triangeln, Malmö
2015	Casey Gallagher		5 – 2	Anastasia Dobromyslova		SEK 35,600	SEK 10,000	SEK 5,600	Scandic Hotel Triangeln, Malmö
2016	Lisa Ashton		5 – 0	Deta Hedman		SEK 38,400	SEK 12,000	SEK 6,000	Scandic Hotel Triangeln, Malmö
2017	Lorraine Winstanley (3)	73.26	5 – 4	Aileen de Graaf	74.94	SEK 34,400	SEK 10,000	SEK 5,000	Scandic Hotel Triangeln, Malmö
2018	Lorraine Winstanley (4)	78.06	5 – 4	Aileen de Graaf	76.08	SEK 34,400	SEK 10,000	SEK 5,000	Scandic Hotel Triangeln, Malmö
2019	Mikuru Suzuki	81.03	5 – 3	Lisa Ashton		SEK 35,400	SEK 11,000	SEK 5,000	Scandic Hotel Triangeln, Malmö
2022	Lorraine Winstanley (5)	84.71	5 – 3	Aletta Wajer	66.09	SEK 29,720	SEK 8,500	SEK 4,250	Scandic Hotel Triangeln, Malmö
2023	Beau Greaves	78.86	5 – 4	Deta Hedman	82.03	SEK 30,000	SEK 10,000	SEK 5,000	Scandic Hotel Triangeln, Malmö
2024	Aletta Wajer	72.27	5 – 2	Anca Zijlstra	69.86	SEK 30,000	SEK 10,000	SEK 5,000	Scandic Hotel Triangeln, Malmö
