= 1988 BDO World Darts Championship =

Tournament information
- Dates: 9–17 January 1988
- Venue: Lakeside Country Club
- Location: Frimley Green, Surrey
- Country: England
- Organisation(s): BDO
- Format: Sets; Final – best of 11
- Prize fund: £71,600
- Winner's share: £16,000
- High checkout: 164 (Wales) Alan Evans

Champion(s)
- (England) Bob Anderson

The 1988 BDO World Darts Championship (known for sponsorship reasons as The 1988 Embassy World Darts Championship) was held at the Lakeside Country Club in Frimley Green, Surrey between 9 and 17 January 1988. The tournament was won by the number 1 seed, Bob Anderson, who played to a high level throughout the week, averaging over 90 in all of his games and over 97 in all but one.

== Seeds ==
1. (England) Bob Anderson
2. (England) John Lowe
3. (England) Eric Bristow
4. (Canada) Bob Sinnaeve
5. (England) Mike Gregory
6. (Scotland) Jocky Wilson
7. (England) Cliff Lazarenko
8. (England) Dave Whitcombe

== Prize money ==
The prize fund was £69,600.

Champion: £16,000
Runner-Up: £8,000
Semi-Finalists (2): £4,000
Quarter-Finalists (4): £2,200
Last 16 (8): £1,600
Last 32 (16): £1,000

There was also a 9 Dart Checkout prize of £52,000, along with a High Checkout prize of £1,000.

== The results ==
First Round (best of 5 sets)
1	(England) Bob Anderson (97.38)	3
(Netherlands) Bert Vlaardingerbroek (87.30)	1
(Australia) Russell Stewart (86.43)	3
(Belgium) Johnny Deley (77.16)	1
8	(England) Dave Whitcombe (83.76)	1
(England) Peter Evison (85.11)	3
(Northern Ireland) Fred McMullan (83.31)	3
(Finland) Tapani Uitos (75.90)	0
5	(England) Mike Gregory (83.85)	0
(Wales) Chris Johns (85.50)	3
(United States) Rick Ney (86.82)	3
(Sweden) Magnus Caris (83.46)	1
4	(Canada) Bob Sinnaeve (82.41)	3
(Australia) Horrie Seden (84.27)	2
(England) Dennis Hickling (82.77)	3
(Scotland) Robert MacKenzie (81.51)	2
2	(England) John Lowe (93.48)	3
(England) Keith Deller (80.07)	1
(Singapore) Paul Lim (88.53)	3
(Sweden) Stefan Lord (79.83)	0
7	(England) Cliff Lazarenko (85.92)	3
(United States) Tony Payne (86.76)	1
(England) Paul Reynolds (90.78)	3
(Sweden) Lars Erik Karlsson (81.24)	0
6	(Scotland) Jocky Wilson (89.13)	3
(Australia) Terry O'Dea (85.89)	1
(Wales) Alan Evans (88.89)	3
(Canada) Danny MacInnis (75.93)	0
3	(England) Eric Bristow (87.12)	3
(Northern Ireland) Ray Farrell (84.06)	2
(England) Ritchie Gardner (82.08)	3
(England) Arnie Bunn (82.17)	0

Second Round (best of 5 sets)
1	(England) Bob Anderson (97.20)	3
(Australia) Russell Stewart (87.96)	0
(England) Peter Evison (83.40)	3
(Northern Ireland) Fred McMullan (83.67)	0
(Wales) Chris Johns (86.49)	1
(United States) Rick Ney (89.52)	3
4	(Canada) Bob Sinnaeve (86.25)	0
(England) Dennis Hickling (85.83)	3
2	(England) John Lowe (80.70)	3
(Singapore) Paul Lim (81.84)	1
7	(England) Cliff Lazarenko (84.48)	2
(England) Paul Reynolds (86.85)	3
6	(Scotland) Jocky Wilson (90.06)	3
(Wales) Alan Evans (84.15)	2
3	(England) Eric Bristow (87.99)	3
(England) Ritchie Gardner (84.12)	0

Quarter-Finals (best of 7 sets)
1	(England) Bob Anderson (98.43)	4
(England) Peter Evison (94.29)	0
(United States) Rick Ney (85.80)	4
(England) Dennis Hickling (84.03)	1
2	(England) John Lowe (93.90)	4
(England) Paul Reynolds (89.61)	3
6	(Scotland) Jocky Wilson (86.97)	2
3	(England) Eric Bristow (88.80)	4

Semi-Finals (best of 9 sets)
1	(England) Bob Anderson (97.62)	5
(United States) Rick Ney (85.05)	0
2	(England) John Lowe (89.73)	5
3	(England) Eric Bristow (90.03)	2

Final (best of 11 sets)
1	(England) Bob Anderson (92.70)	6
2	(England) John Lowe (92.07)	4

Malcolm Davies of Wales who broke his hand was replaced by Terry O'Dea of Australia in the first round
