= 1994 BDO World Darts Championship =

Tournament information
- Dates: 1–8 January 1994
- Venue: Lakeside Country Club
- Location: Frimley Green, Surrey
- Country: England, United Kingdom
- Organisation(s): BDO
- Format: Sets; Final – best of 11
- Prize fund: £136,100
- Winner's share: £32,000
- High checkout: 161 (Scotland) Trevor Nurse (Denmark) Troels Rusel (Sweden) Magnus Caris (England) Nick Gedney

Champion(s)
- (Canada) John Part

The 1994 BDO World Darts Championship (known for sponsorship reasons as the 1994 Embassy World Darts Championship) was held following two years of controversy within the sport of darts. After the 1993 Championships, several players decided it was time to part company with the British Darts Organisation and form their own organisation, the World Darts Council (now known as the Professional Darts Corporation (PDC)). By the start of this tournament, the WDC were in the closing days of their own 1994 World Championship, with Dennis Priestley going on to beat Phil Taylor in the final.

Phil Taylor, Eric Bristow, John Lowe, Dennis Priestley, Jocky Wilson, Rod Harrington, Alan Warriner, Peter Evison, Richie Gardner, Keith Deller, Bob Anderson, Cliff Lazarenko, Kevin Spiolek, Jamie Harvey, Mike Gregory and Chris Johns were the players who formed the WDC and therefore did not participate at these 1994 Championships. Mike Gregory and Chris Johns eventually decided to go back to the BDO, but were unable to play in the 1994 BDO World Championship as their change was too late for them to be able to qualify.

Dan Waddell wrote that the tournament "had the feel of the 1980 Moscow Olympics after the US boycott, or Test cricket during Packer's World Series; the best players and most enthralling characters in the game weren't there, so the whole event felt hollow and fraudulent."

Of the 32 players who took part in the Championship, 17 were world championship debutants, with many having never appeared in front of TV cameras before, including the eventual champion, John Part. Of the remaining 15 players in the tournament, only 8 of those had appeared in the 1993 Championship, with the other 7 having previously appeared in the World Championship in years before 1993.

In an astonishing first round, 7 out of the 8 seeded players were knocked out, including the new BDO World Number One, Steve Beaton who had risen to the top of the rankings as a result of the defecting players. Only number 3 seed Roland Scholten won his first round match, although he went out in round two.

As a result, players previously unheard of had a chance to make a name for themselves and Canada's John Part dropped only one set en route to the Championship. He beat Ronnie Baxter, Paul Lim, Steve McCollum and Ronnie Sharp on the way to final. Part then overwhelmed Bobby George 6-0 in the final.

George, despite struggling with back problems, had reached his first final in 14 years. His semi-final against Sweden's Magnus Caris saw him comeback from 4 sets to 2 down, winning 9 successive legs to secure his place in the final. In the final, George hit less than 10% of his checkouts (5 from 49 attempts due to the immense pain caused by his broken back which he didn't know was broken at the time.) and that was the difference as Part became the first player from outside the United Kingdom to win the World Championship. Despite being a surprise winner at the time, Part would also go on to win the PDC's version of the world championship on two occasions.

Future three-time winner Martin Adams would also make his debut in this year's tournament. He qualified for the event every year until 2018, meaning he has the record for the BDO World Championship and is behind only Steve Beaton, Phil Taylor and John Lowe for consecutive appearances across both versions of the world championship.

== Prize money ==
The prize fund was £136,100.

Champion: £32,000
Runner-Up: £16,000
Semi-Finalists (2): £7,700
Quarter-Finalists (4): £3,800
Last 16 (8): £2,800
Last 32 (16): £1,500

There was also a 9 Dart Checkout prize of £52,000, along with a High Checkout prize of £1,500.

== Seeds ==
1. (England) Steve Beaton
2. (England) Ronnie Baxter
3. (Netherlands) Roland Scholten
4. (Australia) Wayne Weening
5. (Denmark) Per Skau
6. (England) Dave Askew
7. (England) Shayne Burgess
8. (Australia) Russell Stewart

== The Results ==
First Round (best of 5 sets)
1	(England) Steve Beaton (89.40)	2
(England) Nick Gedney (87.21)	3
(England) Kevin Kenny (88.23)	3
(England) Kevin Painter (85.68)	2
8	(Australia) Russell Stewart (79.17)	0
(England) Bobby George (84.06)	3
(Wales) Martin Phillips (85.53)	3
(Wales) Richard Herbert (86.13)	2
5	(Denmark) Per Skau (78.30)	0
(England) Martin Adams (93.00)	3
(Scotland) Bob Taylor (89.52)	3
(United States) Tony Payne (82.68)	0
4	(Australia) Wayne Weening (86.25)	2
(Sweden) Magnus Caris (86.25)	3
(Belgium) Leo Laurens (87.33)	3
(Wales) Eric Burden (88.86)	0
2	(England) Ronnie Baxter (81.66)	0
(Canada) John Part (85.23)	3
(Singapore) Paul Lim (84.84)	3
(United States) Jim Damore (80.19)	0
7	(England) Shayne Burgess (77.52)	0
(England) Steve McCollum (80.31)	3
(England) Colin Monk (85.14)	3
(Denmark) Jann Hoffmann (81.42)	0
6	(England) Dave Askew (72.51)	0
(England) Ian Sarfas (78.96)	3
(Denmark) Troels Rusel (83.64)	3
(Scotland) Alan Brown (84.60)	1
3	(Netherlands) Roland Scholten (88.95)	3
(Wales) Sean Palfrey (85.59)	0
(Scotland) Ronnie Sharp (82.02)	3
(Scotland) Trevor Nurse (78.15)	2

Second Round (best of 5 sets)
(England) Nick Gedney (85.14)	2
(England) Kevin Kenny (82.17)	3
(England) Bobby George (91.71)	3
(Wales) Martin Phillips (83.01)	1
(England) Martin Adams (90.21)	3
(Scotland) Bob Taylor (87.24)	1
(Sweden) Magnus Caris (91.68)	3
(Belgium) Leo Laurens (75.72)	0
(Canada) John Part (83.22)	3
(Singapore) Paul Lim (79.11)	0
(England) Steve McCollum (86.85)	3
(England) Colin Monk (84.15)	1
(England) Ian Sarfas (81.96)	1
(Denmark) Troels Rusel (82.47)	3
3	(Netherlands) Roland Scholten (86.19)	1
(Scotland) Ronnie Sharp (84.69)	3

Quarter-Finals (best of 7 sets)
(England) Kevin Kenny (82.29)	2
(England) Bobby George (81.54)	4
(England) Martin Adams (85.86)	2
(Sweden) Magnus Caris (88.05)	4
(Canada) John Part (90.99)	4
(England) Steve McCollum (86.13)	0
(Denmark) Troels Rusel (73.38)	1
(Scotland) Ronnie Sharp (81.75)	4

Semi-Finals (best of 9 sets)
(England) Bobby George (89.43)	5
(Sweden) Magnus Caris (88.41)	4
(Canada) John Part (88.98)	5
(Scotland) Ronnie Sharp (87.51)	1

Final (best of 11 sets)
(England) Bobby George (80.30)	0
(Canada) John Part (82.44)	6
