= 1987 BDO World Darts Championship =

Tournament information
- Dates: 9–17 January 1987
- Venue: Lakeside Country Club
- Location: Frimley Green, Surrey
- Country: England
- Organisation(s): BDO
- Format: Sets; Final – best of 11
- Prize fund: £60,300
- Winner's share: £14,000
- High checkout: 161 (Scotland) Jocky Wilson (England) John Lowe

Champion(s)
- (England) John Lowe (men's) (Australia) Rowan Barry (youth's)

The 1987 BDO World Darts Championship (known for sponsorship reasons as The 1987 Embassy World Darts Championship) was held at the Lakeside Country Club in Frimley Green, Surrey between 9 and 17 January 1987. John Lowe, the 1979 champion and four-time runner-up in the event, beat three-time defending champion Eric Bristow 6-4 in a repeat of the 1981 and 1985 finals. This marked a turning point in darts; Bristow had won the title for the three consecutive years prior to this. His defeat by Lowe was his first in the World Championship since 1983. Despite reaching the final of this event three more times (1989, 1990 and 1991) he would never again win the world title.

== Seeds ==
1. (England) Eric Bristow
2. (England) John Lowe
3. (England) Mike Gregory
4. (England) Bob Anderson
5. (England) Dave Whitcombe
6. (Scotland) Jocky Wilson
7. (England) Cliff Lazarenko
8. (England) Keith Deller

== Prize money ==
The prize fund was £62,000.

Champion: £14,000
Runner-Up: £7,000
Semi-finalists (2): £3,500
Quarter-finalists (4): £2,900
Last 16 (8): £1,400
Last 32 (16): £700

There was also a 9 Dart Checkout prize of £52,000, along with a High Checkout prize of £1,000.

== The results ==
First round (best of 5 sets)
1	(England) Eric Bristow (88.80)	3
(United States) Tony Payne (84.78)	0
(United States) Rick Ney (83.73)	3
(Australia) Terry O'Dea (81.18)	1
8	(England) Keith Deller (81.90)	0
(Wales) Brian Cairns (83.61)	3
(Sweden) Lars Erik Karlsson (81.72)	3
(Scotland) Peter McDonald (78.72)	1
5	(England) Dave Whitcombe (79.74)	2
(Canada) Bob Sinnaeve (83.43)	3
(Wales) Alan Evans (89.28)	3
(Northern Ireland) Ray Farrell (84.45)	2
4	(England) Bob Anderson (92.07)	3
(Wales) Peter Locke (83.73)	0
(Singapore) Paul Lim (77.07)	3
(Finland) Kexi Heinäharju (77.58)	1
2	(England) John Lowe (89.64)	3
(England) Bobby George (88.17)	1
(England) Dave Lee (95.28)	3
(England) Kevin Kenny (93.90)	0
7	(England) Cliff Lazarenko (90.15)	3
(Australia) Russell Stewart (89.07)	2
(Finland) Tapani Uitos (80.04)	3
(Scotland) Robert MacKenzie (73.56)	0
6	(Scotland) Jocky Wilson (88.65)	3
(Wales) Ceri Morgan (78.45)	0
(Belgium) Frans Devooght (74.88)	3
(Canada) Avtar Gill (70.77)	1
3	(England) Mike Gregory (89.55)	3
(Wales) Leighton Rees (78.39)	0
(England) Ritchie Gardner (82.08)	3
(England) Alan Glazier (77.76)	0

Second round (best of 5 sets)
1	(England) Eric Bristow (88.35)	3
(United States) Rick Ney (84.99)	0
(Wales) Brian Cairns (79.32)	2
(Sweden) Lars Erik Karlsson (79.08)	3
(Canada) Bob Sinnaeve (88.41)	0
(Wales) Alan Evans (93.06)	3
4	(England) Bob Anderson (86.40)	3
(Singapore) Paul Lim (80.55)	1
2	(England) John Lowe (99.15)	3
(England) Dave Lee (90.93)	1
7	(England) Cliff Lazarenko (81.63)	3
(Finland) Tapani Uitos (90.27)	2
6	(Scotland) Jocky Wilson (83.64)	3
(Belgium) Frans Devooght (79.92)	1
3	(England) Mike Gregory (94.50)	3
(England) Ritchie Gardner (86.43)	0

Quarter-finals (best of 7 sets)
1	(England) Eric Bristow (96.30)	4
(Sweden) Lars Erik Karlsson (87.24)	1
(Wales) Alan Evans (84.51)	4
4	(England) Bob Anderson (89.94)	3
2	(England) John Lowe (95.70)	4
7	(England) Cliff Lazarenko (83.91)	0
6	(Scotland) Jocky Wilson (82.56)	4
3	(England) Mike Gregory (88.38)	3

Semi-finals (best of 9 sets)
1	(England) Eric Bristow (88.59)	5
(Wales) Alan Evans (82.23)	0
2	(England) John Lowe (94.83)	5
6	(Scotland) Jocky Wilson (92.85)	0

Final (best of 11 sets)
1	(England) Eric Bristow (94.29)	4
2	(England) John Lowe (90.63)	6

== 1987 BDO World Youth Championship ==
=== Seeds ===
1. (England) Mark Day
2. (England) Shaun Greatbatch
3. (Australia) Rowan Barry
4. (Singapore) Harith Lim

Semi-finals (best of 3 sets)

- (England) Mark Day 1–2 (Singapore) Harith Lim
- (Australia) Rowan Barry 2–1 (England) Shaun Greatbatch

Final (best of 5 sets)

- (Singapore) Harith Lim 2–3 (Australia) Rowan Barry
