= Australian Grand Masters =

Tournament information
- Venue: Canberra Labour Club
- Location: Canberra
- Country: Australia
- Established: 1974
- Organisation(s): DAI / BDO category B / WDF category 3
- Format: Legs
- Prize fund: A$9,600

Current champion(s)
- (Australia) Aaron Morrison

The Australian Grand Masters is a darts tournament that has been held since 1974.

== List of tournaments ==
=== Men's ===
Year	Champion (average in final)	Score	Runner-up (average in final)	Total Prize Money	Champion	Runner-up
1974	(Australia) George Foster	?–?	(Scotland) Harry Heenan	?	?	?
1975	(Australia) George Foster	?–?	(United States) Conrad Daniels	?	?	?
1976	(Australia) Kevin White	?-?	(Australia) George Foster	?	?	?
1977	(Australia) Matt Banovich	?-?	(Australia) Barry Atkinson	?	?	?
1978	(Australia) Tim Brown	?-?	(Australia) Barry Delbridge	?	?	?
1979	(Australia) Frank Palko	?-?	(Australia) Alan Grant	?	?	?
1980	(Australia) Alan Grant	?-?	(England) Ray Cornibert	?	?	?
1981	(Australia) Bruce Matthews	?-?	(Australia) Andy Robinson	?	?	?
1982	(Australia) Tim Brown	?-?	(Australia) Russell Stewart	?	?	?
1983	(Singapore) Paul Lim	?-?	(Australia) David Crack	?	?	?
1984	(Australia) Horrie Seden	?-?	(Australia) Kevin White	?	?	?
1985	(England) John Lowe	?-?	(Australia) Frank Palko	?	?	?
1986	(England) Mike Gregory	?-?	(Australia) Horrie Seden	?	?	?
1987	(Australia) Russell Stewart	5-2	(Australia) Terry O'Dea	?	?	?
1988	(Australia) Russell Stewart	5-2	(Australia) Horrie Seden	?	?	?
1989	(Australia) Russell Stewart	?-?	(Australia) Wayne Weening	?	?	?
1990	(Australia) Russell Stewart	?-?	(Australia) Robert Cofey	?	?	?
1991	(Australia) Keith Sullivan	?-?	(Australia) Ian Findlayson	?	?	?
1992	(England) Mike Gregory	?-?	(Australia) Brian Bigham	?	?	?
1993	(Australia) Russell Stewart	?-?	(Australia) Wayne Weening	?	?	?
1994	(Australia) Wayne Atkins	?-?	(New Zealand) Peter Hunt	?	?	?
1995	(Australia) Wayne Atkins	6-5	(Australia) Wayne Weening	?	?	?
1996	(Australia) Peter Hinkley	?-?	(Australia) Wayne Weening	?	?	?
1997	(Australia) Peter Hinkley	?-?	(Australia) Wayne Weening	?	?	?
1998	(Australia) Steve Duke	?-?	(Australia) Dave Anderson	?	?	?
1999	(Australia) Steve Duke	?-?	(Australia) Graham Hunt	?	?	?
2000	(Australia) Peter Hinkley	?-?	(Australia) Tony David	?	?	?
2001	(Australia) Russell Stewart	?-?	(Australia) Tony David	?	?	?
2002	(Australia) Tony David	?-?	(Australia) Steve Duke	?	?	?
2003	(New Zealand) Peter Hunt	?-?	(Australia) Tony David	?	?	?
2004	(Australia) Simon Whitlock	?-?	(Australia) Tony Fleet	A$9,500	A$2,800	A$1,300
2005	(Australia) Simon Whitlock	?-?	(Australia) Kyle Anderson	?	?	?
2006	(Australia) Simon Whitlock	?-?	(Australia) Joe Comito	?	?	?
2007	(Australia) Simon Whitlock (89.82)	5-0	(Australia) Tony David (81.48)	A$9,000	A$2,900	A$1,400
2008	(Australia) Tony David	5-3	(Australia) Rob Modra	A$9,000	A$2,900	A$1,400
2009	(Australia) Tony Fleet (88.95)	5-3	(Australia) Shane Tichowitsch (84.57)	A$9,000	A$2,900	A$1,400
2010	(Australia) Tony Fleet		(Australia) Neil Hembrow	A$9,600	A$3,100	A$1,500
2011	(Australia) Darren Webster		(Australia) Tony Fleet	A$9,600	A$3,100	A$1,500
2012	(Australia) Adam Rowe	5-3	(Australia) Dave Muller	A$9,600	A$3,100	A$1,500
2013	(Australia) Darren Webster	5-0	(Australia) Jason Murdoch	A$9,600	A$3,100	A$1,500
2014	(Australia) Craig Atze		(Australia) Dan Chapman	A$9,600	A$3,100	A$1,500
2015	(Australia) Peter Machin		(Australia) Scott Johnson	A$9,600	A$3,100	A$1,500
2016	(Australia) Corey Cadby		(Australia) Peter Machin	A$9,600	A$3,100	A$1,500
2017	(Australia) Peter Machin		(New Zealand) Corey Cadby	A$9,600	A$3,100	A$1,500
2018	(Australia) Peter Machin	7–6	(Australia) Raymond Smith	A$9,600	A$3,100	A$1,500
2019	(Australia) Aaron Morrison	7–6	(Australia) Mike Bonser	A$9,600	A$3,000	A$1,500
2021	(Australia) Donovan Lottering	8–7	(New Zealand) Landon Gardiner	A$9,600	A$3,000	A$1,500
2022	(Australia) Brandon Weening	8–3	(New Zealand) Haupai Puha	A$9,600	A$3,000	A$1,500
2023	(New Zealand) Jonny Tata	8–6	(Australia) Brandon Weening	A$9,600	A$3,000	A$1,500

=== Ladies ===
Year	Champion	Score	Runner-up	Total Prize Money	Champion	Runner-up
1991	(Australia) Dot McLeod	beat	(Australia) Louise Ball	?	?	?
1992	(Australia) Buba Sylva	beat	(England) Mandy Solomons	?	?	?
1993	(Australia) Christine Richardson-Clark	beat	(Australia) Carol Forwood	?	?	?
1994	(England) Deta Hedman	beat	(Australia) Lee-Ann Faulkner	?	?	?
1995	(Australia) Christine Richardson-Clark	beat	(Australia) Bubs Sylva	?	?	?
1996	(Australia) Dot McLeod	beat	(England) Tricia Wright	?	?	?
1997	(Australia) Dot McLeod	beat	(Australia) Megan Rodgers	?	?	?
1998	(Australia) Dot McLeod	beat	(Australia) Pam Burr	?	?	?
1999	(Australia) Dot McLeod	beat	(New Zealand) Lilian Barnett	?	?	?
2000	(Australia) Natalie Carter	beat	(Australia) Kerry Jacobs-Slattery	?	?	?
2001	(Australia) Dot McLeod	beat	(Australia) Kerry Jacobs-Slattery	?	?	?
2002	(Australia) Dot McLeod	beat	(Australia) Kerry Jacobs-Slattery	?	?	?
2003	(New Zealand) Jannette Jonathan	beat	(New Zealand) Megan Smith	?	?	?
2004	(Australia) Natalie Carter	beat	(Australia) Kerry Jacobs-Slattery	?	?	?
2005	(Australia) Dot McLeod	beat	(Australia) Natalie Carter	?	?	?
2006	(Australia) Natalie Carter	beat	(New Zealand) Jannette Jonathan	?	?	?
2007	(Australia) Lavinia Hogg	beat	(Australia) Louise Ball	?	?	?
2008	(Australia) Corrine Hammond	beat	(Australia) Janine Cassar	?	?	?
2009	(Australia) Carol Forwood	4–3	(Australia) Corrine Hammond	?	?	?
2010	(Australia) Carol Forwood	beat	(Australia) Louise Ball	?	?	?
2011	(Australia) Natalie Carter	beat	(Australia) Louise Ball	?	?	?
2012	(Australia) Natalie Carter	4–0	(Australia) Melissa Sinnott	?	?	?
2013	(Australia) Lorraine Burn	4–1	(Australia) Linda Dobbin	?	?	?
2014	(Australia) Kym Kelly	beat	(New Zealand) Meta Reid	?	?	?
2015	(Australia) Corrine Hammond	beat	(Australia) Natalie Carter	?	?	?
2016	(Australia) Corrine Hammond	beat	(Australia) Natalie Carter	?	?	?
2017	(New Zealand) Judy Fenton	6–2	(Australia) Barb Smyth	?	?	?
2018	(Australia) Corrine Hammond	6–1	(Australia) Lorraine Burn	?	?	?
2019	(Australia) Tori Kewish	6–2	(Australia) Barb Smyth	?	?	?
2021	(Australia) Tori Kewish	6–1	(Australia) Natalie Carter	?	?	?

== Tournament records ==
- Most wins 6: (Australia) Russell Stewart.
- Most Finals 6: (Australia) Russell Stewart.
- Most Semi-finals 7: (Australia) Russell Stewart.
- Most Quarter-finals 9: (Australia) Russell Stewart.
- Most Appearances 11: (Australia) Russell Stewart.
- Most Prize Money won £5,175: (Scotland) Ross Montgomery.
- Best winning average (92.67) : (Australia) Tony David v's (Australia) Peter Phillips, 2007 Quarter-final.
- Youngest Winner age 26: (Australia) Russell Stewart.
- Oldest Winner age 47: (Australia) Steve Duke.
