= 1991 BDO World Darts Championship =

BDO World Darts Championship

Tournament information
- Dates: 4–12 January 1991
- Venue: Lakeside Country Club
- Location: Frimley Green, Surrey
- Country: England
- Organisation(s): BDO
- Format: Sets; Final – best of 11
- Prize fund: £110,500
- Winner's share: £26,000
- High checkout: 170 (England) Kevin Kenny

Champion(s)
- (England) Dennis Priestley

The 1991 BDO World Darts Championship (known for sponsorship reasons as the 1991 Embassy World Darts Championship) was held at the Lakeside Country Club in Frimley Green, Surrey from 4 to 12 January 1991. Phil Taylor was the defending champion, having won the title for the first time at the previous year's tournament, but he lost 4–3 in the quarter-finals to Dennis Priestley. Priestley defeated Eric Bristow 6–0 in the final to win his first world title. It was Bristow's tenth and last appearance in a world final and the only one in which he failed to win a single set.

== Seeds ==
1. (England) Phil Taylor
2. (England) Peter Evison
3. (England) Eric Bristow
4. (England) Alan Warriner
5. (England) Bob Anderson
6. (England) Dave Whitcombe
7. (Scotland) Jocky Wilson
8. (Sweden) Magnus Caris

== Prize money ==
The prize fund was £108,200.

Champion: £26,000
Runner-Up: £13,000
Semi-Finalists (2): £6,500
Quarter-Finalists (4): £3,250
Last 16 (8): £2,400
Last 32 (16): £1,500

There was also a 9 Dart Checkout prize of £52,000, along with a High Checkout prize of £1,500.

== The Results ==
First Round (best of 5 sets)
1	(England) Phil Taylor (95.97)	3
(Wales) Martin Phillips (89.37)	1
(United States) Tony Payne (80.16)	3
(Wales) Chris Johns (81.42)	1
8	(Sweden) Magnus Caris (78.03)	0
(England) Dennis Priestley (93.30)	3
(Canada) Bob Sinnaeve (85.53)	3
(Wales) Eric Burden (86.73)	2
5	(England) Bob Anderson (78.12)	3
(Wales) Sean Palfrey (77.31)	2
(Australia) Russell Stewart (84.87)	3
(Norway) Knud Nilsen (75.93)	0
4	(England) Alan Warriner (96.84)	3
(Singapore) Paul Lim (83.07)	0
(Australia) Keith Sullivan (83.82)	3
(Netherlands) Raymond van Barneveld (74.88)	0
2	(England) Peter Evison (91.02)	3
(England) John Lowe (88.89)	2
(England) Kevin Kenny (88.65)	3
(Canada) Albert Anstey (83.46)	2
7	(Scotland) Jocky Wilson (89.64)	3
(England) Richie Gardner (82.02)	2
(England) Ronnie Baxter (83.46)	3
(Belgium) Bruno Raes (82.98)	1
6	(England) Dave Whitcombe (84.60)	3
(Denmark) Per Skau (79.62)	1
(England) Cliff Lazarenko (82.41)	3
(Scotland) Ronnie Sharp (82.62)	0
3	(England) Eric Bristow (90.54)	3
(Finland) Kexi Heinäharju (78.78)	0
(England) Mike Gregory (85.68)	3
(Scotland) Bob Taylor (78.60)	2

Second Round (best of 5 sets)
1	(England) Phil Taylor (99.99)	3
(United States) Tony Payne (86.22)	1
(England) Dennis Priestley (95.34)	3
(Canada) Bob Sinnaeve (83.91)	0
5	(England) Bob Anderson (88.08)	3
(Australia) Russell Stewart (83.97)	2
4	(England) Alan Warriner (84.60)	3
(Australia) Keith Sullivan (82.74)	2
2	(England) Peter Evison (85.65)	1
(England) Kevin Kenny (90.75)	3
7	(Scotland) Jocky Wilson (94.08)	3
(England) Ronnie Baxter (92.46)	1
6	(England) Dave Whitcombe (83.01)	3
(England) Cliff Lazarenko (77.67)	1
3	(England) Eric Bristow (87.75)	3
(England) Mike Gregory (88.95)	0

Quarter-Finals (best of 7 sets)
1	(England) Phil Taylor (96.21)	3
(England) Dennis Priestley (95.28)	4
5	(England) Bob Anderson (90.93)	4
4	(England) Alan Warriner (88.65)	3
(England) Kevin Kenny (88.74)	4
7	(Scotland) Jocky Wilson (86.52)	3
6	(England) Dave Whitcombe (86.43)	3
3	(England) Eric Bristow (90.84)	4

Semi-Finals (best of 9 sets)
(England) Dennis Priestley (93.87)	5
5	(England) Bob Anderson (90.06)	2
(England) Kevin Kenny (87.54)	2
3	(England) Eric Bristow (94.98)	5

Final (best of 11 sets)
(England) Dennis Priestley (92.57)	6
3	(England) Eric Bristow (84.15)	0

== Synopsis ==
The Tournament Friday 4 January - evening

There were three first round matches held on the first day of competition at the Lakeside. The opening match of the competition saw Tony Payne of the USA break his Lakeside duck by defeating Chris Johns of Wales 3-1 to advance to the second round. Payne had lost five consecutive years in the First Round. Then Phil Taylor, the number 1 seed began his defence of the World title with a 3-1 win over Martin Phillips of Wales. The reigning champion had a 95.97 average in advancing to a second round match against Tony Payne. In the final match of the day, Bob Sinnaeve defeated Eric Burden in a very tight game, by 3 sets to 2. There was just 1.2 points between the pair of them.

Saturday 5 January - afternoon In the first match of day two of the competition saw a big shock with the defeat of Magnus Caris the number 8 seed, knocked out 3-0 by Englishman Dennis Priestley, Dennis recording a 93.30 average in advancing to a match against Bob Sinnaeve. The second match saw Russell Stewart, Phil Taylor's first victim a year ago advance to the last 16 for the fourth time, the first time since 1989. Russ knocked out Knud Nilsen from Norway by 3-0 with 84.87 average. The final game of the afternoon saw very nearly the elimination of the number 5 seed, Bob Anderson for the second year running. He edged Sean Palfrey of Wales by 3 sets to 2 to go through to the second round.

Saturday 5 January - evening 3 more games on Saturday night. In the first, future champion Raymond van Barneveld from the Netherlands made his Lakeside debut. Keith Sullivan dropped two legs in the battle of the debutants. The second match was a let down for Paul Lim; He had hit a nine dart finish in the 1990 championship and advanced to the quarter-finals before losing 4-0 to Cliff Lazarenko, however this year, faced with a tough first round match against Alan Warriner lost 3-0 and bowed out in the first round. The final game saw Kevin Kenny defeat Albert Anstey 3-2 with an 88.65 average.

Sunday 6 January - Afternoon Three games on the afternoon of the busiest day of the championship (7 matches in total). The first saw the most eagerly anticipated clash of the first round, Peter Evison (seeded 2) against twice champion John Lowe. The Game, a very tight affair, saw Evison edge through 3-2 with a 91.02 average. The first time, Lowe had been eliminated in the first round at the World Championships. The second game saw the champion from 2 years ago and ever popular Scot Jocky Wilson begin his campaign with a tense 3-2 win over Richie Gardner. Wilson who edged three matches in 1989 in the deciding set brought memories of his last 16 triumph over Alan Warriner.

Sunday 6 January - evening Four matches tonight, all of them being played in the bottom quarter of the draw. First match on was Ronnie Sharp against Cliff Lazarenko, who had both reached the quarter-finals in 1990 - Sharp taking sets off Taylor. This time, it wasn't a close contest, with Lazarenko entering Round 2 with an easy 3-0 whitewash. Dave Whitcombe, seeded 6 and a seed for the first time since 1989, defeated Per Skau of Denmark with a 3-1 win, as well as an 84.6 average. Skau would enjoy later success at the Lakeside. Mike Gregory, who had lost his seeding (no.4) which he held last year, but to reach the semis again he would need to defeat the man who knocked him out in the last 4 5-2, Eric Bristow. The 3rd Seed defeated Kexi Heinaharju 3-0 to book a slot in the Second Round.
