= Avtar Gill (darts player) =

Canadian darts player (born 1952)

Personal information
- Born: 17 July 1952 (age 74) Hamilton, Ontario, Canada

Sport
- Sport: Darts
- Playing since: 1974
- Darts: 17g Winmau
- Laterality: Right-handed
- Walk-on music: "Don't Stop Believin'" by Journey

Organisation (see split in darts)
- BDO: 1981–1988
- PDC: 1997

WDF major events – best performances
- World Championship: Last 32: 1987
- World Masters: Last 128: 1986, 1987, 1988

PDC premier events – best performances
- World Matchplay: Last 40: 1997

Other tournament wins
- Tournament: Years
- Las Vegas Open: 1997

Avtar Gill (born 17 July 1952) is a Canadian former professional darts player who played in the Professional Darts Corporation (PDC) tournaments.

== Career ==
Gill played his second staged in the WDF World Cup of 1981 & 1987 represented by Team Canada with Michael Boaden, Ray Kippari & Ted Kyle from Nelson in New Zealand in 1981 and Copenhagen in Denmark in 1987 with Bob Sinnaeve, Danny MacInnis & Joe Gorski, before losing in the last 32 to America's Dan Pucillo by 2–4 legs.

Gill was runner-up in the 1986 Canada National Championships losing to Bob Sinnaeve in the final. Gill played in the 1987 World Professional Darts Championship, losing in the first round 3–1 in sets to Belgium's Frans Devooght. Gill played in 1997 on the PDC World Matchplay lost in the Last 40 to Andy Jenkins from England by 3–6.

Gill won the 1997 Las Vegas Open darts champions, beating by the final with American's Gerome Vardaro.

== World Championship results ==
=== BDO ===
- 1987: Last 32 (lost to Frans Devooght 1–3) (sets)
