= 1975 World Masters (darts) =

Professional darts tournament

Phonogram World Masters

Tournament information
- Dates: 1 October
- Venue: West Centre Hotel
- Location: Fulham
- Country: England
- Organisation(s): BDO
- Format: Sets
- Prize fund: £2000
- Winner's share: £1000

Champion(s)
- (Wales) Alan Evans

The 1975 Phonogram World Masters was the major tournament on the BDO/WDF calendar for 1975. It took place from 1 October at the West Centre Hotel, Fulham.

The tournament featured the best 60 players from around the world. 24 winners of major tournaments from the last year and an English qualifying round consisting of 36 players (2 from each county). The 36 County players played down to a last 8 before joining the 24 invitees to make the first round.

The final was an all Welsh affair between Alan Evans and David "Rocky" Jones with Evans winning his only World Masters title.

This tournament is notable for being the first major tournament entered by a then 18 year old Eric Bristow, who went on to dominate the game in the 1980s. Bristow failed to make the last 32 after losing in the England qualifiers earlier in the day.

== Prize money ==
Total Prize fund was £2000

- Champion £1000 and a HiFi
- Runner-up £500
- Third £200
- 4th £100
- Quarter finalists £50

== Qualifiers ==
International Qualifiers

1. (Belgium) Maurice Maenhout
2. (United States) Nicky Virachkul
3. (Denmark) Preben Schultz
4. (Denmark) Erik Christensen
5. (Gibraltar) Joe Goldwin
6. (South Africa) George Cottle
7. (South Africa) Harry Ellis
8. (Sweden) Douglas Melander
9. (Sweden) Stefan Lord
10. (Republic of Ireland) Jack McKenna
11. (Republic of Ireland) Jim McQuillan
12. (Wales) Garter Goodridge
13. (England) William Greenhough
14. (Scotland) Neil Campbell-Adams
15. (Scotland) David Baille
16. (South Africa) Steve Rollings
17. (United States) Conrad Daniels
18. (Wales) Phil Obbard
19. (Scotland) Willie Scott
20. (England) John Stanton
21. (Scotland) Eddie McArthur
22. (Scotland) John Ramsey
23. (Australia) Kevin White
24. (Australia) George Foster
25. (Australia) John Kelly
26. (Republic of Ireland) Seamus O'Brien
27. (England) Doug Priestner
28. (Scotland) Harry Heenan - 1974 World Master Runner-Up
29. (England) Jack North - N.D.A.G.B. Champion
30. (Wales) Alan Evans - British Open Champion
31. (Wales) Leighton Rees - 1974The Indoor League Champion
32. (England) Ron Church - Inter City Track Arrows
33. (England) Derek White - 1974 News of The World Champion
34. (Wales) David "Rocky" Jones - Unicorn Pairs Champion
35. (Wales) Ray Phillips - Unicorn Pairs Champion
36. (England) Cliff Inglis - 1974 World Master

English Qualifiers

1. (England) Lee Griffith - Sussex
2. (England) Brian Smart - Sussex
3. (England) Terry Harrison - Cleveland
4. (England) Jack Brown - Cleveland
5. (England) Barry Caldicott - Warwickshire
6. (England) Paul Tunley - Warwickshire
7. (England) Dennis Kilbourne - Northants
8. (England) Wally Burton - Northants
9. (England) Cyril Hayes - West
10. (England) Alf Jefferies - West
11. (England) Lionel Johns - Cornwall
12. (England) Ron Burley - Cornwall
13. (England) ~~Eric Bristow - London~~
14. (England) Peter Chapman - London
15. (England) Tony Johnson - Surrey
16. (England) George Lee - Surrey
17. (England) Lew Walker - Kent
18. (England) Ian Glennie - Kent
19. (England) Nobby Clark- Lancashire
20. (England) Bill Leonard - Lancashire
21. (England) Peter Horrobin - Cheshire
22. (England) George Walsh - Cheshire
23. (England) Des Stabb - Devon
24. (England) George Murphy - Devon
25. (England) Peter Spurdle - Somerset
26. (England) Les Cornall - Somerset
27. (England) Roy Williams - Thames Valley
28. (England) Sam Sherwood - Thames Valley
29. (England) Ron Miller - Herts
30. (England) Maurice Young - Herts
31. (England) Dennis Sharp - Bedfordshire
32. (England) Chris Garner - Bedfordshire
33. (England) Alex Hancock - Staffordshire
34. (England) Bob Lightfood - Staffordshire
35. (Isle of Man) John Craine - Isle Of Man
36. Dougy Caley - Isle of Man

== The results ==
=== Knockout stage ===
Quarter-finals; Best of 5 sets
1	(Wales) Alan Evans	3
8	(United States) Nicky Virachkul	1
4	(England) Jack North	3
5	(Scotland) David Baillie	2
2	(England) Bill Lennard	3
7	(England) Derek White	1
3	(Sweden) Douglas Melander	0
6	(Wales) David Jones	3

Semi-finals; Best of 5 sets
(Wales) Alan Evans	3
(England) Jack North	1
(England) Bill Lennard	2
(Wales) David Jones	3

Final; Best of 5 sets
(Wales) Alan Evans	3
(Wales) David Jones	1
