= Horrie Seden =

Australian darts player

Personal information
- Born: 6 April 1946 (age 80) Cairns, Queensland, Australia

Sport
- Sport: Darts
- Playing since: 1964
- Darts: 26g Unicorn
- Laterality: Right-handed
- Walk-on music: "The Heat Is On" by Glenn Frey

Organisation (see split in darts)
- BDO: 1984–1988

WDF major events – best performances
- World Championship: Last 32: 1988
- World Masters: Last 32: 1984

Other tournament wins
- Tournament: Years
- Australian Grand Masters Pacific Open: 1984; 1987

Horrie Seden (born 6 April 1946) is an Australian former professional darts player who played in British Darts Organisation (BDO) events in the 1980s.

== Career ==
Born in Cairns, Queensland, Seden won the 1984 Australian Grand Masters and played in the 1984 Winmau World Masters, losing in the first round to Ceri Morgan.

Seden then played in the 1988 BDO World Darts Championship but lost in the first round 3–2 in sets to Bob Sinnaeve.

Seden quit the BDO in 1988.

== World Championship results ==
=== BDO ===
- 1988: Last 32: (lost to Bob Sinnaeve 2–3) (sets)
