= Russell Stewart =

Australian darts player

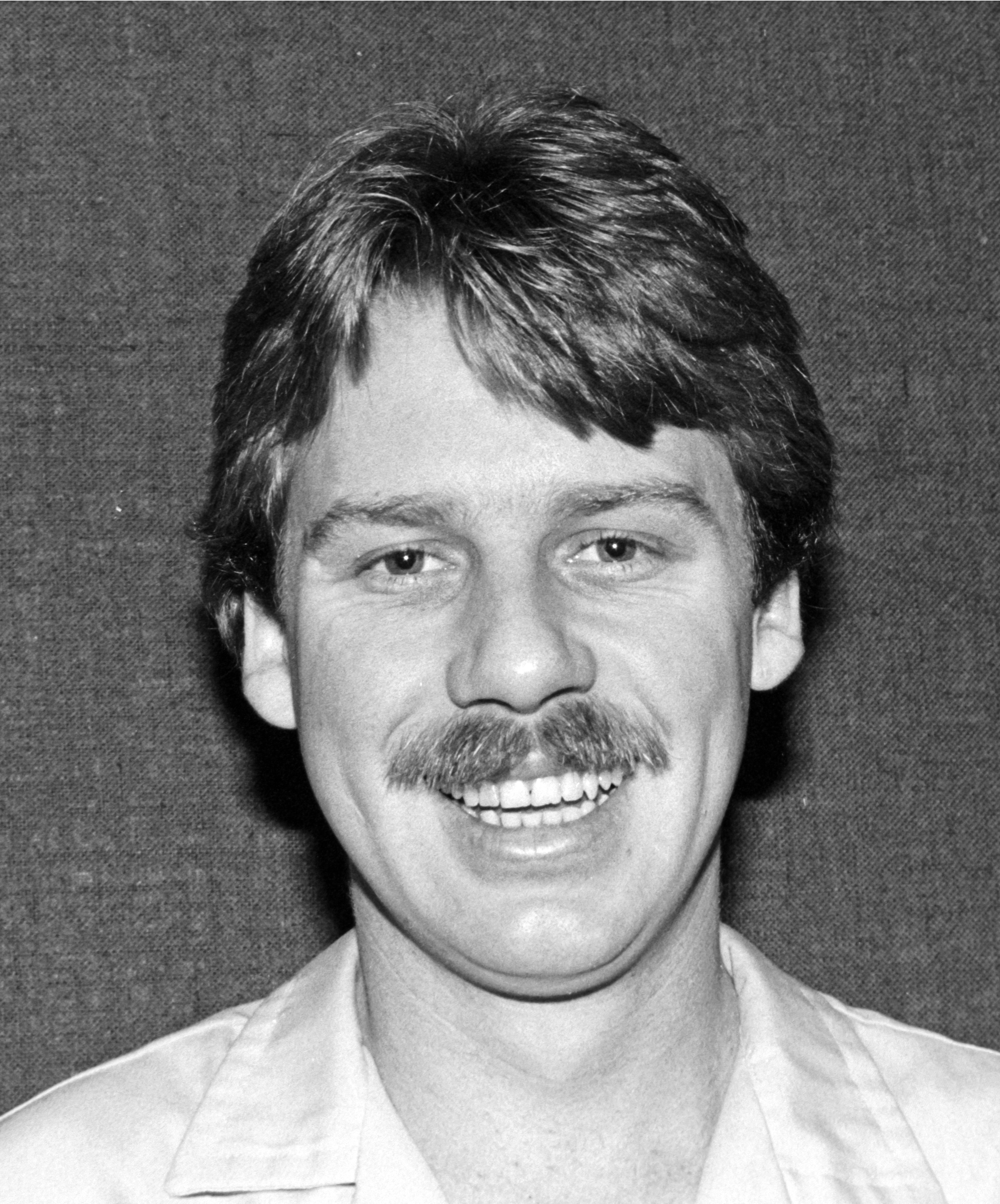
- Stewart in 1985

Personal information
- Nickname: "Rusty"
- Born: 9 October 1960 (age 66) Melbourne, Australia
- Home town: Canberra, Australia

Sport
- Sport: Darts
- Playing since: 1976
- Darts: 24g PUMA
- Laterality: Right-handed
- Walk-on music: "Highway to Hell" by AC/DC

Organisation (see split in darts)
- BDO: 1983–2002
- PDC: 2005–2021

WDF major events – best performances
- World Championship: Last 16: 1985, 1988, 1989, 1991, 1995
- World Masters: Quarter Finals: 1985, 1988

PDC premier events – best performances
- World Championship: Last 64: 2009

Other tournament wins
- Years
Australian Grand Masters	1987, 1988, 1989, 1990, 1993, 2001
Australian Masters	1983, 1984, 1985, 1987, 1988
Central Coast Classic	2007
DPA Australian Matchplay	2008
Mittagong RSL Open	2008, 2012
Oceanic Masters	2008
Pacific Masters	1983, 1984, 1990
Russell Stewart Classic	2008
Scottish Open	1983
Viva Las Vegas	2008
Medal record
Men's Darts
Representing Australia
WDF Asia-Pacific Cup
Gold medal – first place	1988 Tokyo	Men's singles
Gold medal – first place	1988 Tokyo	Men's pairs
Gold medal – first place	1988 Tokyo	Men's overall
Gold medal – first place	1988 Tokyo	Mixed pairs
Gold medal – first place	1990 Singapore	Men's pairs
Gold medal – first place	1994 Vancouver	Men's singles
Gold medal – first place	1994 Vancouver	Team event
Bronze medal – third place	2002 Bangkok	Team event

Russell "Rusty" Stewart (born 9 October 1960) is an Australian former professional darts player. He used the nickname Rusty for his matches.

== Playing career ==
Stewart was one of the most successful Australian darts players of the 1980s, Australian Singles Champion four times (1988, 1989, 1993 and 1994), also Pacific Masters Champion three times (1983, 1984, 1990), winning the Australian Masters five times in six years (1983, 1984, 1985, 1987, 1988) and the Australian Grand Masters six times in three different decades (1987, 1988, 1989, 1990, 1993, 2001). He won Pacific Cup singles on two occasions in Tokyo, Japan and Vancouver, Canada. His only major title won on UK soil was the Scottish Open in 1983, but he twice reached the semi-finals of the MFI World Matchplay and was also a quarter-finalist at the Winmau World Masters in 1985 and 1988. He came runner up to Eric Bristow MBE in then the world's richest dart tournament the World Grand Prix – Tokyo 1988. He obtained his highest world ranking position in November 1989 at No. 2 to Bob Anderson who was the No. 1 ranked player.

He made his World Championship debut in 1984, but lost in the first round to Peter Locke. He competed eleven times at the BDO World Championship, but failed to progress beyond the last sixteen. Between 1985 and 1991, he suffered defeats to some of the best players of the era including to Bob Anderson in 1988 and Phil Taylor in 1990 during their world title runs.

Stewart represented Australia in seven WDF World Cup teams; 1983 Edinburgh, Scotland, 1985 Brisbane, Australia, 1987 Copenhagen, Denmark, 1989 Toronto, Canada, 1993 Las Vegas, United States, 1995 Basel, Switzerland and 2001 Kuala Lumpur, Malaysia.

Stewart was runner-up in the 1985 WDF World Cup pairs with Frank Palko, lost to Eric Bristow and John Lowe by 0–4.

After eight successive appearances in the world championships, he missed out in 1992 and 1993 but returned to the event in 1994 following the loss of many top players who left to form the World Darts Council. He went out to Bobby George in the first round in 1994 and to Richie Burnett in the second round in 1995 – Burnett went on to take the title.

Stewart only managed to qualify for the World Championship on one further occasion – when he suffered a first round defeat to Mervyn King in 2002.

Stewart continued to compete in darts tournaments in his native country – adding more titles to his collection. He narrowly missed out on qualification for the 2006 PDC World Darts Championship, losing in the final of the Oceanic Masters to Warren Parry and suffered a semi-final defeat to 15-year-old Mitchell Clegg the following year. Stewart finally captured the Oceanic Masters in 2008 and earned qualification for the 2009 PDC World Darts Championship. It was his PDC World Championship debut and only his second appearance in any version of the World Championship in 14 years. He was beaten 3–1 in the first round by Adrian Lewis.

== Outside darts ==
Stewart earns his living working for the Australian Government in Canberra.

== World Championship results ==
=== BDO ===
- 1984: 1st Round (lost to Peter Locke 0–2) (sets)
- 1985: 2nd Round (lost to Jocky Wilson 1–3)
- 1986: 1st Round (lost to Malcolm Davies 1–3)
- 1987: 1st Round (lost to Cliff Lazarenko 2–3)
- 1988: 2nd Round (lost to Bob Anderson 0–3)
- 1989: 2nd Round (lost to Dennis Hickling 0–3)
- 1990: 1st Round (lost to Phil Taylor 1–3)
- 1991: 2nd Round (lost to Bob Anderson 2–3)
- 1994: 1st Round (lost to Bobby George 0–3)
- 1995: 2nd Round (lost to Richie Burnett 1–3)
- 2002: 1st Round (lost to Mervyn King 1–3)

=== PDC ===
- 2009: 1st Round (lost to Adrian Lewis 1–3)

== Performance timeline ==
Tournament	1982	1983	1984	1985	1986	1987	1988	1989	1990	1991	1992	1993	1994	1995	1996	1997	1998	1999	2000	2001	2002	2003	2004	2005	2006	2007	2008	2009
BDO World Championship	DNQ		1R	2R	1R	1R	2R	2R	1R	2R	DNQ		1R	2R	Did not participate						1R	Did not participate						
Winmau World Masters	2R	2R	2R	QF	4R	4R	QF	2R	2R	DNP	2R	DNP		2R	Did not participate													
MFI World Matchplay	Not held		QF	DNP	SF	DNP	SF	Not held																				
PDC World Championship	Not yet founded												Did not participate															1R

Performance Table Legend
DNP	Did not play at the event	DNQ	Did not qualify for the event	NYF	Not yet founded	#R	lost in the early rounds of the tournament (WR = Wildcard round, RR = Round robin)
QF	lost in the quarter-finals	SF	lost in the semi-finals	F	lost in the final	W	won the tournament
