= Bob Sinnaeve =

Canadian darts player (born 1949)

Personal information
- Born: 10 October 1949 (age 77) Tilsonburg, Ontario, Canada
- Home town: Langton, Ontario, Canada

Sport
- Sport: Darts
- Playing since: 1969
- Darts: 21 Gram Shot
- Laterality: Right-handed
- Walk-on music: "Bohemian Like You" by The Dandy Warhols

Organisation (see split in darts)
- BDO: 1979–1992, 2010–2017
- PDC: 1998, 2008–2010

WDF major events – best performances
- World Championship: Last 16: 1987, 1988, 1991
- World Masters: Runner Up: 1986

PDC premier events – best performances
- US Open/WSoD: Last 64: 2009, 2010

Other tournament wins
- Years
ADO Buckeye Open	2011
ADO Cleveland Extravaganza	2012
ADO Indianapolis St. Pats Open	2012
ADO Little River Casino Classic	2010, 2012
ADO PA Open	2010
ADO Syracuse Open	2010
Canada National Ch'ships	1979, 1983, 1986, 1987, 1991

Other achievements
- Canada's number one ranked player (1981–1992); Inducted to Canadian Darts Hall of Fame (2002)

Bob Sinnaeve (born October 10, 1949) is a Canadian former professional darts player.

== Early career ==
Sinnaeve took up darts in 1973 as an alternative to bowling, as he felt the darts circuit would give him more time to spend with his wife, Judy. He first appeared at the World Masters in 1979 and made his World Professional Darts Championship debut in 1982, but lost in the first round to Alan Evans.

== World Championship record ==
Sinnaeve appeared at the World Championship on ten occasions, but managed to win only three matches in that time. He lost in the first round on his first four attempts (1982, 1984, 1985 and 1986), and finally won a match in 1987, producing a major upset by beating Dave Whitcombe, who reached the final in the previous year. His only other match wins came in 1988 against Horrie Seden, and in 1991 against Eric Burden. His last appearance at the World Championship came in 1992, when he lost 1–3 to Paul Lim.

== Career record ==
Sinnaeve once managed to reach number four in the world rankings, and his best performance in a major tournament was reaching the final of the Winmau World Masters in 1986 – an event in which he competed each year between 1979 and 1991. Internationally, he was part of the Canadian WDF World Cup winning team of 1989 – the only time they have taken the team event title. Sinnaeve finished as Runner-Up in the 1986 Butlins Grand Masters, the 1987 World Cup Singles and the 1988 MFI World Matchplay, victim to Eric Bristow each time. He was also runner-up to John Lowe in the Canadian Open in 1986. He reached the semi-finals of this event in 1990 and further semi-final places in the 1987 Denmark Open and 1988 North American Open.

He received recognition as one of Canada's greatest ever players, winning a record five national titles (1979, 1983, 1986, 1987 & 1991) – a record which stood until John Part equalled it in 2007. He also won the Ontario Singles five times (1978, 1980, 1983, 1984 & 1987) and four All-Canada Cup singles titles (1985, 1986, 1987 & 1988). Sinnaeve was Canada's number one ranked player between 1981 and 1992.

He retired from competitive darts in 1992, and was inducted into the Canadian Darts Hall of Fame in 2002.

Recently, he has teamed up with American Larry Butler and is once again playing darts in North America.

== World Championship results ==
=== BDO ===
- 1982: 1st Round (lost to Alan Evans 1–2) (sets)
- 1984: 1st Round (lost to Dave Whitcombe 0–2)
- 1985: 1st Round (lost to Willy Logie 1–2)
- 1986: 1st Round (lost to Alan Glazier 1–3)
- 1987: 2nd Round (lost to Alan Evans 0–3)
- 1988: 2nd Round (lost to Dennis Hickling 0–3)
- 1989: 1st Round (lost to Dave Whitcombe 0–3)
- 1990: 1st Round (lost to Leo Laurens 2–3)
- 1991: 2nd Round (lost to Dennis Priestley 0–3)
- 1992: 1st Round (lost to Paul Lim 1–3)

=== BDO major finals: 3 (3 runners-up) ===
Outcome	No.	Year	Championship	Opponent in the final	Score (Note: (l) = score in legs, (s) = score in sets.)
Runner-up	1.	1986	Winmau World Masters	(England) Bob Anderson	2–3 (s)
Runner-up	2.	1986	Butlins Grand Masters	(England) Eric Bristow	3–5 (l)
Runner-up	3.	1988	MFI World Matchplay	(England) Eric Bristow	1–5 (s)

=== WDF major finals: 1 (1 runners-up) ===
Legend
World Cup (0–1)

Outcome	No.	Year	Championship	Opponent in the final	Score
Runner-up	1.	1987	World Cup Singles	(England) Eric Bristow	1–4 (l)

== Performance timeline ==
Tournament	1979	1980	1981	1982	1983	1984	1985	1986	1987	1988	1989	1990	1991	1992
BDO World Championship	Did not qualify			1R	DNQ	1R	1R	1R	2R	2R	1R	1R	2R	1R
Winmau World Masters	1R	QF	3R	DNP	3R	3R	2R	F	2R	4R	1R	DNP	4R	DNP
Butlins Grand Masters	Did not play				QF	DNP		F	Not held					
MFI World Matchplay	Not held					Did not qualify			1R	F	Not held			
News of the World	???						QF	QF	SF	SF	???		Not held	

WDF majors performances
Tournament	Event	World Cup 1983	World Cup 1985	World Cup 1987	World Cup 1989	World Cup 1991
WDF World Cup	Singles	L32	L128	RU	SF	L16
WDF World Cup	Pairs	?	?	?	L64	?
WDF World Cup	Team	QF	L16	SF	W	RR
WDF World Cup	Overall	8th	11th	RU	RU	10th

Performance Table Legend
DNP	Did not play at the event	DNQ	Did not qualify for the event	NYF	Not yet founded	#R	lost in the early rounds of the tournament (WR = Wildcard round, RR = Round robin)
QF	lost in the quarter-finals	SF	lost in the semi-finals	F	lost in the final	W	won the tournament
