= Rick Ney =

American darts player (1961–2017)

Personal information
- Full name: Richard Ney
- Nicknames: "The Hammer" "The Iceman"
- Born: May 21, 1961 Philadelphia, Pennsylvania, U.S.
- Died: April 9, 2017 (aged 55) Los Angeles, California, U.S.

Sport
- Sport: Darts
- Playing since: 1975
- Darts: 22g Hammerhead Darts
- Laterality: Right-handed

Organisation (see split in darts)
- BDO: 1980–1991

WDF major events – best performances
- World Championship: Semi Finals: 1988
- World Masters: Last 64: 1988

Other tournament wins
- Tournament: Years
- WDF World Cup Team Virginia Beach Classic Witch City Open: 1985; 1990; 1991

Richard "Rick" Ney (May 21, 1961 – April 9, 2017) was an American professional darts player who competed in the 1980s and 1990s.

== Career ==
Ney reached the final of the prestigious News of the World Darts Championship in 1986 losing to Bobby George. He made four appearances in the World Professional Darts Championship with his best result coming in 1988 when he beat Magnus Caris and Chris Johns, and then lost to Bob Anderson in the semifinals. Ney became only the third player from outside the United Kingdom to reach the last four of the World Championship in the ten-year history of the tournament.

All his World Championship defeats came at the hands of some legends of darts, including two losses to five-time world champion Eric Bristow.

Ney quit BDO in 1991.

== Death ==
Ney died in a vehicle accident on April 9, 2017.

== World Championship results ==
=== BDO ===
- 1984: 2nd round (lost to Eric Bristow 0–4) (sets)
- 1987: 2nd round (lost to Bristow 0–3)
- 1988: Semi-finals (lost to Bob Anderson 0–5)
- 1989: 2nd round (lost to Dave Whitcombe 0–3)

== Career finals ==
=== Independent major finals: 1 (1 runner-up) ===
Outcome	No.	Year	Championship	Opponent in the final	Score
Runner-up	1.	1986	News of the World Championship	(England) Bobby George	0–2 (s)
