= Magnus Caris =

Swedish darts player

Personal information
- Nickname: Poker Face
- Born: 15 November 1968 (age 57) Taby, Stockholm, Sweden
- Home town: Nacka, Stockholm, Sweden

Sport
- Sport: Darts
- Playing since: 1983
- Darts: 26g Own Brand
- Laterality: Right-handed
- Walk-on music: "Poker Face" by Lady Gaga

Organisation (see split in darts)
- BDO: 1987–2009
- PDC: 2009–2019

WDF major events – best performances
- World Championship: Semi-final: 1994
- World Masters: Semi-final: 1992

PDC premier events – best performances
- World Championship: Last 64: 2010, 2011, 2012, 2013, 2017
- UK Open: Last 64: 2016
- Grand Slam: Group Stage: 2011
- European Championship: Last 32: 2011, 2012, 2015

Other tournament wins
- Years
Benidorm Open	2012
PDC European Tour Nordic and Baltic Qualifier	2017, 2018
PDC World Sweden Qualifying Event	2009, 2010
SDC European Championship Qualifier	2015
Sweden National Championships	2009, 2010
SDC Pro Tour
SDC Denmark	2013
SDC Russia	2015
SDC Sweden	2012, 2013, 2016

Magnus Caris (born 15 November 1968) is a Swedish former professional darts player who competed in British Darts Organisation (BDO), World Seniors Darts (WSD) and Professional Darts Corporation (PDC) events.

== BDO career ==
Caris made seven BDO World Darts Championship appearances, his first coming in 1988, losing in the first round to Rick Ney of the United States. In 1990, he reached the quarter-finals, beating Antero Rantala and Brian Cairns before losing to Eric Bristow.

He is famous for his semi final match in the 1994 BDO World Darts Championship against crowd favourite Bobby George. He defeated Wayne Weening, Leo Laurens and Martin Adams to set up a match with George who was struggling with a very bad back following his quarter final win over Kevin Kenny. Caris lost the first 2 sets against George, but then won the next 4 sets and went 2 legs up in the seventh set. In the third leg of the seventh set, Caris had one dart at double 18 to win the match with a 141 checkout. Following this, George won 9 legs in a row and prevailed 5–4 in sets.

Caris also played in the Winmau World Masters five times, with his best performance coming in 1992, reaching the semi-finals with wins over John Lowe, Bristow and Martin Adams before losing to Mike Gregory. Caris returned to televised darts at the 2009 World Masters, losing to defending champion Martin Adams in the last 16.

== PDC career ==
At the end of 2009, Caris competed in the 2010 PDC World Championship. He whitewashed Spain's Francisco Ruiz in the preliminary round before losing to Colin Lloyd in the first round.

In December 2010, Caris competed for Sweden in the inaugural PDC World Cup of Darts alongside Par Riihonen. Sweden beat Slovenia by 6 legs to 2 in the first round, but were defeated 6–4 by United States in the second round.

At the end of 2010, Caris qualified again for the 2011 PDC World Championship. He beat Austria's Dietmar Burger in the preliminary round 4–3, surviving several match darts against him, before losing to Mervyn King in the first round.

At the start of 2011, Caris competed in the PDC qualifying school and earned his 2011 PDC tour card by getting the semi-final on the second day of qualifying.

Caris qualified for the 2011 UK Open and beat Kevin McDine in the first round. In the second round he was drawn against Peter Hudson and took a 3–0 lead before Hudson hit back to force a deciding leg, which Hudson won with a ten-darter. Caris also missed eight match darts including a bullseye for a 164 finish in the sixth leg.

Caris qualified for the 2011 Grand Slam of Darts after reaching the final of the Wildcard qualifier. He finished 3rd in his group with one victory and two defeats.

At the 2012 World Championship he let a 2–0 lead slip against Steve Beaton in the first round. Caris had three darts to wrap up a straight sets victory, but seemingly let the boisterous crowd get to him, and eventually lost the match, 2–3. He represented Sweden with Dennis Nilsson once again in the 2012 PDC World Cup of Darts and together they were beaten 1–3 by Belgium in the second round, having defeated Japan in round 1. In June, Caris earned a place in the European Tour Event 2 in Berlin by defeating Roger Palmen and Christian Gödl in the European Qualifier. In the first round he lost to Terry Jenkins 3–6. He also qualified for the third European Tour Event with a win over Mareno Michels, but was then beaten by James Wade 3–6 in the first round in Düsseldorf. At the European Championship, Caris lost in the first round to Phil Taylor 3–6 with an average of 90.

Caris finished 2012 sixth on the European Order of Merit which qualified him for the 2013 World Championship, as he took the second of four spots that were available for the highest non-qualified players. He played Robert Thornton in the first round and lost 0–3 in sets, winning just a single leg during the match. He was ranked world number 44 after the tournament. Caris played in his third World Cup of Darts and second with Par Riihonen in February 2013, but they finished bottom of Group C, losing to Canada 4–5 and Scotland 2–5.

Caris produced a very good run in the fourth UK Open Qualifier of the year by reaching the quarter-finals, beating Simon Whitlock and Andy Smith, before losing to Jamie Caven. He lost 5–1 to Kirk Shepherd in the second round of the UK Open itself. He won two events on the Scandinavian Pro Tour during the year to finish third on their Order of Merit.

In March 2014, Caris reached the semi-finals of the fourth Players Championship, only the second time he has done so in his PDC career. He beat Nigel Heydon, Peter Hudson, Justin Pipe, Adam Hunt and Stephen Bunting, before losing 6–4 to Ian White. In the World Cup of Darts, Caris and his playing partner Peter Sajwani lost both their singles games in the second round against Scotland's Peter Wright and Robert Thornton to exit the tournament. Caris lost in the final of the European Championship Qualifier 6–4 to Robert Wagner.

Caris claimed a new two-year PDC Tour Card in January 2015 by coming through the fourth day of Q School. He began the year brightly by reaching the quarter-finals of the first Players Championship event, losing 6–5 to James Wade. Caris lost in two finals on the Scandinavian Pro Tour, but won the first Russian event with a 6–3 victory over Per Laursen. He also took the SDC qualifier for the European Championship, where he was eliminated 6–2 by Simon Whitlock in the opening round.

Caris lost in the final of two Scandinavian Tour events in the early part of 2016. He reached the third round of the UK Open for the first time and lost 9–4 to John Henderson. Caris and Daniel Larsson were defeated 5–2 by Denmark in the first round of the World Cup. He won the final Scandinavian Tour event of the year by seeing off Cor Dekker 6–4. In the first round of the 2017 World Championship, Caris missed one set dart to level his first round match with Adrian Lewis at 1–1 and was beaten 3–0.

At the 2017 Gibraltar Darts Trophy, Caris overcame Dyson Parody 6–1, Jelle Klaasen 6–3 and Benito van de Pas 6–2 to reach his first European Tour quarter-final and he was beaten 6–3 by Mensur Suljović.

He announced his intention to retire from professional darts after the 2019 World Cup of Darts.

On 08/06/19 he played his final match as a professional darts player at the 2019 World Cup of Darts where he lost his match 4–0 to Gary Anderson. His partner then went on to lose meaning his team lost 2–0 to Team Scotland, Peter Wright and Gary Anderson. Following this match he officially retired from darts.

== World Championship results ==
=== BDO ===
- 1988: First round (lost to Rick Ney 1–3)
- 1989: Second round (lost to Mike Gregory 0–3)
- 1990: Quarter-finals (lost to Eric Bristow 1–4)
- 1991: First round (lost to Dennis Priestley 0–3)
- 1992: First round (lost to Phil Taylor 1–3)
- 1994: Semi-finals (lost to Bobby George 4–5)
- 1995: First round (lost to Kevin Painter 2–3)

=== PDC ===
- 2010: First round (lost to Colin Lloyd 1–3)
- 2011: First round (lost to Mervyn King 0–3)
- 2012: First round (lost to Steve Beaton 2–3)
- 2013: First round (lost to Robert Thornton 0–3)
- 2017: First round (lost to Adrian Lewis 0–3)

== Performance timeline ==
Tournament	1986	1987	1988	1989	1990	1991	1992	1993	1994	1995	1996	1997	1998	1999	2000	2001	2002	2003	2004	2005	2006	2007	2008	2009	2010	2011	2012	2013	2014	2015	2016	2017
BDO World Championship	DNQ		1R	2R	QF	1R	1R	DNQ	SF	1R	DNP			DNQ	DNP									DNQ		No longer a BDO Member						
Winmau World Masters	1R	3R	4R	QF	3R	1R	SF	1R	DNP	1R	DNP			1R	DNP								2R	6R	No longer a BDO Member							
News of the World	DNP		QF	DNP		Not held						DNP	Not held																			
PDC World Championship	NYF								Non-PDC																1R	1R	1R	1R	DNQ			1R
UK Open	Not held																	DNP								2R	DNQ	2R	DNQ		3R	DNP
Grand Slam of Darts	Not held																					DNP				RR	DNP					
European Championship	Not held																						DNP			1R	1R	DNQ		1R	DNQ	

Performance Table Legend
W	Won the tournament	F	Finalist	SF	Semifinalist	QF	Quarterfinalist	#R; RR; Prel.	Lost in # round Round-robin; Preliminary round	DQ	Disqualified
DNQ	Did not qualify	DNP	Did not participate	WD	Withdrew	NH	Tournament not held	#R; RR; Prel.	Lost in # round Round-robin; Preliminary round	NYF	Not yet founded
