= Ray Kippari =

Canadian darts player

Personal information
- Born: Finland
- Home town: Canada

Sport
- Sport: Darts
- Playing since: 1970
- Darts: 22g
- Laterality: Right-handed

Organisation (see split in darts)
- BDO: 1977–1983

WDF major events – best performances
- World Championship: Last 32: 1982
- World Masters: Last 64: 1977

Other tournament wins
- Tournament: Years
- Canadian Masters: 1978

Ray Kippari is a Canadian former professional darts player who competed in the 1970s and 1980s.

Kippari competed in the 1982 BDO World Darts Championship but was defeated by Nicky Virachkul in the first round. Kippari won the 1978 Canadian Masters, beating Allan Hogg.

== World Championship results ==
=== BDO ===
- 1982: Last 32: (lost to Nicky Virachkul 0–2) (sets)
