= Brian Netherton =

English darts player

Personal information
- Full name: Brian Netherton
- Born: 27 January 1942 Cornwall, England
- Died: 16 September 2011 (aged 69) Par, Cornwall, England
- Home town: Par, Cornwall, England

Sport
- Sport: Darts
- Playing since: 1964
- Darts: 26g
- Laterality: Right-handed

Organisation (see split in darts)
- BDO: 1973–1975

Other tournament wins
- Years
News of the World Darts Ch'ship	1972
Swedish Open	1972

Brian Netherton (27 January 1942 – 16 September 2011) was an English professional darts player.

== Career ==
Netherton was a Cornish darts player who first came to prominence when he won the News of the World Darts Championship in 1972 at the Alexandra Palace in London. This was the first year in which the tournament was televised in the UK, by ITV. Netherton represented the Welcome Home Inn from Par in Cornwall. He defeated John Walker in the semi-finals before triumphing over Welshman Alan Evans 2–0 in the final.

Netherton also won the Swedish Open in 1972, defeating Swede Ingemar Bjorling 2–1 in the final. He never played in the World Championship but continued to play in his native Cornwall.

== Career finals ==
=== Independent major finals: 1 (1 title) ===
Outcome	No.	Year	Championship	Opponent in the final	Score
Winner	1.	1972	News of the World Championship	(Wales) Alan Evans	2–0 (l)
