= Paul Gosling =

English darts player

Personal information
- Nickname: "Machine Gun"
- Born: 25 April 1948 (age 78) Truro, England
- Home town: Truro, England

Sport
- Sport: Darts
- Playing since: 1968
- Darts: 25g
- Laterality: Right-handed
- Walk-on music: "Pretty Vacant" by Sex Pistols

Organisation (see split in darts)
- BDO: 1974–1982
- WDF: 1974–1982

WDF major events – best performances
- World Championship: Last 24: 1980
- World Masters: Quarter Finals: 1979

Other tournament wins
- Tournament: Years
- British Internationals: 1979

Paul Gosling (born 25 April 1948) is an English former professional darts player who played in the 1970s and 1980s.

== Darts career ==
At the age of 20 in October 1968, Gosling, of Truro, became Cornwall's individual darts champion. Next, in April 1969, Gosling lost 0–2 in the final of the News of the World Darts Championship to Barry Twomlow in front of an audience of 10,000. At the age of 25 in April 1974, the cheroot-puffing Gosling again reached the final of the News of the World Darts Championship, but this time lost 1–2 to Peter Chapman in front of an audience of 17,000.

Gosling scored a comeback victory against darts world #1 John Lowe in April 1979, during the fourth round of the Cameron's individual tournament, with Lowe responding that he "would have been proud of that 156" thrown by Gosling in the final game, with Gosling showing the "depth of talent" in English darts. Gosling was later eliminated from the Cameron's tournament in the semi-finals by Alan Glazier in May 1979. In September 1979, Gosling was chosen as a reserve for the four-man English darts World Cup team. Gosling won the Marlboro-Sun individual darts tournament in November 1979, earning him £2,000; he was offered a further £2,000 if he could beat John Lowe in a rematch, but this time Gosling lost 1–2. By that month, Gosling had garnered the nickname "Machine Gun".

In early February 1980, Gosling failed to qualify for the 1980 BDO World Darts Championship when he lost to Cliff Lazarenko 0–2. In mid-February 1980, Gosling represented the English darts team as they beat the Scottish darts team 12–3; with Gosling defeating Eddie MacArthur 3–2 and flashing a V sign which infuriated the Dundee audience. Gosling apologised for the V sign, which his team manager said had been directed at his opponent for mouthing off, and not the audience. English darts officials responded by giving Gosling a suspended three-month international ban. In early November 1980, Gosling failed to defend his Marlboro-Sun individual darts title when he lost to Les Metrovich. Later that month, Gosling won the first Cornwall darts pentathlon event.

Gosling competed in the January 1981 BDO World Darts Championship but lost in the first round to second seed Tony Brown. In May 1984, Gosling helped Cornwall win promotion in the local darts league by defeating the team of Powys. By August 1984, Gosling was no longer representing England in darts, and he took a break from representing Cornwall as well. By 1987, Gosling had retired from professional darts.
