= Lars Erik Karlsson =

Swedish darts player

Personal information
- Born: 28 October 1964 (age 61) Ludvika, Sweden
- Home town: Stockholm, Sweden

Sport
- Sport: Darts
- Playing since: 1980
- Darts: 24g
- Laterality: Right-handed
- Walk-on music: "Welcome to the Jungle" by Guns N' Roses

Organisation (see split in darts)
- BDO: 1984–1990

WDF major events – best performances
- World Championship: Quarter-finals: 1987
- World Masters: Last 16: 1987

Other tournament wins
- Tournament: Years
- WDF Europe Cup Pairs Swedish National Championships: 1988; 1985,1990
- Updated on 7 August 2019

Lars Erik Karlsson (born 28 October 1964) is a Swedish former professional darts player who competed in the British Darts Organisation (BDO) during the 1980s and 90s.

== Career ==
Karlsson played three successive World Championships in 1987, 1988 and 1989. He reached the quarter-finals in 1987, defeating Scotland's Peter McDonald in the first round and then defeated Brian Cairns in round two before losing to defending champion Eric Bristow. In 1988, he lost 3-0 in the first round to Paul Reynolds and in 1989, he defeated Tony Payne in the first round before losing to Peter Evison in round 2.

Karlsson played in the 1988 MFI World Pairs with Mike Gregory he lose to Jocky Wilson and Ritchie Gardner.

== World Championship results ==
=== BDO ===
- 1987: Quarter-finals: (lost to Eric Bristow 1–4) (sets)
- 1988: Last 32: (lost to Paul Reynolds 0–3)
- 1989: Last 16: (lost to Peter Evison 0–3)
