= David Jones (darts player) =

Welsh darts player (1949–1995)

David-Rocky Jones
Personal information
- Full name: David Roderick Jones
- Nickname: Roxy
- Born: 5 July 1949 Rhymney, Wales
- Died: 5 October 1995 (aged 46) Rhymney, Wales

Sport
- Sport: Darts
- Playing since: 1965
- Laterality: Right-handed

Organisation (see split in darts)
- BDO: 1977 – 1988

WDF major events – best performances
- World Championship: Last 24: 1978
- World Masters: Runner Up: 1975

Other tournament wins
- Tournament: Years
- WDF World Cup Team: 1977

David Roderick Jones (5 July 1949 – 5 October 1995) was a Welsh professional darts player who played mostly during the formative years of darts television coverage during the 1970s. He was born in Rhymney, Glamorgan and although his nickname was Roxy the media got it wrong and he would often be referred to as Rocky or David Rocky Jones.

His best tournament display came in the Winmau World Masters when he reached the final in 1975 before losing to fellow countryman Alan Evans. Also during 1975 he won the Marlborough Masters and took the Unicorn World Pairs championships with Ray Phillips. He also had success in international darts with his country Wales, when they took the WDF World Cup team title in 1977.

He also appeared on television in the last darts final of Yorkshire Television's Indoor League in 1977, finishing runner-up to Tony Brown.

The World Professional Darts Championship was first organised in 1978, but despite his relative success around that time Jones never featured in the event after a single appearance in the inaugural tournament.

== World Championship Results ==
=== BDO ===
- 1978: Last 24: (lost to Conrad Daniels 4–5) (legs)

=== BDO major finals: 1 (1 runner-up) ===
| Outcome | No. | Year | Championship | Opponent in the final | Score (Note: (l) = score in legs, (s) = score in sets.) |
|---|---|---|---|---|---|
| Runner-up | 1. | 1975 | Winmau World Masters | (Wales) Alan Evans | 1–3 (s) |
