= News of the World Darts Championship =

Former English darts competition

News of the World Championship
- Founded: 1927
- Folded: 1997
- Country: England
- Venue: Various venues in London
- Last champions: Phil Taylor (ENG); Linda Jones (ENG) (1996–97)
- Tournament format: Legs

The News of the World Championship was one of the first major organised darts competitions, which began in 1927. It became England's first national darts competition from 1947, and gradually became international essentially becoming the first world darts Championship and was the hardest darts tournament to win until its demise in 1990. There was also a brief revival of the event in 1996/97, but it is now discontinued. It was organised by the National Darts Association of Great Britain (NDAGB).

Before the tournament was established, darts competitions were held in various forms around England – often as friendly matches between pubs. After World War I, pub breweries began arranging darts leagues which began to sow the seeds for the establishment of a national darts competition. The tournament was noted for using an 8 ft oche rather than the regular 7 feet 9 ¼ inches. One of these competitions was held in Hythe Street, Dartford, Kent in 1927. The competition was sponsored by a local Brewery, C.N Kidd & Sons Ltd.

== Origins ==
The tournament was first organised in the 1927/28 season thanks to the help of the staff on the News of the World newspaper and other volunteers, who helped set up the competition. William Jewiss won the 1927 darts challenge cup sponsored by News of the World and C.N Kidd & Sons brewery in Dartford.

There were around 1,000 entries in the first event, which was held in the Metropolitan area of London. The tournament then began to expand around the different counties in England. By 1938/39 there were six different regional events – London & South England, Wales, Lancashire & Cheshire, Yorkshire, the North of England and the Midland Counties.

The total entrants in the competition in 1938/39 were in excess of 280,000. Enormous interest was created that year by the London and South of England championship. A record crowd of 14,534 spectators filled the Royal Agricultural Hall, London in May to witness the final between Jim Pike (representing the Windmill Club, Southwark) and Marmaduke Brecon (Jolly Sailor, Hanworth, Middlesex). Brecon ran out the winner by two games to one. The tournament continued to attract 250,000 entries during the post war years.

There was, however no national champion of the event until after World War II. It was revived as a national competition in 1947/48, and continued to be described as "the championship every dart player wants to win" until its demise in the 1990s.

In 1979, Bobby George became the only player to win the championship without losing a leg. Stefan Lord was the only player from outside the United Kingdom to win the event.

== Demise ==
The News of the World was the first nationally televised darts event as ITV broadcast the latter stages of the championship from 1972 to 1985, and again in 1987 and 1988. The 1986 event was not broadcast due to a technicians' strike.

As quickly as darts tournaments began to appear on television throughout the 1970s and into the early and mid 1980s, the bubble burst and all darts competitions except the World Championship disappeared from TV screens in 1989.

This big sudden slump in televised darts coverage meant that it came as no surprise that the News of the World Championship also ended after the 1990 event, with the last two events having been untelevised. As it happened, 1990 was also the first year that separate competitions were held for men and women.

The lack of televised darts coverage left some players frustrated by the lack of opportunity to make a living from darts, and in January 1992 they formed their own organisation to start up their own tournaments (see main article: Professional Darts Corporation, and Split in darts).

== 1997 revival ==
The News of the World Championship made a one-year reappearance in the 1996/97 season, when Sky Sports and the News of the World resurrected the competition.

In his autobiography, Phil Taylor says that his mentor, Eric Bristow always mocked him for never having won the competition and that it was the tournament that everyone wanted to win. Bristow himself recalled his father telling him: "You're not a proper world champion until you've won the News of the World".

Taylor put the record straight by beating Ian White 2–0 in the final in June 1997, collecting the News of the World Big D Trophy, a cheque for £42,000 and a set of Unicorn golden darts. Following his victory, which also saw him take out the then England captain Martin Adams 2–1 in the semi-finals, Taylor was quoted as saying "I've won five world titles – but this one means everything".

However, the overall response to the competition was disappointing and the News of the World decided against running it again. The tournament remains discontinued, with the eponymous newspaper having closed in 2011.

== Tournament winners ==
=== Men ===
The tournament was arranged on a regional basis from 1927 until 1939. The National Championship began in 1946-47 winners and runners-up included:

Year	Champion	From	Score (legs)	Runner-up	From
1946–47	(England) Ben Gunn	Double Top Bar	2–0	(England) Harry Leadbetter	Windle Labour Club, St Helens
1947–48	(England) Harry Leadbetter	Windle Labour Club, St Helens	2–1	(England) Tommy Small	Sth Durham Steel & Iron SC, West Hartlepool
1948–49	(England) Jackie Boyce	New Southgate SC	2–1	(England) Stan Outten	Dr Johnson, Barkingside
1949–50	(England) Dixie Newberry	Albert, Hitchin	2–0	(England) Ronnie Ridley	King Edward Hotel, Newcastle-u-Tyne
1950-51	(England) Harry Perryman	Home Office SC, Greenford	2–0	(England) Laurie Runchman	Feathers, Felixstowe
1951–52	(England) Tommy Gibbons	Ivanhoe WMC, Conisbrough	2–0	(England) Jack Wallace	Low Seaton BL, Workington
1952–53	(England) Jimmy Carr	Red Lion, Dipton	2–0	(England) Ernest Greatbatch	Horse Vaults Hotel, Pontefract
1953–54	(Wales) Oliver James	Ex-Servicemen’s Club, Onllwyn	2–0	(England) Johnny Bell	The Sun, Waltham Abbey
1954–55	(England) Tom Reddington	New Inn, Stonebroom	2–0	(England) Johnny Bell	Sun, Waltham Abbey
1955–56	(England) Trevor Peachey	Black Fox, Thurston	2–0	(England) Les Campbell	Boot, Dinas
1956–57	(England) Alwyn Mullins	Traveller’s Rest, Tickhill	2–0	(Wales) Len Baker	Corporation Hotel, Cardiff
1957–58	(England) Tommy Gibbons	Ivanhoe WMC, Conisbrough	2–0	(England) Eric Moss	Railway Tavern, Harleston
1958–59	(England) Albert Welsh	Horden Hotel, Seaham	2–1	(England) Frank Whitehead	White Rose Hotel, Rossington
1959–60	(England) Tom Reddington	George Hotel, Alfreton	2–1	(Wales) Dai Jones	Cambrian Hotel, Aberystwyth
1960-61	(England) Alec Adamson	Prince of Wales, Hetton-le-Hole	2–1	(England) Eddie Brown	Magpie, Stonham
1961–62	(England) Eddie Brown	Magpie, Stonham	2–0	(England) Dennis Follett	Cadeleigh Arms, Cadeleigh
1962–63	(England) Robbie Rumney	Waterloo Hotel, Darlington	2–0	(England) Bill Harding	Globe Hotel, Aberdare
1963–64	(England) Tom Barrett	Odco SC, London	2–0	(England) Ray Hatton	Flower of the Valley Hotel, Rochdale
1964–65	(England) Tom Barrett	Odco SC, London	2–1	(England) Norman Fielding	Station Inn, Swannington
1965–66	(England) Wilf Ellis	Brookside WMC, Upton	2–1	(England) Ron Langley	Arlington SC, Harlow
1966–67	(England) Wally Seaton	Swan Inn, Parson Drove	2–0	(England) Brian Quarterman	Ivy Inn, North Littleton
1967–68	(England) Bill Duddy	Rose & Thistle, Frimley Green	2–0	(England) Gerry Feeney	Unicorn Club, Workington
1968–69	(England) Barry Twomlow	Red Lion, Chesterfield	2–0	(England) Paul Gosling	William IV, Truro
1969–70	(England) Henry Barney	The Pointer Inn, Newchurch	2–0	(England) Alan Cooper	Plough, Filton
1970-71	(England) Dennis Filkins	Barrow, Hepburn & Gale SC, Bermondsey	2–0	(England) Derek White	The Ship Inn, Weymouth
1971–72	(England) Brian Netherton	Welcome Home Inn, Par	2–0	(Wales) Alan Evans	Ferndale Hotel, Rhondda
1972–73	(England) Ivor Hodgkinson	Great Northern, Langley Mill	2–1	(England) Ron Church	Royal Alfred, Shoreditch
1973–74	(England) Peter Chapman	Bird in Hand, Henley-on-Thames	2–1	(England) Paul Gosling	Portscatho Club, Truro
1974–75	(England) Derek White	Belvedere Inn, Weymouth	2–1	(England) Bill Duddy	Frimley Green Working Mens Club, Camberley
1975–76	(England) Bill Lennard	Cotton Tree Inn, Manchester	2–0	(Wales) Leighton Rees	Ynysybwl USC, Pontypridd
1976–77	(England) Mick Norris	King of Denmark, Ramsgate	2–0	(England) Bob Crosland	Blackamoor Head, Pontefract
1977–78	(Sweden) Stefan Lord	Stockholm Super Darts Club, Stockholm	2–0	(England) John Coward	White Hart BL, Sedbergh
1978–79	(England) Bobby George	King George V, Ilford	2–0	(England) Alan Glazier	George & Dragon, Wetherby
1979–80	(Sweden) Stefan Lord	Stockholm Super Darts Club, Stockholm	2–0	(England) Dave Whitcombe	Naval Club, Chatham
1980-81	(England) John Lowe	Willow Tree, Pilsley	2–0	(England) Mick Norris	Earl St Vincent, Ramsgate
1981–82	(England) Roy Morgan	Wheel o’ Worfield, Worfield	2–1	(Wales) Jim Hughes	Parcwern Country Club, Ammanford
1982–83	(England) Eric Bristow	Foaming Quart, Norton Green	2–0	(England) Ralph Flatt	Old Red House, Carlton Colville
1983–84	(England) Eric Bristow	Foaming Quart, Norton Green	2–0	(England) Ian Robertson	Bell, Marston Moretaine
1984–85	(England) Dave Lee	Ivor Arms, Pontllanfraith	2–0	(England) Billy Dunbar	Woolwich Infant, London
1985–86	(England) Bobby George	Old Maypole, Hainault	2–0	(United States) Rick Ney	US Darting Association
1986–87	(England) Mike Gregory	Stones Cross Hotel, Midsomer Norton	2–0	(England) Peter Evison	Halcyon/Spikes, Peterborough
1987–88	(England) Mike Gregory	Stones Cross Hotel, Midsomer Norton	2–1	(England) Kevin Spiolek	Cambridge Squash Club
1988–89	(England) Dave Whitcombe	Evenhill, Littlebourne Canterbury	2–1	(England) Dennis Priestley	Horseshoe, Rotherham
1989–90	(England) Paul Cook	Gorse Hill WMC, Swindon	2–0	(England) Steve Hudson	Oakworth SC, Keighley
1996–97	(England) Phil Taylor	Cricketer’s Arms, Newcastle-under-Lyme	2–0	(England) Ian White	Dockside Inn, Runcorn

=== Women ===
Year	Champion	From	Score (legs)	Runner-up	From
1989–90	(England) Lynne Ormond	George, Alford		(England) Jane Stubbs	Roebuck Hotel, Northwich
1996–97	(England) Linda Jones	Seven Stars, Chorley	2–0	(Wales) Melanie Saunders	Railway Inn, Abergavenny

== Multiple winners ==
No player has ever won the international title three times; seven players managed two wins each.

- Tommy Gibbons (1951–52, 1957–58)
- Tom Reddington (1954–55, 1959–60)
- Tom Barrett (1963–64, 1964–65)
- Stefan Lord (1977–78, 1979–80)
- Bobby George (1978–79, 1985–86)
- Eric Bristow (1982–83, 1983–84)
- Mike Gregory (1986–87, 1987–88)

== Venues ==
- 1948–49: Empire Pool (Wembley Arena), Wembley, London
- 1950–58: Empress Hall, Earls Court, London
- 1959–62: Empire Pool (Wembley Arena), Wembley, London
- 1963–77: Alexandra Palace, London
- 1978–88: Wembley Arena, Wembley, London
- 1989–90: Docklands Arena, London
- 1997: Villa Park, Birmingham

== See also ==
- News of the World Darts Championship draws 1972-1982
- News of the World Darts Championship draws 1983-1997

== Sources ==
- Kramer, Anne (2013). The Ultimate Book of Darts: A Complete Guide to Games, Gear, Terms, and Rules. Skyhorse Publishing, Inc. ISBN 9781626365261.
- Nauright, John; Parrish, Charles (2012). Sports Around the World: History, Culture, and Practice. ABC-CLIO. ISBN 9781598843002.
