= Alan Evans =

Welsh professional darts player (1949–1999)

Personal information
- Full name: David Alan Evans
- Nickname: Evans the Arrow
- Born: 14 June 1949 Ferndale, Mid Glamorgan, Wales
- Died: 12 April 1999 (aged 49) Barry, Vale of Glamorgan, Wales

Sport
- Sport: Darts
- Walk-on music: "Delilah" by Tom Jones

Organisation (see split in darts)
- BDO: 1973–1988

WDF major events – best performances
- World Championship: Semi-final: 1979, 1987
- World Masters: Winner (1): 1975

Other tournament wins
- Tournament: Years
- British Open World Cup (Team) World Cup (Overall): 1975 1977 1977
- Updated on 1 July 2007

David Alan Evans (14 June 1949 – 12 April 1999) was a Welsh professional darts player and former World No. 1 who competed in the 1970s and 1980s.

Evans was one of the early faces of television darts and had some tournament success in the 1970s, including scoring the first televised 180 in the 1973 Indoor League semi final. By the time that darts had gained major popularity in the early 1980s, Evans's form had faded and he wasn't in the limelight as much as Eric Bristow, John Lowe and Jocky Wilson, all of whom found fame and success from the game.

== Darts career ==
Evans was one of the first players to appear on televised darts in reaching the final of the 1972 News of the World Championship, the first event to be shown in the UK, which was broadcast on ITV. In 1973 and 1974, Evans reached the final of the darts event on Yorkshire Television's The Indoor League on ITV.

Evans won the 1975 British Open, which was the first televised darts event on the BBC, and later in the year won his biggest singles tournament in winning the 1975 World Masters. At the time, the World Masters and the News of the World were the most prestigious titles in darts before the World Championship began in 1978. When the Darts World Cup began in 1977, the Welsh team of Evans, Leighton Rees and David "Rocky" Jones won the Team Championship and Overall Championship.

Evans was a participant at the inaugural Embassy World Championship in Nottingham in 1978. He defeated Alan Glazier before losing to friend and eventual champion, Leighton Rees in the quarter-finals. At the 1979 World Championship, at Jollees in Stoke-on-Trent, Evans won a very fiery quarter final match against Eric Bristow, by 3–1 in sets. In the semi-finals, Rees defeated Evans at the World Championship for the second year in succession. In May 1979, Evans received a 12-month ban from the British Darts Organisation following an incident after an international match whilst playing for the Welsh team.

After his suspension ended, Evans came back to rebuild his darts career, and made five more appearances in the World Championship, each time losing to a legend of the game – twice to Bristow in 1986 and 1987, twice to Wilson in 1982 and 1988 and also to Lowe in 1983. With the exception of the 1987 semi final loss to Bristow, these losses were all in the first or second rounds.

On a tour of Scotland, it was reported that he finished on 3 bullseyes (150) 8 times.

Evans holds the record for the highest score achieved in the charity round in the darts game show Bullseye, scoring 401 (180, 180, 41) with nine darts, doubling up to £802 for charity. This, however, was prior to the introduction of the Bronze Bully prize.

In July 1977, Evans faced boxer Muhammad Ali in an exhibition match at the Gypsy Green Stadium (South Shields), in England. Under the handicap rules of the match, Evans would only score points for hitting trebles – Ali was able to hit the bullseye to win the match and proclaim himself the Darts Champion of the World.

== Retirement and death ==
Evans began to have health problems with his kidneys in the autumn of 1987, and left the darts circuit after the MFI World Pairs event in June 1988, which was broadcast on ITV. In June 1997, Evans played darts on TV for the first time in 9 years, when he participated against his old rival, Eric Bristow, in the Battle of the Champions event at the Circus Tavern in Purfleet, broadcast on Sky Sports. Evans hit two 180s in the match, but Bristow ultimately won 3–0 in sets.

Evans died on 12 April 1999, at the age of 49 due to kidney problems. His funeral took place at the United Reformed Church in Barry. He was often mentioned in televised events by commentator Sid Waddell and usually referred to the "Alan Evans Shot" (three bullseyes) when a player required a checkout of 150.

== World Championship results ==
=== BDO ===
- 1978: Quarter-finals (lost to Leighton Rees 3–6) (legs)
- 1979: Semi-finals (lost to Leighton Rees 1–3) (sets)
- 1982: 2nd round (lost to Jocky Wilson 1–2)
- 1983: 1st round (lost to John Lowe 0–2)
- 1986: 1st round (lost to Eric Bristow 1–3)
- 1987: Semi-finals (lost to Eric Bristow 0–5)
- 1988: 2nd round (lost to Jocky Wilson 2–3)

== Career finals ==
=== BDO major finals: 1 (1 title) ===
Outcome	No.	Year	Championship	Opponent in the final	Score (Note: (l) = score in legs, (s) = score in sets.)	Ref.
Winner	1.	1975	Winmau World Masters	(Wales) David Jones	3–1 (s)	

=== Independent major finals: 1 ===
Outcome	No.	Year	Championship	Opponent in the final	Score
Runner-up	1.	1972	News of the World Championship	(England) Brian Netherton	0–2 (l)

== Performance timeline ==
Tournament	1972	1975	1976	1977	1978	1979	1980	1981	1982	1983	1984	1985	1986	1987	1988
BDO World Championship	NYF				QF	SF	DNP		2R	1R	DNP		1R	SF	2R
World Masters	NH	W	2R	3R	DNP		2R	DNP			QF	DNP	3R	1R	DNP
British Matchplay	Not held		SF	QF	SF	DNP									
British Professional	Not held							SF	2R	DNP		QF	DNP		
Butlins Grand Masters	Not held					DNP	SF	DNP	1R	DNP					
MFI World Matchplay	Not held										DNP			1R	DNP
News of the World	F	???									QF	???			

WDF majors performances
Tournament	Event	World Cup 1977	Euro Cup 1978	World Cup 1979	Euro Cup 1980	World Cup 1981	Euro Cup 1982	World Cup 1983	Euro Cup 1984	World Cup 1985	Euro Cup 1986	World Cup 1987
WDF World Cup & WDF Europe Cup	Singles	SF	L16	DNP	DNP	L64	DNP	L32	Prelim.	DNP	DNP	L64
WDF World Cup & WDF Europe Cup	Pairs	SF	SF	DNP	DNP	SF	DNP	SF	QF	DNP	DNP	?
WDF World Cup & WDF Europe Cup	Team	W	RU	DNP	DNP	QF	DNP	SF	QF	DNP	DNP	L16
WDF World Cup & WDF Europe Cup	Overall	W	3rd	DNP	DNP	6th	DNP	3rd	RU	DNP	DNP	11th

Performance Table Legend
DNP	Did not play at the event	DNQ	Did not qualify for the event	NYF	Not yet founded	#R	lost in the early rounds of the tournament (WR = Wildcard round, RR = Round robin)
QF	lost in the quarter-finals	SF	lost in the semi-finals	F	lost in the final	W	won the tournament
