= Tony Payne (darts) =

American darts player

Personal information
- Full name: Thomas Anthony Payne II
- Nickname: The Yankee Clipper
- Born: 10 April 1955 (age 71) Owensboro, Kentucky, U.S.
- Home town: Cincinnati, Ohio, U.S.

Sport
- Sport: Darts
- Playing since: 1973
- Darts: 25g Hammerhead Bottlesen
- Laterality: Right-handed
- Walk-on music: "Sweet Child o' Mine" by Guns N' Roses

Organisation (see split in darts)
- BDO: 1985–1994
- PDC: 1994–1995, 2003–2007

WDF major events – best performances
- World Championship: Last 16: 1991
- World Masters: Semi Finals: 1985

PDC premier events – best performances
- World Championship: Last 48: 2004
- World Matchplay: Last 32: 1994
- Desert Classic: Last 24 Group: 2003

Other tournament wins
- Tournament: Years
- WDF World Cup Team Lucky Lights Challenge of Champions Soft Tip Bullshooter World Championship: 1985; 1990; 1991

Thomas Anthony Payne (born April 10, 1955) is an American former professional darts player. He is also well known for publishing an article in the Bulls Eye News magazine famously titled "Thermonuclear Cricket".

== Career ==
Payne played in seven BDO World Darts Championships, but only managed to win one match in 1991, where he defeated Chris Johns, eventually losing in the second round to then World Champion Phil Taylor. All his other appearances saw him beaten in the first round where he lost to the likes of Eric Bristow (1987), Cliff Lazarenko (1988) and Bob Taylor (1994). Payne is, along with Davy Richardson and Steve West, one of three players to have lost their first five matches at the World Championship.

Despite his poor record at the world championship, Payne fared better in other BDO majors, reaching the final in the 1985 WDF World Cup Men's singles where he lost to Bristow and also reached the semi-finals of the 1985 Winmau World Masters where he lost to Northern Ireland's Ray Farrell. One of Payne's most notable career landmarks was his defeat of the former English player Steve Brown for the championship title of the 1990 Lucky Lights Challenge of Champions.

In July 1994, Payne crossed the darting divide where he was one of eleven Americans invited to play in the PDC World Matchplay. He lost in the first round to Singapore Paul Lim. After that, Payne retired from darts, preferring to spend more time with his family and newly acquired farm. However in 2003, Payne returned to the game and qualified for the Las Vegas Desert Classic, the first American darts player to qualify on live television, where he lost his opening group game to Steve Beaton but defeated Ronnie Baxter 8–1 which gave him a good chance of qualifying. However, Beaton went on to beat Baxter and win the group. Payne also played in the 2004 PDC World Darts Championship but lost in the first round to Steve Maish.

== World Championship results ==
=== BDO ===
- 1986: 1st Round (lost to Vic Hubbard 1–3) (sets)
- 1987: 1st Round (lost to Eric Bristow 0–3)
- 1988: 1st Round (lost to Cliff Lazarenko 1–3)
- 1989: 1st Round (lost to Lars Erik Karlsson 2–3)
- 1990: 1st Round (lost to Dennis Hickling 1–3)
- 1991: 2nd Round (lost to Phil Taylor 0–3)
- 1994: 1st Round (lost to Bob Taylor 0–3)

=== PDC ===
- 2004: 1st Round (lost to Steve Maish 0–3)

=== WDF major finals: 1 (1 runners-up) ===
Legend
World Cup (0–1)

Outcome	No.	Year	Championship	Opponent in the final	Score
Runner-up	1.	1985	World Cup Singles	(England) Eric Bristow	2–4 (l)
