= Bob Anderson (darts player) =

English darts player (born 1947)

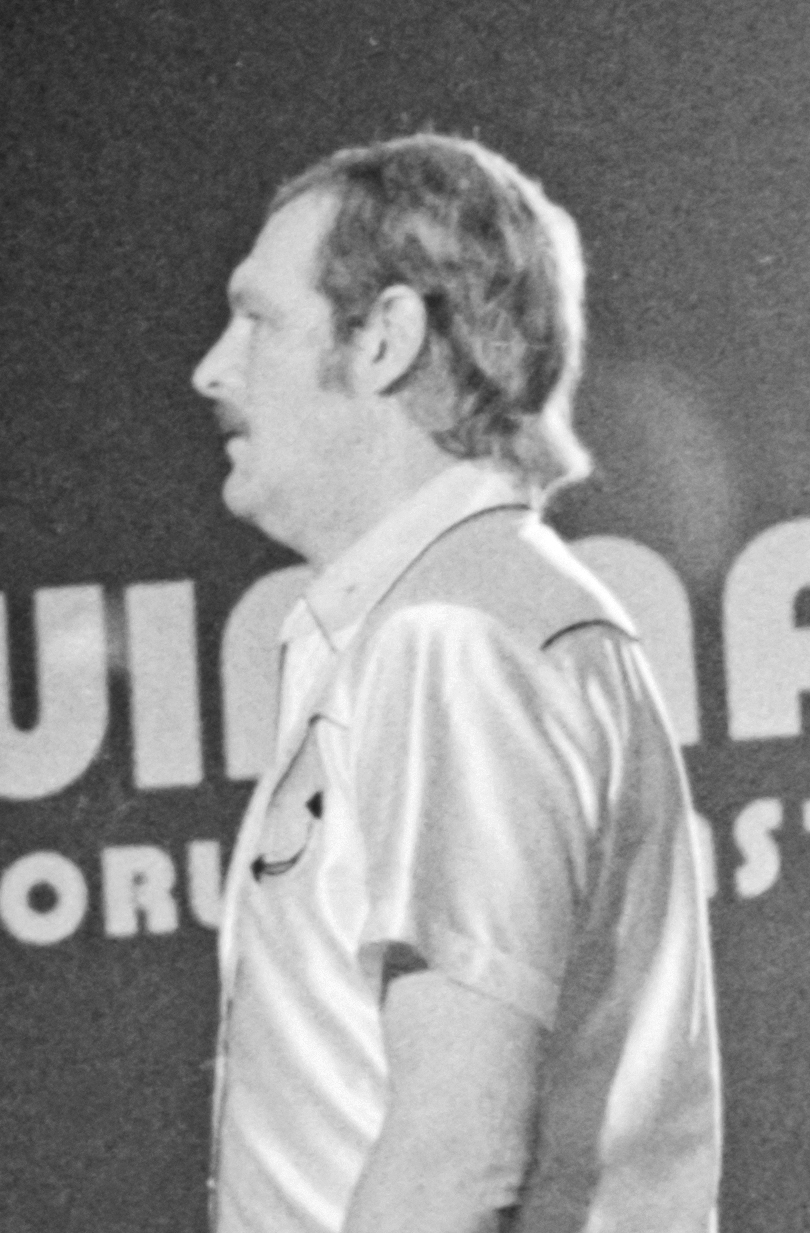
- Anderson at the 1985 World Masters

Personal information
- Full name: Robert Charles Anderson
- Nickname: "The Limestone Cowboy"
- Born: 7 November 1947 (age 78) Winchester, England
- Home town: Clevedon, England

Sport
- Sport: Darts
- Playing since: 1973
- Darts: 24g Unicorn Signature (previously 18g)
- Laterality: Right-handed
- Walk-on music: "Rhinestone Cowboy" by Glen Campbell

Organisation (see split in darts)
- BDO: 1979–1993
- PDC: 1993–2008 (Founding Member)

WDF major events – best performances
- World Championship: Winner (1): 1988
- World Masters: Winner (3): 1986, 1987, 1988
- World Trophy: Last 56: 2007

PDC premier events – best performances
- World Championship: Semi-final: 2004, 2005
- World Matchplay: 3rd Place: 1996
- World Grand Prix: Quarter-final: 2006
- UK Open: Last 16: 2006
- Desert Classic: Last 24 Group: 2003

WSDT major events – best performances
- World Championship: Last 24: 2022
- World Matchplay: Last 16: 2022
- World Masters: Last 16: 2022

Other tournament wins
- Years
British Matchplay	1988,1989
MFI World Matchplay	1987
Antwerp Open	1996
British Gold Cup	1983, 1986
British Open	1987
Canadian Open	1990, 1992
Denmark Open	1986
Dry Blackthorn Cider Masters	1989
Jersey Festival of Darts	1986
League of Legends	2008
League of Legends Event	2009
MFI World Pairs	1986
North American Open	1993
Pacific Masters	1987, 1988, 1989
PDC Samson Darts Classic	1993
PDC World Pairs	1996
Swedish Open	1986
WDF Europe Cup Pairs	1990
World Champions Challenge	1990

Robert Charles Anderson (born 7 November 1947) is an English former professional darts player who competed in British Darts Organisation and Professional Darts Corporation events. He won the 1988 BDO World Darts Championship. Nicknamed the Limestone Cowboy, he was ranked world number one for over three years in the late 1980s.

== Before darts ==
Anderson threw his first darts maximum (180) at the age of just seven, with brass darts with feather flights. He became a champion athlete during his teenage years, and was selected as a javelin thrower for the British Olympic team of 1968; however, he broke his arm before the team left for Mexico, an injury which ended his javelin-throwing career. He then turned his attention to football – playing to a moderately high standard for Lincoln United, Guildford City, Woking and Farnborough Town. During this time, he had continued to play darts socially and decided to take up the game more seriously when his injury jinx struck again – this time a broken leg in 1970 ended his football career.

== Darts success ==
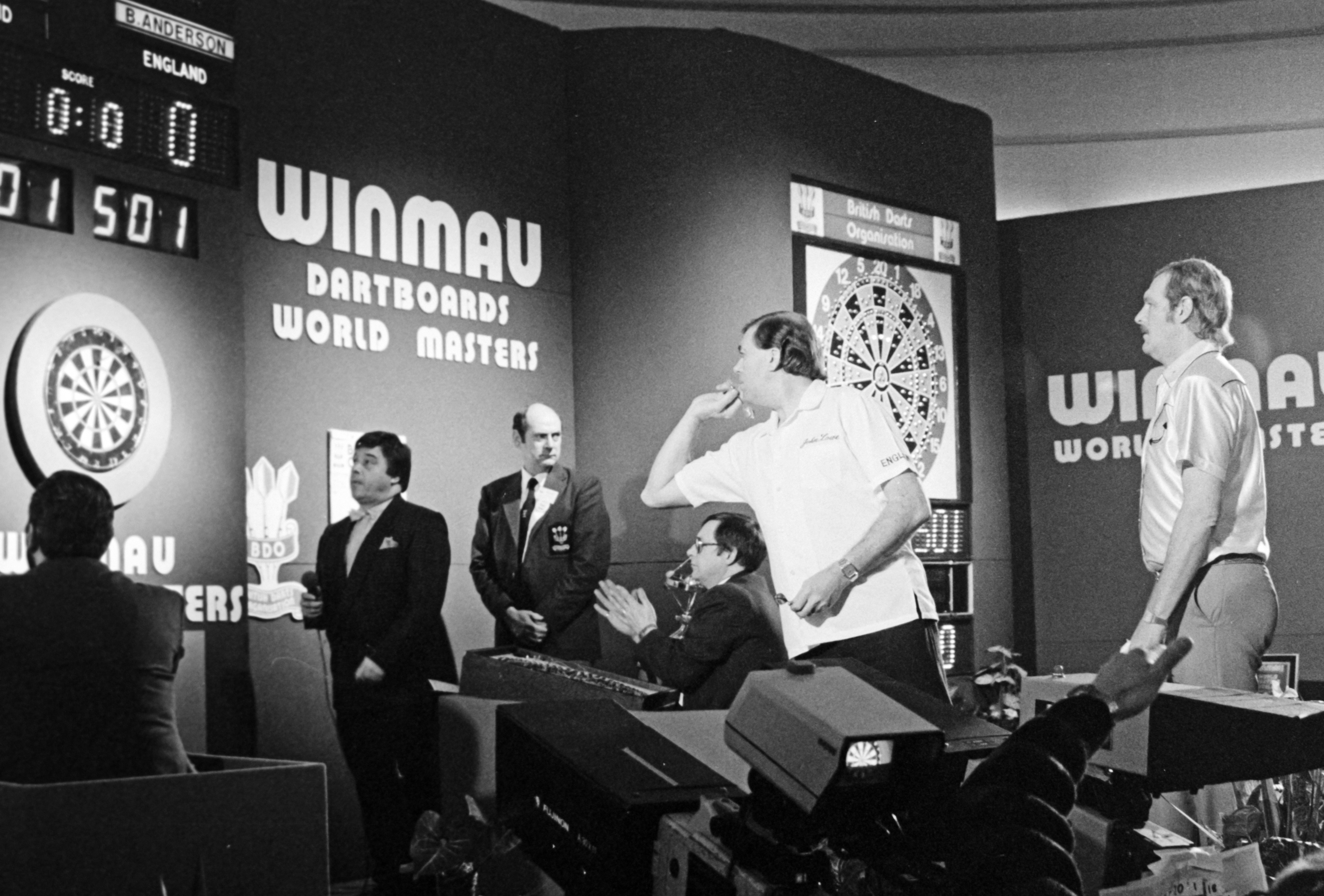
Anderson (right) v John Lowe at the Winmau World Masters 1985 quarter-final

Anderson's career peaked in 1988 when winning the World Professional Championship. He took on John Lowe in the final and won 6-4 in sets, posting a 92.7 average, and winning £16,000.

He won the Winmau World Masters in 1986, 1987 and 1988 – the first man to win the Masters in three successive years.

Two years after his world title success, Anderson underwent surgery to fix a back problem that threatened his darts career. He returned to the game professionally but never reached the same heights he had achieved in the late 80's. However, in 1992, he was chosen as the captain of England, which was one of his proudest moments in darts.

Anderson was amongst the players who formed the Professional Darts Corporation – an organisation (originally known as the World Darts Council) which separated from the existing governing body, the British Darts Organisation in 1992–93. Anderson reached the final of the Lada UK Masters, in November 1993 – losing to Mike Gregory.

In 1996, Anderson won the WDC World Pairs event alongside Phil Taylor. Anderson and Taylor defeated Chris Mason and Steve Raw in the final.

His world ranking stayed sufficiently high to earn automatic qualification for most major PDC tournaments, and he went on to reach the semi-finals of the PDC World Darts Championship in 2004 and 2005.

Anderson was also the driving force behind the Bob Anderson Classic, a major darts tournament held every October. The tournament started in 2002 and ran until 2005.

In 2008, Anderson took part in the BetFred League of Legends which was shown live on Setanta Sports, to play along with the likes of Eric Bristow, Keith Deller, John Lowe, Cliff Lazarenko, and Dave Whitcombe. Anderson went on the capture the League of Legends title in 2008, beating Keith Deller in the final.

== Outside darts ==
Bob married Sally Attwater on 8 April 2004. he chose former World Champion dart player Eric Bristow as his best man. Anderson has two children, Jennie and David. He lists his hobbies as golf, and fishing. Anderson lives in the Somerset sea-side resort town of Clevedon.

== World Championship results ==
=== BDO ===
- 1984: 1st Round (lost to Stefan Lord 0–2)
- 1985: 2nd Round (lost to Dave Whitcombe 1–3)
- 1986: Semi-Finals (lost to Dave Whitcombe 4–5)
- 1987: Quarter-Finals (lost to Alan Evans 3–4)
- 1988: Winner (beat John Lowe 6–4)
- 1989: Semi-Finals (lost to Jocky Wilson 4–5)
- 1990: 1st Round (lost to Jann Hoffmann 2–3)
- 1991: Semi-Finals (lost to Dennis Priestley 2–5)
- 1992: 2nd Round (lost to Graham Miller 2–3)
- 1993: Quarter-Finals (lost to Steve Beaton 1–4)

=== PDC ===
- 1994: Quarter-Finals (lost to Phil Taylor 2–4)
- 1995: Quarter-Finals (lost to Phil Taylor 1–4)
- 1996: Group Stage (beat Gerald Verrier 3–1) & (lost to Jamie Harvey 2–3)
- 1997: Group Stage (lost to Eric Bristow 1–3) & (beat Gary Mawson 3–1)
- 1998: Group Stage (lost to Shayne Burgess 0–3) & (beat Gerald Verrier 3–1)
- 1999: Quarter-Finals (lost to Phil Taylor 0–4)
- 2000: 1st Round (lost to Peter Manley 0–3)
- 2001: 1st Round (lost to Rod Harrington 1–3)
- 2002: 1st Round (lost to Steve Beaton 3–4)
- 2003: 2nd Round (lost to Colin Lloyd 3–4)
- 2004: Semi-Finals (lost to Kevin Painter 0–6)
- 2005: Semi-Finals (lost to Phil Taylor 2–6)
- 2006: 1st Round (lost to Andy Hamilton 2–3)
- 2007: 1st Round (lost to Darren Webster 1–3)
- 2008: 1st Round (lost to Jason Clark 2–3)

=== WSDT ===
- 2022: 1st Round (lost to Robert Thornton 0–3)
- 2023: 1st Round (lost to Andy Jenkins 0–3)

== Career finals ==
=== BDO ===
Anderson appeared in BDO major finals 10 times with a record of 7 wins and 3 runners-up.

Legend
World Championship (1–0)
World Masters (3–0)
World Matchplay (1–1)
Grand Masters (0–1)
British Matchplay (2–1)

Outcome	No.	Year	Championship	Opponent in the final	Score
Runner-up	1.	1984	Butlins Grand Masters	(England) Mike Gregory	3–5 (l)
Runner-up	2.	1985	MFI World Matchplay	(England) Eric Bristow	4–5 (s)
Winner	1.	1986	Winmau World Masters (1)	(Canada) Bob Sinnaeve	3–2 (s)
Winner	2.	1987	Winmau World Masters (2)	(England) John Lowe	3–1 (s)
Winner	3.	1987	MFI World Matchplay	(England) John Lowe	5–1 (s)
Winner	4.	1988	World Darts Championship	(England) John Lowe	6–4 (s)
Winner	5.	1988	Winmau World Masters (3)	(England) John Lowe	3–2 (s)
Winner	6.	1988	British Matchplay (1)	(England) John Lowe	3–2 (s)
Winner	7.	1989	British Matchplay (2)	(England) Cliff Lazarenko	3–0 (s)
Runner-up	3.	1990	British Matchplay	(England) Alan Warriner-Little	4–5 (s)

== Performance timeline ==
Anderson's performance timeline is as follows:

BDO

Tournament	1979	1980	1981	1982	1983	1984	1985	1986	1987	1988	1989	1990	1991	1992	1993	1994	1995	1996	1997	1998	1999	2000	2001	2002	2003	2004	2005	2006	2007
BDO World Championship	Did not participate					1R	2R	SF	QF	W	SF	1R	SF	2R	QF	Did not participate													
Winmau World Masters	3R	DNQ	2R	DNQ	QF	4R	SF	W	W	W	4R	2R	SF	2R	Did not participate														
British Matchplay	DNP					QF	DNP	QF	QF	W	W	F	QF	Did not participate							Not held								
British Professional	Not held		DNQ		2R	QF	1R	QF	1R	SF	Not held																		
Butlins Grand Masters	Did not participate					F	1R	SF	Not held																				
MFI World Matchplay	Not held					SF	F	1R	W	1R	Not held																		
World Darts Trophy	Not held																							Did not participate					RR

WDF majors performances
Tournament	Event	World Cup 1987	Euro Cup 1988	World Cup 1989	Euro Cup 1990	World Cup 1991	Euro Cup 1992
WDF World Cup & WDF Europe Cup	Singles	L32	L16	L32	L64	DNP	L64
WDF World Cup & WDF Europe Cup	Pairs	L32	QF	Prelim.	W	DNP	SF
WDF World Cup & WDF Europe Cup	Team	W	SF	SF	W	DNP	W
WDF World Cup & WDF Europe Cup	Overall	W	W	W	W	DNP	W

PDC

Tournament	1994	1995	1996	1997	1998	1999	2000	2001	2002	2003	2004	2005	2006	2007	2008
PDC World Championship	QF	QF	RR	RR	RR	QF	1R	1R	1R	2R	SF	SF	1R	1R	1R
World Matchplay	QF	1R	SF	QF	QF	2R	2R	1R	QF	2R	2R	1R	1R	1R	DNQ
World Grand Prix	Not yet founded				1R	RR	DNQ			1R	1R	1R	QF	DNQ	
Las Vegas Desert Classic	Not yet founded								DNQ	RR	1R	DNQ	1R	DNQ	
UK Open	Not held									DNQ	4R	5R	5R	3R	DNQ

Performance Table Legend
W	Won the tournament	F	Finalist	SF	Semifinalist	QF	Quarterfinalist	#R; RR; Prel.	Lost in # round Round-robin; Preliminary round	DQ	Disqualified
DNQ	Did not qualify	DNP	Did not participate	WD	Withdrew	NH	Tournament not held	#R; RR; Prel.	Lost in # round Round-robin; Preliminary round	NYF	Not yet founded
