= Chris Johns (darts player) =

Welsh darts player (born 1958)

Personal information
- Born: 10 August 1958 (age 68) Wales
- Home town: Aberdare

Sport
- Sport: Darts
- Laterality: Right-handed

Organisation (see split in darts)
- BDO: 1986-1993
- PDC: 1993 (founding member)

WDF major events – best performances
- World Championship: Last 16 1988, 1992
- World Masters: SF 1986

Other tournament wins
- Years
BDO Gold Cup	1989

Chris Johns (born 10 August 1958) is a Welsh former professional darts player.

Johns played in BDO tournaments in the late 1980s and early 1990s. In 1986, Johns beat reigning world champion Eric Bristow in the last 16 of the World Masters before losing in the semi finals to Bob Anderson. In 1989 he won the BDO Gold Cup beating Eric Bristow in the quarter finals, Jamie Harvey in the semi finals and Robbie Widdows in the final. Before his Gold Cup triumph, some in the darts world had speculated that Johns couldn't handle the pressure to win a big title. In 1993, Johns was one of 16 players to leave the BDO to join the WDC (later PDC). However, in October 1993, Johns returned to the BDO, complaining of a lack of televised WDC tournaments. "I've only been able to play in a couple of televised tournaments, which was the main reason I went to the WDC in the first place. Things haven't worked out." Johns also said "as it is I've been playing in the local leagues recently just to ensure myself of some regular practice." Although Johns returned to the BDO, he did not play in the final stages of a major event again. Little is known of his subsequent career, though it is believed he played locally in South Wales. Of the remaining 15 founding member players of the WDC, only Mike Gregory followed Johns in returning to the BDO.
