= List of darts players =

The following is a list of notable professional darts players.

| Name | Nickname | Born | Died | Country | Ref |
|---|---|---|---|---|---|
| Adam Gawlas | Flawlas | 2002 | | Czech Republic | Adam Gawlas player profile at Darts Orakel |
| Aden Kirk | Captain | 1992 | | England | Aden Kirk player profile at Darts Orakel |
| Adrian Gray | The Conqueror | 1981 | | England | |
| Adrian Lewis | Jackpot | 1985 | | England | Adrian Lewis player profile at Darts Orakel Player profile for Adrian Lewis from Dartsdatabase |
| Aileen de Graaf | | 1990 | | Netherlands | |
| Akihiro Nagakawa | | 1972 | | Japan | |
| Alan Bolton | | 1964 | | New Zealand | |
| Alan Evans | The Rhondda Legend | 1949 | 1999 | Wales | Alan Evans player profile at Darts Orakel |
| Alan Glazier | The Ton Machine | 1939 | 2020 | England | |
| Alan Norris | Chuck | 1972 | | England | Alan Norris player profile at Darts Orakel |
| Alan Soutar | Soots | 1978 | | Scotland | Alan Soutar player profile at Darts Orakel |
| Alan Tabern | The Saint | 1966 | | England | Alan Tabern player profile at Darts Orakel |
| Alan Warriner-Little | The Iceman | 1962 | | England | Alan Warriner-Little player profile at Darts Orakel |
| Aleksandr Oreshkin | The Nut | 1961 | | Russia | |
| Albertino Essers | The Sensation | 1969 | | Netherlands | |
| Alex Roy | Ace of Herts | 1974 | | England | |
| Allan Hogg | Big Al | 1939 | | Canada | |
| Anastasia Dobromyslova | From Russia With Love | 1984 | | Russia | |
| André Brantjes | The Quiet Man | 1958 | | Netherlands | |
| Andree Welge | | 1972 | | Germany | |
| Andrew Gilding | Goldfinger | 1970 | | England | |
| Andy Boulton | X-Factor | 1973 | | England | |
| Andy Fordham | The Viking | 1962 | 2021 | England | |
| Andy Green | | 1946 | | United States | |
| Andy Hamilton | The Hammer | 1967 | | England | |
| Andy Jenkins | Rocky | 1971 | | England | |
| Angus Ross | | 1954 | 2016 | Scotland | |
| Anne Kirk | Captain Kirk | 1951 | | Scotland | |
| Anthony Fleet | Fleety | 1965 | | Australia | |
| Anthony Forde | | 1962 | | Barbados | |
| Antonio Alcinas | The Samurai | 1979 | | Spain | |
| Aodhagan O'Neill | The Silver Fox | 1959 | | Ireland | |
| Arron Monk | Mad Monk | 1990 | | England | |
| Barrie Bates | Champagne | 1969 | | Wales | |
| Beau Greaves | Beau 'n' Arrow | 2004 | | England | |
| Benito van de Pas | Big Ben | 1993 | | Netherlands | |
| Bernd Roith | Bernie | 1959 | | Germany | |
| Bernie Smith | | 1964 | | New Zealand | |
| Bert Vlaardingerbroek | Big Bert | 1960 | | Netherlands | |
| Bill Davis | Classic | 1959 | | United States | |
| Bill Lennard | Mister Consistency | 1934 | 1996 | England | |
| Bill Steinke | The Rocket | 1947 | | Canada | |
| Bob Anderson | The Limestone Cowboy | 1947 | | England | |
| Bob Sinnaeve | | 1949 | | Canada | |
| Bob Taylor | The Bear | 1960 | | Scotland | |
| Bobby George | Bobby Dazzler | 1945 | | England | |
| Boris Krčmar | The Biggest | 1979 | | Croatia | |
| Boris Koltsov | The Viking | 1988 | | Russia | |
| Brendan Dolan | The History Maker | 1973 | | Northern Ireland | Brendan Dolan player profile at Darts Orakel Player profile for List of darts players from Dartsdatabase |
| Brian Woods | Pecker | 1966 | | England | |
| Callan Rydz | The Riot | 1998 | | England | |
| Cameron Menzies | Cammy | 1989 | | Scotland | |
| Carla Molema | | 1988 | | Netherlands | |
| Carlos Rodríguez | The Spanish Assassin | 1979 | | Spain | |
| Ceri Morgan | The Hulk | 1947 | | Wales | |
| Charles Losper | The Sensation | 1969 | | South Africa | |
| Chris Dobey | Hollywood | 1990 | | England | |
| Chris Johns | The Custard Man | 1962 | | Wales | |
| Chris Mason | Mace the Ace | 1969 | | England | |
| Christian Kist | The Lipstick | 1986 | | Netherlands | |
| Christian Perez | Ian | 1982 | | Philippines | |
| Cliff Inglis | Ticker | 1935 | 2001 | England | |
| Cliff Lazarenko | Big Cliff | 1952 | | England | |
| Co Stompé | The Matchstick | 1962 | | Netherlands | |
| Cody Harris | The Codestar | 1985 | | New Zealand | |
| Colin Lloyd | Jaws | 1973 | | England | |
| Colin McGarry | The Chief | 1965 | | Northern Ireland | |
| Colin Monk | Mad Monk | 1967 | | England | |
| Colin Osborne | Ozzy | 1975 | | England | |
| Conrad Daniels | | 1941 | | United States | |
| Corey Cadby | The King | 1995 | | Australia | |
| Cristo Reyes | The Spartan | 1987 | | Spain | |
| Damon Heta | The Heat | 1987 | | Australia | |
| Daniel Larsson | | 1981 | | Sweden | |
| Danny Noppert | The Freeze | 1990 | | Netherlands | |
| Dan Lauby | Cujo | 1960 | | United States | |
| Darin Young | Big Daddy | 1973 | | United States | |
| Darren Johnson | DJ | 1966 | | England | |
| Darren Webster | Demolition Man | 1968 | | England | |
| Darryl Fitton | The Dazzler | 1962 | | England | |
| Daryl Gurney | SuperChin | 1986 | | Northern Ireland | |
| Dave Askew | Diamond Dave | 1963 | | England | |
| Dave Chisnall | Chizzy | 1980 | | England | |
| Dave Lee | | | | England | |
| Dave Prins | The Badger | 1968 | | England | |
| Dave Whitcombe | The Force | 1954 | | England | |
| David Fatum | The Scorpion | 1968 | | United States | |
| David Jones | Roxy | 1949 | 1995 | Wales | |
| David Miller | Tiger Boy | 1961 | | United States | |
| Dawson Murschell | Awesome Dawson | 1995 | | Canada | |
| Dean Winstanley | Over The Top | 1981 | | England | |
| Denis Ovens | The Heat | 1957 | | England | |
| Dennis Harbour | The Pearl | 1961 | | England | |
| Dennis Nilsson | Ironman | | | Sweden | |
| Dennis Priestley | The Menace | 1950 | | England | |
| Dennis Smith | Smiffy | 1969 | | England | |
| Deta Hedman | The Dark Destroyer | 1959 | | England | |
| Devon Petersen | The African Warrior | 1986 | | South Africa | |
| Dick van Dijk | | 1970 | | Netherlands | |
| Dietmar Burger | Didi | 1968 | | Austria | |
| Dirk van Duijvenbode | The Titan | 1992 | | Netherlands | |
| Dimitri Van den Bergh | The Dreammaker | 1994 | | Belgium | |
| Diogo Portela | Braziliant | 1988 | | Brazil | |
| Doug McCarthy | | | | England | |
| Dylan Duo | The Rock | 1977 | | Gibraltar | |
| Dylan Slevin | Ocean's | 2002 | | Ireland | |
| Eddy Sims | Simsy | 1971 | | Australia | |
| Eric Bristow | The Crafty Cockney | 1957 | 2018 | England | |
| Eric Burden | | | | Wales | |
| Erik Clarys | The Sheriff | 1968 | | Belgium | |
| Fallon Sherrock | Queen of the Palace | 1994 | | England | |
| Finn Jensen | | | 2007 | Denmark | |
| Florian Hempel | | 1990 | | Germany | |
| Francis Hoenselaar | The Dutch Crown | 1965 | | Netherlands | |
| Fred McMullan | Robin Hood | 1955 | | Northern Ireland | |
| Gabriel Clemens | Gaga | 1983 | | Germany | |
| Garry Thompson | The Recliner | 1965 | | England | |
| Gary Anderson | The Flying Scotsman | 1970 | | Scotland | |
| Gary Mawson | The Mauler | 1963 | | United States | |
| Gary Robson | Big Robbo | 1967 | | England | |
| Geert De Vos | Foxy | 1981 | | Belgium | |
| Geoff Kime | Big Time | | | Australia | |
| Gerry Convery | The Rover | 1955 | | Canada | |
| Gerwyn Price | The Iceman | 1985 | | Wales | |
| Gian van Veen | The Giant | 2002 | | Netherlands | |
| Gino Vos | The Fox | 1990 | | Netherlands | |
| Glen Durrant | Duzza | 1970 | | England | |
| Glenn Moody | Mr Muscle | 1964 | | England | |
| Glenn Remick | | 1951 | 2009 | United States | |
| Göran Klemme | | 1964 | | Sweden | |
| Gordon Allpress | | | | New Zealand | |
| Graham Miller | | 1967 | | England | |
| Graeme Stoddart | The Shark | 1959 | | England | |
| Hannes Schnier | | 1977 | | Austria | |
| Haruki Muramatsu | Hal | | | Japan | |
| Horrie Seden | | | | Australia | |
| Ian Sarfas | | 1990 | | England | |
| Ian White | Diamond | 1970 | | England | |
| Irina Armstrong | Ice Baby | 1970 | | Russia | |
| Jack McKenna | | 1942 | | Ireland | |
| Jacko Barry | Jacko | 1975 | | Ireland | |
| James Hubbard | Hotshot | 1992 | | England | |
| James Richardson | Ruthless | 1974 | | England | |
| James Wade | The Machine | 1983 | | England | |
| James Wilson | Lethal Biscuit | 1972 | | England | |
| Jamie Caven | Jabba | 1976 | | England | |
| Jamie Harvey | Bravedart | 1955 | | Scotland | |
| Jamie Hughes | Yozza | 1986 | | England | |
| Jamie Lewis | Fireball | 1991 | | Wales | |
| Jan Dekker | Double Dekker | 1990 | | Netherlands | |
| Jann Hoffmann | | | | Denmark | |
| Jarkko Komula | Smiley | 1976 | | Finland | |
| Jason Clark | The Cockney Jock | 1969 | | Scotland | |
| Jeff Smith | The Silencer | 1975 | | Canada | |
| Jeffrey de Graaf | The Rebel | 1990 | | Netherlands | |
| Jeffrey de Zwaan | The Black Cobra | 1996 | | Netherlands | |
| Jelle Klaasen | The Cobra | 1984 | | Netherlands | |
| Jermaine Wattimena | The Machine Gun | 1988 | | Netherlands | |
| Jerry Hendriks | Electric | 1988 | | Netherlands | |
| Jim McQuillan | | | | Ireland | |
| Jim Walker | The Phoenix | 1959 | | Scotland | |
| Jim Widmayer | Wid | 1969 | | United States | |
| Jimmy Hendriks | | 1994 | | Netherlands | |
| Jocky Wilson | Jocky | 1950 | 2012 | Scotland | |
| Joe Cullen | The Rockstar | 1989 | | England | |
| Joe Murnan | Shaggy | 1983 | | England | |
| Joe Chaney | Chainsaw | 1975 | | United States | |
| Joey ten Berge | The Entertainer | 1985 | | Netherlands | |
| John Cosnett | | | | England | |
| John Henderson | Highlander | 1973 | | Scotland | |
| John Joe O'Shea | The Joker | 1975 | | Ireland | |
| John Kramer | JK | 1956 | | United States | |
| John Kuczynski | Johnny K | 1973 | | United States | |
| John Lowe | Old Stoneface | 1945 | | England | |
| Jason Lowe | | 1972 | | England | |
| John MaGowan | Mr Magoo | 1941 | | Northern Ireland | |
| John Michael | Deadly Rose | 1974 | | Greece | |
| John Part | Darth Maple | 1966 | | Canada | |
| John Walton | John Boy | 1961 | | England | |
| Jonny Clayton | The Ferret | 1974 | | Wales | |
| José Justicia | The Joker | 1989 | | Spain | |
| José Oliveira de Sousa | The Special One | 1974 | | Portugal | Jose De Sousa player profile at Darts Orakel Player profile for List of darts players from Dartsdatabase |
| Josephus Schenk | The Orange Machine | 1980 | | Netherlands | |
| Josh Payne | The Maximum | 1993 | | England | |
| Julie Gore | Ice Cube | 1958 | | Wales | |
| Justin Pipe | The Force | 1971 | | England | |
| Jyhan Artut | | 1976 | | Germany | |
| Karin Krappen | Dolphin | 1973 | | Netherlands | |
| Keane Barry | Dynamite | 2002 | | Ireland | |
| Keith Deller | The Fella | 1959 | | England | |
| Keegan Brown | The Needle | 1992 | | England | |
| Ken MacNeil | Silver Dart | 1975 | | Canada | |
| Kevin Burness | Iron Man | 1965 | | Northern Ireland | |
| Kevin Kenny | | 1961 | | England | |
| Kevin McDine | SupaMc | 1985 | | England | |
| Kevin Mullaney | | | | United States | |
| Kevin Münch | The Dragon | 1988 | | Germany | |
| Kevin Painter | The Artist | 1967 | | England | |
| Kevin Spiolek | The Speedo | 1962 | | England | |
| Kevin White | | 1938 | 2015 | Australia | |
| Kexi Heinäharju | | | | Finland | |
| Kim Huybrechts | The Hurricane | 1985 | | Belgium | Kim Huybrechts player profile at Darts Orakel Player profile for List of darts players from Dartsdatabase |
| Kim Viljanen | | 1981 | | Finland | |
| Kirk Shepherd | Martial Dartist | 1986 | | England | |
| Krzysztof Ratajski | The Polish Eagle | 1977 | | Poland | |
| Kyle Anderson | The Original | 1987 | 2021 | Australia | |
| Larry Butler | The Bald Eagle | 1957 | | United States | |
| Lars Erik Karlsson | | 1965 | | Sweden | |
| Leighton Rees | Marathon Man | 1940 | 2003 | Wales | |
| Leo Hendriks | White Wolf | 1983 | | Netherlands | |
| Leo Laurens | The Lion of Bruges | 1952 | | Belgium | |
| Leonard Gates | Soulger | 1970 | | United States | |
| Les Wallace | McDanger | 1962 | | Scotland | |
| Lionel Sams | The Lion | 1961 | | England | |
| Lisa Ashton | The Lancashire Rose | 1970 | | England | |
| Lorraine Farlam | | 1975 | | England | |
| Lourence Ilagan | The Gunner | 1978 | | Philippines | |
| Luke Humphries | Cool Hand Luke | 1995 | | England | Luke Humphries player profile at Darts Orakel Player profile for List of darts players from Dartsdatabase |
| Luke Littler | The Nuke | 2007 | | England | Luke Littler player profile at Darts Orakel Player profile for List of darts players from Dartsdatabase |
| Luke Woodhouse | Woody | 1988 | | England | |
| Jim Williams | The Quiff | 1984 | | Wales | |
| Josh Rock | Rocky | 2001 | | England | |
| Madars Razma | Latvian Razmatazz | 1988 | | Latvia | |
| Magnus Caris | Poker Face | 1968 | | Sweden | |
| Mareno Michels | The Miracle | 1984 | | Netherlands | |
| Mario Robbe | The Dutch Robot | 1973 | | Netherlands | |
| Mark Barilli | | 1973 | | Scotland | |
| Mark Dudbridge | Flash | 1973 | | England | |
| Mark Frost | Frosty the Throw Man | | | England | |
| Mark Hylton | Mile High | 1966 | | England | |
| Mark McGeeney | Gladiator | 1972 | | England | |
| Mark Stephenson | Stevo | | | England | |
| Mark Walsh | Special Brew | 1965 | | England | |
| Mark Webster | Spider | 1983 | | Wales | |
| Marko Kantele | | 1968 | | Finland | |
| Marko Pusa | | 1977 | | Finland | |
| Marshall James | Big MJ | | | Wales | |
| Martijn Kleermaker | The Dutch Giant | 1991 | | Netherlands | |
| Martin Adams | Wolfie | 1956 | | England | |
| Martin Atkins | The Assassin | 1965 | | England | |
| Martin Lukeman | Smash | 1985 | | England | |
| Martin Phillips | | 1960 | | Wales | |
| Martin Schindler | The List | 1996 | | Germany | |
| Matt Campbell | Ginja Ninja | 1989 | | Canada | |
| Matt Clark | Superman | 1968 | | England | |
| Matthew Edgar | Prime Time | 1986 | | England | |
| Max Hopp | Maximiser | 1996 | | Germany | |
| Mensur Suljović | The Gentle | 1972 | | Austria | |
| Mervyn King | The King | 1966 | | England | Mervyn King player profile at Darts Orakel Player profile for List of darts players from Dartsdatabase |
| Mickey Mansell | Clonoe Cyclone | 1973 | | Northern Ireland | Mickey Mansell player profile at Darts Orakel Player profile for List of darts players from Dartsdatabase |
| Michael Rasztovits | Rasto | 1984 | | Austria | |
| Michael Rosenauer | ROSI 501 | 1966 | | Germany | |
| Michael Smith | Bully Boy | 1990 | | England | Michael Smith player profile at Darts Orakel Player profile for List of darts players from Dartsdatabase |
| Michael Unterbuchner | T-Rex | 1988 | | Germany | |
| Michael van Gerwen | Mighty Mike | 1989 | | Netherlands | Michael van Gerwen player profile at Darts Orakel Player profile for List of darts players from Dartsdatabase |
| Michel van der Horst | | 1975 | | Netherlands | |
| Mick McGowan | The Magnet | 1973 | | Ireland | |
| Mieke de Boer | Bambie | 1980 | | Netherlands | |
| Mike De Decker | The Real Deal | 1995 | | Belgium | Mike De Decker player profile at Darts Orakel Player profile for List of darts players from Dartsdatabase |
| Mike Gregory | | 1956 | | England | |
| Mike Veitch | The Cat | 1960 | | Scotland | |
| Mikuru Suzuki | Miracle | 1982 | | Japan | |
| Miloslav Navrátil | | | | Czech Republic | |
| Mitchell Clegg | The Moosta | 1990 | | Australia | |
| Morihiro Hashimoto | The Ogre | 1977 | 2017 | Japan | |
| Nándor Bezzeg | Mighty Magyar | 1971 | | Hungary | |
| Nathan Aspinall | The Asp | 1991 | | England | Nathan Aspinall player profile at Darts Orakel Player profile for List of darts players from Dartsdatabase |
| Nicky Virachkul | | 1948 | 1999 | United States | |
| Niels de Ruiter | The Excellent Dude | 1983 | | Netherlands | |
| Nigel Heydon | Undertaker | 1970 | | England | |
| Norman Madhoo | Stormin Norm | 1964 | | Guyana | |
| Oliver Ferenc | | 1969 | | Serbia | |
| Owen Thomas | | | | Wales | |
| Oyvind Aasland | | | | Norway | |
| Pat Orreal | Choppa | 1964 | | Australia | |
| Paul Gosling | | | | England | |
| Paul Hanvidge | Polly Boy | 1961 | | Scotland | |
| Paul Hogan | Crocodile Dundee | 1963 | | England | |
| Paul Jennings | Jenno | 1976 | | England | |
| Paul Lim | The Singapore Slinger | 1954 | | SingaporeUnited States | Paul Lim player profile at Darts Orakel Player profile for List of darts players from Dartsdatabase |
| Paul Nicholson | The Asset | 1979 | | Australia | |
| Per Laursen | Peachie | 1966 | | Denmark | |
| Peter Evison | The Fen Tiger | 1964 | | England | |
| Peter Hunt | | | | New Zealand | |
| Peter Locke | | | | Wales | |
| Peter Manley | One Dart | 1962 | | England | |
| Peter Masson | | 1945 | 2010 | Scotland | |
| Peter Wright | Snakebite | 1970 | | Scotland | Peter Wright player profile at Darts Orakel Player profile for List of darts players from Dartsdatabase |
| Petri Korte | Popeye | | | Finland | |
| Phil Gilman | | | | England | |
| Phil Taylor | The Power | 1960 | | England | Phil Taylor player profile at Darts Orakel Player profile for List of darts players from Dartsdatabase |
| Phill Nixon | The Ferryhill Flyer | 1956 | 2013 | England | |
| Phillip Hazel | | 1956 | | New Zealand | |
| Preston Ridd | Bing | 1953 | | New Zealand | |
| Rab Scott | Mr Golden Darts | 1948 | | England | |
| Rab Smith | | 1950 | | Scotland | |
| Ray Kippari | | | | Canada | |
| Raymond van Barneveld | Barney | 1967 | | Netherlands | Raymond van Barneveld player profile at Darts Orakel Player profile for List of darts players from Dartsdatabase |
| Remco van Eijden | | 1977 | | Netherlands | |
| René Eidams | The Cube | 1989 | | Germany | |
| Rhian Edwards | | 1981 | | Wales | |
| Ricardo Pietreczko | Pikachu | 1994 | | Germany | |
| Richard North | The Lionheart | 1990 | | England | |
| Richie Burnett | The Prince of Wales | 1967 | | Wales | Richie Burnett player profile at Darts Orakel Player profile for List of darts players from Dartsdatabase |
| Ritchie Edhouse | Madhouse | 1983 | | England | |
| Richie Gardner | | | | England | |
| Richie George | Richie Rich | 1989 | | England | |
| Rick Hofstra | | 1977 | | Netherlands | |
| Rick Ney | | 1961 | | United States | |
| Ricky Evans | Rapid | 1990 | | England | |
| Rico Vonck | | 1987 | | Netherlands | |
| Rilana Erades | Pebbles | 1984 | | Netherlands | |
| Rob Cross | Voltage | 1990 | | England | |
| Robbie Green | Kong | 1974 | | England | |
| Robert Hughes | Elvis | 1966 | | Wales | |
| Robert Owen | Stack Attack | 1984 | | Wales | |
| Robert Thornton | The Thorn | 1967 | | Scotland | Robert Thornton player profile at Darts Orakel Player profile for List of darts players from Dartsdatabase |
| Robert Wagner | The Magician | 1965 | | Norway | |
| Rod Harrington | The Prince of Style | 1957 | | England | |
| Roger Carter | Taz | 1961 | | United States | |
| Roland Scholten | The Flying Dutchman | 1965 | | Netherlands | |
| Ron Meulenkamp | The Bomb | 1988 | | Netherlands | |
| Ronnie Baxter | The Rocket | 1961 | | England | |
| Ronnie Davies | | | | Wales | |
| Ronnie Sharp | Pancho | | | Scotland | |
| Ronny Huybrechts | The Rebel | 1965 | | Belgium | Ronny Huybrechts player profile at Darts Orakel Player profile for List of darts players from Dartsdatabase |
| Ross Montgomery | The Boss | 1962 | | Scotland | |
| Ross Smith | Smudger | 1989 | | England | |
| Royden Lam | The Wolf | 1975 | | Hong Kong | |
| Rowby-John Rodriguez | Little John | 1994 | | Austria | |
| Ryan Joyce | Relentless | 1985 | | England | |
| Ryan Meikle | The Barber | 1996 | | England | |
| Ryan Searle | Heavy Metal | 1987 | | England | |
| Russell Stewart | Rusty | 1960 | | Australia | |
| Scott Burnett | Scotty B | 1974 | | United States | |
| Scott MacKenzie | The Alchemist | 1972 | | Hong Kong | |
| Scott Mitchell | Scotty Dog | 1970 | | England | |
| Scott Rand | Cool Hand | 1975 | | England | |
| Scott Waites | Scotty 2 Hotty | 1977 | | England | |
| Scott Williams | Shaggy | 1990 | | England | |
| Sean Palfrey | | 1968 | | Wales | |
| Shane O'Connor | Maverick | 1985 | | Ireland | |
| Shane Tichowitsch | T'n'T | 1967 | | Australia | |
| Sharon Prins | Racing Angel | 1988 | | Netherlands | |
| Shaun Greatbatch | 9 Dart | 1969 | | England | |
| Shayne Burgess | The Bulldog | 1964 | | England | |
| Simon Stevenson | The Mirror Man | 1972 | | England | |
| Simon Whitlock | The Wizard | 1969 | | Australia | Simon Whitlock player profile at Darts Orakel Player profile for List of darts players from Dartsdatabase |
| Stacy Bromberg | The Wish Granter | 1956 | | United States | |
| Stefan Lord | | 1954 | | Sweden | |
| Stefan Nagy | | 1961 | | Sweden | |
| Stephen Bunting | The Bullet | 1985 | | England | Stephen Bunting player profile at Darts Orakel Player profile for List of darts players from Dartsdatabase |
| Steve Alker | Snakeman | 1964 | | Wales | |
| Steve Beaton | The Bronzed Adonis | 1964 | | England | Steve Beaton player profile at Darts Orakel Player profile for List of darts players from Dartsdatabase |
| Steve Brennan | | 1951 | | Northern Ireland | |
| Steve Brown | Brownie | 1962 | | United States | |
| Steve Brown | Bomber | 1981 | | England | |
| Steve Coote | Magic | 1970 | | England | |
| Steve Evans | The Outlaw | 1972 | | Wales | |
| Steve Farmer | The Train | | | England | |
| Steve Grubb | Grubby | | | England | |
| Steve Hine | The Muffin Man | 1969 | | England | |
| Steve Lennon | Scuba Steve | 1993 | | Ireland | |
| Steve Maish | Mr Magic | 1963 | | England | |
| Steve West | Westy | 1975 | | England | |
| Stuart Holden | | 1955 | | England | |
| Stuart Kellett | KO | 1981 | | England | |
| Sudesh Fitzgerald | Kerry | 1980 | | Guyana | |
| Ted Evetts | Superted | 1997 | | England | |
| Ted Hankey | The Count | 1968 | | England | |
| Terry Jenkins | The Bull | 1963 | | England | |
| Terry O'Dea | | 1945 | | Australia | |
| Tim Brown | Brownie | 1944 | | Australia | |
| Tom Kirby | | 1947 | 2008 | Ireland | |
| Tom Sawyer | Todays | 1969 | | United States | |
| Tomas Seyler | Shorty | 1974 | | Germany | |
| Tony Ayres | T-Man | 1967 | | England | |
| Tony Brown | | 1945 | 2022 | England | |
| Tony Clark | | 1955 | | Wales | |
| Tony David | The Deadly Boomerang | 1967 | | Australia | |
| Tony Eccles | The Viper | 1970 | | England | |
| Tony Holyoake | The Project | 1946 | | Canada | |
| Tony Martin | Spud | 1981 | | England | |
| Tony O'Shea | Silverback | 1961 | | England | |
| Tony Payne | The Yankee Clipper | 1958 | | United States | |
| Tony Ridler | | 1954 | 2015 | Wales | |
| Tony Skuse | | 1955 | | Wales | |
| Tony Sontag | | 1956 | 2018 | England | |
| Tony West | The Tornado | 1972 | | England | |
| Toon Greebe | | 1988 | 2023 | Netherlands | |
| Trevor Nurse | | 1953 | 2016 | Scotland | |
| Tricia Wright | The Wright Stuff | 1959 | | England | |
| Trina Gulliver | The Golden Girl | 1969 | | England | |
| Tytus Kanik | Tyto | 1984 | | Poland | |
| Ulf Ceder | | 1974 | | Finland | |
| Vincent van der Voort | The Dutch Destroyer | 1975 | | Netherlands | |
| Vladimir Andersen | Valle | 1989 | | Denmark | |
| Warren French | Frog | 1963 | | New Zealand | |
| Warren Parry | Wazza | 1964 | | New Zealand | |
| Wayne Atwood | Celtic Warrior | 1964 | | Wales | |
| Wayne Jones | The Wanderer | 1965 | | England | |
| Wayne Lock | Lock Shot | 1957 | | Wales | |
| Wayne Mardle | Hawaii 501 | 1973 | | England | |
| Wayne Warren | Yank | 1962 | | Wales | |
| Wayne Weening | | 1965 | | Australia | |
| Wes Newton | The Warrior | 1977 | | England | |
| Wesley Harms | Sparky | 1984 | | Netherlands | |
| William O'Connor | Magpie | 1986 | | Ireland | |
| Willy Logie | | 1952 | | Belgium | |
| Willy van de Wiel | Free Willy | 1982 | | Netherlands | |
| Willard Bruguier | Willie J | 1981 | | United States | |
| Wynand Havenga | The Springbok | 1965 | | South Africa | |
| Zoran Lerchbacher | The Hypercane | 1972 | | Austria | |

== See also ==
- List of darts players who have switched organisation
- PDC Order of Merit
- Nine-dart finish
