= World Professional Darts Championship =

Championship previously referred to as The Embassy

The World Professional Darts Championship is the most important tournament in the darts calendar. Originally held as an annual event between 1978 and 1993, players then broke off into two separate organisations after a controversial split in the game. Each organisation, the British Darts Organisation (BDO) and the Professional Darts Corporation (PDC) then arranged their own World Championships, the former in January the latter in December. As a result, there was no longer a unified world champion in the sport for nearly three decades.

The BDO version dated back to 1978, when it was held at the Heart of the Midlands nightclub, Nottingham. The following year it moved to the Jollees Cabaret Club, Stoke, where it stayed until 1985. From then until 2019 it was held at the Lakeside Leisure Complex at Frimley Green, Surrey. In 2020 the tournament was held at The O2 Arena in London. The BDO went into liquidation in 2020 and the World Darts Federation announced later that they would be creating their own version of a World Championship, returning to the Lakeside Leisure Complex. Due to the COVID-19 pandemic, their version didn't get underway until 2022. Since qualification for the BDO version was always based on WDF rankings, most of the player pool and legacy of this new version of the World Championship is based on the old BDO system.

The PDC version has been running since 1994 after "the split", with a field of players containing all active previous World Champions from the BDO. It was originally staged at Purfleet's Circus Tavern, Essex, before moving to its current home Alexandra Palace, London, for the 2008 World Championship.

== Men's winners ==
World Darts Council / Professional Darts Corporation		British Darts Organisation		World Darts Federation	
Year	Champion	Year	Champion	Year	Champion
1978	Not yet founded	1978	(Wales) Leighton Rees (1/1) def. (England) John Lowe, 11–7 (legs)	1978	Not yet founded
1979	Not yet founded	1979	(England) John Lowe (1/3) def. (Wales) Leighton Rees, 5–0	1979	Not yet founded
1980	Not yet founded	1980	(England) Eric Bristow (1/5) def. (England) Bobby George, 5–3	1980	Not yet founded
1981	Not yet founded	1981	(England) Eric Bristow (2/5) def. (England) John Lowe, 5–3	1981	Not yet founded
1982	Not yet founded	1982	(Scotland) Jocky Wilson (1/2) def. (England) John Lowe, 5–3	1982	Not yet founded
1983	Not yet founded	1983	(England) Keith Deller (1/1) def. (England) Eric Bristow, 6–5	1983	Not yet founded
1984	Not yet founded	1984	(England) Eric Bristow (3/5) def. (England) Dave Whitcombe, 7–1	1984	Not yet founded
1985	Not yet founded	1985	(England) Eric Bristow (4/5) def. (England) John Lowe, 6–2	1985	Not yet founded
1986	Not yet founded	1986	(England) Eric Bristow (5/5) def. (England) Dave Whitcombe, 6–0	1986	Not yet founded
1987	Not yet founded	1987	(England) John Lowe (2/3) def. (England) Eric Bristow, 6–4	1987	Not yet founded
1988	Not yet founded	1988	(England) Bob Anderson (1/1) def. (England) John Lowe, 6–4	1988	Not yet founded
1989	Not yet founded	1989	(Scotland) Jocky Wilson (2/2) def. (England) Eric Bristow, 6–4	1989	Not yet founded
1990	Not yet founded	1990	(England) Phil Taylor (1/16) def. (England) Eric Bristow, 6–1	1990	Not yet founded
1991	Not yet founded	1991	(England) Dennis Priestley (1/2) def. (England) Eric Bristow, 6–0	1991	Not yet founded
1992	Not yet founded	1992	(England) Phil Taylor (2/16) def. (England) Mike Gregory, 6–5	1992	Not yet founded
1993	Not yet founded	1993	(England) John Lowe (3/3) def. (England) Alan Warriner, 6–3	1993	Not yet founded
1994	(England) Dennis Priestley (2/2) def. (England) Phil Taylor, 6–1	1994	(Canada) John Part (1/3) def. (England) Bobby George, 6–0	1994	Not yet founded
1995	(England) Phil Taylor (3/16) def. (England) Rod Harrington, 6–2	1995	(Wales) Richie Burnett (1/1) def. (Netherlands) Raymond van Barneveld, 6–3	1995	Not yet founded
1996	(England) Phil Taylor (4/16) def. (England) Dennis Priestley, 6–4	1996	(England) Steve Beaton (1/1) def. (Wales) Richie Burnett, 6–3	1996	Not yet founded
1997	(England) Phil Taylor (5/16) def. (England) Dennis Priestley, 6–3	1997	(Scotland) Les Wallace (1/1) def. (Wales) Marshall James, 6–3	1997	Not yet founded
1998	(England) Phil Taylor (6/16) def. (England) Dennis Priestley, 6–0	1998	(Netherlands) Raymond van Barneveld (1/5) def. (Wales) Richie Burnett, 6–5	1998	Not yet founded
1999	(England) Phil Taylor (7/16) def. (England) Peter Manley, 6–2	1999	(Netherlands) Raymond van Barneveld (2/5) def. (England) Ronnie Baxter, 6–5	1999	Not yet founded
2000	(England) Phil Taylor (8/16) def. (England) Dennis Priestley, 7–3	2000	(England) Ted Hankey (1/2) def. (England) Ronnie Baxter, 6–0	2000	Not yet founded
2001	(England) Phil Taylor (9/16) def. (Canada) John Part, 7–0	2001	(England) John Walton (1/1) def. (England) Ted Hankey, 6–2	2001	Not yet founded
2002	(England) Phil Taylor (10/16) def. (England) Peter Manley, 7–0	2002	(Australia) Tony David (1/1) def. (England) Mervyn King, 6–4	2002	Not yet founded
2003	(Canada) John Part (2/3) def. (England) Phil Taylor, 7–6	2003	(Netherlands) Raymond van Barneveld (3/5) def. (Wales) Ritchie Davies, 6–3	2003	Not yet founded
2004	(England) Phil Taylor (11/16) def. (England) Kevin Painter, 7–6	2004	(England) Andy Fordham (1/1) def. (England) Mervyn King, 6–3	2004	Not yet founded
2005	(England) Phil Taylor (12/16) def. (England) Mark Dudbridge, 7–4	2005	(Netherlands) Raymond van Barneveld (4/5) def. (England) Martin Adams, 6–2	2005	Not yet founded
2006	(England) Phil Taylor (13/16) def. (England) Peter Manley, 7–0	2006	(Netherlands) Jelle Klaasen (1/1) def. (Netherlands) Raymond van Barneveld, 7–5	2006	Not yet founded
2007	(Netherlands) Raymond van Barneveld (5/5) def. (England) Phil Taylor, 7–6	2007	(England) Martin Adams (1/3) def. (England) Phill Nixon, 7–6	2007	Not yet founded
2008	(Canada) John Part (3/3) def. (England) Kirk Shepherd, 7–2	2008	(Wales) Mark Webster (1/1) def. (Australia) Simon Whitlock, 7–5	2008	Not yet founded
2009	(England) Phil Taylor (14/16) def. (Netherlands) Raymond van Barneveld, 7–1	2009	(England) Ted Hankey (2/2) def. (England) Tony O'Shea, 7–6	2009	Not yet founded
2010	(England) Phil Taylor (15/16) def. (Australia) Simon Whitlock, 7–3	2010	(England) Martin Adams (2/3) def. (England) Dave Chisnall, 7–5	2010	Not yet founded
2011	(England) Adrian Lewis (1/2) def. (Scotland) Gary Anderson, 7–5	2011	(England) Martin Adams (3/3) def. (England) Dean Winstanley, 7–5	2011	Not yet founded
2012	(England) Adrian Lewis (2/2) def. (England) Andy Hamilton, 7–3	2012	(Netherlands) Christian Kist (1/1) def. (England) Tony O'Shea, 7–5	2012	Not yet founded
2013	(England) Phil Taylor (16/16) def. (Netherlands) Michael van Gerwen, 7–4	2013	(England) Scott Waites (1/2) def. (England) Tony O'Shea, 7–1	2013	Not yet founded
2014	(Netherlands) Michael van Gerwen (1/3) def. (Scotland) Peter Wright, 7–4	2014	(England) Stephen Bunting (1/1) def. (England) Alan Norris, 7–4	2014	Not yet founded
2015	(Scotland) Gary Anderson (1/2) def. (England) Phil Taylor, 7–6	2015	(England) Scott Mitchell (1/1) def. (England) Martin Adams, 7–6	2015	Not yet founded
2016	(Scotland) Gary Anderson (2/2) def. (England) Adrian Lewis, 7–5	2016	(England) Scott Waites (2/2) def. (Canada) Jeff Smith, 7–1	2016	Not yet founded
2017	(Netherlands) Michael van Gerwen (2/3) def. (Scotland) Gary Anderson, 7–3	2017	(England) Glen Durrant (1/3) def. (Netherlands) Danny Noppert, 7–3	2017	Not yet founded
2018	(England) Rob Cross (1/1) def. (England) Phil Taylor, 7–2	2018	(England) Glen Durrant (2/3) def. (England) Mark McGeeney, 7–6	2018	Not yet founded
2019	(Netherlands) Michael van Gerwen (3/3) def. (England) Michael Smith, 7–3	2019	(England) Glen Durrant (3/3) def. (England) Scott Waites, 7–3	2019	Not yet founded
2020	(Scotland) Peter Wright (1/2) def. (Netherlands) Michael van Gerwen, 7–3	2020	(Wales) Wayne Warren (1/1) def. (Wales) Jim Williams, 7–4	2020	Not yet founded
2021	(Wales) Gerwyn Price (1/1) def. (Scotland) Gary Anderson, 7–3	2021	Discontinued	2021	No competition due to the COVID-19 pandemic
2022	(Scotland) Peter Wright (2/2) def. (England) Michael Smith, 7–5	2022	Discontinued	2022	(Northern Ireland) Neil Duff (1/1) def. (France) Thibault Tricole, 6–5
2023	(England) Michael Smith (1/1) def. (Netherlands) Michael van Gerwen, 7–4	2023	Discontinued	2023	(Belgium) Andy Baetens (1/1) def. (Netherlands) Chris Landman, 6–1
2024	(England) Luke Humphries (1/1) def. (England) Luke Littler, 7–4	2024	Discontinued	2024	(Republic of Ireland) Shane McGuirk (1/1) def. (Singapore) Paul Lim, 6–3
2025	(England) Luke Littler (1/2) def. (Netherlands) Michael van Gerwen, 7–3	2025	Discontinued	2025	(Netherlands) Jimmy van Schie (1/1) def. (Scotland) Mitchell Lawrie, 6–3
2026	(England) Luke Littler (2/2) def. (Netherlands) Gian van Veen, 7–1	2026	Discontinued	2026	Not yet held

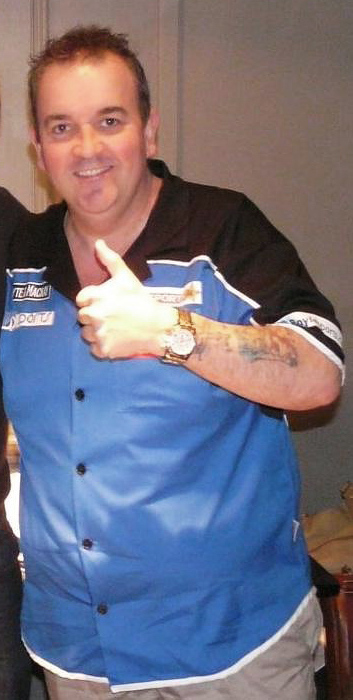
Englishman Phil Taylor has won a record sixteen World Championships.

=== By player ===
The following sortable table lists all winners of the men's world championships listed above, separated by organising body/championship (correct as of 3 January 2026).

Rank	Player	Titles	WDC/PDC	BDO	WDF	Winning years
1	(England) Phil Taylor	16	14	2	–	1990, 1992, 1995, 1996, 1997, 1998, 1999, 2000, 2001, 2002, 2004, 2005, 2006, 2009, 2010, 2013
2	(England) Eric Bristow	5	–	5	–	1980, 1981, 1984, 1985, 1986
2	(Netherlands) Raymond van Barneveld	5	1	4	–	1998, 1999, 2003, 2005, 2007
4	(England) John Lowe	3	–	3	–	1979, 1987, 1993
4	(Canada) John Part	3	2	1	–	1994, 2003, 2008
4	(England) Martin Adams	3	–	3	–	2007, 2010, 2011
4	(England) Glen Durrant	3	–	3	–	2017, 2018, 2019
4	(Netherlands) Michael van Gerwen	3	3	–	–	2014, 2017, 2019
9	(Scotland) Jocky Wilson	2	–	2	–	1982, 1989
9	(England) Dennis Priestley	2	1	1	–	1991, 1994
9	(England) Ted Hankey	2	–	2	–	2000, 2009
9	(England) Adrian Lewis	2	2	–	–	2011, 2012
9	(England) Scott Waites	2	–	2	–	2013, 2016
9	(Scotland) Gary Anderson	2	2	–	–	2015, 2016
9	(Scotland) Peter Wright	2	2	–	–	2020, 2022
9	(England) Luke Littler	2	2	–	–	2025, 2026
17	(Wales) Leighton Rees	1	–	1	–	1978
17	(England) Keith Deller	1	–	1	–	1983
17	(England) Bob Anderson	1	–	1	–	1988
17	(Wales) Richie Burnett	1	–	1	–	1995
17	(England) Steve Beaton	1	–	1	–	1996
17	(Scotland) Les Wallace	1	–	1	–	1997
17	(England) John Walton	1	–	1	–	2001
17	(Australia) Tony David	1	–	1	–	2002
17	(England) Andy Fordham	1	–	1	–	2004
17	(Netherlands) Jelle Klaasen	1	–	1	–	2006
17	(Wales) Mark Webster	1	–	1	–	2008
17	(Netherlands) Christian Kist	1	–	1	–	2012
17	(England) Stephen Bunting	1	–	1	–	2014
17	(England) Scott Mitchell	1	–	1	–	2015
17	(England) Rob Cross	1	1	–	–	2018
17	(Wales) Wayne Warren	1	–	1	–	2020
17	(Wales) Gerwyn Price	1	1	–	–	2021
17	(Northern Ireland) Neil Duff	1	–	–	1	2022
17	(England) Michael Smith	1	1	–	–	2023
17	(Belgium) Andy Baetens	1	–	–	1	2023
17	(England) Luke Humphries	1	1	–	–	2024
17	(Republic of Ireland) Shane McGuirk	1	–	–	1	2024
17	(Netherlands) Jimmy van Schie	1	–	–	1	2025

=== By country ===
The following sortable table lists all winners of the men's world championships listed above, separated by organising body/championship (correct as of 3 January 2026).

Country	Total	WDC/PDC	BDO	WDF
England	50	22	28	–
Netherlands	11	4	6	1
Scotland	7	4	3	–
Wales	5	1	4	–
Canada	3	2	1	–
Australia	1	–	1	–
Northern Ireland	1	–	–	1
Belgium	1	–	–	1
Ireland	1	–	–	1

=== Highest average progression ===
Average	Seed	Player	Score	Opponent	Stage	Year
97.49	3	(Wales) Leighton Rees	6–3	(Wales) Alan Evans	QF	1978
99.00	5	(England) John Lowe	2–0	(England) Tony Brown	1st	1984
100.29	unseeded	(England) Keith Deller	2–4	(England) John Lowe	QF	1985
100.80	unseeded	(England) Phil Taylor	5–0	(England) Cliff Lazarenko	SF	1990
102.63	1	(England) Dennis Priestley	3–0	(Scotland) Jocky Wilson	1st	1993
103.98	1	(England) Phil Taylor	6–0	(England) Dennis Priestley	F	1998
105.03	3	(England) Phil Taylor	3–0	(England) Reg Harding	1st	1999
105.87	2	(England) Phil Taylor	6–0	(England) Alan Warriner	QF	2000
107.46	2	(England) Phil Taylor	7–0	(Canada) John Part	F	2001
111.21	2	(England) Phil Taylor	6–1	(England) Shayne Burgess	2nd	2002
114.05	1	(Netherlands) Michael van Gerwen	6–2	(Netherlands) Raymond van Barneveld	SF	2017

== Women's winners ==
World Darts Federation (formerly British Darts Organisation)

Main articles: BDO World Darts Championship and WDF World Darts Championship

Year	Winner	Score	Runner-up
2001	(England) Trina Gulliver	2–1	(England) Mandy Solomons
2002	(England) Trina Gulliver	2–1	(Netherlands) Francis Hoenselaar
2003	(England) Trina Gulliver	2–0	(Scotland) Anne Kirk
2004	(England) Trina Gulliver	2–0	(Netherlands) Francis Hoenselaar
2005	(England) Trina Gulliver	2–0	(Netherlands) Francis Hoenselaar
2006	(England) Trina Gulliver	2–0	(Netherlands) Francis Hoenselaar
2007	(England) Trina Gulliver	2–1	(Netherlands) Francis Hoenselaar
2008	(Russia) Anastasia Dobromyslova	2–0	(England) Trina Gulliver
2009	(Netherlands) Francis Hoenselaar	2–1	(England) Trina Gulliver
2010	(England) Trina Gulliver	2–0	(Wales) Rhian Edwards
2011	(England) Trina Gulliver	2–0	(Wales) Rhian Edwards
2012	(Russia) Anastasia Dobromyslova	2–1	(England) Deta Hedman
2013	(Russia) Anastasia Dobromyslova	2–1	(England) Lisa Ashton
2014	(England) Lisa Ashton	3–2	(England) Deta Hedman
2015	(England) Lisa Ashton	3–1	(England) Fallon Sherrock
2016	(England) Trina Gulliver	3–2	(England) Deta Hedman
2017	(England) Lisa Ashton	3–0	(Australia) Corrine Hammond
2018	(England) Lisa Ashton	3–1	(Russia) Anastasia Dobromyslova
2019	(Japan) Mikuru Suzuki	3–0	(England) Lorraine Winstanley
2020	(Japan) Mikuru Suzuki	3–0	(England) Lisa Ashton
2022	(England) Beau Greaves	4–0	(England) Kirsty Hutchinson
2023	(England) Beau Greaves	4–1	(Netherlands) Aileen de Graaf
2024	(England) Beau Greaves	4–1	(Scotland) Sophie McKinlay
2025	(England) Deta Hedman	4–1	(Netherlands) Lerena Rietbergen

Professional Darts Corporation

Main article: PDC World Championship

Year	Winner	Score	Runner-up
2010	(United States) Stacy Bromberg	6–5 (legs)	(England) Tricia Wright

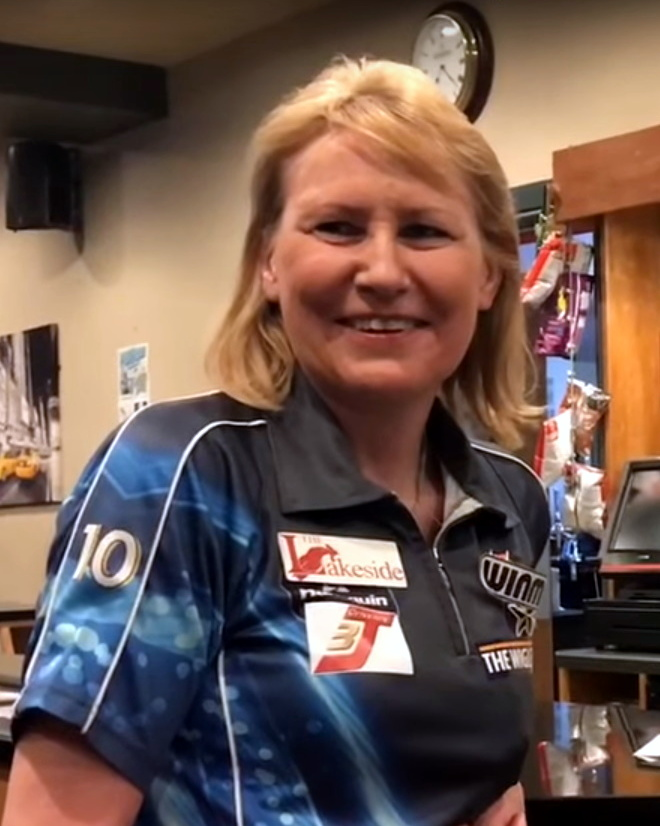
Englishwoman Trina Gulliver has won a record ten World Championships.

=== By player ===
The following sortable table lists all winners of all versions of the World Championship (correct as of 10 December 2023).

Player	Total	WDF (BDO)	PDC
(England) Trina Gulliver	10	10	–
(England) Lisa Ashton	4	4	–
(Russia) Anastasia Dobromyslova	3	3	–
(England) Beau Greaves	3	3	–
(Japan) Mikuru Suzuki	2	2	–
(Netherlands) Francis Hoenselaar	1	1	–
(England) Deta Hedman	1	1	-
(United States) Stacy Bromberg	1	–	1

=== By country ===
The following sortable table lists all winners of all versions of the World Championship (correct as of 7 December 2025).

Player	Total	WDF (BDO)	PDC
England	18	18	–
Russia	3	3	–
Japan	2	2	–
Netherlands	1	1	–
United States	1	–	1

== Youth winners ==
The British Darts Organisation scores are sets, while the Professional Darts Corporation scores are legs.

British Darts Organisation

Year	Winner	Score	Runner-up
1986	(England) Mark Day	3–1	(England) Lee Woodrow
1987	(Australia) Rowan Barry	3–2	(Singapore) Harith Lim
2015	(Netherlands) Colin Roelofs	3–0	(England) Harry Ward
2016	(England) Joshua Richardson	3–2	(Republic of Ireland) Jordan Boyce
2017	(Netherlands) Justin van Tergouw	3–2	(Scotland) Nathan Girvan
2018	(Netherlands) Justin van Tergouw	3–1	(Republic of Ireland) Killian Hefferman
2019	(England) Leighton Bennett	3–0	(Scotland) Nathan Girvan
2020	(Republic of Ireland) Keane Barry	3–0	(England) Leighton Bennett

Professional Darts Corporation (current sponsors: Winmau)

Year	Winner	Score	Runner-up
2011	(England) Arron Monk	6–4	(Netherlands) Michael van Gerwen
2012	(England) James Hubbard	6–3	(Netherlands) Michael van Gerwen
2013	(England) Michael Smith	6–1	(England) Ricky Evans
2014	(England) Keegan Brown	6–4	(Austria) Rowby-John Rodriguez
2015	(Germany) Max Hopp	6–5	(England) Nathan Aspinall
2016	(Australia) Corey Cadby	6–2	(Netherlands) Berry van Peer
2017	(Belgium) Dimitri Van den Bergh	6–3	(England) Josh Payne
2018	(Belgium) Dimitri Van den Bergh	6–3	(Germany) Martin Schindler
2019	(England) Luke Humphries	6–0	(Czech Republic) Adam Gawlas
2020	(England) Bradley Brooks	6–5	(England) Joe Davis
2021	(England) Ted Evetts	6–4	(Northern Ireland) Nathan Rafferty
2022	(Northern Ireland) Josh Rock	6–1	(Scotland) Nathan Girvan
2023	(England) Luke Littler	6–4	(Netherlands) Gian van Veen
2024	(Netherlands) Gian van Veen	6–5	(Netherlands) Jurjen van der Velde
2025	(Netherlands) Gian van Veen	6–3	(England) Beau Greaves

== Nine-dart finishes ==
Seventeen nine-dart finishes have been thrown at the World Championship. The first one was thrown by Paul Lim in the 1990 BDO World championship, while the following were thrown in the PDC World Championship.

Two have been made in world finals: firstly by Adrian Lewis in 2011 and then Michael Smith in 2023.

Number	Player	Year (+ Round)	Method	Opponent	Result
1.	Paul Lim	1990, 2nd Round	3 x T20; 3 x T20; T20, T19, D12	Jack McKenna	Won
2.	Raymond van Barneveld	2009, Quarter-Final	3 x T20; 3 x T20; T20, T19, D12	Jelle Klaasen	Won
3.	Raymond van Barneveld	2010, 2nd Round	3 x T20; 3 x T20; T20, T19, D12	Brendan Dolan	Won
4.	Adrian Lewis	2011, Final	3 x T20; 3 x T20; T20, T19, D12	Gary Anderson	Won
5.	Dean Winstanley	2013, 2nd Round	3 x T20; 3 x T20; T20, T19, D12	Vincent van der Voort	Lost
6.	Michael van Gerwen	2013, Semi-Final	3 x T20; 2 x T20, T19; 2 x T20, D12	James Wade	Won
7.	Terry Jenkins	2014, 1st Round	3 x T20; 3 x T20; T20, T19, D12	Per Laursen	Lost
8.	Kyle Anderson	2014, 1st Round	3 x T20; 3 x T20; T20, T19, D12	Ian White	Lost
9.	Adrian Lewis	2015, 3rd Round	3 x T20; 3 x T20; T20, T19, D12	Raymond van Barneveld	Lost
10.	Gary Anderson	2016, Semi-Final	3 x T20; 3 x T20; T20, T19, D12	Jelle Klaasen	Won
11.	James Wade	2021, 3rd Round	3 x T20; 3 x T20; T20, T19, D12	Stephen Bunting	Lost
12.	William Borland	2022, 1st Round	3 x T20; 2 x T20, T19; 2 x T20, D12	Bradley Brooks	Won
13.	Darius Labanauskas	2022, 1st Round	T20, 2 x T19; 3 x T20; T20, T17, D18	Mike De Decker	Lost
14.	Gerwyn Price	2022, Quarter-Final	3 x T20; 3 x T20; T19, T20, D12	Michael Smith	Lost
15.	Michael Smith	2023, Final	3 x T20; 3 x T20; T20, T19, D12	Michael van Gerwen	Won
16.	Christian Kist	2025, 1st Round	3 x T20; 3 x T20; T20, T19, D12	Madars Razma	Lost
17.	Damon Heta	2025, 3rd Round	3 x T20; 3 x T20; T20, T19, D12	Luke Woodhouse	Lost
