= Tony Sontag =

English darts player (1956–2018)

Personal information
- Born: 3 March 1956 London, England
- Died: 24 July 2018 (aged 62) London, England

Sport
- Sport: Darts
- Playing since: 1969
- Darts: 15 Gram
- Laterality: Right-handed

Organisation (see split in darts)
- BDO: 1978–1988

WDF major events – best performances
- World Championship: Last 16: 1980
- World Masters: Semi-finals: 1978

Other tournament wins
- Tournament: Years
- Bullseye Darts Championship Swedish Open Royal Hawaiian Open Witch City Open: 1979; 1980; 1981; 1988

Tony Sontag (2 March 1956 – 24 July 2018) was an English professional darts player who competed in the 1970s and 1980s.

== Darts career ==
Sontag reached the semi-finals of the 1978 British Open, losing to the eventual winner Eric Bristow. He reached the semi-finals of the 1978 Winmau World Masters, defeating Doug McCarthy and Charlie Ellix before losing to Tony Brown.

Sontag played in the 1979 BDO World Darts Championship, losing in the first round to Ronnie Davies of Wales. He won the Bullseye Darts Championship later in the year. He reached the second round of the 1980 BDO World Darts Championship, beating Rab Smith of Scotland in the first round before losing to Leighton Rees of Wales. He reached the final of the 1980 Dutch Open, losing to fellow Englishman Brian Fenby. He went on to win the 1980 Swedish Open, beating another Englishman Gordon Watson in the final. He returned to Jollees for a third time for the 1981 BDO World Darts Championship, losing in the first round to American Nicky Virachkul. Sontag won the 1988 Witch City Open champion defeating American Andy Green.

Sontag quit the BDO in 1988.

He died on 24 July 2018.

== World Championship results ==
=== BDO ===
- 1979: Last 24 (lost to Ronnie Davies 0–2) (sets)
- 1980: Last 16 (lost to Leighton Rees 0–2)
- 1981: Last 32 (lost to Nicky Virachkul 1–2)
