= Klondike Open =

Tournament information
- Venue: River Cree Resort & Casino
- Location: Edmonton
- Country: Canada
- Established: 1958
- Organisation(s): WDF Silver category
- Format: Legs
- Prize fund: C$4,750
- Month(s) Played: October

Current champion(s)
- (Canada) Shawn Burt (men's) (Canada) Brenda Moreau (women's)

The Klondike Open is a darts tournament that has been held since 1958 in Edmonton, Alberta, Canada. The tournament is currently ranked by Darts Alberta, National Darts Federation of Canada, World Darts Federation, and British Darts Organisation. The organising body is the Edmonton City Dart League which has been in existence since 1946.

== List of winners ==
=== Men's ===
Include:

Year	Champion	Score	Runner-up	Total Prize Money	Champion	Runner-up
1974	(Scotland) Harry Heenan	beat	(Canada) Allan Hogg			
1975	(Australia) George Foster	beat	(United States) Mike Morton			
1976	(Republic of Ireland) Tommy O'Regan	beat	(Canada) Jack Irvine			
1977	(Canada) Hillyard Rossiter	beat	(United States) Frank Ennis			
1978	(Canada) Howard Brazil	beat	(Canada) Keith Hughes			
1979	(Canada) Allan Hogg	beat	(Canada) Bob Sinnaeve			
1980	(Canada) Allan Hogg	beat	(Canada) Alan Hudson			
1981	(Canada) Bob Sinnaeve	beat	(Canada) Brandon Naeve			
1982	(Canada) Bob Sinnaeve	beat	(United States) Jerry Umberger			
1983	(Canada) Tony Holyoake	beat	(Canada) Bill Steinke			
1984	(Canada) Bob Sinnaeve	beat	(United States) Rick Ney			
1985	(Canada) Rick Bisaro	beat	(Canada) Arnold Parke			
1986	(Canada) Bob Sinnaeve	beat	(Canada) Avtar Gill			
1987	(Canada) Joe Gorski	beat	(Canada) Albert Anstey			
1988	(Canada) Bob Sinnaeve	beat	(Canada) Tony Holyoake			
1989	(United States) Tony Payne	beat	(United States) Andy Green			
1990	(United States) Len Heard	beat	(United States) Dieter Schutsch			
1991	(Canada) Bob Sinnaeve	beat	(United States) Russ Lopez			
1992	(Canada) Albert Anstey	beat	(Canada) Gerry Convery			
1993	(Canada) John Part	beat	(Canada) Carl Mercer			
1994	(United States) Dennis Nowroski	beat	(Canada) Todd Jeffrey			
1995	(Canada) Rick Arnott	beat	(Canada) Ken Woods			
1996	(Canada) John Part	beat	(Canada) Carl Mercer			
1997	(Canada) Shawn Brenneman	beat	(Canada) Darby Higdon			
1998	(Canada) John Part	beat	(Canada) Greg Rogers			
1999	(Canada) Wayne Walsh	beat	(Canada) Malcolm Dickinson			
2000	(Canada) Carl Mercer	beat	(Canada) Doug Scanlon			
2001	(Canada) Wayne Morrissey	beat	(Canada) Rory Orvis			
2002	(Republic of Ireland) John Murray	beat	(Canada) Matthew Haynes			
2003	(Canada) Ivan Eddy	beat	(Canada) Pat Robinson			
2004	(Canada) Gerry Convery	beat	(Canada) Tim Prokop	?	?	?
2005	(Canada) Gerry Convery	beat	(England) Tony Martin	?	?	?
2006	(Canada) Gerry Convery	beat	(Canada) Ken MacNeil	?	?	?
2007	(Canada) Gerry Convery	beat	(Canada) Martin Tremblay	?	?	?
2008	(Canada) Clint Clarkson	?-?	(Canada) Ken MacNeil	C$2,400	C$960	C$480
2009	(Canada) Keith Way	beat	(Canada) Chris Scutt	C$2,400	C$960	C$480
2010	(Canada) Bryce Book	beat	(Canada) Dion Laviolette	C$2,400	C$960	C$480
2011	(Canada) Rikk Arnott	?-?	(Canada) Scott Lee	C$2,400	C$960	C$480
2012	(Canada) Gerald Gillcrist	beat	(Canada) Rikk Arnott	C$2,500	C$1,000	C$500
2013	(Canada) Jeff Howard	beat	(Canada) Darryl Chiasson	C$2,500	C$1,000	C$500
2014	(Canada) Jeff Howard	beat	(Canada) David Cameron	C$2,500	C$1,000	C$500
2015	(Canada) Rikk Arnott	beat	(Canada) Dawson Murschell	C$2,500	C$1,000	C$500
2016	(Canada) David Cameron	beat	(Canada) Jeff Smith			
2017	(Canada) David Cameron	beat	(Canada) Jason Pelley			
2018	(Canada) Kiley Edmunds	beat	(Canada) Johhny Hannon	C$2,500	C$1,000	C$500
2019	(Canada) Jim Edmonds	beat	(Canada) Dave Tarso	C$2,500	C$1,000	C$500
2021	(Canada) Shawn Burt	5 – 2	(Canada) Dawson Murschell	n/a	n/a	n/a
2022	(Canada) Robbie Mills	Beat	(Canada) Gilbert Jaleco	n/a	n/a	n/a
2023	(Canada) Dawson Murschell	beat	(Canada) Ken MacNeil	C$3,000	C$1,200	C$600
2024	(Canada) Steve Kristjansson	5 - 2	(Canada) Logan Crooks	C$3,000	C$1,200	C$600

=== Women's ===
Year	Champion	Score	Runner-up	Total Prize Money	Champion	Runner-up
2016	(Canada) Trish Grzesik	beat	(Canada) Kim Bellay-Rousselle			
2017	(Canada) Alex Foulds	beat	(Canada) Wenda Carter			
2018	(Canada) Crystal Ludlow	beat	(Canada) Roxanne Van Tassel	C$1,250	C$500	C$250
2019	(Canada) Kim Bellay-Rousselle	beat	(Canada) Alexandra Foulds	C$1,250	C$500	C$250
2021	(Canada) Brenda Moreau	4 – 2	(Canada) Michelle Spicer	n/a	n/a	n/a
2022	(Canada) Wenda Carter	beat	(Canada) Brenda Moreau	n/a	n/a	n/a
2023	(Canada) Maria Carli	beat	(Canada) Darlene van Sleeuwen	C$1,500	C$600	C$300
2024	(Canada) Maria Carli (2)	4 - 2	(Canada) Angela Aucoin	C$1,500	C$600	C$300
