= John Kramer (darts player) =

American darts player

Personal information
- Nickname: "Big JK"
- Born: 15 December 1956 (age 69) Camp Lejeune, North Carolina, U.S.
- Home town: Bandon, County Cork, Ireland

Sport
- Sport: Darts
- Playing since: 1974
- Darts: 25g Shot! Ambassador Signature Darts (Puma Darts-New Zealand)
- Laterality: Right-handed
- Walk-on music: "Boom! Shake the Room" by DJ Jazzy Jeff & The Fresh Prince

Organisation (see split in darts)
- BDO: 1979–1989, 1999–2017

WDF major events – best performances
- World Championship: Last 32: 1982
- World Masters: Last 64: 1981

Other tournament wins
- Tournament: Years
- Las Vegas Open North American Open North American Masters WDF World Cup Team: 1980; 1981, 1999; 2000; 1985

John Kramer (born December 15, 1956) is an American former professional darts player who has competed members in the British Darts Organisation (BDO) events in the 1970s and 1980s.

== Before darts ==
Kramer started playing darts in 1974 in the weight room at his high school while recovering from a knee injury sustained during a high school football game. John quickly discovered he had a knack for the game and played his first professional tournament in Ventura, California, the weekend after graduation in 1975.

== Darts success ==
John enjoyed much success during his playing days from 1975 through 1987, including his first North American Open singles title, where he defeated world #3 ranked player, Jocky Wilson in the semi-final and the #1 player in the world at that time, Eric Bristow in the final. In 1982 he competed in the 1982 World Darts Championship but was defeated by the English darts player Tony Brown in the first round. His national ranking in 1985 earned him a spot on the US World Cup team to compete in Brisbane, Australia. The US won the team gold medal at World Cup V, which saw them defeat the English team 9-0, before going on to defeat the Australian team to win the gold medal. The US team also brought home the Silver medal for their 2nd-place finish overall. 1985 brought John to the US#1 ranking and his first Bulls-Eye News magazine cover. 1987 was when he first retired from the game for personal reasons and John enjoyed his spare time playing tournament and league softball. 1999 saw a resurgence of John's darting career after a 12-year absence, where he enjoyed many successes, including a second North American Open singles title (defeating US player Roger Carter), being part of the rare accomplishment of winning both Open Doubles events at the Las Vegas Open (with Chris White) in 2001, and a second Bulls-Eye News magazine cover. 2002 brought on a second retirement from darts and his venture into tournament paintball. 2006 has brought on another resurgence into darts. Enjoying more success at events such as the Wild West Shootout and the San Francisco Open with Open Cricket singles titles for both. 2007 added some semi-final and finals, but the quest for the perfect dart showed in the finishes. 2008 saw an Open Singles Champion for the San Diego Memorial Open.

2009 was a quiet year and 2010 brought on some very severe health issues, which left 2011 for John to pretty much learn how to throw a dart all over again. With lots more ability to travel to compete at tournaments in 2012, John has seen big improvements in his game.

John has moved to the east coast of the US and is now able to compete more often at the tournament level. John finished 2012 ranked in the top 30 in the US according to the national rankings for the American Darts Organization, and as of March 2013, is ranked at #6 in the national rankings.

John began 2013 with a new sponsor, the Puma Darts Company out of New Zealand as a Shot! Ambassador.

In 2017, John has been living in Cary, North Carolina for two years and competing locally in leagues and different events. He is not currently sponsored and not traveling to tournaments at this time. He continues to be one of the top leaders in the leagues of the area in winning percentages and averages.

== World Championship results ==
=== BDO ===
- 1982: First round (lost to Tony Brown 0–2) (sets)

== Tournament results ==
1980-2006	TOURNAMENTS	NOTABLE SINGLES FINISHES
MONTH	TOURNAMENT	FINISH
	1981	
AUGUST	NORTH AMERICAN OPEN	SINGLES CHAMPION
NOVEMBER	TRI-COUNTIES CUP	SINGLES CHAMPION
DECEMBER	A.D.O. REGION II	CHAMPION
	A.D.O. NATIONAL	SECOND PLACE
	1982	
OCTOBER	WEST COAST MASTERS	SINGLES CHAMPION
	OKTOBERFEST	SINGLES CHAMPION
DECEMBER	SAN DIEGO OPEN	SINGLES CHAMPION
	1983	
MARCH	DARTS FOR DIABETES	SINGLES CHAMPION
OCTOBER	AUTUMN DART FESTIVAL	SINGLES CHAMPION
	1984	
APRIL	FOOTHILL OPEN	SINGLES CHAMPION
JULY	COLORADO OPEN	TEAM FINALIST
AUGUST	LOS ANGELES OPEN	SINGLES CHAMPION
DECEMBER	BRITISH OPEN	OPEN SINGLES-17TH PLACE
DECEMBER	A.D.O. REGION II-3	THIRD PLACE
	A.D.O. NATIONAL	TENTH PLACE
	1985	
MARCH	NEW MEXICO OPEN	SINGLES CHAMPION
APRIL	BAKERSFIELD OPEN	SINGLES CHAMPION
MAY	DALLAS OPEN	SINGLES CHAMPION
JULY	COLORADO OPEN	SINGLES CHAMPION
JULY	MARQUISE WARM-UP	501 SINGLES CHAMPION
AUGUST	PEACHTREE OPEN	SINGLES CHAMPION
NOVEMBER	OLD PUEBLO CLASSIC	CRICKET SINGLES CHAMPION
DECEMBER	ADO REGION II-3	FIRST PLACE
	ADO NATIONAL	FIRST PLACE
	1999	
AUGUST	NORTH AMERICAN OPEN	SINGLES CHAMPION
	2001	
APRIL	CHARLOTTE OPEN	CRICKET SINGLES CHAMPION
	2006	
MAY	WILD WEST SHOOTOUT	CRICKET SINGLES CHAMPION
AUGUST	RHADT TOURNAMENT	SINGLES CHAMPION
SEPTEMBER	SAN FRANCISCO OPEN	CRICKET SINGLES CHAMPION
