= Jim McQuillan =

Jim McQuillan may refer to:

- Jim McQuillan (chemist), Fellow of the Royal Society Te Apārangi
- Jim McQuillan (computer programmer), founder and project leader of the Linux Terminal Server Project
- Jim McQuillan (darts player) (born 1940), Irish former darts player
