= Ronnie Davis (darts player) =

English darts player (born 1942)

Personal information
- Born: 10 August 1942 (age 84) Newcastle upon Tyne, England

Sport
- Sport: Darts
- Playing since: 1967
- Darts: 28g
- Laterality: Right-handed

Organisation (see split in darts)
- BDO: 1978–1979, 1983

WDF major events – best performances
- World Championship: Last 16: 1979
- World Masters: Winner (1): 1978

Other tournament wins
- Tournament: Years
- Royal Hawaiian Open: 1979

Ronnie Davis (born 10 August 1942) is a retired English professional darts player who played in British Darts Organisation events in the 1970s and 1980s.

== Career ==
Davis won the 1978 Winmau World Masters, beating Keith Harvey, Colin Baker and Cliff Lazarenko before beating Tony Brown in the final. Davis then played in the 1979 BDO World Darts Championship, beating Tony Sontag in the first round before losing in the second round to Alan Evans.

== World Championship results ==
=== BDO ===
- 1979: Last 16: (lost to Alan Evans 0–2) (sets)

=== BDO major finals: 1 (1 title) ===
Legend
World Masters (1–0)

| Outcome | No. | Year | Championship | Opponent in the final | Score |
|---|---|---|---|---|---|
| Winner | 1. | 1978 | World Masters | (England) Tony Brown | 2–1 (s) |

== Performance timeline ==
| Tournament | 1978 | 1979 |
|---|---|---|
| BDO World Championship | DNP | 2R |
| World Masters | W | L64 |
| Butlins Grand Masters | 1R | DNP |
