= 1984 BDO World Darts Championship =

BDO World Darts Championship

Tournament information
- Dates: 31 December 1983 – 7 January 1984
- Venue: Jollees Cabaret Club
- Location: Stoke-on-Trent
- Country: England
- Organisation(s): BDO
- Format: Sets; Final – best of 13
- Prize fund: £38,500
- Winner's share: £9,000
- High checkout: 161 (England) Eric Bristow (Wales) Malcolm Davies (Wales) Peter Locke (England) John Lowe (Scotland) Jocky Wilson

Champion(s)
- (England) Eric Bristow

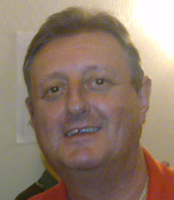
1984 BDO World Darts Champion - Eric Bristow

The 1984 BDO World Darts Championship (known for sponsorship reasons as The 1984 Embassy World Darts Championship) was held from 31 December 1983 to 7 January 1984 at Jollees Cabaret Club in Stoke-on-Trent.

Eric Bristow made up for his defeat against Keith Deller in the previous year's final by winning his third world title having dropped just one set in the entire tournament. He beat Finn Jensen, Rick Ney, Peter Locke and John Lowe before defeating Dave Whitcombe in the final by 7 sets to 1.

Deller suffered a shock first-round defeat to 1978 semi-finalist Nicky Virachkul, who eventually lost to Whitcombe in the quarter-finals. Whitcombe then came from 4–2 down to beat Jocky Wilson 6–5 in the semi-finals. In a famous moment at the end of the match, Wilson drunkenly fell down on the stage before congratulating Whitcombe.

== Seeds ==
1. (England) Eric Bristow
2. (Scotland) Jocky Wilson
3. (England) Dave Whitcombe
4. (England) Cliff Lazarenko
5. (England) John Lowe
6. (England) Keith Deller
7. (Sweden) Stefan Lord
8. (England) Bobby George

== Prize money ==
The prize fund was £36,200.

Champion: £9,000
Runner-Up: £4,000
Semi-Finalists (2): £2,250
Quarter-Finalists (4): £1,250
Last 16 (8): £750
Last 32 (16): £450

There was also a 9-Dart Checkout prize of £52,000, along with a High Checkout prize of £800.

== The Results ==
First Round (best of 3 sets)
1	(England) Eric Bristow (91.50)	2
(Denmark) Finn Jensen (89.10)	0
(United States) Rick Ney (82.20)	2
(Belgium) Luc Marreel (82.20)	1
8	(England) Bobby George (81.30)	1
(Wales) Malcolm Davies (80.70)	2
(Wales) Peter Locke (82.80)	2
(Australia) Russell Stewart (85.80)	0
5	(England) John Lowe (99.00)	2
(England) Tony Brown (80.10)	0
(Republic of Ireland) John Joe O'Shea (74.70)	2
(Canada) Alex MacKinnon (64.20)	0
4	(England) Cliff Lazarenko (83.10)	1
(Wales) Ceri Morgan (84.60)	2
(Finland) Kexi Heinäharju (75.60)	2
(Scotland) Danny Inglis (72.60)	1
2	(Scotland) Jocky Wilson (93.90)	2
(Australia) Terry O'Dea (74.40)	0
(England) Alan Glazier (82.50)	2
(England) Rab Scott (78.00)	1
7	(Sweden) Stefan Lord (75.90)	2
(England) Bob Anderson (80.40)	0
(England) Mike Gregory (89.40)	2
(Papua New Guinea) Paul Lim (79.20)	0
6	(England) Keith Deller (84.00)	1
(United States) Nicky Virachkul (78.30)	2
(England) Gerry Haywood (78.90)	2
(Wales) Owen Thomas (69.90)	0
3	(England) Dave Whitcombe (81.90)	2
(Canada) Bob Sinnaeve (78.30)	0
(Northern Ireland) Steve Brennan (78.60)	2
(Australia) Kevin White (81.00)	1

Second Round (best of 7 sets)
1	(England) Eric Bristow (94.50)	4
(United States) Rick Ney (88.50)	0
(Wales) Malcolm Davies (85.80)	3
(Wales) Peter Locke (89.40)	4
5	(England) John Lowe (87.90)	4
(Republic of Ireland) John Joe O'Shea (83.70)	0
(Wales) Ceri Morgan (83.10)	4
(Finland) Kexi Heinäharju (70.50)	1
2	(Scotland) Jocky Wilson (97.50)	4
(England) Alan Glazier (84.00)	0
7	(Sweden) Stefan Lord (78.30)	1
(England) Mike Gregory (87.60)	4
(United States) Nicky Virachkul (80.40)	4
(England) Gerry Haywood (71.70)	0
3	(England) Dave Whitcombe (88.80)	4
(Northern Ireland) Steve Brennan (84.60)	1

Quarter-Finals (best of 9 sets)
1	(England) Eric Bristow (95.70)	5
(Wales) Peter Locke (85.50)	0
5	(England) John Lowe (90.30)	5
(Wales) Ceri Morgan (87.30)	0
2	(Scotland) Jocky Wilson (92.10)	5
(England) Mike Gregory (85.20)	0
(United States) Nicky Virachkul (79.50)	0
3	(England) Dave Whitcombe (85.50)	5

Semi-Finals (best of 11 sets)
1	(England) Eric Bristow (93.60)	6
5	(England) John Lowe (83.70)	0
2	(Scotland) Jocky Wilson (90.90)	5
3	(England) Dave Whitcombe (91.50)	6

Final (best of 13 sets)
1	(England) Eric Bristow (97.50)	7
3	(England) Dave Whitcombe (90.60)	1
