= Allan Hogg =

Canadian darts player (1939–2022)

Personal information
- Nickname: "Big Al"
- Born: 1 November 1939 Newcastle upon Tyne, England
- Died: 2 June 2022 (aged 82)
- Home town: North York, Ontario, Canada

Sport
- Sport: Darts
- Playing since: 1967
- Darts: 24g
- Laterality: Right-handed
- Walk-on music: "You Shook Me All Night Long" by AC/DC

Organisation (see split in darts)
- BDO: 1977–1981

WDF major events – best performances
- World Championship: Last 16: 1981
- World Masters: Runner Up: 1979

Other tournament wins
- Tournament: Years
- Canadian National Championship: 1978

Allan Hogg (November 1, 1939 – June 2, 2022) was an English-born Canadian professional darts player who competed in the 1970s and 1980s. He was nicknamed Big Al.

== Life and career ==
After winning the 1978 Canadian National Championship who will beat Hillyard Rossiter, Hogg reached the final of the 1979 Winmau World Masters. He defeated Tony Brown, Tony Clark and Barry Done before losing to Eric Bristow. In 1980. He was on the Unipart World Team Darts Matchplay with Tony Holyoake and Tony Foley to Canada. He then played in the 1980 BDO World Darts Championship, losing in the first round to Australian Alan Grant. In the 1981 BDO World Darts Championship, Hogg defeated Les Capewell in the first round before losing to John Lowe in round two.

Hogg quit the BDO in 1981. He died on June 2, 2022, at the age of 82.

== World Championship results ==
=== BDO ===
- 1980: 1st Round: (lost to Alan Grant 1–2) (sets)
- 1981: 2nd Round: (lost to John Lowe 1–2)

=== BDO major finals: 1 (1 runner-up) ===
| Outcome | No. | Year | Championship | Opponent in the final | Score (Note: (l) = score in legs, (s) = score in sets.) |
|---|---|---|---|---|---|
| Runner-up | 1. | 1979 | Winmau World Masters | (England) Eric Bristow | 0–2 (s) |
