= Wayne Weening =

Australian darts player

Personal information
- Full name: Wayne Dirk Weening
- Born: 15 March 1965 (age 61) Geelong, Australia
- Home town: Geelong, Australia

Sport
- Sport: Darts
- Playing since: 1983
- Darts: 23 Gram
- Laterality: Right-handed
- Walk-on music: "Are You Gonna Be My Girl" by Jet

Organisation (see split in darts)
- BDO: 1988–2012
- PDC: 2012–2016

WDF major events – best performances
- World Championship: Quarter Finals: 1993
- World Masters: Last 32: 1991, 1993, 1995

Other tournament wins
- Tournament: Years
- Australian Masters Dortmund Open Swedish Open WDF World Cup Pairs: 1989, 1999; 1991; 1995; 1991
- Updated on 1 September 2021

Wayne Dirk Weening (born 15 March 1965) is an Australian former professional darts player who competed in the 1980s and 1990s.

== Career ==
Weening made his debut in 1989 BDO World Darts Championship reaching the last 16 by beating Cliff Lazarenko before losing to Bob Anderson. In October 1989 WDF World Cup Team are Russell Stewart, Frank Palko and Keith Sullivan who beating England in the Semi finals by 3 legs to 9 before losing to Canada are Rick Bisaro, Albert Anstey, Tony Holyoake and Bob Sinnaeve by 7 legs to 9 Canada is the Winner.

In 1991, Weening on the WDF World Cup Team Australia are Wayne Atkins, Allen Kingston and Keith Sullivan.

Weening made seven BDO World Darts Championship appearances with his best performance coming in 1993, reaching the quarter-finals by beating Rod Harrington and Albert Anstey before losing to Alan Warriner. He also played in three World Masters, in 1991, 1993 and 1995, losing in the first round in each year.

Weening's son Brandon is also a darts player who has played on the WDF youth circuit.

== World Championship results ==
=== BDO ===
- 1989: 2nd Round (lost to Bob Anderson 1–3) (sets)
- 1990: 1st Round (lost Steve Gittins 0–3)
- 1992: 1st Round (lost to Mike Gregory 1–3)
- 1993: Quarter Finals (lost to Alan Warriner-Little 1–4)
- 1994: 1st Round (lost to Magnus Caris 2–3)
- 1996: 1st Round (lost to Richie Burnett 0–3)
- 1998: 1st Round (lost to Ted Hankey 0–3)
