= Andy Green (darts player) =

American darts player

Personal information
- Full name: Andrew Green
- Born: United States

Sport
- Sport: Darts
- Darts: 24g
- Laterality: Right-handed

Organisation (see split in darts)
- BDO: 1979–1984

WDF major events – best performances
- World Championship: Last 24: 1979
- World Masters: Last 128: 1984

Andrew Green is an American former professional darts player who competed in events of the British Darts Organisation (BDO) in the 1970s and 1980s.

== Career ==
Green played in the 1979 BDO World Darts Championship, where he lost in the first round to Alan Glazier. Later, he made a return to Jollees in the 1983 BDO World Darts Championship, to again lose in the first round to Dave Whitcombe. He played the 1982 WDF Pacific Cup singles, losing in the final to Terry O'Dea.

== World Championship results ==
=== BDO ===
- 1979: Last 24: (lost to Alan Glazier 1–2)
- 1983: Last 32: (lost to Dave Whitcombe 1–2)
