= 1980 BDO World Darts Championship =

Tournament information
- Dates: 2–9 February 1980
- Venue: Jollees Cabaret Club
- Location: Stoke-on-Trent
- Country: England
- Organisation(s): BDO
- Format: Sets; Final – best of 9
- Prize fund: £15,000
- Winner's share: £4,500
- High checkout: 161 (England) Tony Sontag (Australia) Terry O'Dea

Champion(s)
- (England) Eric Bristow

The 1980 BDO World Darts Championship (known for sponsorship reasons as The 1980 Embassy World Darts Championship) was the third year that the British Darts Organisation had staged a world championship. Again the field was 24 players, with the top seeds receiving a bye to the last 16 stage. For the second successive year the tournament was staged at Jollees Cabaret Club in Stoke-on-Trent.

Defending champion John Lowe, who had released a book The Lowe Profile just before the event suffered a surprise defeat 0–2 to Cliff Lazarenko saying afterwards "If you miss your doubles in this one, you must expect to go out." Eric Bristow was then immediately installed as favourite to win the event and would meet another flamboyant character of the game in the final – Bobby George.

George, who was not invited to the qualifiers the previous year appeared in a sequined shirt and when arriving on the stage was presented with a candelabra to complete a Liberace effect. He also made the early running in the final leading 1–0, 2–1 and 3–2. The first six sets all went to a deciding leg until Bristow won the seventh 3–1 to establish a 4–3 set lead. In the next set at 2–2 in legs, George had a golden opportunity to level the match and take it to a decider, but bust his score and nonchalantly threw his third dart into the board before putting his darts into his top pocket in anticipation of Bristow checking out to win the title. Bristow did so.

Bristow later said: "This was the final that changed the game of darts forever. Before that the audiences were always quite subdued, there was never really a buzz around the place, but when Bobby and I played in that final every member of the audience got involved. Everybody quite simply was going mad. It was a pit of noise. He had his fans, I had mine and both wanted to out-shout each other.

== Seeds ==
1. (England) John Lowe
2. (England) Eric Bristow
3. (England) Tony Brown
4. (Wales) Leighton Rees
5. (England) Bobby George
6. (United States) Nicky Virachkul
7. (Scotland) Jocky Wilson
8. (Wales) Ceri Morgan

== Prize money ==
The prize fund was £15,000.

Champion: £4,500
Runner-Up: £2,000
3rd Place: £500
Semi-Finalists (2): £1,000
Quarter-Finalists (4): £500
Last 16 (8): £300
Last 24 (8): £200

== Results ==
First round (best of 3 sets); 2–3 February
(England) Paul Gosling 77.79	0
(England) Cliff Lazarenko 81.40	2
(Canada) Allan Hogg 72.21	1
(Australia) Alan Grant 77.19	2
(United States) Len Heard 76.17	0
(England) Dave Whitcombe 81.99	2
(Scotland) Rab Smith 85.02	1
(England) Tony Sontag 84.151	2
(England) Alan Glazier 69.33	0
(Wales) Tony Clark 78.45	2
(United States) Conrad Daniels 77.01	0
(England) Doug McCarthy 74.25	2
(Sweden) Stefan Lord 78.39	1
(England) Bill Lennard 75.57	2
(Scotland) Eric MacLean 81.72	1
(Australia) Terry O'Dea 82.29	2

Second round (best of 3 sets); 4–6 February
1	(England) John Lowe 86.43	0
(England) Cliff Lazarenko 89.04	2
8	(Wales) Ceri Morgan 76.38	2
(Australia) Alan Grant 71.25	1
5	(England) Bobby George 91.20	2
(England) Dave Whitcombe 84.15	0
4	(Wales) Leighton Rees 78.78	2
(England) Tony Sontag 81.93	0
2	(England) Eric Bristow 79.89	2
(Wales) Tony Clark 79.23	0
7	(Scotland) Jocky Wilson 82.11	2
(England) Doug McCarthy 79.14	0
6	(United States) Nicky Virachkul 76.56	0
(England) Bill Lennard 82.80	2
3	(England) Tony Brown 82.50	2
(Australia) Terry O'Dea 76.77	0

Quarter-finals (best of 5 sets); 6–7 February
(England) Cliff Lazarenko 86.79	3
8	(Wales) Ceri Morgan 86.70	1
5	(England) Bobby George 75.39	3
4	(Wales) Leighton Rees 73.59	1
2	(England) Eric Bristow 81.90	3
7	(Scotland) Jocky Wilson 78.90	0
(England) Bill Lennard 79.80	0
3	(England) Tony Brown 84.30	3

Semi-finals (best of 7 sets); 8 February
(England) Cliff Lazarenko 84.27	1
5	(England) Bobby George 79.89	4
2	(England) Eric Bristow 86.22	4
3	(England) Tony Brown 86.28	3

Final (best of 9 sets); 9 February
5	(England) Bobby George 86.49	3
2	(England) Eric Bristow 88.11	5

3rd place match (best of 3 sets) (England) Cliff Lazarenko 88.02 0 – 2 Tony Brown (England) 99.24
