= 1979 BDO World Darts Championship =

Tournament information
- Dates: 2–9 February 1979
- Venue: Jollees Cabaret Club
- Location: Stoke-on-Trent
- Country: England
- Organisation(s): BDO
- Format: Sets; Final – best of 9
- Prize fund: £15,000
- Winner's share: £4,500
- High checkout: 161 (England) Tony Brown (England) Ronnie Davis

Champion(s)
- (England) John Lowe

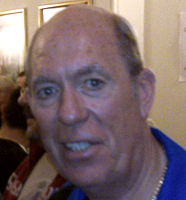
1979 BDO World Darts Champion - John Lowe

The 1979 BDO World Darts Championship (known for sponsorship reasons as The 1979 Embassy World Darts Championship) was the second World Professional Championships. Having been held the previous year at the Heart of the Midlands Club in Nottingham, the event moved to Jollees Cabaret Club in Stoke-on-Trent where it was to remain until 1985.

The tournament was held between 2 February and 9 February and had been expanded from 16 players to 24. The eight seeded players each received a bye into the second round. The format also changed from a straight matchplay (legs) to sets. Each set was the best of 5 legs. - For matches in the opening rounds the matches were best of three sets, - best of five for the quarter-finals and semi-finals, with the final being best of 9 sets, split over an afternoon and evening session with the play-off for third held in between.

Defending champion, Leighton Rees of Wales again progressed to the final where he met John Lowe in a repeat of the inaugural championship. This time, Lowe was the top seed and came out on top in the final by 5 sets to 0.

== New players ==
With the expansion from 16 to 24 players in the finals, 11 players made their championship debuts, the most notable being John Wilson of Scotland, - no doubt to be soon known as Jocky. Wilson's performances over 1978 had enabled him to be seeded 8th for the tournament, and thus ensure a place in round 2 straight away.

== Seeds ==
Wilson entering the seeds meant he would replace Rab Smith, the Scot having to play the first round before moving into the later stages. England's John Lowe had risen to be number 1 seed, with Eric Bristow dropping to 2nd seed after his first round defeat a year earlier. Leighton Rees remained seeded 3, with Tony Brown moving up to number 4. The Semi-Finalist from 1978 Nicky Virachkul was seeded 5th with the other Last 4-man, Stefan Lord seeded 6th. Alan Evans was the 7th seed along with Wilson as 8th.

1. (England) John Lowe
2. (England) Eric Bristow
3. (Wales) Leighton Rees
4. (England) Tony Brown
5. (United States) Nicky Virachkul
6. (Sweden) Stefan Lord
7. (Wales) Alan Evans
8. (Scotland) Jocky Wilson

== Prize money ==
Total Prize fund was £15,000 (plus a £12,000 bonus for a nine-dart finish - not won)

- Champion £4,500
- Runner-up £2,000
- Third Place £1,500
- Fourth Place £1,000
- Quarter finalists £500
- 2nd round losers £300
- 1st round losers £200

== Results ==
First round (best of 3 sets); 2–3 February
(England) Charlie Ellix 69.22	1
(England) Doug McCarthy 68.63	2
(New Zealand) Murray Smith 68.71	0
(Republic of Ireland) Jim McQuillan 71.58	2
(United States) Andy Green 70.33	1
(England) Alan Glazier 77.43	2
(Australia) Barry Atkinson 76.74	1
(Wales) Ceri Morgan 78.62	2
(England) Cliff Lazarenko 78.47	0
(Australia) Terry O'Dea 79.90	2
(England) Tony Sontag 82.21	0
(England) Ronnie Davis 87.40	2
(United States) Conrad Daniels 72.02	1
(Scotland) Rab Smith 74.65	2
(England) Bill Lennard 74.60	0
(Wales) Tony Clark 76.32	2

Second round (best of 3 sets); 4–6 February
1	(England) John Lowe 88.84	2
(England) Doug McCarthy 71.73	0
8	(Scotland) Jocky Wilson 72.17	2
(Republic of Ireland) Jim McQuillan 73.25	1
5	(United States) Nicky Virachkul 86.62	1
(England) Alan Glazier 85.21	2
4	(England) Tony Brown 81.24	2
(Wales) Ceri Morgan 71.57	0
2	(England) Eric Bristow 81.45	2
(Australia) Terry O'Dea 65.40	0
7	(Wales) Alan Evans 79.75	2
(England) Ronnie Davis 82.34	0
6	(Sweden) Stefan Lord 79.47	1
(Scotland) Rab Smith 73.30	2
3	(Wales) Leighton Rees 76.90	2
(Wales) Tony Clark 77.78	1

Quarter-finals (best of 5 sets); 6–7 February
1	(England) John Lowe 83.46	3
8	(Scotland) Jocky Wilson 78.08	1
(England) Alan Glazier 86.58	2
4	(England) Tony Brown 84.57	3
2	(England) Eric Bristow 71.33	1
7	(Wales) Alan Evans 82.27	3
(Scotland) Rab Smith 74.53	0
3	(Wales) Leighton Rees 83.16	3

Semi-finals (best of 5 sets); 8 February
1	(England) John Lowe 81.35	3
4	(England) Tony Brown 78.35	2
7	(Wales) Alan Evans 79.58	1
3	(Wales) Leighton Rees 76.96	3

Final (best of 9 sets); 9 February
1	(England) John Lowe 86.13	5
3	(Wales) Leighton Rees 77.61	0

John Lowe won the final 5-0 (3-1, 3-0, 3-0, 3-2, 3-0) and thus became the 1979 BDO World Darts Champion. Illness prevented Alan Evans from playing the third-place match, so Tony Brown took third place by default.
