= Tony Holyoake =

Canadian darts player

Personal information
- Full name: Anthony Holyoake
- Nickname: "Shakey"
- Born: 28 January 1946 (age 80) Derby, England
- Home town: Calgary, Canada

Sport
- Sport: Darts
- Playing since: 1967
- Darts: 24g Shot
- Laterality: Right-handed
- Walk-on music: "No Time" by The Guess Who

Organisation (see split in darts)
- BDO: 1980–1995
- PDC: 1996–1997

WDF major events – best performances
- World Championship: Last 32: 1983
- World Masters: Last 64: 1982

Other tournament wins
- Tournament: Years
- Alberta Open Royal Hawaiian Open WDF World Cup Team Canada National Championships Las Vegas Open: 1982; 1988; 1989; 1992; 1995

Tony Holyoake (born 28 January 1946) is an English-born Canadian former professional darts player who has competed members in the 1980s and 1990s.

== Career ==
Holyoake played in the 1983 BDO World Darts Championship, losing in the first round 2–1 to England's Dave Lee.

Holyoake is also a former Canadian National Champion, winning the title in 1992. He has represented Canada on numerous occasions: Three World Cup Teams, two Pacific Cup Teams, all of the Canada v USA international matches except 1, 1980 Unipart World Team Darts Matchplay with Allan Hogg and Tony Foley to Canada, and most recently the 1996 PDC World Pairs Championship with Gary Mawson to United States & Canada. Eight times National Royal Canadian Singles Champion. Calgary Super Singles Champion.national darts Mixed doubles Champion Twice. Pacific Cup open singles Champion. Number 7 televised National Singles Champion. Holyoake won the 1988 Royal Hawaiian Open darts tournament champion he beating by Tony Payne of United States in semi-finalist and Terry O'Dea of Australia in the final.

Holyoake won the 1989 WDF World Cup Team championship (with Albert Anstey, Rick Bisaro and Bob Sinnaeve) beating Team Australia (Frank Palko, Russell Stewart, Keith Sullivan and Wayne Weening) 9–7.

Holyoake quit of the PDC in January 1997.

== Personal life ==
Holyoake married professional darts player Gayl King. The couple has resided in Calgary, Alberta since October 2022.

== World Championship results ==
=== BDO ===
- 1983: Last 32 (lost to Dave Lee 1–2) (sets)
