= Gerry Convery =

Canadian darts player

Personal information
- Nickname: "The Rover"
- Born: 27 September 1955 (age 71) Derry, Northern Ireland
- Home town: Winnipeg, Canada

Sport
- Sport: Darts
- Playing since: 1987
- Darts: 24g
- Laterality: Right-handed
- Walk-on music: "Vertigo" by U2

Organisation (see split in darts)
- PDC: 2001–2011

WDF major events – best performances
- World Masters: Last 192: 2001

PDC premier events – best performances
- World Championship: Last 32: 2005, 2006
- Desert Classic: Last 16: 2004
- US Open/WSoD: Last 32: 2007

Other tournament wins
- Tournament: Years
- Klondike Open Canada National Championships Quebec Open The Main Event Chris Hatter Memorial Greater Vancouver Open: 2004, 2005, 2006, 2007; 2005; 2008; 2004, 2009; 2005, 2007; 2005, 2008, 2009

Gerry Convery (born September 27, 1955) is a Northern Irish-born Canadian former professional darts player.

== Career ==
From Winnipeg. Convery played in the 2001 Winmau World Masters, where he lost in the Last 192 stage to Wayne Jones of England

Convery made his televised debut in the 2004 Las Vegas Desert Classic, beating Darren Webster in the first round before losing in the second round to Dennis Smith. Convery then played in the 2005 PDC World Darts Championship, beating Tang Jun of China in the first round and then beat Wes Newton to progress to the third round where he lost to fellow Canadian John Part. Convery also won the Canada National Championship in 2005.

He returned to Las Vegas for the 2005 Desert Classic but lost in the first round to Alex Roy. Convery then returned to the World Championship in 2006, beating Dave Askew in the first round before losing in the second round to Alan Warriner-Little. Convery then suffered first round exits in the World Championships in 2007 to Steve Beaton and in 2008 to Barrie Bates. He also suffered first round losses in the 2007 and 2008 Desert Classics, losing to Mervyn King and Jelle Klaasen.

2008 was not a good year for Convery. Apart from winning the WDF-ranked Quebec Open, he suffered early exits in the North American Darts Championship and the US Open as well as the Players Championship Las Vegas. He also lost his Klondike Open title which he had won the past four years, losing in the semi-finals. He didn't earn enough money to qualify for the 2009 PDC World Darts Championship through the North American rankings.

== World Championship results ==
=== PDC ===
- 2005: 2nd round (lost to John Part 1–4) (sets)
- 2006: 2nd round (lost to Alan Warriner-Little 0–4)
- 2007: 1st round (lost to Steve Beaton 0–3)
- 2008: 1st round (lost to Barrie Bates 0–3)
