= Jim McQuillan (darts player) =

Irish darts player

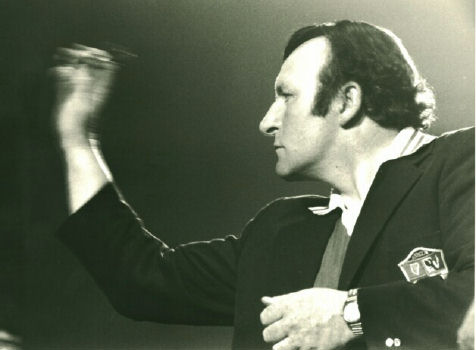
- McQuillan in 1974

Personal information
- Full name: James McQuillan
- Born: 3 December 1940 (age 85)
- Home town: Dundalk, County Louth, Ireland

Sport
- Sport: Darts
- Playing since: 1963
- Darts: 25g Elkadart
- Laterality: Right-handed

Organisation (see split in darts)
- BDO: 1974–1980
- WDF: 1974–1980

WDF major events – best performances
- World Championship: Last 16: 1979
- World Masters: Last 16: 1975

James "Jim" McQuillan (born 3 December 1940) is an Irish former professional darts player who played in British Darts Organisation (BDO) and World Darts Federation (WDF) events in the 1970s and 1980s. He is from County Louth.

== Career ==
In 1974, McQuillan became Ireland's first ever News of the World Darts Championship Divisional Champion, playing out of the Vine Inn in Dundalk. McQuillan played in the 1975 World Masters, reaching the last 16.

After contesting the 1978 News of the World Darts Championship, in which he finished joint fifth place, he then played in the 1979 BDO World Darts Championship, exiting in the second round after defeat to Scotland's Jocky Wilson.

In 1977, McQuillan was on the Irish team in the WDF World Cup. He represented the Republic of Ireland again at the 1978 BDO Nations Cup.

After reaching the quarter-finals of the 1980 WDF Europe Cup in Wales, McQuillan quit the BDO.

== World Championship results ==
=== BDO ===
- 1979: 2nd round (lost to Jocky Wilson 1–2) (sets)
