= 1978 BDO World Darts Championship =

Tournament information
- Dates: 5–10 February 1978
- Venue: Heart of the Midlands Club
- Location: Nottingham
- Country: England
- Organisation(s): BDO
- Format: Legs; Final – best of 21
- Prize fund: £10,500
- Winner's share: £3,000
- High checkout: 161 (Sweden) Stefan Lord (Wales) Leighton Rees

Champion(s)
- (Wales) Leighton Rees

The 1978 BDO World Darts Championship (known for sponsorship reasons as The 1978 Embassy World Darts Championship) was the first BDO World Darts Championship. The tournament was organised by the British Darts Organisation who had already set up the WDF World Cup and Winmau World Masters in its five years since formation. This was the only year that the tournament was played in a matchplay format of legs, rather than sets which came into operation from 1979 onwards. BBC Television covered the event and began a long broadcasting partnership with the BDO. Sid Waddell was the lead commentator on the tournament which he would cover for the BBC until 1994.

The championships became possible when Mike Watterson, a snooker promoter, came up with the idea whilst sat in a barber's chair in 1977. Imperial Tobacco, who already sponsored the World Snooker Championship with their Embassy brand, were also interested and with Watterson promoting the event Imperial also signed up to the darts version, which they were to sponsor for 25 years. The relationship only ended when the UK government outlawed tobacco sponsorship of sporting events.

The tournament was held between 6 and 10 February. The tournament was held, for the only time, at the Heart of the Midlands Club in Nottingham. The BDO decided to move the event to Jollees Cabaret Club in Stoke-on-Trent for the following year.

The third night of the tournament was when tournament began to be lit up when Leighton Rees checked out in ten darts in front of the TV cameras. Eric Bristow was the number one seed for the championship, but suffered a surprise second round defeat to Conrad Daniels of the United States.

The number three seed, Leighton Rees of Wales beat number two seed, England's John Lowe 11–7 in the final. He began to pull ahead when a 180 and a 13-dart leg extended his lead from 8–7 to 9–7 and then he took the next two as well for the £3,000 top prize and the title as first ever World Darts Champion

== Seeds ==
1. (England) Eric Bristow
2. (England) John Lowe
3. (Wales) Leighton Rees
4. (Scotland) Rab Smith
5. (Wales) Alan Evans
6. (Sweden) Stefan Lord
7. (United States) Nicky Virachkul
8. (England) Tony Brown

== Prize money ==
Total Prize fund was £10,500

- Champion £3,000
- Runner-up £1,700
- Third Place £1,000
- Fourth Place £800
- Quarter finalists £500
- 1st round losers £250

== Tournament review ==
Day One – Monday 6 February

The first days play at the inaugural Embassy World Darts Championships saw 4 first round matches, played over the best of 11 legs. In the opening match, number 1 seed Eric Bristow, a man who would later go on to dominate this event by reaching 10 finals over the 1980s and early 1990s bowed out 6–3 to American Conrad Daniels. Then in an all North American battle, Nicky Virachkul knocked out Hillyard Rossiter 6–0, the first ever World Championship whitewash.

The third game saw number 5 seed Alan Evans come through a tricky match against England's Alan Glazier by 6 legs to 4. There would be a Welsh semi-finalist guaranteed after 3rd seed and fellow Welshman Leighton Rees set up a quarter-final on Wednesday after beating Australian Barry Atkinson 6–0.

Day Two – Tuesday 7 February

The first round would be completed today, in the opening match, 4th seeded Scot Rab Smith would smoothly book a second round spot with a 6–0 win over Irishman Patrick Clifford. He would be up against a Swede before the match would be finished. Stefan Lord, seeded 6 won 6–3 against Kenth Ohlsson. Then the second surprise of the tournament came in defeat for 8th seed Tony Brown of England, 6–3 to Australian namesake Tim Brown. The final match would see John Lowe, the highest seed remaining in the Embassy draw begin with a 6–1 win over Bobby Semple of Scotland.

Day Three – Wednesday 8 February

All 4 Quarter-Finals were played today, the matches still over the best of 11 legs.

A change in the broadcasting style – and this change was here to stay. After many complaints the BBC decided to split the screen enabling viewer to see the player's reactions and styles of throw. The first quarter-final saw Conrad Daniels leave the tournament after a great first round win over Eric Bristow, Nick Virachkul going into the semi-finals a 6–4 win.

Then came arguably one of the best games of the tournament, Evans vs. Rees. Evans took the first two legs in 13 darts, scoring two 180's in the first leg and a 177 in the second leg. Then with Rees 3–2, he took the 6th leg with scores of 137, 180, 180 & double 2 first dart, the first 10 darter on national television. Rees would go on to take the match with a 161 checkout for a 12 darter leg and a place against Virachkul by 6 legs to 3. Both players averaged over 90 during this match, which was unique for this tournament amongst the recorded averages.

The bottom half of the draw saw Stefan Lord knock out Rab Smith in a surprising 6–3 win, whilst John Lowe continued his progress in the tournament, a 6–1 win over Tim Brown, a second 6–1 win for Lowe in the tournament so far.

Day Four – Thursday 9 February

The Semi-Finals and the third place play-off would be held today. Matches in the Semi-Finals being extended to the best of 15 legs, whilst the play-off would be the best of nine legs. Wales would have a finalist in the first ever World Championships, after Rees snuck home in the only match to go all the way, Rees winning 8–7 to end American hopes.

In the Second semi-final, John Lowe put out Stefan Lord 8–4 in a comfortable victory, consolation for Virachkul came in victory in the play-off, the American taking home £1000 for his week with Lord taking £800 after the play-off, which Virachkul won 5–4.

THE FINAL – Day Five – Friday 10 February

Rees vs. Lowe in a match for £3,000, the loser would take £1,700. Rees would become champion, winning the final by 11 legs to seven.

== Results ==
First round (best of 11 legs); 6–7 February
1 | (England) Eric Bristow 74.71 | 3
(United States) Conrad Daniels 81.19 | 6
7 | (United States) Nicky Virachkul 84.28 | 6
(Canada) Hillyard Rossiter 70.97 | 0
5 | (Wales) Alan Evans 85.39 | 6
(England) Alan Glazier 76.94 | 4
3 | (Wales) Leighton Rees 93.94 | 6
(Australia) Barry Atkinson 60.27 | 0
4 | (Scotland) Rab Smith 79.11 | 6
(Republic of Ireland) Patrick Clifford 65.76 | 0
6 | (Sweden) Stefan Lord 77.60 | 6
(Sweden) Kenth Ohlsson 60.58 | 3
8 | (England) Tony Brown 76.07 | 3
(Australia) Tim Brown 76.19 | 6
2 | (England) John Lowe 82.37 | 6
(Scotland) Bobby Semple 75.31 | 1

Quarter-finals (best of 11 legs); 8 February
(United States) Conrad Daniels 81.68 | 4
7 | (United States) Nicky Virachkul 80.76 | 6
5 | (Wales) Alan Evans 94.85 | 3
3 | (Wales) Leighton Rees 97.49 | 6
4 | (Scotland) Rab Smith 78.10 | 3
6 | (Sweden) Stefan Lord 76.88 | 6
(Australia) Tim Brown 82.50 | 1
2 | (England) John Lowe 86.70 | 6

Semi-finals (best of 15 legs); 9 February
7 | (United States) Nicky Virachkul 81.90 | 7
3 | (Wales) Leighton Rees 79.80 | 8
6 | (Sweden) Stefan Lord 73.20 | 4
2 | (England) John Lowe 86.40 | 8

Final (best of 21 legs); 10 February
3 | (Wales) Leighton Rees 92.40 | 11
2 | (England) John Lowe 89.40 | 7
3rd place match (best of 9 legs)
7 | (United States) Nicky Virachkul 71.70 | 5
6 | (Sweden) Stefan Lord 73.20 | 4
