= Nicky Virachkul =

American darts player (1948–1999)

Personal information
- Nickname: "The Thailand Cowboy"
- Born: June 3, 1948 Thailand
- Died: April 17, 1999 (aged 50) Los Angeles, California, U.S.

Sport
- Sport: Darts
- Playing since: 1968
- Darts: 21g Accudarts
- Laterality: Right-handed

Organisation (see split in darts)
- BDO: 1975–1988

WDF major events – best performances
- World Championship: 3rd place: 1978
- World Masters: Semi-final: 1980

Other tournament wins
- Tournament: Years
- Windy City Open WDF World Cup Singles North American Open Dallas Open Camellia Classic: 1978; 1979; 1982; 1983; 1986, 1987

Other achievements
- 1996 National Darts Hall of Fame inductee

Nicky Virachkul (June 3, 1948 – April 17, 1999) was an American professional darts player who competed in the 1970s and 1980s.

== Background ==
Virachkul was from Lampang, Thailand, and was a javelin thrower during high school. He moved to the United States in 1968 to study business administration at Fairleigh Dickinson University in Teaneck, New Jersey. He later became a naturalized citizen.

== Career ==
Virachkul represented the United States internationally in darts tournaments.

He competed at the first Embassy World Darts Championship in 1978, losing narrowly by 7–8 in the semi-final to eventual champion, Leighton Rees. He won third place in a play-off by defeating Stefan Lord. Virachakul reached the quarter-finals on three other occasions: in 1981 (losing to Eric Bristow), 1982 (losing to Bobby George) and 1984 (losing to Dave Whitcombe). Despite his respectable record, it was nevertheless a surprise when he defeated the defending World Champion, Keith Deller, in the first round of the 1984 World Championship. Deller had his revenge in the first round the following year. The 1985 championship was Virachkul's last appearance in the final stages. Despite competing in the first eight World Championships, he never again qualified after the tournament moved to the Lakeside Country Club in 1986.

Virachkul competed in the third WDF World Cup darts tournament in 1979 and won the singles title. In 1980 he reached the semi-finals of the Winmau World Masters. He also won the 1978 Windy City Open, the 1982 North American Open and the 1983 Dallas Open.

Nicky Virachkul was inducted into the National Darts Hall of Fame in 1996.

== Death ==
Suffering from cancer, Virachkul died in 1999 at the age of 50.

== World Championship results ==
=== BDO ===
- 1978: 3rd place (beat Stefan Lord 4–5) (legs)
- 1979: 2nd round (lost to Alan Glazier 1–2) (sets)
- 1980: 2nd round (lost to Bill Lennard 0–2)
- 1981: Quarter-finals (lost to Eric Bristow 0–4)
- 1982: Quarter-finals (lost to Bobby George 1–4)
- 1983: 1st round (lost to Keith Deller 1–2)
- 1984: Quarter-finals (lost to Dave Whitcombe 0–5)
- 1985: 1st round (lost to Keith Deller 0–2)

== Career finals ==
=== WDF major finals: 1 (1 title) ===
Outcome	No.	Year	Championship	Opponent in the final	Score
Winner	1.	1979	World Cup Singles	(Wales) Ceri Morgan	4–3 (l)

== Performance timeline ==
Tournament	1975	1976	1977	1978	1979	1980	1981	1982	1983	1984	1985
BDO World Championship	NYF			SF	2R	2R	QF	QF	1R	QF	1R
World Masters	QF	DNP	3R	3R	2R	SF	3R	QF	2R	4R	DNP
Butlins Grand Masters	NYF		?	SF	DNP	1R	1R	QF	1R	1R	DNP
MFI World Matchplay	NYF									1R	QF

WDF majors performances
Tournament	Event	World Cup 1977	World Cup 1979	World Cup 1981	World Cup 1983
WDF World Cup	Singles	L32	W	L16	L16
WDF World Cup	Pairs	L16	?	?	?
WDF World Cup	Team	QF	SF	QF	QF
WDF World Cup	Overall	8th	RU	5th	4th
