= Tony Brown (darts player) =

English darts player (1945–2022)

Personal information
- Full name: Anthony Brown
- Born: 1 April 1945 Dover, Kent, England
- Died: 22 September 2022 (aged 77)
- Home town: Dover, Kent, England

Sport
- Sport: Darts
- Playing since: 1965
- Darts: 26 Gram
- Laterality: Right-handed
- Walk-on music: "We'll Bring the House Down" by Slade

Organisation (see split in darts)
- BDO: 1976–1984

WDF major events – best performances
- World Championship: 3rd Place: 1979, 1980
- World Masters: Runner Up: 1978

Other tournament wins
- Tournament: Years
- Indoor League British Open: 1977; 1979
Medal record
Men's Darts
Representing England
WDF World Cup
Gold medal – first place	1979 Las Vegas	Men's team
Gold medal – first place	1979 Las Vegas	Men's overall
Gold medal – first place	1981 Nelson	Men's pairs
Gold medal – first place	1981 Nelson	Men's team
Gold medal – first place	1981 Nelson	Men's overall
Bronze medal – third place	1979 Las Vegas	Men's singles
WDF Europe Cup
Gold medal – first place	1980 Ebbw Vale	Men's singles
Gold medal – first place	1980 Ebbw Vale	Men's team
Gold medal – first place	1980 Ebbw Vale	Men's overall
- Updated on 19 October 2022

Anthony Brown (1 April 1945 – 22 September 2022) was an English professional darts player. He came close to winning the world championship on a number of occasions, reaching the World Professional Darts Championships semi-finals four times, losing twice to Eric Bristow and twice to John Lowe.

== Career ==
Brown appeared in the first-ever World Championship in 1978 as the number 8 seed, but surprisingly lost to Australian namesake Tim Brown. Brown then went on to reach the semi-finals of the World Championship for three successive years - 1979, 1980 and 1981. After a surprise second-round defeat in the 1982 Championships, Brown reached the semi-final again in 1983, losing to Bristow.

He also enjoyed success in other major tournaments, winning the televised British Open in 1979 and Yorkshire Television's Indoor League darts competition in 1977. He won the first two Darts World KO Cup tournaments held in Oldham – these were subsequently sponsored by Dry Blackthorn Cider from 1983 to 1989. He defeated Nicky Virachkul in the 1980 final. He also won the WDF Europe Cup Singles event in 1980. Brown reached the final of the prestigious Winmau World Masters in 1978, losing out to Welshman Ronnie Davies.

Brown enjoyed team success with England – winning the WDF World Cup team event in 1979 and 1981 and the WDF World Cup pairs with Cliff Lazarenko in 1981. He also teamed up with Lowe and Bristow to enjoy Nations Cup triples success for England in 1979 and 1980.

Brown was one of the players who helped form the players' association PDPA (Professional Dart Players Association) along with Lowe, Lazarenko and Dave Whitcombe. The association was set up with the intention of promoting more televised tournaments. Although Brown was not part of the darts scene in the 1990s (his last World Championship appearance was at the 1984 BDO World Darts Championship), the PDPA would be instrumental in the formation of the World Darts Council (now Professional Darts Corporation) and would split the game into two organisations.

Brown moved back to his home town of Dover, and was back playing in the local league, the Dover Invitation Darts League.

== World Championship results ==
=== BDO ===
- 1978: First round (lost to Tim Brown 3–6) (legs)
- 1979: Semi-final (lost to John Lowe 2–3); Third place: (beat Alan Evans 2–1) (sets)
- 1980: Semi-final (lost to Eric Bristow 3–4); Third place: (beat Cliff Lazarenko 2–0)
- 1981: Semi-final (lost to John Lowe 1–4); Fourth place: (lost to Cliff Lazarenko 1–2)
- 1982: Second round (lost to Dave Miller 0–2)
- 1983: Semi-final (lost to Eric Bristow 1–5); Fourth place: (lost to Jocky Wilson 0–2)
- 1984: First round (lost to John Lowe 0–2)

== Career Finals ==
=== BDO major finals: 3 (3 runners-up) ===
Outcome	No.	Year	Championship	Opponent in the final	Score (Note: (l) = score in legs, (s) = score in sets.)
Runner-up	1.	1978	Winmau World Masters	(England) Ronnie Davis	1–2 (s)
Runner-up	2.	1978	British Matchplay	(England) John Lowe	1–2 (s)
Runner-up	3.	1979	British Matchplay	(England) Cliff Lazarenko	0–2 (s)

=== WDF major finals: 1 (1 title) ===
Legend
Europe Cup (1–0)

Outcome	No.	Year	Championship	Opponent in the final	Score
Winner	1.	1980	Europe Cup Singles	(England) Eric Bristow	4–0 (l)

== Performance timeline ==
Tournament	1977	1978	1979	1980	1981	1982	1983	1984
BDO World Championship	NYF	1R	SF	SF	SF	2R	SF	1R
Winmau World Masters	QF	F	3R	3R	3R	4R	2R	DNP
British Matchplay	DNP	F	F	SF	QF	DNP	QF	DNP
British Professional	Not held				2R	1R	1R	DNP
Butlins Grand Masters	DNP		QF	1R	DNP		QF	DNP
News of the World	???	RR	???					

WDF majors performances
Tournament	Event	World Cup 1977	Euro Cup 1978	World Cup 1979	Euro Cup 1980	World Cup 1981
WDF World Cup & WDF Europe Cup	Singles	L64	DNP	SF	W	L16
WDF World Cup & WDF Europe Cup	Pairs	QF	DNP	RU	SF	W
WDF World Cup & WDF Europe Cup	Team	RU	DNP	W	W	W
WDF World Cup & WDF Europe Cup	Overall	RU	DNP	W	W	W

Performance Table Legend
DNP	Did not play at the event	DNQ	Did not qualify for the event	NYF	Not yet founded	#R	lost in the early rounds of the tournament (WR = Wildcard round, RR = Round robin)
QF	lost in the quarter-finals	SF	lost in the semi-finals	F	lost in the final	W	won the tournament
