= Tim Brown (darts player) =

Australian darts player

Personal information
- Nickname: "Brownie"
- Born: 6 July 1944 (age 82) Mandurah, Australia

Sport
- Sport: Darts
- Playing since: 1964
- Darts: 18g
- Laterality: Right-handed

Organisation (see split in darts)
- BDO: 1976–1988

WDF major events – best performances
- World Championship: Quarter-final: 1978
- World Masters: Last 64: 1977

Other tournament wins
- Tournament: Years
- Australian National Championship Australian Grand Masters: 1976, 1979; 1982

Tim Brown (born 6 July 1944) is an Australian former professional darts player. He used the nickname Brownie.

== Career ==
Brown made three BDO World Darts Championship appearances with his best performance being in 1978. He also played in 1981 and 1982 but suffered first round defeats in both years to Leighton Rees and Joe Dodd respectively.

Brown quit the BDO in 1988.

== World Championship results ==
=== BDO ===
- 1978: Quarter-final (lost to John Lowe 1–6) (legs)
- 1981: 1st round (lost to Leighton Rees 0–2) (sets)
- 1982: 1st round (lost to Joe Dodd 1–2)
