= BDO World Darts Championship =

Darts championship

BDO World Professional Darts Championship
- Founded: 1978
- First season: 1978
- Folded: 2020
- Organizing body: BDO category Major; WDF category Major
- Country: England
- Venues: Indigo at The O2, London (2020); Lakeside, Frimley Green (1986–2019); Jollees, Stoke-on-Trent (1979–1985); Heart of the Midlands, Nottingham (1978)
- Last champions: (Wales) Wayne Warren (men's) (Japan) Mikuru Suzuki (women's) (Republic of Ireland) Keane Barry (youth) (2020)
- Broadcaster: Eurosport
- Tournament format: Sets

The BDO World Darts Championship was a professional darts tournament organised by the British Darts Organisation (BDO) and held annually from 1978 to 2020.

The championship was first held at the Heart of the Midlands Nightclub in the English city of Nottingham. The following year it moved to the Jollees Cabaret Club, Stoke, where it stayed until 1985. From 1986 to 2019, it was held at the Lakeside Country Club in Frimley Green, Surrey. In 2020, the tournament was held at Indigo, part of the O2 entertainment district in London.

It was the only World Darts Championship until the 1993 split in darts, when 16 players, among them seven former champions, left the BDO and set up a rival darts circuit under the auspices of the World Darts Council (later the Professional Darts Corporation). The WDC/PDC staged its own annual World Championship from 1994 onwards.

From its inception, the tournament was sponsored by Embassy cigarettes, a branch of Imperial Tobacco, and was thus often colloquially known as the Embassy. After the ban on tobacco advertising in the UK from the end of 2003, the event was sponsored by its venue, the Lakeside Country Club, from 2004 onwards. The final edition, in 2020, was unable to find a sponsor.

After the collapse of the British Darts Organisation in September 2020, the World Darts Federation announced plans to launch the WDF World Darts Championship, which took place for the first time in 2022.

== History ==
The World Darts Championship was the brainchild of Mike Watterson, a sports promoter who had created the UK Snooker Championship and moved the World Snooker Championship to the Crucible Theatre in 1977. Watterson came up with the idea whilst sitting in a barber's chair waiting for a haircut. John Lowe, a friend of Watterson, convinced him that such an event would be easy to stage and suggested contacting Olly Croft, head of the British Darts Organisation, to run it.

The inaugural event was staged at the Heart of the Midlands club in Nottingham. Embassy cigarettes, which also sponsored the World Snooker Championship, put up the £10,500 prize fund and it would be broadcast on BBC2. Ten top players (Eric Bristow, John Lowe, Leighton Rees, Rab Smith, Alan Evans, Stefan Lord, Tim Brown, Bobby Semple, Nicky Virachkul and Barry Atkinson) were invited, with the remaining places going to qualifiers. The first tournament used the legs format for its matches, but from 1979 onwards Watterson introduced the sets and legs format, which has been used in darts ever since. It was won by Rees, who beat Lowe in the final.

In 1983, Keith Deller, a 23-year-old qualifier from Ipswich, beat the world's top three players back-to-back: John Lowe (world no. 3) in the quarter-final; reigning champion and World No. 2 Jocky Wilson in the semi-final, before an epic deciding set win against World no. 1 Eric Bristow in the final, to produce one of the greatest upsets in the sport's history.

In 1990 Singaporean (then-representing the USA) player Paul Lim hit the tournament's only 9-dart finish in the second round against Irishman Jack McKenna to win a bonus of £52,000 which was more than the eventual champion Phil Taylor received.

The finals of 1992, 1998 and 1999 all went into a deciding set play off, having reached 5 sets all and 2 legs all. In 1992, Phil Taylor defeated Mike Gregory in a sudden death leg, having reached 5 legs apiece. In 1998 Raymond van Barneveld beat Richie Burnett 4–2 in legs in the deciding set. Van Barneveld then repeated the same final set scoreline the following year against Ronnie Baxter.

In the final in 2007 Martin Adams was 6 sets up and, after the comfort break, Phill Nixon responded by winning the next 6 consecutive sets. Adams held on to take victory in the 13th and deciding set, to win the title that had eluded him for 14 years.

In 2019, Glen Durrant became the second player to win three consecutive BDO Men's World Championships after Eric Bristow between 1984 and 1986, while Mikuru Suzuki became the first Asian world darts champion in any form.

In 2020 the tournament was staged at the Indigo at The O2 in London. It was the first BDO World Darts Championship not held at the Lakeside Country Club since 1985. Wayne Warren became the oldest player ever to win a world title. It was also the last World Darts Championship organised by the BDO before the collapse of the company. The World Darts Federation announced plans to launch the WDF World Championship.

== Final results and statistics ==
Year	Champion	Av.	Score	Runner-Up	Av.	Prize Money			Venue	Sponsor
Year	Champion	Av.	Score	Runner-Up	Av.	Total	Ch.	R.-Up	Venue	Sponsor
1978	(Wales) Leighton Rees	92.40	11 – 7 legs	(England) John Lowe	89.40	£10,500	£3,000	£1,700	Heart of the Midlands Club, Nottingham	Embassy
1979	(England) John Lowe	87.42	5 – 0 sets	(Wales) Leighton Rees	76.62	£15,000	£4,500	£2,000	Jollees, Stoke-on-Trent	Embassy
1980	(England) Eric Bristow	88.10	5 – 3	(England) Bobby George	86.49	£15,000	£4,500	£2,000	Jollees, Stoke-on-Trent	Embassy
1981	(England) Eric Bristow (2)	86.10	5 – 3	(England) John Lowe	81.00	£23,300	£5,500	£2,500	Jollees, Stoke-on-Trent	Embassy
1982	(Scotland) Jocky Wilson	88.10	5 – 3	(England) John Lowe	84.30	£28,000	£6,500	£3,000	Jollees, Stoke-on-Trent	Embassy
1983	(England) Keith Deller	90.00	6 – 5	(England) Eric Bristow	93.90	£33,050	£8,000	£3,500	Jollees, Stoke-on-Trent	Embassy
1984	(England) Eric Bristow (3)	97.50	7 – 1	(England) Dave Whitcombe	90.60	£38,500	£9,000	£4,000	Jollees, Stoke-on-Trent	Embassy
1985	(England) Eric Bristow (4)	97.50	6 – 2	(England) John Lowe	93.12	£43,000	£10,000	£5,000	Jollees, Stoke-on-Trent	Embassy
1986	(England) Eric Bristow (5)	94.47	6 – 0	(England) Dave Whitcombe	90.45	£52,500	£12,000	£6,000	Lakeside Country Club, Frimley Green, Surrey	Embassy
1987	(England) John Lowe (2)	90.63	6 – 4	(England) Eric Bristow	94.29	£60,300	£14,000	£7,000	Lakeside Country Club, Frimley Green, Surrey	Embassy
1988	(England) Bob Anderson	92.70	6 – 4	(England) John Lowe	92.07	£71,600	£16,000	£8,000	Lakeside Country Club, Frimley Green, Surrey	Embassy
1989	(Scotland) Jocky Wilson (2)	94.32	6 – 4	(England) Eric Bristow	90.66	£86,900	£20,000	£10,000	Lakeside Country Club, Frimley Green, Surrey	Embassy
1990	(England) Phil Taylor	97.47	6 – 1	(England) Eric Bristow	93.00	£153,200	£24,000	£12,000	Lakeside Country Club, Frimley Green, Surrey	Embassy
1991	(England) Dennis Priestley	92.57	6 – 0	(England) Eric Bristow	84.15	£110,500	£26,000	£13,000	Lakeside Country Club, Frimley Green, Surrey	Embassy
1992	(England) Phil Taylor (2)	97.58	6 – 5	(England) Mike Gregory	94.42	£119,500	£28,000	£14,000	Lakeside Country Club, Frimley Green, Surrey	Embassy
1993	(England) John Lowe (3)	83.97	6 – 3	(England) Alan Warriner	82.32	£128,500	£30,000	£15,000	Lakeside Country Club, Frimley Green, Surrey	Embassy
1994	(Canada) John Part	82.44	6 – 0	(England) Bobby George	80.31	£136,100	£32,000	£16,000	Lakeside Country Club, Frimley Green, Surrey	Embassy
1995	(Wales) Richie Burnett	93.63	6 – 3	(Netherlands) Raymond van Barneveld	91.23	£143,000	£34,000	£17,000	Lakeside Country Club, Frimley Green, Surrey	Embassy
1996	(England) Steve Beaton	90.27	6 – 3	(Wales) Richie Burnett	88.05	£150,000	£36,000	£18,000	Lakeside Country Club, Frimley Green, Surrey	Embassy
1997	(Scotland) Les Wallace	92.19	6 – 3	(Wales) Marshall James	92.01	£158,000	£38,000	£19,000	Lakeside Country Club, Frimley Green, Surrey	Embassy
1998	(Netherlands) Raymond van Barneveld	93.96	6 – 5	(Wales) Richie Burnett	97.14	£166,000	£40,000	£20,000	Lakeside Country Club, Frimley Green, Surrey	Embassy
1999	(Netherlands) Raymond van Barneveld (2)	94.35	6 – 5	(England) Ronnie Baxter	94.65	£174,000	£42,000	£21,000	Lakeside Country Club, Frimley Green, Surrey	Embassy
2000	(England) Ted Hankey	92.40	6 – 0	(England) Ronnie Baxter	88.35	£182,000	£44,000	£22,000	Lakeside Country Club, Frimley Green, Surrey	Embassy
2001	(England) John Walton	95.55	6 – 2	(England) Ted Hankey	94.86	£189,000	£46,000	£23,000	Lakeside Country Club, Frimley Green, Surrey	Embassy
2002	(Australia) Tony David	93.57	6 – 4	(England) Mervyn King	89.67	£197,000	£48,000	£24,000	Lakeside Country Club, Frimley Green, Surrey	Embassy
2003	(Netherlands) Raymond van Barneveld (3)	94.86	6 – 3	(Wales) Ritchie Davies	90.66	£205,000	£50,000	£25,000	Lakeside Country Club, Frimley Green, Surrey	Embassy
2004	(England) Andy Fordham	97.08	6 – 3	(England) Mervyn King	91.02	£201,000	£50,000	£25,000	Lakeside Country Club, Frimley Green, Surrey	Lakeside; Country; Club
2005	(Netherlands) Raymond van Barneveld (4)	96.78	6 – 2	(England) Martin Adams	91.35	£201,000	£50,000	£25,000	Lakeside Country Club, Frimley Green, Surrey	Lakeside; Country; Club
2006	(Netherlands) Jelle Klaasen	90.42	7 – 5	(Netherlands) Raymond van Barneveld	93.06	£211,000	£60,000	£25,000	Lakeside Country Club, Frimley Green, Surrey	Lakeside; Country; Club
2007	(England) Martin Adams	90.30	7 – 6	(England) Phill Nixon	87.09	£226,000	£70,000	£30,000	Lakeside Country Club, Frimley Green, Surrey	Lakeside; Country; Club
2008	(Wales) Mark Webster	92.07	7 – 5	(Australia) Simon Whitlock	93.92	£246,000	£85,000	£30,000	Lakeside Country Club, Frimley Green, Surrey	Lakeside; Country; Club
2009	(England) Ted Hankey (2)	91.46	7 – 6	(England) Tony O'Shea	90.54	£256,000	£95,000	£30,000	Lakeside Country Club, Frimley Green, Surrey	Lakeside; Country; Club
2010	(England) Martin Adams (2)	95.01	7 – 5	(England) Dave Chisnall	93.42	£261,000	£100,000	£30,000	Lakeside Country Club, Frimley Green, Surrey	Lakeside; Country; Club
2011	(England) Martin Adams (3)	92.13	7 – 5	(England) Dean Winstanley	89.08	£261,000	£100,000	£30,000	Lakeside Country Club, Frimley Green, Surrey	Lakeside; Country; Club
2012	(Netherlands) Christian Kist	90.00	7 – 5	(England) Tony O'Shea	87.78	£258,000	£100,000	£30,000	Lakeside Country Club, Frimley Green, Surrey	Lakeside; Country; Club
2013	(England) Scott Waites	86.43	7 – 1	(England) Tony O'Shea	81.90	£261,000	£100,000	£30,000	Lakeside Country Club, Frimley Green, Surrey	Lakeside; Country; Club
2014	(England) Stephen Bunting	96.18	7 – 4	(England) Alan Norris	92.19	£300,000	£100,000	£35,000	Lakeside Country Club, Frimley Green, Surrey	Lakeside; Country; Club
2015	(England) Scott Mitchell	92.61	7 – 6	(England) Martin Adams	92.55	£300,000	£100,000	£35,000	Lakeside Country Club, Frimley Green, Surrey	Lakeside; Country; Club
2016	(England) Scott Waites (2)	87.54	7 – 1	(Canada) Jeff Smith	84.99	£300,000	£100,000	£35,000	Lakeside Country Club, Frimley Green, Surrey	Lakeside; Country; Club
2017	(England) Glen Durrant	93.48	7 – 3	(Netherlands) Danny Noppert	93.30	£300,000	£100,000	£35,000	Lakeside Country Club, Frimley Green, Surrey	Lakeside; Country; Club
2018	(England) Glen Durrant (2)	93.97	7 – 6	(England) Mark McGeeney	86.31	£300,000	£100,000	£35,000	Lakeside Country Club, Frimley Green, Surrey	Lakeside; Country; Club
2019	(England) Glen Durrant (3)	95.19	7 – 3	(England) Scott Waites	91.38	£300,000	£100,000	£35,000	Lakeside Country Club, Frimley Green, Surrey	Lakeside; Country; Club
2020	(Wales) Wayne Warren	93.72	7 – 4	(Wales) Jim Williams	94.53	£127,000	£23,000	£10,000	Indigo at The O2, London	BDO

== Finalists ==
Player	1st	2nd
(England) Eric Bristow	5	5
(Netherlands) Raymond van Barneveld	4	2
(England) John Lowe	3	5
(England) Martin Adams	3	2
(England) Glen Durrant	3	0
(England) Scott Waites	2	1
(England) Ted Hankey	2	1
(England) Phil Taylor	2	0
(Scotland) Jocky Wilson	2	0
(Wales) Richie Burnett	1	2
(Wales) Leighton Rees	1	1
(Wales) Wayne Warren	1	0
(England) Stephen Bunting	1	0
(England) Scott Mitchell	1	0
(Netherlands) Christian Kist	1	0
(Wales) Mark Webster	1	0
(England) Keith Deller	1	0
(Netherlands) Jelle Klaasen	1	0
(England) Andy Fordham	1	0
(Australia) Tony David	1	0
(England) John Walton	1	0
(Scotland) Les Wallace	1	0
(England) Steve Beaton	1	0
(Canada) John Part	1	0
(England) Dennis Priestley	1	0
(England) Bob Anderson	1	0
(England) Tony O'Shea	0	3
(England) Ronnie Baxter	0	2
(England) Mervyn King	0	2
(England) Dave Whitcombe	0	2
(England) Bobby George	0	2
(England) Alan Norris	0	1
(England) Dave Chisnall	0	1
(England) Dean Winstanley	0	1
(Wales) Ritchie Davies	0	1
(Australia) Simon Whitlock	0	1
(England) Phill Nixon	0	1
(Wales) Marshall James	0	1
(England) Mike Gregory	0	1
(England) Alan Warriner	0	1
(Canada) Jeff Smith	0	1
(Netherlands) Danny Noppert	0	1
(England) Mark McGeeney	0	1
(Wales) Jim Williams	0	1

== Nine-dart finish ==
Player	Year (+Round)	Method	Opponent	Result
(United States) Paul Lim	1990, 2nd Round	3 x T20; 3 x T20; T20, T19, D12	(Republic of Ireland) Jack McKenna	3–2

== Averages ==
Since the breakaway of the PDC players, there has been much debate about the relative merits of the players within each organisation. The debate often focuses on the three-dart averages of players in matches.

Since the BDO Championship started in 1978, there have been 21 occasions where a player has achieved a three-dart average in excess of 100 during a match. Keith Deller was the first player to achieve an average of 100, in the quarter-final of 1985 against John Lowe, although he lost the match. It was not until Phil Taylor's semi-final of 1990 that another player managed a 100 average. Raymond van Barneveld has achieved the feat six times.

Ten highest BDO World Championship one-match averages
Average	Player	Year (+ Round)	Opponent	Result
103.83	(Netherlands) Raymond van Barneveld	2004, Quarter-Final	(England) John Walton	5–1
102.63	(England) Dennis Priestley	1993, Last 32	(Scotland) Jocky Wilson	3–0
101.67	(England) Mervyn King	2002, Quarter-Final	(Netherlands) Raymond van Barneveld	5–3
101.55	(England) Ted Hankey	1998, Last 32	(Australia) Wayne Weening	3–0
101.40	(Finland) Marko Pusa	2001, Last 16	(England) Jez Porter	3–1
101.28	(England) Martin Adams	2002, Quarter-Final	(England) Wayne Jones	5–1
101.10	(Netherlands) Raymond van Barneveld	2002, Quarter-Final	(England) Mervyn King	3–5
100.92	(Netherlands) Raymond van Barneveld	2005, Last 16	(Scotland) Mike Veitch	3–1
100.92	(England) Glen Durrant	2018, Quarter-Final	(Wales) Jim Williams	5–4
100.83	(Netherlands) Raymond van Barneveld	2002, Last 32	(England) Bobby George	3–1

Five highest losing averages
Average	Player	Year (+ Round)	Opponent	Result
101.10	(Netherlands) Raymond van Barneveld	2002, Quarter-Final	(England) Mervyn King	3–5
100.29	(England) Keith Deller	1985, Quarter-Final	(England) John Lowe	2–4
99.87	(England) Glen Durrant	2015, Semi-Final	(England) Martin Adams	5–6
99.57	(Czech Republic) Karel Sedláček	2015, Last 32	(England) Glen Durrant	1–3
99.45	(England) Robbie Widdows	1999, Last 32	(England) Kevin Painter	0–3

Different players with a 100+ match average - updated 6/5/18
Player	Total	Highest Av.	Year (+ Round)
(Netherlands) Raymond van Barneveld	6	103.83	2004, Quarter-Final
(England) Martin Adams	3	101.28	2002, Quarter-Final
(England) Ted Hankey	2	101.55	1998, Last 32
(England) Dennis Priestley	1	102.63	1993, Last 32
(England) Mervyn King	1	101.67	2002, Quarter-Final
(Finland) Marko Pusa	1	101.40	2001, Last 32
(England) Glen Durrant	1	100.92	2018, Quarter-Final
(England) Phil Taylor	1	100.80	1990, Semi-Final
(England) Darryl Fitton	1	100.71	2008, Last 16
(England) Stephen Bunting	1	100.65	2014, Last 16
(England) John Walton	1	100.62	2001, Last 32
(England) Keith Deller	1	100.29	1985, Quarter-Final
(England) Chris Mason	1	100.02	2000, Last 32

Five highest tournament averages (min 3 matches)
Average	Player	Year
100.88	(Netherlands) Raymond van Barneveld	2002
97.96	(Netherlands) Raymond van Barneveld	2004
97.62	(Netherlands) Raymond van Barneveld	2003
97.49	(Netherlands) Raymond van Barneveld	2005
97.42	(England) Glen Durrant	2015

== Women's Championship ==
The women's World Championship started at the Lakeside in 2001 and Trina Gulliver has won ten championships. Her seventh title in 2007 took her overall record at the Lakeside to 20 match wins and having only dropped four sets in the history of the championship – one each in the finals of 2001, 2002 and 2007 and one in the quarter final of 2003. She managed a long run of 13 consecutive matches without dropping a single set, which started the semi-final of 2003 and ended in the final of 2007.

In 2008, Anastasia Dobromyslova won the championship, becoming the first player other than Trina Gulliver to take the title. Following her appearance at the Grand Slam of Darts in November 2008, Anastasia Dobromyslova joined the Professional Darts Corporation, hence leaving the BDO and did not defend her title. 2009 saw five-time runner-up Francis Hoenselaar complete the Masters/World Championship double by beating Gulliver 2–1 in the final. 2012 was the first final without Gulliver, who lost in the semi-final to the eventual champion Dobromyslova.

The finals:

Year	Champion (average in final)	Sets	Runner-up (average in final)	Prizepool
2001	(England) Trina Gulliver (83.97)	2 – 1	(England) Mandy Solomons (79.11)	£6,000
2002	(England) Trina Gulliver (84.36)	2 – 1	(Netherlands) Francis Hoenselaar (82.95)	£8,000
2003	(England) Trina Gulliver (84.93)	2 – 0	(Scotland) Anne Kirk (70.20)	£10,000
2004	(England) Trina Gulliver (87.03)	2 – 0	(Netherlands) Francis Hoenselaar (85.44)	£10,000
2005	(England) Trina Gulliver (79.68)	2 – 0	(Netherlands) Francis Hoenselaar (73.89)	£10,000
2006	(England) Trina Gulliver (73.80)	2 – 0	(Netherlands) Francis Hoenselaar (70.26)	£12,000
2007	(England) Trina Gulliver (80.61)	2 – 1	(Netherlands) Francis Hoenselaar (79.23)	£12,000
2008	(Russia) Anastasia Dobromyslova (81.54)	2 – 0	(England) Trina Gulliver (71.64)	£12,000
2009	(Netherlands) Francis Hoenselaar (77.39)	2 – 1	(England) Trina Gulliver (75.19)	£12,000
2010	(England) Trina Gulliver (80.52)	2 – 0	(Wales) Rhian Edwards (68.25)	£12,000
2011	(England) Trina Gulliver (73.95)	2 – 0	(Wales) Rhian Edwards (73.86)	£16,000
2012	(Russia) Anastasia Dobromyslova (73.95)	2 – 1	(England) Deta Hedman (74.13)	£16,000
2013	(Russia) Anastasia Dobromyslova (82.29)	2 – 1	(England) Lisa Ashton (80.40)	£16,000
2014	(England) Lisa Ashton (84.81)	3 – 2	(England) Deta Hedman (77.79)	£29,000
2015	(England) Lisa Ashton (83.22)	3 – 1	(England) Fallon Sherrock (83.76)	£29,000
2016	(England) Trina Gulliver (72.93)	3 – 2	(England) Deta Hedman (75.51)	£29,000
2017	(England) Lisa Ashton (81.81)	3 – 0	(Australia) Corrine Hammond (73.53)	£29,000
2018	(England) Lisa Ashton (89.80)	3 – 1	(Russia) Anastasia Dobromyslova (81.83)	£29,000
2019	(Japan) Mikuru Suzuki (90.12)	3 – 0	(England) Lorraine Winstanley (78.82)	£29,000
2020	(Japan) Mikuru Suzuki (83.39)	3 – 0	(England) Lisa Ashton (85.00)	£26,500

=== Finalists ===
Player	1st	2nd
(England) Trina Gulliver	10	2
(England) Lisa Ashton	4	2
(Russia) Anastasia Dobromyslova	3	1
(Japan) Mikuru Suzuki	2	0
(Netherlands) Francis Hoenselaar	1	5
(England) Deta Hedman	0	3
(Wales) Rhian Edwards	0	2
(England) Mandy Solomons	0	1
(Scotland) Anne Kirk	0	1
(England) Fallon Sherrock	0	1
(Australia) Corrine Hammond	0	1
(England) Lorraine Winstanley	0	1

=== Averages ===
Ten highest BDO Women's World Championship one-match averages
Average	Player	Year (+ Round)	Opponent	Result
95.97	(England) Trina Gulliver	2006, Semi-Final	(England) Clare Bywaters	2–0
94.92	(England) Trina Gulliver	2001, Semi-Final	(England) Crissy Manley	2–0
90.24	(England) Trina Gulliver	2004, Semi-Final	(Netherlands) Karin Krappen	2–0
90.18	(England) Lisa Ashton	2015, Quarter-Final	(England) Trina Gulliver	2–0
90.12	(Japan) Mikuru Suzuki	2019, Final	(England) Lorraine Winstanley	3–0
89.80	(England) Lisa Ashton	2018, Final	(Russia) Anastasia Dobromyslova	3–1
89.67	(England) Fallon Sherrock	2019, Last 16	(Australia) Corrine Hammond	2–0
87.30	(England) Lisa Ashton	2015, Semi-Final	(Netherlands) Sharon Prins	2–0
87.06	(England) Lisa Ashton	2017, Last 16	(Netherlands) Sharon Prins	2–0
87.03	(England) Trina Gulliver	2004, Final	(Netherlands) Francis Hoenselaar	2–0

Five highest losing averages
Average	Player	Year (+ Round)	Opponent	Result
86.46	(Wales) Rhian Griffiths	2017, Last 16	(Russia) Anastasia Dobromyslova	1–2
85.44	(Netherlands) Francis Hoenselaar	2004, Final	(England) Trina Gulliver	0–2
85.00	(England) Lisa Ashton	2020, Final	(Japan) Mikuru Suzuki	0–3
83.76	(England) Fallon Sherrock	2015, Final	(England) Lisa Ashton	1–3
82.95	(Netherlands) Francis Hoenselaar	2002, Final	(England) Trina Gulliver	1–2

Five highest tournament averages (min 2 matches)
Average	Player	Year
89.45	(England) Trina Gulliver	2001
88.11	(England) Trina Gulliver	2004
85.61	(England) Lisa Ashton	2015
85.22	(England) Trina Gulliver	2006
83.86	(England) Lisa Ashton	2017

== Youth Championship ==
Year	Champion (average in final)	Sets	Runner-up (average in final)
1986	(England) Mark Day	3 – 1	(England) Lee Woodrow
1987	(Australia) Rowan Barry	3 – 2	(Singapore) Harith Lim
2015	(Netherlands) Colin Roelofs (76.41)	3 – 0	(England) Harry Ward (70.68)
2016	(England) Joshua Richardson (75.09)	3 – 2	(Republic of Ireland) Jordan Boyce (69.63)
2017	(Netherlands) Justin van Tergouw (88.20)	3 – 0	(Scotland) Nathan Girvan (74.55)
2018	(Netherlands) Justin van Tergouw (93.04)	3 – 1	(Republic of Ireland) Killian Heffernan (82.29)
2019	(England) Leighton Bennett (86.65)	3 – 0	(Scotland) Nathan Girvan (76.56)
2020	(Republic of Ireland) Keane Barry (90.54)	3 – 0	(England) Leighton Bennett (84.24)

=== Finalists ===
Player	1st	2nd
(Netherlands) Justin van Tergouw	2	0
(England) Leighton Bennett	1	1
(Netherlands) Colin Roelofs	1	0
(England) Joshua Richardson	1	0
(England) Mark Day	1	0
(Australia) Rowan Barry	1	0
(Republic of Ireland) Keane Barry	1	0
(Scotland) Nathan Girvan	0	2
(England) Harry Ward	0	1
(Republic of Ireland) Jordan Boyce	0	1
(Republic of Ireland) Killian Heffernan	0	1
(England) Lee Woodrow	0	1
(Singapore) Harith Lim	0	1

== Records ==
Since the split in darts two versions of the world championship have existed since 1994, this record section relates specifically to achievements in the BDO version.

Most titles: Eric Bristow 5. Raymond van Barneveld has won four titles
Most finals: Eric Bristow 10. John Lowe appeared in eight finals and Raymond van Barneveld reached the final six times
Most appearances: Martin Adams 26. John Lowe and Eric Bristow appeared in the first 16 tournaments, but the split in darts prevented them from increasing that total. Adams' appearance at the 2010 tournament surpassed their record.
Youngest champion: Jelle Klaasen 21 years 90 days (2006)
Youngest competitor: Leighton Bennett 14 years 4 days (2020)
Oldest champion: Wayne Warren 57 years 219 days (2020)

== Television coverage ==
=== BBC Sport ===
The tournament was broadcast in the UK by BBC Sport on television for nearly 40 years, from its inception in 1978 until the decision to drop the coverage after the 2016 tournament. The BBC's coverage was led by David Vine (1978), Peter Purves (1979–1983), Tony Gubba (1984–1990), David Icke (1989–1990), Eamonn Holmes (1991–1992), Dougie Donnelly (1993–1998), John Inverdale (2000) and Ray Stubbs (1999 and 2001–2009). Twice world finalist Bobby George was a pundit on the BBC's coverage from 1998. Colin Murray succeeded Stubbs as presenter from 2010–2016. Murray was assisted by Rob Walker.

Tony Green was the longest-serving member of the BBC commentary team, covering the event from the first championship in 1978 until the end of the BBC's coverage in 2016. As the BBC shared coverage and commentators from 2012 until 2016, Green was also heard on ESPN and BT Sport in later years. He only missed the event once during his 38-year career due to illness in 2011 and he was replaced by BBC Radio 5 Live's Vassos Alexander. Alexander then stayed in the commentary box every year until 2016.

The rest of the commentary team changed over the years with David Vine (1978), Sid Waddell (1978–1994), Tony Green (1978-2016), 1994 BDO world champion John Part (1995–2007) and David Croft who covered the tournament for 10 years on BBC TV and radio until 2012. He was replaced by Jim Proudfoot of talkSPORT in 2013, who went on to cover the tournament in 2014, 2015, 2017 and 2018 with different broadcasters. John Rawling began commentating in 2014 with BBC/BT and was still part of the commentary team as coverage switched to Eurosport/Quest in 2019. The rest of the commentary team has included BDO players Bobby George, Martin Adams, Trina Gulliver, Tony O'Shea and Scott Mitchell.

For several years between 1989 and 2001, the Championship was often the only tournament shown on terrestrial television in the UK.

From 2005, viewers were able to see every dart live at the World Championship, when the BBC introduced interactive coverage on its BBC Red Button service. From 2012, they began to reduce their coverage as they surrendered their exclusive coverage for the first time in the UK. ESPN took over the live broadcasting of the evening sessions, although the BBC held on to exclusively live coverage of the final.

The BBC regained exclusive coverage for the 2014 tournament, but resumed a shared broadcasting agreement to cover the 2015 and 2016 events with BT who covered every evening session in the tournament. John Rawling, Vassos Alexander, Tony Green and George Riley provided the commentary for both broadcasters in 2015 and 2016 - Jim Proudfoot was an additional commentator in 2015.

The BBC contract expired after the 2016 final and they opted to drop the tournament, instead covering a new PDC tournament, the Champions League of Darts in September 2016. The free-to-air rights from 2017 were taken up by Channel 4.

=== ESPN ===
After being broadcast exclusively on the BBC in the UK for 34 years, ESPN began sharing coverage of the tournament in 2012. Ray Stubbs was confirmed as their host. ESPN host Nat Coombs was also part of the presentation team. Both broadcasters used the same commentary team – Tony Green, David Croft and Vassos Alexander for 2012 and Jim Proudfoot replacing Croft for 2013. ESPN broadcast the evening sessions from the opening day until the quarter finals, as well as the second semi-final live. ESPN showed recorded highlights of the final. Following the launch of BT Sport, which acquired all of ESPN's sporting rights, coverage was dropped from ESPN and the entire 2014 championship was shown exclusively live by the BBC.

=== BT Sport ===
BT Sport covered the event between 2015 and 2018, first of all sharing broadcasting arrangements with the BBC in 2015 and 2016, then with Channel 4 in 2017 and 2018. They had exclusive live coverage of all the evening sessions, plus the second semi-final across their four years broadcasting the event. BT broadcast the final live in all four years of the coverage, although it was shared live coverage with their broadcast partners (BBC 2015-2016 and Channel 4 2017-2018)

BT Sport welcomed back Ray Stubbs as main host in 2015 and 2016, who returned to Lakeside coverage having fronted the BBC's coverage in 1999 and from 2001–2009 and also for ESPN (2012-2013). Stubbs hosted alongside 2-time champion Ted Hankey who returned to the BDO in 2014 but just missed out on a qualifying spot for Lakeside 2015. Roving reporters were Helen Skelton in 2015 and Reshmin Chowdhury in 2016. Commentators were shared by broadcasters during BT's four year coverage. John Rawling and Vassos Alexander broadcast commentary throughout BT's four-year coverage, Jim Proudfoot covered the event in 2015, 2017 and 2018. George Riley and Tony Green covered the event in 2015 and 2016, with Green retiring after the 2016 event, after the BBC ended their coverage.

Ray Stubbs left BT Sport for Talksport 2 during 2016, and was replaced by Matt Smith for the 2017 and 2018 events, with Chris Mason acting as their analyst.

=== Channel 4 ===
Channel 4 signed a two-year deal to cover the 2017 and 2018 championships, sharing the event with BT Sport. Their coverage was presented by Rob Walker, alongside PDC professional Paul Nicholson and BDO Ladies' player Deta Hedman. Bobby George presented features. Commentary was provided again from Jim Proudfoot, John Rawling & Vassos Alexander.

=== Eurosport and Quest ===
Prior to the 2019 championship, the BDO secured a new 3-year deal with Eurosport with coverage being shown on both the broadcasters main subscription channel and free-to-air on Quest. As with the previous years the afternoon sessions were shown free to air with Quest simulcasting Eurosport coverage with highlights of the evening sessions also being shown on Quest. Eurosport covered every session with both broadcasters showing the final live. The coverage was presented by Nat Coombs with Georgie Bingham also reporting on the event. Punditry and commentary for the tournament were provided by John Rawling, Chris Mason, Paul Nicholson, Martin Adams and Tony O'Shea. The Eurosport contract finished 1 year early due to the BDO going into liquidation in September 2020.

=== International coverage ===
Dutch television station SBS6 broadcast the event since 1998, as Dutch players have become more prominent in the world game. SBS6's contract to cover the event ran until 2008.

=== Viewing figures ===
UK viewing figures for World Championship final data provided by the Broadcasters' Audience Research Board UK.

..
2015 2,000,000
2014 3,500,000
2013 2,100,000
2012 2,370,000
2011 2,330,000
2010 3,100,000
2009 1,830,000
2008 3,010,000
2007 3,300,000
2006 3,620,000
2005 2,550,000
2004 3,410,000
2003 2,810,000
2002 2,460,000
2001 3,680,000
2000 3,700,000
1999 4,060,000
