= Jollees =

UK music and cabaret venue

Coordinates: 52.987°N 2.133°W

- Interactive map of Jollees
- Location: Stoke-on-Trent, England
- Type: Live Music, Cabaret
- Capacity: 300

Website
- Official website

Jollees was a live music and cabaret venue in Longton, Stoke-on-Trent, United Kingdom. The venue was re-established in March 2016, after having closed in 1992. The original venue was opened in October 1973 and was the largest capacity cabaret venue in the UK in the 1970s. It also hosted the World Professional Darts Championship from 1979 to 1985.

== Opening ==
The venue had previously been a restaurant and bowling alley. Construction began in late 1972, after the venue's alcohol licence application had been approved, and cost £200,000. The opening night was attended by 1,600 people, including World Cup winning England international footballers Geoff Hurst and Gordon Banks. Merseybeat group The Fourmost and comedians Little and Large were the headliners. The club used a jester as its logo.

== Cabaret venue ==
Its capacity of 1,790 made it the country's biggest cabaret venue in the 1970s. Its location in one of England's smaller cities meant that some acts were initially reluctant to appear and only did so after their peers had performed there.

The venue's hosts included the main host, comedian Mel Scholes, Ian 'Sludge' Lees and Pete Conway, the father of pop star Robbie Williams. Acts who appeared at the venue included Cliff Richard, Roy Orbison, Tommy Cooper, Bob Monkhouse, Norman Wisdom, Cannon and Ball, Freddie Starr, Ronnie Corbett, Cilla Black, The Barron Knights, Morecambe and Wise, Sarah Vaughan, Petula Clark, Johnny Mathis, Engelbert Humperdinck, David Essex, Frankie Laine, Jack Jones, Andy Williams, The Shadows, Les Dawson, Tony Christie, Frankie Vaughan, Ken Dodd, Frankie Howerd, Bernard Manning, Tommy Steele, The Three Degrees and Demis Roussos. Visitors included members of the British royal family, such as The Duke of Edinburgh and Princess Margaret.

Cabaret performances ceased in October 1981.

== World darts championship venue ==
From 1979 to 1985 Jollees hosted the World Professional Darts Championship. In the 1983 Championship, unseeded qualifier Keith Deller beat the top three seeds on the way to winning the tournament in a result often cited as one of the biggest shocks in the history of sport.

== Later years and closure ==
After cabaret performances stopped, the venue continued as a night spot and, in the late 1980s, hosted rave nights, featuring DJs who would later work at Shelley's Laserdome. Financial losses resulted in the venue's closure in 1992.

== 2016 reopening ==
The owners of a Stoke bar purchased the rights to the name and reopened the venue in their bar, with a 300-capacity.
