= Butlins Grand Masters draws =

Butlins Grand Masters

Tournament information
- Venue: Birmingham
- Country: England
- Established: 1977
- Organisation(s): BDO Major (10 editions)
- Format: Legs
- Final Year: 1986

Final champion(s)
- (England) Eric Bristow

The Butlins Grand Masters was a major darts tournament organised by the British Darts Organisation. It was held between 1977 and 1986 and had 16 man draws.

== 1977 ==
Semifinals
(England) John Lowe	5
(Scotland) Rab Smith
(England) Eric Bristow	5
(Wales) Leighton Rees

Final
(England) John Lowe	5
(England) Eric Bristow	4

== 1978 ==
First round
(Australia) Barry Atkinson	4
(England) Ronnie Davis	0
(England) John Lowe	4
(Sweden) Stefan Lord
(Australia) Matt Banovic	4
(England) Charlie Ellix
(Wales) Alan Evans	4
(Republic of Ireland) George Cockwell
(England) Eric Bristow	4
(Scotland) Jeremy Smith
(United States) Nicky Virachkul	4
(England) Doug McCarthy
(Wales) Leighton Rees	4
(New Zealand) Cecil Boyland
(Scotland) Jocky Wilson	4
(United States) Conrad Daniels

Quarterfinals
(Australia) Barry Atkinson
(England) John Lowe	4
(Australia) Matt Banovich
(Wales) Alan Evans	4
(England) Eric Bristow
(United States) Nicky Virachkul	4
(Wales) Leighton Rees	4
(Scotland) Jocky Wilson

Semifinals
(England) John Lowe	5
(Wales) Alan Evans
(United States) Nicky Virachkul
(Wales) Leighton Rees	5

Final
(England) John Lowe	2
(Wales) Leighton Rees	5

== 1979 ==
Quarterfinals
(England) Bill Lennard	4
(Sweden) Stefan Lord
(Scotland) Jocky Wilson	4
(Wales) Leighton Rees
(England) Bobby George	4
(England) Tony Brown
(England) John Lowe	4
(Wales) Ceri Morgan

Semifinals
(England) Bill Lennard	5
(Scotland) Jocky Wilson
(England) Bobby George	5
(England) John Lowe	0

Final
(England) Bill Lennard
(England) Bobby George	5

== 1980 ==
First round
(Scotland) Jocky Wilson	4
(New Zealand) Darryl Watson
(England) John Lowe	4
(New Zealand) Barry Templeton
(England) Cliff Lazarenko	4
(Canada) Alan Hudson
(England) Bobby George	4
(Wales) Alan Evans
(Wales) Leighton Rees	4
(United States) Nicky Virachkul
(United States) Len Heard	4
(England) Tony Brown
(England) Dave Whitcombe	4
(Sweden) Stefan Lord
(England) Bill Lennard	4
(England) Eric Bristow

Quarterfinals
(Scotland) Jocky Wilson
(England) John Lowe	4
(England) Cliff Lazarenko	4
(England) Bobby George
(Wales) Leighton Rees	4
(United States) Len Heard
(England) Dave Whitcombe	4
(England) Bill Lennard

Semifinals
(England) John Lowe
(England) Bobby George	5
(Wales) Leighton Rees	5
(England) Dave Whitcombe

Final
(England) Bobby George	5
(Wales) Leighton Rees

== 1981 ==
First round
(England) Cliff Lazarenko	4
(Northern Ireland) Steve Brennan
(England) Bobby George	4
(England) Bill Lennard
(England) John Lowe	4
(United States) Nicky Virachkul
(Wales) Leighton Rees	4
(England) Dave Whitcombe
(England) Eric Bristow	4
(Sweden) Stefan Lord	4
(Scotland) Jocky Wilson	4
(Singapore) Paul Lim	4

Quarterfinals
(England) Cliff Lazarenko	4
(England) Bobby George
(England) John Lowe	4
(Wales) Leighton Rees
(England) Eric Bristow	4
(Sweden) Stefan Lord
(Scotland) Jocky Wilson	4
(Singapore) Paul Lim

Semifinals
(England) Cliff Lazarenko
(England) John Lowe	5
(England) Eric Bristow	5
(Scotland) Jocky Wilson	0

Final
(England) John Lowe
(England) Eric Bristow	5

== 1982 ==
First round
(United States) Nicky Virachkul	4
(New Zealand) Alan Hill
(England) John Lowe	4
(Canada) Andre Masse
(Scotland) Jocky Wilson	4
(Northern Ireland) Steve Brennan
(England) Cliff Lazarenko	4
(Wales) Leighton Rees	3
(England) Alan Glazier	4
(Sweden) Stefan Lord
(England) Bobby George	4
(Australia) Terry O'Dea
(England) Dave Whitcombe	4
(Singapore) Paul Lim
(England) Eric Bristow	4
(England) Peter Masson

Quarterfinals
(United States) Nicky Virachkul
(England) John Lowe	4
(Scotland) Jocky Wilson	1
(England) Cliff Lazarenko	4
(England) Alan Glazier
(England) Bobby George	4
(England) Dave Whitcombe	0
(England) Eric Bristow	4

Semifinals
(England) John Lowe	2
(England) Cliff Lazarenko	4
(England) Bobby George	4
(England) Eric Bristow

Final
(England) Cliff Lazarenko	3
(England) Eric Bristow	4

== 1983 ==
First round
(Scotland) Jocky Wilson	4
(England) Bobby George
(England) John Lowe	4
(Wales) Ceri Morgan
(England) Dave Whitcombe	4
(England) Keith Deller
(Australia) Terry O'Dea
(Singapore) Paul Lim
(England) Eric Bristow	4
(Sweden) Stefan Lord	3
(England) Tony Brown	4
(England)
(England) Cliff Lazarenko	4
(Australia) Russell Stewart
(Canada) Bob Sinnaeve	4
(United States) Nicky Virachkul

Quarterfinals
(Scotland) Jocky Wilson	4
(England) John Lowe
(England) Dave Whitcombe	4
(Australia) Terry O'Dea or (Singapore) Paul Lim
(England) Eric Bristow	4
(England) Tony Brown	0
(England) Cliff Lazarenko	4
(Canada) Bob Sinnaeve

Semifinals
(Scotland) Jocky Wilson	5
(England) Dave Whitcombe
(England) Eric Bristow	5
(England) Cliff Lazarenko	3

Final
(Scotland) Jocky Wilson	1
(England) Eric Bristow	5

== 1984 ==
First round
(England) Bob Anderson	4
(England) Bobby George	3
(England) Cliff Lazarenko	4
(Scotland) Jocky Wilson	1
(England) Eric Bristow	4
(England) Dave Lee	3
(England) Dave Whitcombe	4
(Australia) Russell Stewart	2
(England) Mike Gregory	4
(United States) Nicky Virachkul	2
(Australia) Terry O'Dea	4
(Canada) Dennis Morgan	1
(Singapore) Paul Lim	4
(Sweden) Stefan Lord	2
(England) John Lowe	4
(Northern Ireland) Steve Brennan	2

Quarterfinals
(England) Bob Anderson	4
(England) Cliff Lazarenko	1
(England) Eric Bristow	4
(England) Dave Whitcombe	1
(England) Mike Gregory	4
(Australia) Terry O'Dea	0
(Singapore) Paul Lim	4
(England) John Lowe	3

Semifinals
(England) Bob Anderson	5
(England) Eric Bristow	1
(England) Mike Gregory	5
(Singapore) Paul Lim	2

Final
(England) Bob Anderson	3
(England) Mike Gregory	5

== 1985 ==
First round
(England) Eric Bristow	4
(Canada) Bill Steinke	2
(England) Mike Gregory	4
(England) Bobby George	3
(England) Cliff Lazarenko	4
(England) Bob Anderson	3
(England) Dave Lee	4
(Northern Ireland) Steve Brennan	0
(England) Terry O'Dea	4
(Wales) Peter Locke	2
(England) Dave Whitcombe	4
(United States) Tony Payne	2
(England) Keith Deller	4
(Scotland) Jocky Wilson	2
(England) John Lowe	4
(England) John Cosnett	2

Quarterfinals
(England) Eric Bristow	4
(England) Mike Gregory	1
(England) Cliff Lazarenko	4
(England) Dave Lee	0
(Australia) Terry O'Dea	4
(England) Dave Whitcombe	2
(England) Keith Deller	2
(England) John Lowe	4

Semifinals
(England) Eric Bristow	5
(England) Cliff Lazarenko	2
(Australia) Terry O'Dea	5
(England) John Lowe	2

Final
(England) Eric Bristow	5
(Australia) Terry O'Dea	3

== 1986 ==
First round
(England) Mike Gregory	4
(Singapore) Paul Lim
(Canada) Bob Sinnaeve	4
(Scotland) Jocky Wilson
(England) Cliff Lazarenko	4
(England) John Lowe
(Northern Ireland) Ray Farrell	4
(United States) Tony Payne
(England) Bob Anderson	4
(England) Dave Whitcombe
(Wales) Peter Locke	4
(Australia) Terry O'Dea
(England) Eric Bristow	4
(Wales) Ceri Morgan
(England) Alan Glazier	4
(England) Keith Deller

Quarterfinals
(England) Mike Gregory
(Canada) Bob Sinnaeve	4
(England) Cliff Lazarenko	4
(Northern Ireland) Ray Farrell
(England) Bob Anderson	4
(Wales) Peter Locke
(England) Eric Bristow	4
(England) Alan Glazier

Semifinals
(Canada) Bob Sinnaeve	5
(England) Cliff Lazarenko
(England) Bob Anderson
(England) Eric Bristow	5

Final
(Canada) Bob Sinnaeve	3
(England) Eric Bristow	5
