= 1981 BDO World Darts Championship =

Tournament information
- Dates: 10–17 January 1981
- Venue: Jollees Cabaret Club
- Location: Stoke-on-Trent
- Country: England
- Organisation(s): BDO
- Format: Sets; Final – best of 9
- Prize fund: £23,300
- Winner's share: £5,500
- High checkout: 170 (England) Tony Brown

Champion(s)
- (England) Eric Bristow

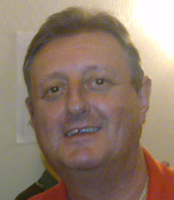
1981 BDO World Darts Champion - Eric Bristow

The 1981 BDO World Darts Championship (known for sponsorship reasons as The 1981 Embassy World Darts Championship) was the fourth British Darts Organisation world championship. The field was expanded from 24 to 32 players, the format which would remain for many years. For the third successive year the tournament was staged at Jollees Cabaret Club in Stoke-on-Trent.

Eric Bristow was back to defend his title and would face John Lowe the champion of two years previously in the final. The final was the best of nine sets, but there was a break scheduled after three sets where the third-fourth place play-off match would be held.

Lowe ran away with the first two sets without dropping a leg and took the first leg in the third set before Bristow finally got onto the scoreboard. The "Crafty Cockney" held on to take that third set to go into the break just one set behind. As in the previous year's final, Bristow edged ahead to lead 4–3 in sets and Lowe (as Bobby George did in 1980) had darts to take the match into a final set. However Lowe missed three attempts at double ten and Bristow took out double four to win the title for the second year running.

== Seeds ==
1. (England) Eric Bristow
2. (England) Tony Brown
3. (England) John Lowe
4. (England) Bobby George
5. (England) Cliff Lazarenko
6. (Wales) Ceri Morgan
7. (Scotland) Jocky Wilson
8. (United States) Nicky Virachkul
9. (Scotland) Rab Smith
10. (Sweden) Stefan Lord
11. (Wales) Leighton Rees
12. (United States) Len Heard
13. (England) Bill Lennard
14. (Canada) Allan Hogg
15. (Belgium) Luc Marreel
16. (England) Dave Whitcombe

== Prize money ==
The prize fund was £22,800.

Champion: £5,500
Runner-Up: £2,500
3rd Place: £600
Semi-Finalists (2): £1,200
Quarter-Finalists (4): £750
Last 16 (8): £500
Last 32 (16): £300

There was also a 9-Dart Checkout prize of £52,000, along with a High Checkout prize of £500.

== Results ==
=== Preliminary round ===
A best of three sets preliminary round match took place between Steve Brennan of Northern Ireland and Wayne Lock of Wales, as they were tied on the rankings.

Player	Score	Player
Wayne Lock (Wales)	2 – 1	(Northern Ireland) Steve Brennan

=== Last 32 ===
First round (best of 3 sets); 10–11 January
1	(England) Eric Bristow 94.89	2
(Australia) Terry O'Dea 82.29	0
16	(England) Dave Whitcombe 88.02	2
(England) Charlie Ellix 72.09	0
8	(United States) Nicky Virachkul 83.34	2
(England) Tony Sontag 84.93	1
9	(Scotland) Rab Smith 86.91	2
Q	(Wales) Wayne Lock 78.75	1
5	(England) Cliff Lazarenko 78.42	2
(Canada) Alan Hudson 57.18	0
12	(United States) Len Heard 65.64	0
(United States) Jerry Umberger 80.52	2
4	(England) Bobby George 86.49	2
(Scotland) Alistair Forrester 75.27	0
13	(England) Bill Lennard 79.92	1
(Wales) Tony Clark 81.57	2
2	(England) Tony Brown 82.47	2
(England) Paul Gosling 79.44	1
15	(Belgium) Luc Marreel 74.58	2
(Denmark) Jan Larsen 65.52	1
7	(Scotland) Jocky Wilson 84.54	2
(New Zealand) Gordon Allpress 76.83	1
10	(Sweden) Stefan Lord 69.51	1
(Australia) Kevin White 67.56	2
6	(Wales) Ceri Morgan 86.79	2
(England) Doug McCarthy 86.01	1
11	(Wales) Leighton Rees 85.35	2
(Australia) Tim Brown 83.13	0
3	(England) John Lowe 93.72	2
(Scotland) Angus Ross 79.11	0
14	(Canada) Allan Hogg 70.59	2
(England) Les Capewell 72.75	0

Second round (best of 3 sets); 12–13 January
1	(England) Eric Bristow 84.96	2
16	(England) Dave Whitcombe 79.23	0
8	(United States) Nicky Virachkul 79.59	2
9	(Scotland) Rab Smith 81.48	0
5	(England) Cliff Lazarenko 95.16	2
(United States) Jerry Umberger 77.82	0
4	(England) Bobby George 80.76	2
(Wales) Tony Clark 75.12	0
2	(England) Tony Brown 79.05	2
15	(Belgium) Luc Marreel 76.68	0
7	(Scotland) Jocky Wilson 79.89	2
(Australia) Kevin White 81.06	1
6	(Wales) Ceri Morgan 79.41	2
11	(Wales) Leighton Rees 76.86	1
3	(England) John Lowe 77.49	2
14	(Canada) Allan Hogg 71.61	1

Quarter-finals (best of 7 sets); 14–15 January
1	(England) Eric Bristow 90.33	4
8	(United States) Nicky Virachkul 79.14	0
5	(England) Cliff Lazarenko 86.70	4
4	(England) Bobby George 81.93	0
2	(England) Tony Brown 78.09	4
7	(Scotland) Jocky Wilson 73.26	2
6	(Wales) Ceri Morgan 80.97	3
3	(England) John Lowe 82.80	4

Semi-finals (best of 7 sets); 16 January
1	(England) Eric Bristow 89.43	4
5	(England) Cliff Lazarenko 83.46	1
2	(England) Tony Brown 88.50	1
3	(England) John Lowe 90.39	4

Final (best of 9 sets); 17 January
1	(England) Eric Bristow 85.95	5
3	(England) John Lowe 81.36	3

Third place match (best of 3 sets) (England) Cliff Lazarenko (5) 75.06 2– 1 Tony Brown (2) 75.42 (England)
