= 1982 BDO World Darts Championship =

Tournament information
- Dates: 9–16 January 1982
- Venue: Jollees Cabaret Club
- Location: Stoke-on-Trent
- Country: England
- Organisation(s): BDO
- Format: Sets; Final – best of 9
- Prize fund: £28,000
- Winner's share: £6,500
- High checkout: 161 (Scotland) Jocky Wilson (England) Bobby George

Champion(s)
- (Scotland) Jocky Wilson

The 1982 BDO World Darts Championship (known for sponsorship reasons as The 1982 Embassy World Darts Championship) was the fifth British Darts Organisation world championship. For the fourth successive year, the tournament was staged at Jollees Cabaret Club in Stoke-on-Trent.

The event saw Scotland's first World Darts Champion, when Jocky Wilson defeated John Lowe in the final. Wilson was making his first final appearance while Lowe was contesting in his fourth final in five years. Wilson would win the match 5-3 and claim the £6,500 first prize.

The tournament's reigning champion Eric Bristow suffered a shock first round exit to Northern Ireland's Steve Brennan, who then defeated Dave Whitcombe to reach the quarter-finals, losing to Stefan Lord.

== Seeds ==
1. (England) Eric Bristow
2. (England) John Lowe
3. (England) Cliff Lazarenko
4. (Scotland) Jocky Wilson
5. (England) Tony Brown
6. (England) Bobby George
7. (Wales) Leighton Rees
8. (Sweden) Stefan Lord

== Prize money ==
The prize fund was £27,400.

Champion: £6,500
Runner-Up: £3,000
3rd Place: £500
Semi-Finalists (2): £1,500
Quarter-Finalists (4): £1,000
Last 16 (8): £600
Last 32 (16): £350

There was also a 9 Dart Checkout prize of £52,000, along with a High Checkout prize of £600.

== The results ==
First round (best of 3 sets); 9–10 January
1	(England) Eric Bristow 74.91	0
(Northern Ireland) Steve Brennan 78.42	2
(England) Dave Whitcombe 83.76	2
(Papua New Guinea) Paul Lim 78.90	0
8	(Sweden) Stefan Lord 81.33	2
(England) Les Capewell 80.04	0
(Scotland) Alistair Forrester 76.59	1
(Belgium) Luc Marreel 74.13	2
5	(England) Tony Brown 81.30	2
(United States) John Kramer 73.86	0
(New Zealand) Gordon Allpress 81.42	1
(United States) Dave Miller 80.85	2
4	(Scotland) Jocky Wilson 90.81	2
(Scotland) Rab Smith 78.78	0
(Wales) Alan Evans 81.63	2
(Canada) Bob Sinnaeve 81.09	1
2	(England) John Lowe 82.11	2
(England) Bill Lennard 70.41	0
(England) Joe Dodd 77.73	2
(Australia) Tim Brown 76.50	1
7	(Wales) Leighton Rees 81.03	0
(Scotland) Angus Ross 81.90	2
(Australia) Terry O'Dea 93.06	2
(Australia) Kevin White 83.25	0
6	(England) Bobby George 80.49	2
(England) Alan Glazier 75.48	1
(United States) Jerry Umberger 69.03	0
(England) Doug McCarthy 69.81	2
3	(England) Cliff Lazarenko 64.29	2
(Denmark) Finn Jensen 56.46	0
(United States) Nicky Virachkul 68.88	2
(Canada) Ray Kippari 66.93	1

Second round (best of 3 sets); 11–12 January
(Northern Ireland) Steve Brennan 91.98	2
(England) Dave Whitcombe 95.49	0
8	(Sweden) Stefan Lord 76.47	2
(Belgium) Luc Marreel 74.58	1
5	(England) Tony Brown 71.13	0
(United States) Dave Miller 77.19	2
4	(Scotland) Jocky Wilson 83.16	2
(Wales) Alan Evans 80.73	1
2	(England) John Lowe 88.20	2
(England) Joe Dodd 81.87	0
(Scotland) Angus Ross 83.64	0
(Australia) Terry O'Dea 81.96	2
6	(England) Bobby George 77.46	2
(England) Doug McCarthy 75.69	1
3	(England) Cliff Lazarenko 78.06	0
(United States) Nicky Virachkul 85.41	2

Quarter-finals (best of 7 sets); 13–14 January
(Northern Ireland) Steve Brennan 80.61	0
8	(Sweden) Stefan Lord 81.42	4
(United States) Dave Miller 78.36	0
4	(Scotland) Jocky Wilson 89.46	4
2	(England) John Lowe 90.81	4
(Australia) Terry O'Dea 84.99	1
6	(England) Bobby George 80.25	4
(United States) Nicky Virachkul 78.57	1

Semi-finals (best of 7 sets); 15 January
8	(Sweden) Stefan Lord 81.66	0
4	(Scotland) Jocky Wilson 89.46	4
2	(England) John Lowe 85.59	4
6	(England) Bobby George 79.11	1

Final (best of 9 sets); 16 January
4	(Scotland) Jocky Wilson 89.79	5
2	(England) John Lowe 84.18	3

== Third-place match ==
- (Sweden) Stefan Lord 76.65 2–1 (England) Bobby George 76.68
