= Houston Open (darts) =

The Houston Open Darts Tournament was an annual darts tournament for steel-point darts in Houston, Texas. The combined prize money is in excess of $10,000. In 2013 the tournament took place on 21-23 June. This year was tournament played for the last time. Due to organizational problems within the hosting body, Harris County Darts Association, the tournament was not held in 2014.

The Houston Open Darts Tournament has been held annually, every year since 1978. The first year, 1978, was held in the ballroom of the Dunfey's Hotel, near Sharpstown Mall in Houston, Texas. Since then, it has been held at several different major hotels.

The Houston Open consists of many events, currently 13, played over three day weekend: Friday through Sunday. Events include singles, doubles, and mixed events for 501 and Cricket. ADO national ranking points are awarded to the winner of the 501 Singles event.

Year	Singles 501 Winner	Score	Runner-up	Total Prize Money	Singles 501 Winner	Singles 501 Runner-Up
1978	(United States) Dan Pucillo	beat	(United States) Frank Ennis	?	?	?
1979	(United States) Nicky Virachkul	beat	(United States) Conrad Daniels	?	?	?
1980	(United States) Paul Lim	beat	(United States) Javier Gopar	?	?	?
1981	(United States) Andy Green	?-?	(United States) Len Heard			
1982	(United States) Jerry Umberger	?-?	(United States) Dave Miller	?	?	?
1983	(United States) Conrad Daniels	?-?	(United States) Rick Ney	?	?	?
1984	(United States) Gerald Verrier	beat	(United States) Jerry Umberger			
1985	(United States) Gerald Verrier	?-?	(Canada) Joe Gorski	?	?	?
1986	(United States) Dave Kelly	beat	(United States) Tony Payne	?	?	?
1987	(United States) Gerald Verrier	beat	(United States) Sean Downs	?	?	?
1988	(United States) Jim Watkins	beat	(Canada) Bob Sinnaeve	?	?	?
1989	(United States) Steve Brown	beat	(United States) Larry Butler	?	?	?
1990	(United States) Gerald Verrier	beat	(Canada) Rick Bisaro	?	?	?
1991	(United States) Gerald Verrier	beat	(United States) Dick McGinnis	?	?	?
1992	(Canada) John Part	beat	(United States) Gerald Verrier			
1993	(United States) Larry Butler	beat	(Canada) Ron Miller			
1994	(United States) Wade McDonald	beat	(United States) Dan Valletto	?	?	?
1995	(United States) Paul Lim	beat	(United States) Davis Snider			
1996	(United States) Dieter Schutsch	beat	(England) Barry Twomlow			
1997	(United States) Dan Lauby	beat	(United States) Ray Carver			
1998	(United States) Bill Davis	beat	(United States) John Kuczynski			
1999	(United States) Scott Wollaston	beat	(United States) George Walls	?	?	?
2000	(United States) Gerald Verrier	beat	(United States) Gary Mawson	?	?	?
2001	(United States) John Kuczynski	beat	(United States) Russ Lopez	?	?	?
2002	(Canada) John Part	beat	(United States) Roger Carter	?	?	?
2003	(Canada) John Part	beat	(United States) Dan Lauby	?	?	?
2004	(Canada) Gerry Convery	beat	(United States) Darin Young	?	?	?
2005	(Canada) John Part	beat	(United States) Darin Young	?	?	?
2006	(United States) Gary Mawson	?-?	(United States) John Kuczynski	?	?	?
2008	(United States) Brian Blake	?-?	(United States) Peter Kigano	$2,240	$600	$300
2009	(United States) Steve Brown	?-?	(United States) Dieter Schutsch	$1,430	$500	$250
2010	(United States) Tom Sawyer	?-?	(United States) Joey Watts	$1,430	$500	$250
2021	(United States) Kevin Luke	6–4	(United States) Jules van Dongen	$1,430	$500	$250
