= 1978 WDF Europe Cup =

Tournament information
- Location: Copenhagen
- Country: Denmark
- Established: 1–3 September 1978
- Organisation(s): WDF
- Format: Legs

Champion(s)
- Singles; John Lowe (men's singles); Pairs; Eric Bristow & John Lowe (men's pairs); Team; Scotland (men's team); Overall; England (men's overall)

The 1978 WDF Europe Cup was the 1st edition of the WDF Europe Cup darts tournament, organised by the World Darts Federation. It was held in Copenhagen, Denmark from 1 to 3 September.

== Entered teams ==
16 countries/associations entered a team in the event.

Nr.	Country	Men's Selection
1	Belgium	Arnold Vandepoele, Valere Quyssens, Willy Delaere, Louis van Iseghem
2	Cyprus	Vasus Demetriades, Andreas Zannettos, J Nauom, G.H. Sokratolis
3	Denmark	Kaj Mortensen, Orla Iversen, John Andersen, Jan Larsen
4	England	Eric Bristow, Cliff Lazarenko, John Lowe, Doug McCarthy
5	France	Jose Perez, Peter Robbins, Phillippe Marchand, Martial Rondel
6	Finland	Kajp Sundsten, Matti Heinonen, Jorma Karumaa, Seppo Jaakola
7	West Germany	Peter Hummel, Jimmy Hughes, Tammo Schendermein, Alfred Gibson
8	Gibraltar	Joe Goldwin, Billy Duo, Johnny Wood, Freddie Duarte
9	Ireland	Charles Byrne, Sean Morris, Jim McQuillan, Seamus O'Brien
10	Jersey	Joseph Bell, Graham Colsell, Geoffrey Pinei, Tony Truscott
11	Malta	George Borg, Felix Buhagiar, Francis Misfud, Grezzju Scicluna
12	Netherlands	Peter Lee, Herman Jongman, Jilles Vermaat, Peter Smith
13	Northern Ireland	Bobby Evans, Norman Gilmore, Jack Nicholl, Dessie Noade
14	Scotland	George Nicoll, Eric MacLean, Jocky Wilson, Rab Smith
15	Sweden	Stefan Lord, Bjørn Enqvist, Nils-Magnus Ericksson, Becke Johansson
16	Wales	John Assiratti, Alan Evans, Tony Ridler, Leighton Rees

== Men's singles ==
1st Round (best of 7 legs)
(England) John Lowe	4
(Northern Ireland) Norman Gilmore	0
(Cyprus) J Nauom	4
(Germany) Jimmy Hughes	2
(Scotland) George Nicoll
Bye
(Sweden) Nils-Magnus Ericksson	4
(Netherlands) Herman Jongman	0
(Belgium) Louis van Iseghem
Bye
(Denmark) Jan Larsen	4
(Finland) Kajp Sundsten	1
(Republic of Ireland) Jim McQuillan	4
(Gibraltar) Freddie Duarte	2
(Wales) John Assiratti
Bye
(England) Doug McCarthy
Bye
(Netherlands) Peter Lee	4
(Germany) Tammo Schendermein	3
(Denmark) Kaj Mortensen	4
(Cyprus) Vasus Demetriades	1
(Republic of Ireland) Charles Byrne
Bye
(Sweden) Stefan Lord	4
(Northern Ireland) Jack Nicholl	3
(Finland) Jorma Karumaa	4
(Belgium) Arnold Vandepoele	3
(Wales) Alan Evans	4
(Gibraltar) Joe Goldwin	0
(Scotland) Eric MacLean	4
(Northern Ireland) Bobby Evans	1
(Scotland) Jocky Wilson	4
(Gibraltar) Billy Duo	3
(Denmark) Orla Iversen	4
(Cyprus) G.H. Sokratolis	0
(Netherlands) Peter Smith	4
(Finland) Seppo Jaakola	2
(Belgium) Valere Quyssens
Bye
(Wales) Leighton Rees	4
(Northern Ireland) Dessie Noade	0
(Sweden) Becke Johansson	4
(Germany) Alfred Gibson	2
(England) Eric Bristow	4
(Gibraltar) Johnny Wood	2
(Republic of Ireland) Sean Morris
Bye
(Wales) Tony Ridler
Bye
(Scotland) Rab Smith
Bye
(England) Cliff Lazarenko
Bye
(Sweden) Bjørn Enqvist	4
(Germany) Peter Hummel	0
(Republic of Ireland) Seamus O'Brien
Bye
(Finland) Matti Heinonen	4
(Cyprus) Andreas Zannettos	2
(Belgium) Willy Delaere
Bye
(Denmark) John Andersen	4
(Netherlands) Jilles Vermaat	3

2nd Round (best of 7 legs)
(England) John Lowe	4
(Cyprus) J Nauom	0
(Scotland) George Nicoll	4
(Sweden) Nils-Magnus Ericksson	1
(Belgium) Louis van Iseghem	4
(Denmark) Jan Larsen	2
(Republic of Ireland) Jim McQuillan	4
(Wales) John Assiratti	2
(England) Doug McCarthy	4
(Netherlands) Peter Lee	0
(Denmark) Kaj Mortensen	4
(Republic of Ireland) Charles Byrne	3
(Sweden) Stefan Lord	4
(Finland) Jorma Karumaa	1
(Wales) Alan Evans	4
(Scotland) Eric MacLean	3
(Scotland) Jocky Wilson	4
(Denmark) Orla Iversen	0
(Netherlands) Peter Smith	4
(Belgium) Valere Quyssens	1
(Wales) Leighton Rees	4
(Sweden) Becke Johansson	3
(England) Eric Bristow	4
(Republic of Ireland) Sean Morris	0
(Wales) Tony Ridler	4
(Scotland) Rab Smith	3
(England) Cliff Lazarenko	4
(Sweden) Bjørn Enqvist	2
(Republic of Ireland) Seamus O'Brien	4
(Finland) Matti Heinonen	2
(Belgium) Willy Delaere	4
(Denmark) John Andersen	2

3rd Round (best of 7 legs)
(England) John Lowe	4
(Scotland) George Nicoll	1
(Belgium) Louis van Iseghem	4
(Republic of Ireland) Jim McQuillan	3
(England) Doug McCarthy	4
(Denmark) Kaj Mortensen	0
(Sweden) Stefan Lord	4
(Wales) Alan Evans	1
(Scotland) Jocky Wilson	4
(Netherlands) Peter Smith	0
(Wales) Leighton Rees	4
(England) Eric Bristow	2
(Wales) Tony Ridler	4
(England) Cliff Lazarenko	2
(Republic of Ireland) Seamus O'Brien	4
(Belgium) Willy Delaere	1

Quarter-finals (best of 7 legs)
(England) John Lowe	4
(Belgium) Louis van Iseghem	0
(England) Doug McCarthy	4
(Sweden) Stefan Lord	0
(Scotland) Jocky Wilson	4
(Wales) Leighton Rees	2
(Wales) Tony Ridler	4
(Republic of Ireland) Seamus O'Brien	0

Semi-finals (best of 7 legs)
(England) John Lowe	4
(England) Doug McCarthy	0
(Scotland) Jocky Wilson	4
(Wales) Tony Ridler	2

Final (best of 7 legs)
(England) John Lowe	4
(Scotland) Jocky Wilson	1

== Men's Pairs ==
Players in bold denote match winners.

**1st Round** (best of 7)
(Denmark) John Andersen (Denmark) Orla Iversen	0
(Belgium) **Valere Quyssens** **(Belgium) Louis van Iseghem**	**4**
(Sweden) **Nils-Magnus Ericksson** **(Sweden) Bjørn Enqvist**	**4**
(Northern Ireland) Norman Gilmore (Northern Ireland) Dessie Noade	0
(Finland) **Matti Heinonen** **(Finland) Seppo Jaakola**	**4**
(Netherlands) Jilles Vermaat (Netherlands) Peter Smith	3
(England) **Eric Bristow** **(England) John Lowe**	**4**
(Gibraltar) Freddie Duarte (Gibraltar) Johnny Wood	1
(Cyprus) Vasus Demetriades (Cyprus) G.H. Sokratolis	2
(Germany) **Peter Hummel** **(Germany) Alfred Gibson**	**4**
(Republic of Ireland) **Sean Morris** **(Republic of Ireland) Charles Byrne**	**4**
(Northern Ireland) Bobby Evans (Northern Ireland) Jack Nicholl	3
(Scotland) **George Nicoll** **(Scotland) Rab Smith**
Bye
(Wales) **Alan Evans** **(Wales) Leighton Rees**
Bye
(Denmark) **Jan Larsen** **(Denmark) Kaj Mortensen**	**4**
(Finland) Jorma Karumaa (Finland) Kajp Sundsten	0
(Wales) **Tony Ridler** **(Wales) John Assiratti**
Bye
(Netherlands) **Herman Jongman** **(Netherlands) Peter Lee**	**4**
(Germany) Tammo Schendermein (Germany) Jimmy Hughes	3
(England) **Doug McCarthy** **(England) Cliff Lazarenko**
Bye
(Belgium) **Willy Delaere** **(Belgium) Arnold Vandepoele**	**4**
(Cyprus) J Nauom (Cyprus) Andreas Zannettos	0
(Sweden) **Becke Johansson** **(Sweden) Stefan Lord**
Bye
(Republic of Ireland) **Seamus O'Brien** **(Republic of Ireland) Jim McQuillan**	**4**
(Gibraltar) Billy Duo (Gibraltar) Joe Goldwin	3
(Scotland) **Eric MacLean** **(Scotland) Jocky Wilson**
Bye

**2nd Round** (best of 7)
(Belgium) Valere Quyssens (Belgium) Louis van Iseghem	2
(Sweden) **Nils-Magnus Ericksson** **(Sweden) Bjørn Enqvist**	**4**
(Finland) Matti Heinonen (Finland) Seppo Jaakola	2
(England) **Eric Bristow** **(England) John Lowe**	**4**
(Germany) Peter Hummel (Germany) Alfred Gibson	1
(Republic of Ireland) **Sean Morris** **(Republic of Ireland) Charles Byrne**	**4**
(Scotland) George Nicoll (Scotland) Rab Smith	2
(Wales) **Alan Evans** **(Wales) Leighton Rees**	**4**
(Denmark) **Jan Larsen** **(Denmark) Kaj Mortensen**	**4**
(Wales) Tony Ridler (Wales) John Assiratti	3
(Netherlands) Herman Jongman (Netherlands) Peter Lee	1
(England) **Doug McCarthy** **(England) Cliff Lazarenko**	**4**
(Belgium) **Willy Delaere** **(Belgium) Arnold Vandepoele**	**4**
(Sweden) Becke Johansson (Sweden) Stefan Lord	1
(Republic of Ireland) **Seamus O'Brien** **(Republic of Ireland) Jim McQuillan**	**4**
(Scotland) Eric MacLean (Scotland) Jocky Wilson	3

**Quarter-finals** (best of 7)
(Sweden) Nils-Magnus Ericksson (Sweden) Bjørn Enqvist	1
(England) **Eric Bristow** **(England) John Lowe**	**4**
(Republic of Ireland) Sean Morris (Republic of Ireland) Charles Byrne	1
(Wales) **Alan Evans** **(Wales) Leighton Rees**	**4**
(Denmark) Jan Larsen (Denmark) Kaj Mortensen	0
(England) **Doug McCarthy** **(England) Cliff Lazarenko**	**4**
(Belgium) **Willy Delaere** **(Belgium) Arnold Vandepoele**	**4**
(Republic of Ireland) Seamus O'Brien (Republic of Ireland) Jim McQuillan	2

**Semi-finals** (best of 7)
(England) **Eric Bristow** **(England) John Lowe**	**4**
(Wales) Alan Evans (Wales) Leighton Rees	3
(England) **Doug McCarthy** **(England) Cliff Lazarenko**	**4**
(Belgium) Willy Delaere (Belgium) Arnold Vandepoele	3

**Final** (best of 7)
(England) **Eric Bristow** **(England) John Lowe**	**4**
(England) Doug McCarthy (England) Cliff Lazarenko	0

== Men's team ==
Last 16 (best of 17 legs)
Wales
Bye
Cyprus	4
Denmark	9
(Republic of Ireland) Ireland	9
Northern Ireland	8
Netherlands	4
Germany	9
Scotland	9
Finland	3
Sweden
Bye
England
Bye
Belgium	9
Gibraltar	8

Quarter-finals (best of 17 legs)
Wales	9
Denmark	3
(Republic of Ireland) Ireland	9
Germany	1
Scotland	9
Sweden	4
England	9
Belgium	6

Semi-finals (best of 17 legs)
Wales	9
(Republic of Ireland) Ireland	5
Scotland	9
England	8

Final (best of 17 legs)
Wales	3
Scotland	9
