= MFI World Matchplay draws =

MFI World Matchplay

Tournament information
- Venue: Fulcrum Centre, Slough (1984-85), Festival Hall, Basildon (1986-88)
- Country: England
- Established: 1984
- Organisation(s): BDO Major (5 editions)
- Format: Sets
- Final Year: 1988

Final champion(s)
- (England) Eric Bristow

The MFI World Matchplay championship was a major darts tournament organised by the British Darts Organisation. It was held between 1984 and 1988 and had 16 man draws.

== 1984 ==
First round
(England) John Lowe	2
(United States) Nicky Virachkul	1
(England) Keith Deller	2
(Wales) Peter Locke	1
(England) Bob Anderson	2
(Scotland) Jocky Wilson	0
(England) Dave Lee	2
(Sweden) Stefan Lord	0
(Australia) Russell Stewart	2
(England) Mike Gregory	1
(England) Dave Whitcombe	2
(Northern Ireland) Steve Brennan	0
(Australia) Terry O'Dea	2
(England) Eric Bristow	1
(England) Cliff Lazarenko	2
(England) Bobby George	0

Quarterfinals
(England) John Lowe	3
(England) Keith Deller	1
(England) Bob Anderson	3
(England) Dave Lee	1
(Australia) Russell Stewart	0
(England) Dave Whitcombe	3
(Australia) Terry O'Dea	2
(England) Cliff Lazarenko	3

Semifinals
(England) John Lowe	4
(England) Bob Anderson	0
(England) Dave Whitcombe	1
(England) Cliff Lazarenko	4

Final
(England) John Lowe	5
(England) Cliff Lazarenko	3

== 1985 ==
First round
(England) Dave Lee	2
(England) Bobby George	0
(Wales) Peter Locke	2
(England) John Lowe	0
(United States) Nicky Virachkul	2
(Singapore) Paul Lim	0
(England) Bob Anderson	2
(England) Dave Whitcombe	0
(Australia) Terry O'Dea	2
(Northern Ireland) Fred McMullan	1
(England) Cliff Lazarenko	2
(Scotland) Jocky Wilson	1
(England) Mike Gregory	2
(Northern Ireland) Steve Brennan	1
(England) Eric Bristow	2
(England) Keith Deller	1

Quarterfinals
(England) Dave Lee	2
(Wales) Peter Locke	3
(United States) Nicky Virachkul	0
(England) Bob Anderson	3
(Australia) Terry O'Dea	2
(England) Cliff Lazarenko	3
(England) Mike Gregory	1
(England) Eric Bristow	3

Semifinals
(Wales) Peter Locke	0
(England) Bob Anderson	4
(England) Cliff Lazarenko	2
(England) Eric Bristow	4

Final
(England) Bob Anderson	4
(England) Eric Bristow	5

== 1986 ==
First round
(United States) Tony Payne	2
(England) Dave Whitcombe	1
(Australia) Russell Stewart	2
(England) Keith Deller	0
(England) Mike Gregory	2
(England) John Lowe	1
(England) Cliff Lazarenko	2
(Wales) Peter Locke	0
(Singapore) Paul Lim	2
(England) Bob Anderson	0
(Australia) Terry O'Dea	2
(Northern Ireland) Ray Farrell	1
(Northern Ireland) Steve Brennan	2
(England) Eric Bristow	1
(Scotland) Jocky Wilson	2
(England) Dave Lee	1

Quarterfinals
(United States) Tony Payne	0
(Australia) Russell Stewart	3
(England) Mike Gregory	3
(England) Cliff Lazarenko	2
(Singapore) Paul Lim	1
(Australia) Terry O'Dea	3
(Northern Ireland) Steve Brennan	0
(Scotland) Jocky Wilson	3

Semifinals
(Australia) Russell Stewart	3
(England) Mike Gregory	4
(Australia) Terry O'Dea	1
(Scotland) Jocky Wilson	4

Final
(England) Mike Gregory	5
(Scotland) Jocky Wilson	1

== 1987 ==
First round
(England) John Lowe	2
(Singapore) Paul Lim	0
(England) Ritchie Gardner	2
(Sweden) Lars Erik Karlsson	1
(England) Eric Bristow	2
(Canada) Bob Sinnaeve	1
(England) Keith Deller	2
(Finland) Tapani Uitos	0
(England) Mike Gregory	2
(Wales) Alan Evans	0
(Scotland) Jocky Wilson	2
(England) Dave Whitcombe	0
(England) Bob Anderson	2
(United States) Tony Payne	0
(England) Cliff Lazarenko	2
(Wales) Chris Johns	0

Quarterfinals
(England) John Lowe	3
(England) Ritchie Gardner	0
(England) Eric Bristow	2
(England) Keith Deller	3
(England) Mike Gregory	3
(Scotland) Jocky Wilson	1
(England) Bob Anderson	3
(England) Cliff Lazarenko	1

Semifinals
(England) John Lowe	4
(England) Keith Deller	0
(England) Mike Gregory	0
(England) Bob Anderson	4

Final
(England) John Lowe	1
(England) Bob Anderson	5

== 1988 ==
First round
(Scotland) Jocky Wilson	2
(United States) Rick Ney	1
(England) Peter Evison	2
(England) Bob Anderson	0
(England) Mike Gregory	2
(England) Cliff Lazarenko	0
(Canada) Bob Sinnaeve	2
(England) Dave Whitcombe	1
(England) John Lowe	2
(Singapore) Paul Lim	1
(Australia) Russell Stewart	2
(Sweden) Lars Erik Karlsson	0
(Wales) Chris Johns	2
(England) Keith Deller	1
(England) Eric Bristow	2
(England) Paul Reynolds	1

Quarterfinals
(Scotland) Jocky Wilson	0
(England) Peter Evison	3
(England) Mike Gregory	0
(Canada) Bob Sinnaeve	3
(England) John Lowe	2
(Australia) Russell Stewart	3
(Wales) Chris Johns	0
(England) Eric Bristow	3

Semifinals
(England) Peter Evison	1
(Canada) Bob Sinnaeve	4
(Australia) Russell Stewart	0
(England) Eric Bristow	4

Final
(Canada) Bob Sinnaeve	1
(England) Eric Bristow	5
