= WDF Americas Cup =

Tournament information
- Location: Various
- Country: Various
- Established: 2002
- Organisation(s): WDF
- Format: Legs

Current champion(s)
- United States (overall) (The Bahamas) Robin Albury (men's); Sandy Hudson (women's) (Canada) Donovan Pilon (boys) (Canada) Hayley Crowley (girls)

The WDF Americas Cup is a darts tournament held biennially since 2002. The tournament consists of a singles championship. All events have a men's and women's competitions. In 2010-2014 a youth tournament was played. Since 2016 there is individual competitions for boys and girls.

== Men's medalists ==
Year	Location	Medals			Details
Year	Location	Gold	Silver	Bronze	Details
2002	(Cayman Islands) Cayman	(Canada) John Part	(The Bahamas) Wayne Copeland	(Jamaica) Tenge Brown (United States) Timothy Grossman	
2004	(United States) Fort Lauderdale	(United States) John Kuczynski	(Trinidad and Tobago) Vivekanand Dyal	(Jamaica) Tenge Brown (2) (Jamaica) Dwight Smith	
2006	(Barbados) Bridgetown	(United States) Scott Wollaston	(Barbados) Winston Cadogan	(United States) John Kuczynski (Canada) Dave Switzer	
2008	(Trinidad and Tobago) Port of Spain	(United States) Gary Mawson	(Canada) Jerry Hull	(The Bahamas) Harry Brown (Guyana) Sudesh Fitzgerald	
2010	(The Bahamas) Abaco	(United States) Chuck Pankow	(United States) Gary Mawson	(Trinidad and Tobago) Rahaman Hassanali (Trinidad and Tobago) Kevin Jacob	
2012	Belize	(Canada) Troy Hanlon	(Canada) Chris Steiger	(The Bahamas) Robin Albury (United States) Joe Huffman	
2014	(United States) Tampa	(Canada) David Cameron	(Cayman Islands) Romwell Tagalog	(United States) Tom Sawyer (Canada) Ross Snook	
2016	(Barbados) Saint Philip	(Canada) John Norman	(The Bahamas) Robin Albury	(The Bahamas) Zeke Lewis (Barbados) Clyde Murrell	
2018	(Trinidad and Tobago) Claxton Bay	(The Bahamas) Robin Albury	(Barbados) Anthony Forde	(The Bahamas) Shane Sawyer (United States) Tom Sawyer (2)	
2024	(Jamaica) Kingston	(United States) Jason Brandon	(The Bahamas) Shane Sawyer	(Barbados) Anthony Forde (The Bahamas) Rashad Sweeting	

== Women's medalists ==
Year	Location	Medals			Details
Year	Location	Gold	Silver	Bronze	Details
2002	(Cayman Islands) Cayman	(United States) Stacy Bromberg	(United States) Jeniffer Daggy	(Canada) Amy Earle (The Bahamas) Trudy Johnson	
2004	(United States) Fort Lauderdale	(Trinidad and Tobago) Nanette Brooks	(Bermuda) Brenda Hutton	(Barbados) Michelle Stephens (Cayman Islands) Michelle Terry	
2006	(Barbados) Bridgetown	(United States) Stacy Bromberg (2)	(Barbados) Michelle Stephens	(Trinidad and Tobago) Nanette Brooks (Canada) Bonnie Lapierre	
2008	(Trinidad and Tobago) Port of Spain	(Canada) Kim Whaley-Hilts	(Barbados) Maureen Shepherd	(Canada) Brenda Moreau (Barbados) Shelley Taylor	
2010	(The Bahamas) Abaco	(United States) Marilyn Popp	(Canada) Jenelle Legge	(Canada) Nathalie Bolduc (United States) Brenda Roush	
2012	Belize	(United States) Marilyn Popp (2)	(United States) Brenda Roush	(United States) Robin Curry (Canada) Cindy Hayhurst	
2014	(United States) Tampa	(Canada) Joanne Luke	(Cayman Islands) Cindy Veith	(United States) Brenda Roush (2) (United States) Sandy Hudson	
2016	(Barbados) Saint Philip	(Canada) Maria Carli	(Barbados) Eloise Martin	(The Bahamas) Sandra Ferguson (United States) Sandy Hudson (2)	
2018	(Trinidad and Tobago) Claxton Bay	(United States) Sandy Hudson	(Canada) Maria Carli	(United States) Lisa Ayers (Canada) Danna Foster	
2024	(Jamaica) Kingston	(Canada) Maria Carli	(United States) Paula Murphy	(Canada) Danna Foster (Barbados) Eloise Martin	

== Youth's medalists ==
Year	Location	Medals			Details
Year	Location	Gold	Silver	Bronze	Details
2010	(The Bahamas) Abaco	(Canada) Shaun Narain	(Cayman Islands) Arek Archibald	(The Bahamas) Laseton Glinton	
2012	Belize	(Canada) Dawson Murschell	(Canada) Robin Barnes	(The Bahamas) Breydon Rosson	
2014	(United States) Tampa	(Canada) Jaret Dion	(The Bahamas) Breydon Rosson	(Canada) Taylor Probert	

== Boys' medalists ==
Year	Location	Medals			Details
Year	Location	Gold	Silver	Bronze	Details
2016	(Barbados) Saint Philip	(Canada) Saul Arndt	(United States) Tyler Burnett	(Cayman Islands) Adrian Anglin	
2018	(Trinidad and Tobago) Claxton Bay	(Canada) Donovan Pilon	(Cayman Islands) Adrian Anglin	(The Bahamas) Nathan Eldon	
2022	(Jamaica) Kingston				

== Girls' medalists ==
Year	Location	Medals			Details
Year	Location	Gold	Silver	Bronze	Details
2016	(Barbados) Saint Philip	(Canada) Taylor Probert	(United States) Kerena Reese	(The Bahamas) India Sweeting	
2018	(Trinidad and Tobago) Claxton Bay	(Canada) Hayley Crowley	(The Bahamas) Kiana Hicks	(Trinidad and Tobago) Sonia Gupta	
2022	(Jamaica) Kingston				
