= French Open (darts) =

Tournament information
- Venue: Salle Dany Boon
- Location: Bray-Dunes
- Country: France
- Established: 1977
- Organisation(s): WDF
- Format: Legs
- Prize fund: €8,890

Current champion(s)
- Nick Kenny (men's); Deta Hedman (women's); Danny Jansen (youth's)

The French Open is a darts tournament of British Darts Organisation category B and World Darts Federation category 2. It has been held annually since 1977.

== List of winners ==
=== Men's ===
Year	Champion	Av.	Score	Runner-Up	Av.	Prize Money			Venue
Year	Champion	Av.	Score	Runner-Up	Av.	Total	Ch.	R.-Up	Venue
1978	(Belgium) Luc Marreel	n/a	beat	(Belgium) Andre Declerq	n/a	n/a	n/a	n/a	Chatou
1979	(Sweden) Stefan Lord	n/a	beat	(England) Doug McCarthy	n/a	n/a	n/a	n/a	Chatou
1980	(Belgium) Luc Marreel (2)	n/a	beat	(Sweden) Stefan Lord	n/a	n/a	n/a	n/a	Chatou
1981	(Sweden) Stefan Lord (2)	n/a	beat	(Denmark) Jan Larsen	n/a	n/a	n/a	n/a	Chatou
1982	(Denmark) Finn Jensen	n/a	beat	(Denmark) Jan Larsen	n/a	n/a	n/a	n/a	Chatou
1983	(England) Gerry Haywood	n/a	beat	(Scotland) Danny Inglis	n/a	n/a	n/a	n/a	Chatou
1984	(Finland) Tapani Uitos	n/a	beat	(England) Eric Bristow	n/a	n/a	n/a	n/a	Chatou
1985	(Sweden) Stefan Lord (3)	n/a	beat	(United States) Tony Payne	n/a	n/a	n/a	n/a	Chatou
1986	(England) John Lowe	n/a	beat	(Belgium) Willy Logie	n/a	n/a	n/a	n/a	Chatou
1987	(France) Jean-Luc Leclercq	n/a	beat	(Netherlands) Raymond van Barneveld	n/a	n/a	n/a	n/a	Gretz-Armainvilliers
1988	(France) Jean-Luc Leclercq (2)	n/a	beat	(England) Paul Reynolds	n/a	n/a	n/a	n/a	Gretz-Armainvilliers
1989	(England) Dave Askew	n/a	beat	(France) Jean-Luc Leclercq	n/a	n/a	n/a	n/a	Gretz-Armainvilliers
1990	(Belgium) Stefan Eeckelaert	n/a	beat	(Belgium) Marc De Vuyst	n/a	n/a	n/a	n/a	Gretz-Armainvilliers
1991	(England) Rod Harrington	n/a	beat	(United States) Steve Brown	n/a	n/a	n/a	n/a	Gretz-Armainvilliers
1992	(Belgium) Leo Laurens	n/a	beat	(England) Rod Harrington	n/a	n/a	n/a	n/a	Verdun
1993	(England) Rod Harrington (2)	n/a	beat	(England) William Burksfield	n/a	n/a	n/a	n/a	Pleurtuit
1994	(India) Vijay Kumar	n/a	beat	(England) William Burksfield	n/a	n/a	n/a	n/a	Pleurtuit
1995	(Belgium) Pascal Rabau	n/a	beat	(England) Steve Beaton	n/a	n/a	n/a	n/a	Dunkerque
1996	(England) Mervyn King	n/a	beat	(Belgium) Leo Laurens	n/a	n/a	n/a	n/a	Dunkerque
1997	(England) Peter Evison	n/a	5 – 3	(England) Peter Manley	n/a	n/a	n/a	n/a	Strasbourg
1998	(England) Peter Manley	n/a	beat	(Belgium) Pascal Rabau	n/a	n/a	n/a	n/a	Pontoise
1999	(England) Peter Evison (2)	n/a	beat	(France) Glenn Brooksbank	n/a	n/a	n/a	n/a	Carentan
2000	(Belgium) Olivier Spreutels	n/a	5 – 3	(Belgium) Tanguy Borra	n/a	n/a	n/a	n/a	Parc des Expostions, Épinal
2001	(Belgium) Chris van den Bergh	n/a	5 – 2	(Belgium) Rocco Maes	n/a	n/a	n/a	n/a	Parc des Expostions, Épinal
2002	(England) Martin Adams	n/a	beat	(Austria) Mensur Suljović	n/a	n/a	n/a	n/a	Parc des Expostions, Épinal
2003	(Australia) Tony David	n/a	5 – 4	(United States) Bill Davis	n/a	€5,000	€2,000	€500	Parc des Expostions, Épinal
2004	(England) Mark Thomson	n/a	5 – 3	(England) Mark Landers	n/a	€5,000	€2,000	€500	Parc des Expostions, Épinal
2005	(France) Dominique Leroy	n/a	5 – 2	(England) Steve West	n/a	€5,000	€2,000	€500	Parc des Expostions, Épinal
2006	(Netherlands) Ron Meulenkamp	n/a	5 – 4	(Netherlands) Jordy Terburg	n/a	€5,000	€2,000	€500	Parc des Expostions, Épinal
2007	(Netherlands) Dennis te Kloese	n/a	5 – 2	(Netherlands) Mark Wensink	n/a	€3,120	€1,500	€700	Parc des Expostions, Épinal
2008	(Netherlands) Mareno Michels	n/a	5 – 4	(Wales) Robert Hughes	n/a	€3,120	€1,500	€700	Gérardmer
2009	(Philippines) Ronald L. Briones	n/a	5 – 3	(Netherlands) Jean-Pierre Leeuwerik	n/a	€3,120	€1,500	€700	Gérardmer
2010	(England) Alan Norris	n/a	5 – 3	(Belgium) Kim Huybrechts	n/a	€3,120	€1,500	€700	Gérardmer
2011	(England) Alan Norris (2)	n/a	5 – 3	(England) Garry Thompson	n/a	€4,260	€1,700	€800	Gérardmer
2012	(Netherlands) Wesley Harms	n/a	5 – 2	(Germany) Max Hopp	n/a	€3,990	€1,850	€740	Gérardmer
2013	(England) Scott Mitchell	n/a	5 – 4	(England) Tony O'Shea	n/a	€4,370	€1,850	€800	Salle Dany Boon, Bray-Dunes
2014	(Netherlands) Remco van Eijden	n/a	5 – 3	(England) Sam Head	n/a	€5,450	€1,850	€800	Salle Dany Boon, Bray-Dunes
2015	(Wales) Dean Reynolds	n/a	5 – 4	(Netherlands) Ryan de Vreede	n/a	€6,580	€2,000	€1,000	Salle Dany Boon, Bray-Dunes
2016	(Belgium) Geert de Vos	n/a	5 – 2	(England) Mick Baker	n/a	€7,080	€2,000	€1,000	Salle Dany Boon, Bray-Dunes
2017	(Wales) Jim Williams	n/a	5 – 4	(England) Daniel Day	n/a	€7,080	€2,000	€1,000	Salle Dany Boon, Bray-Dunes
2019	(Wales) Nick Kenny	n/a	5 – 1	(England) Nick Fullwell	n/a	€6,000	€2,000	€800	Salle Dany Boon, Bray-Dunes

=== Women's ===
Year	Champion	Av.	Score	Runner-Up	Av.	Prize Money			Venue
Year	Champion	Av.	Score	Runner-Up	Av.	Total	Ch.	R.-Up	Venue
1989	(France) Evelyne Larose	n/a	beat	(France) Corine Aubert	n/a	n/a	n/a	n/a	Gretz-Armainvilliers
1990	(England) Sharon Colclough	n/a	beat	(France) Evelyne Larose	n/a	n/a	n/a	n/a	Gretz-Armainvilliers
1991	(England) Sharon Colclough (2)	n/a	beat	(England) Mandy Solomons	n/a	n/a	n/a	n/a	Gretz-Armainvilliers
1992	(England) Sharon Colclough (3)	n/a	beat	(Denmark) Ann-Louise Peters	n/a	n/a	n/a	n/a	Verdun
1993	(England) Mandy Solomons	n/a	beat	(England) Sharon Colclough	n/a	n/a	n/a	n/a	Pleurtuit
1994	(England) Deta Hedman	n/a	beat	(England) Mandy Solomons	n/a	n/a	n/a	n/a	Pleurtuit
1995	(England) Deta Hedman (2)	n/a	beat	(Netherlands) Francis Hoenselaar	n/a	n/a	n/a	n/a	Dunkerque
1996	(Netherlands) Francis Hoenselaar	n/a	beat	(England) Deta Hedman	n/a	n/a	n/a	n/a	Dunkerque
1997	(Netherlands) Francis Hoenselaar (2)	n/a	beat	(Denmark) Gerda Søgaard-Weltz	n/a	n/a	n/a	n/a	Strasbourg
1998	(Netherlands) Francis Hoenselaar (3)	n/a	beat	(Sweden) Vicky Pruim	n/a	n/a	n/a	n/a	Pontoise
1999	(Belgium) Sandra Pollet	n/a	beat	(England) Tricia Wright	n/a	n/a	n/a	n/a	Carentan
2000	(Sweden) Vicky Pruim	n/a	beat	(Switzerland) Sabine Beutler	n/a	n/a	n/a	n/a	Parc des Expostions, Épinal
2001	(Netherlands) Roelie Bakker	n/a	beat	(Belgium) Sandra Pollet	n/a	n/a	n/a	n/a	Parc des Expostions, Épinal
2002	(Switzerland) Sabine Beutler	n/a	beat	(Germany) Beatrix Krockel	n/a	n/a	n/a	n/a	Parc des Expostions, Épinal
2003	(Wales) Jan Robbins	n/a	beat	(Russia) Anastasia Dobromyslova	n/a	n/a	n/a	n/a	Parc des Expostions, Épinal
2005	(Netherlands) Karin Krappen	n/a	beat	(Belgium) Sandra Pollet	n/a	n/a	n/a	n/a	Parc des Expostions, Épinal
2006	(Netherlands) Francis Hoenselaar (4)	n/a	beat	(Netherlands) Karin Krappen	n/a	n/a	n/a	n/a	Parc des Expostions, Épinal
2007	(Netherlands) Sacci Koelman	n/a	beat	(Netherlands) Thea Kaaijk	n/a	n/a	n/a	n/a	Parc des Expostions, Épinal
2008	(Germany) Irina Armstrong	n/a	4 – 0	(Netherlands) Karin Krappen	n/a	n/a	n/a	n/a	Gérardmer
2009	(France) Carole Frison	n/a	4 – 1	(England) Merryl Dennis	n/a	n/a	n/a	n/a	Gérardmer
2010	(Germany) Irina Armstrong (2)	n/a	4 – 2	(Belgium) Nicole Delie	n/a	n/a	n/a	n/a	Gérardmer
2011	(Germany) Irina Armstrong (3)	n/a	4 – 2	(Luxembourg) Anita Tobias	n/a	n/a	n/a	n/a	Gérardmer
2012	(Germany) Irina Armstrong (4)	n/a	4 – 2	(Netherlands) Aileen de Graaf	n/a	n/a	n/a	n/a	Gérardmer
2013	(Norway) Tamara Schuur	n/a	4 – 2	(England) Rachel Brooks	n/a	n/a	n/a	n/a	Salle Dany Boon, Bray-Dunes
2014	(England) Deta Hedman (3)	n/a	4 – 2	(Germany) Irina Armstrong	n/a	n/a	n/a	n/a	Salle Dany Boon, Bray-Dunes
2015	(England) Fallon Sherrock	n/a	4 – 2	(England) Deta Hedman	n/a	€2,890	€1,200	€550	Salle Dany Boon, Bray-Dunes
2016	(England) Deta Hedman (4)	n/a	4 – 3	(England) Fallon Sherrock	n/a	€2,890	€1,200	€550	Salle Dany Boon, Bray-Dunes
2017	(England) Lisa Ashton	n/a	5 – 4	(England) Deta Hedman	n/a	€2,890	€1,200	€550	Salle Dany Boon, Bray-Dunes
2019	(England) Deta Hedman (5)	n/a	5 – 2	(England) Lisa Ashton	n/a	€2,890	€1,200	€550	Salle Dany Boon, Bray-Dunes

=== Youth's ===
Year	Champion	Av.	Score	Runner-up	Av.	Venue
2012	(Switzerland) Enes Yavuzcan	n/a	beat	(Netherlands) Lars Fransen	n/a	Gérardmer
2013	(England) Andrew Clark	n/a	beat	(Belgium) Wesley van de Voorde	n/a	Salle Dany Boon, Bray-Dunes
2014	(Belgium) Bryan Coenderaerts	n/a	beat	(Belgium) Wesley van de Voorde	n/a	Salle Dany Boon, Bray-Dunes
2015	(Netherlands) Levy Frauenfelder	n/a	beat	(Netherlands) Owen Roelofs	n/a	Salle Dany Boon, Bray-Dunes
2016	(Netherlands) Dylan van Beers	n/a	beat	(Netherlands) Marvin van Velzen	n/a	Salle Dany Boon, Bray-Dunes
2017	(Netherlands) Gijsbert van Malsen	n/a	beat	(Netherlands) Daan Bastiaansen	n/a	Salle Dany Boon, Bray-Dunes
2019	(Netherlands) Danny Jansen	n/a	beat	(Netherlands) Daan Bastiaansen	n/a	Salle Dany Boon, Bray-Dunes

== Tournament records ==
- Most wins 3: (Sweden) Stefan Lord.
- Most Finals 4: (Sweden) Stefan Lord.
- Most Semi Finals 3: (England) Rod Harrington, (Belgium) Leo Laurens.
- Most Quarter Finals 3: (England) Rod Harrington, (Belgium) Leo Laurens, (France) Glenn Brooksbank, (Belgium) Tanguy Borra.
- Most Appearances 5: (Belgium) Tanguy Borra.
- Most Prize Money won €3,800: (England) Alan Norris.
- Best winning average (.) : v's
- Youngest Winner age 17: (Netherlands) Ron Meulenkamp.
- Oldest Winner age 56: (England) Martin Adams.

== See also ==
- List of BDO ranked tournaments
- List of WDF tournaments
