= Peter Locke =

Peter Locke may refer to:

- Peter Locke (darts player) (born 1956), Welsh professional darts player
- Peter Locke (producer), American film producer
