= Angus Ross (darts player) =

Scottish darts player (1953–2016)

Personal information
- Nickname: "The Beef"
- Born: 18 April 1953 Glasgow, Scotland
- Died: 17 January 2016 (aged 62) Kinbrace, Scotland

Sport
- Sport: Darts
- Laterality: Right-handed

Organisation (see split in darts)
- BDO: 1979–1982

WDF major events – best performances
- World Championship: Last 16: 1982
- World Masters: Last 16: 1979

Other tournament wins
- Years
| BDO Golden Darts Ch'ship Pairs | 1980 |
| BDO Nations Cup | 1981 |

Angus Ross (18 April 1953 – 17 January 2016) was a Scottish professional darts player who competed in the 1970s and 1980s.

== Biography ==
Ross represented Scotland with captain Rab Smith and Jocky Wilson in the 1981 BDO Nations Cup. In the final with Scotland and England tied at 4–4, Ross defeated Cliff Lazarenko in the deciding leg to clinch the trophy 5-4 for the Scots.

He competed in the 1981 BDO World Darts Championship, losing in the first round to John Lowe. He then played in the 1982 BDO World Darts Championship and defeated former world champion Leighton Rees 2–0 in the first round, but was defeated by Australian Terry O'Dea 0–2 in the second round.

Ross once appeared on the quiz show Bullseye, where he achieved a score of 179 from nine darts.

Ross died from pancreatic cancer in January 2016 at the age of 62.

== World Championship results ==
=== BDO ===
- 1981: 1st Round (lost to John Lowe 0–2)
- 1982: 2nd Round (lost to Terry O'Dea 0–2)
