= Mands =

Mands is a surname. Notable people with the surname include:

- Margaret Fenwick (1919–1992), born Margaret Mands, Scottish trade unionist
- Willie Mands (fl. 1980s), Scottish darts player

== See also ==
- Mand (disambiguation)
