= Allpress =

Allpress is an English surname. Notable people with the surname include:

- Bruce Allpress (1930–2020), New Zealand actor
- Gordon Allpress (born 1949), New Zealand-born Australian darts player
- Lisa Allpress (born 1974/75), New Zealand jockey
- Tim Allpress (born 1971), English footballer
