= Fred McMullan =

Northern Irish darts player (born 1950)

Personal information
- Born: 4 June 1950 (age 76) Derry, Northern Ireland
- Home town: Bushmills, Northern Ireland

Sport
- Sport: Darts
- Playing since: 1968
- Darts: 31g
- Laterality: Right-handed
- Walk-on music: "Whiskey in the Jar" by Thin Lizzy

Organisation (see split in darts)
- BDO: 1982–1988

WDF major events – best performances
- World Championship: Quarter Finals: 1985
- World Masters: Semi Finals: 1984

Other tournament wins
- Tournament: Years
- Northern Ireland Masters: 1984

Fred McMullan (born 4 June 1950) is a Northern Irish former professional darts player who competed in the 1980s.

== Career ==
McMullan played at the World Darts Championship three times. In 1985, he beat Peter Locke of Wales in the first round and then beat Bobby George to reach the quarter-finals but was defeated by Cliff Lazarenko. In 1985 MFI World Matchplay he lost to Terry O'Dea from Australia. In 1986 he beat Willie Mands in the first round but lost in round two to John Lowe. In the 1986 MFI World Pairs he defeated Keith Deller and Bobby George in the semi-finals with Dave Whitcombe but then lost to Eric Bristow and Peter Locke. He returned in 1988 and defeated Finland's Tapani Uitos in round one but lost in the second round to Peter Evison from England.

McMullan won the 1984 Northern Ireland Masters champions, beating David Keery of Ireland.

Before all this, McMullan reached the semi-finals of the 1984 Winmau World Masters, beating Angel Ruiz, Christer Pilbald, Ellis Elsevijf, Peter Locke, Nicky Skinner Jocky Wilson and Alan Evans before losing to reigning champion Eric Bristow who eventually retained his title.

He retired in 1999 due to health problems.

== World Championship results ==
=== BDO ===
- 1985: Quarter Final: (lost to Cliff Lazarenko 0–4) (sets)
- 1986: Last 16: (lost to John Lowe 1–3)
- 1988: Last 16: (lost to Peter Evison 0–3)
