= Paul Lim =

Singaporean darts player (born 1954)

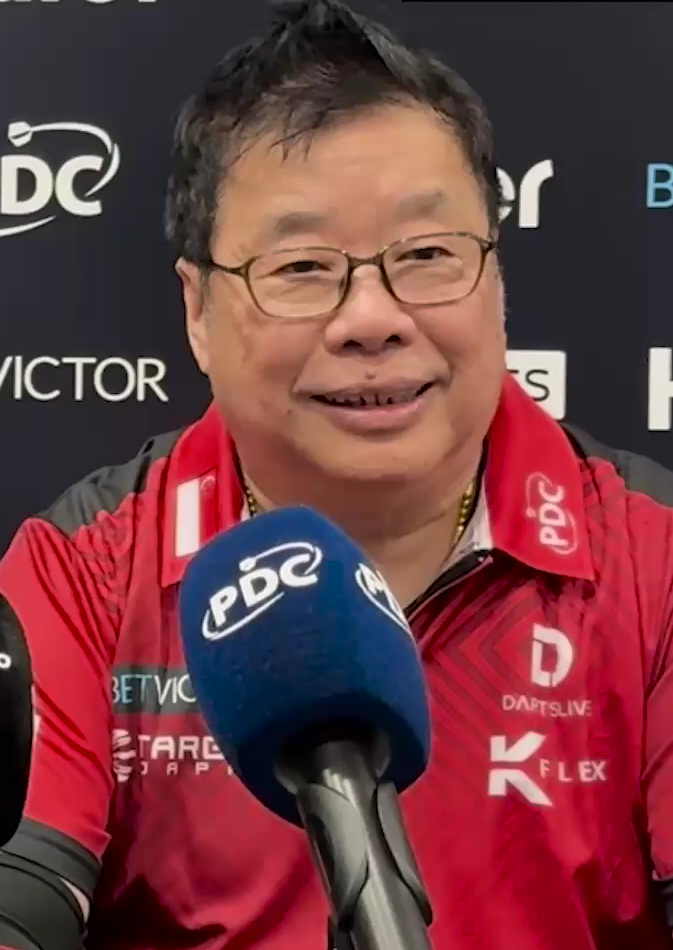
- Lim with Singapore at the 2026 PDC World Cup of Darts

Personal information
- Full name: Paul Lim Leong Hwa 林良華
- Nickname: "The Singapore Slinger"
- Born: 25 January 1954 (age 72) Singapore

Sport
- Sport: Darts
- Playing since: 1973
- Darts: 22g Target Signature
- Laterality: Right-handed
- Walk-on music: "Walk of Life" by Dire Straits

Organisation (see split in darts)
- BDO: 1980–1994
- PDC: 1994–
- WDF: 1980–1994, 2019–

WDF major events – best performances
- World Championship: Runner-up: 2024
- World Masters: Last 16: 1981, 1985, 1987, 1988

PDC premier events – best performances
- World Championship: Last 16: 2001
- World Matchplay: Quarter-final: 1995
- World Grand Prix: Last 16: 1998, 1999
- Desert Classic: Last 32: 2004
- US Open/WSoD: Last 64: 2008, 2010

WSDT major events – best performances
- World Championship: Last 24: 2022
- World Masters: Last 20: 2022

Other tournament wins
- Years
Australian Grand Masters	1983
Bud Brick Memorial	2022
Camellia Classic	1994
Colorado Open	2005
Darts America	1986, 1990
Golden Gate Classic	1987
Hong Kong Open	1989, 1992, 1998, 2000, 2001
Houston Open	1980, 1987, 1995
Japan Open	2022
Los Angeles Open	1987, 1993
Malaysian Open	1980
Oregon Open	1999
Philippines Open	2018
Singapore Open	1992, 1993
Virginia Beach Classic	1992, 1998
Bullshooter World Championship	1996
Dartslive France	2017
Dartslive Hong Kong	2012
Dartslive Korea	2016
Dartslive Taipei	2016
THE WORLD	2011
Ulaanbaatar Open	2023, 2024
Mongolian Open	2025
PDC Asian Tour (x6)
2018, 2019 (x2), 2023, 2025 (x2)

Other achievements
- First player to achieve nine-dart finish at World Championships (1990)
Medal record
Men's Darts
Representing Papua New Guinea
WDF Asia-Pacific Cup
Gold medal – first place	1980 Newcastle	Men's singles
Gold medal – first place	1980 Newcastle	Team event
Gold medal – first place	1984 Honolulu	Men's singles
Gold medal – first place	1986 Auckland	Men's singles
Representing United States
WDF Asia-Pacific Cup
Gold medal – first place	1988 Tokyo	Team event
Gold medal – first place	1990 Singapore	Mixed pairs
Gold medal – first place	1990 Singapore	Team event
Gold medal – first place	1990 Singapore	Men's overall
Silver medal – second place	1990 Singapore	Men's singles
Silver medal – second place	1990 Singapore	Men's pairs
Representing Singapore
WDF World Cup
Bronze medal – third place	1987 Copenhagen	Men's singles
Bronze medal – third place	1989 Toronto	Men's pairs
IDF World Ch'ship
Silver medal – second place	2013 Shanghai	Men's singles
Representing Hong Kong
WDF World Cup
Silver medal – second place	2019 Cluj	Men's team
- Updated on 19 November 2007

Paul Lim Leong Hwa (born 25 January 1954) is a Singaporean professional darts player who competes in World Darts Federation (WDF) and Professional Darts Corporation (PDC) events. Nicknamed "the Singapore Slinger", Lim was the first player to hit a nine-dart finish during the BDO World Darts Championship, which he achieved in 1990 during his second-round match against Jack McKenna. He is also the oldest player to have played and won at a PDC World Championship, having played in the 2026 PDC World Darts Championship aged 71, and defeated Jeffrey de Graaf in round one on 13 December 2025.

He was the runner-up at the 2024 WDF Lakeside World Championship.

== Early life ==
Born in Singapore, Lim is the son of a wealthy jade merchant who had several wives, and he has over twenty siblings. He moved to England at the age of 20 after he had completed national service, and attended culinary school. Lim began playing darts in the 1970s at a local pub while he was living in Chiswick. He returned to Singapore at 26 to work as a hotel chef, then moved to Papua New Guinea in 1982 to work at a Travelodge hotel.

== Career ==
While in Papua New Guinea, Lim began to represent them in darts internationally, winning the 1980 World Darts Federation Pacific Cup singles title and defeating American Jerry Umberger. He hit a ten-dart finish during this tournament.

Lim became friends with Umberger, who he had defeated in the Pacific Cup, and Lim moved to San Bernardino, California in 1985 to play on the American darts circuit. He maintained a part-time job as a chef while playing darts on the weekends. Originally representing the United States, Lim began playing for Singapore once they gained WDF status. In 1988, he was the number one darts player in the United States; he had ranked highest in 1987 but as he had not resided in the country long enough he was not eligible to be number one.

Lim made his World Championship debut in 1982, losing a first-round match to Dave Whitcombe. He failed to progress beyond the second round for the next seven years.

In 1990, Lim achieved the first World Championship nine-dart finish against Jack McKenna in the second round on 9 January and won a bonus prize of £52,000. This was the second ever televised nine-dart finish, after John Lowe hit one against Keith Deller in 1984, and the only one ever achieved in the BDO World Championship. It was the only year that Lim reached the quarter-finals of the event, and he lost again to Cliff Lazarenko.

In 1994, Lim decided to switch to the World Darts Council (now PDC) and made his debut at the 1994 World Matchplay. He never enjoyed any success in the PDC – he won only one match in the PDC World Championship, despite appearing in the tournament each year between 1997 and 2002.

Lim reached the last 16 of the Las Vegas Open in January 2007.

Lim made his first appearance in the World Championships for 11 years after being awarded a place in the 2013 PDC World Darts Championship, as a result of being the World Soft Tip Champion. He beat Mohd Latif Sapup in the preliminary round 4–1 to set up a first-round match against Michael van Gerwen. Lim lost 3–0, despite hitting the tournament's first 170 finish as well as twelve scores of 140 or more during the match. Lim qualified for the 2014 World Championship via the International Qualifiers. He was drawn against Japan's Morihiro Hashimoto in the preliminary round and was beaten 4–2.

Lim made his debut in the 2014 World Cup of Darts as he represented Singapore with Harith Lim. They won five legs in a row in the opening round against Ireland to progress with a 5–3 win. In the second round Lim lost to South Africa's Devon Petersen, but Harith beat Graham Filby, resulting in a doubles match to settle the tie. Singapore were edged out 4–3, but never had a dart for the match.

Lim lost in the final of the 2015 French Dartslive event to Leonard Gates, but won the Soft Tip Qualifier for the 2016 World Championship for the second time by seeing off Boris Krčmar 4–2 in the final. He went on to play Aleksandr Oreshkin in the preliminary round and missed two match darts in a 2–1 set defeat. Lim and Harith made it to the second round of the 2016 World Cup, but lost their singles matches 4–2 to Austria's Mensur Suljović and Rowby-John Rodriguez. Lim won the Soft Tip Dartslive events in Taipei and Korea during the year.

In the first round of the 2017 World Cup Lim and Harith met the number one seeds of Scotland represented by Gary Anderson and Peter Wright. A 100 finish from Lim completed a 5–2 shock victory for Singapore and they then beat Spain 4–0 in a doubles match to make it through to the quarter-finals of the event for the first time. Lim lost 4–1 to Belgium's Kim Huybrechts (who averaged 121.97), but Harith defeated Ronny Huybrechts 4–2. Singapore's tournament was ended in the deciding doubles match as Belgium progressed 4–2.

In the 2018 PDC World Darts Championship, Lim defeated Kai Fan Leung, and Mark Webster to set up a second-round clash with Gary Anderson. He lost the match 4-1 and also missed double 12 for a nine-dart finish. In the 2018 PDC World Cup of Darts, he again paired up with Harith, where they defeated New Zealand 5–3 to set up a second-round clash with England. In the first round, Paul defeated world champion Rob Cross 4–2 with an average of 102.29. However, Harith lost his singles match to Dave Chisnall, meaning a doubles match was required which they lost 4–1.

Lim qualified for the 2019 PDC World Darts Championship by finishing fifth on the 2018 PDC Asian Tour. He lost to Ross Smith 3–1 in round one.

After a successful 2019 Asian Tour, finishing third, he qualified for the 2020 PDC World Darts Championship, where he lost to Luke Woodhouse 3–0 in the first round.

Lim took part in the 2019 WDF World Cup representing Hong Kong instead of Singapore.

At the 2024 WDF World Darts Championship, Lim was the oldest player at the tournament. A 150/1 outsider to win, he defied the odds to make the final, ultimately losing to Shane McGuirk 6–3.

In 2025, Lim qualified for 2026 PDC World Darts Championship after finishing fifth on the Asian Tour, marking his return to Alexandra Palace for the first time since 2022 and extending his record as the oldest ever player at a PDC World Championship. After defeating Jeffrey de Graaf in the first round, Lim also became the oldest ever player to win a match at a World Championship.

== In popular culture ==
At 5'7, Lim was considered quite small to be a darts player; a 1980 Daily Mirror article commented on the height difference between him and fellow World Masters finalist Tom Taylor.

Lim was a guest on British television gameshow Bullseye in 1984. He also features as himself in video game Yakuza 6: The Song of Life, where a mission level is to beat him in a game of darts.

== Personal life ==
Lim is married to Janet, who is of English origin, and the couple have two sons; Lim's son Chris is also a darts player. While living in San Bernardino, Lim worked as a chef, predominantly in French and Asian cuisines. Lim is Catholic.

== World Championship results ==
=== BDO World Championship ===
- 1982: First round (lost to Dave Whitcombe 0–2)
- 1983: Second round (lost to Cliff Lazarenko 1–3)
- 1984: First round (lost to Mike Gregory 0–2)
- 1985: First round (lost to Cliff Lazarenko 0–2)
- 1986: Second round (lost to Peter Locke 0–3)
- 1987: Second round (lost to Bob Anderson 1–3)
- 1988: Second round (lost to John Lowe 1–3)
- 1989: Second round (lost to John Lowe 2–3)
- 1990: Quarter-finals (lost to Cliff Lazarenko 0–4)
- 1991: First round (lost to Alan Warriner 0–3)
- 1992: Second round (lost to John Lowe 0–3)
- 1994: Second round (lost to John Part 0–3)

=== PDC World Championship ===
- 1997: Group-stage (lost to John Lowe 1–3 and Jamie Harvey 2–3)
- 1998: Group-stage (lost to Peter Evison 0–3 and John Part 1–3)
- 1999: First round (lost to John Lowe 0–3)
- 2000: First round (lost to Alan Warriner-Little 0–3)
- 2001: Second round (lost to Alan Warriner-Little 2–3)
- 2002: First round (lost to Dennis Smith 0–4)
- 2013: First round (lost to Michael van Gerwen 0–3)
- 2014: Preliminary round (lost to Morihiro Hashimoto 2–4)
- 2016: Preliminary round (lost to Aleksandr Oreshkin 1–2)
- 2018: Second round (lost to Gary Anderson 1–4)
- 2019: First round (lost to Ross Smith 1–3)
- 2020: First round (lost to Luke Woodhouse 0–3)
- 2021: Second round (lost to Dimitri Van den Bergh 0–3)
- 2022: First round (lost to Joe Murnan 2–3)
- 2026: Second round (lost to Luke Humphries 0–3)

=== World Seniors Championship ===
- 2022: First round (lost to Dave Prins 1–3)

=== WDF World Championship ===
- 2024: Runner-up (lost to Shane McGuirk 3–6)

== Career finals ==
=== WDF major finals: 5 (3 titles) ===
Legend
World Championship (0–1)

Outcome	No.	Year	Championship	Opponent in the final	Score (Note: (l) = score in legs, (s) = score in sets.)
Winner	1.	1980	Asia-Pacific Cup Singles	(United States) Jerry Umberger	unknown
Winner	2.	1984	Asia-Pacific Cup Singles	(Australia) Terry O'Dea	unknown
Winner	3.	1986	Asia-Pacific Cup Singles	(United States) Len Heard	unknown
Runner-up	4.	1990	Asia-Pacific Cup Singles	(Canada) Albert Anstey	unknown
Runner-up	5.	2024	WDF World Darts Championship	(Republic of Ireland) Shane McGuirk	3–6 (s)

== Career statistics ==
=== Performance timeline ===
==== BDO ====
Tournament	1980	1981	1982	1983	1984	1985	1986	1987	1988	1989	1990	1991	1992	1993	1994	2002
BDO Ranked televised events
World Championship	DNQ		1R	2R	1R	1R	2R	2R	2R	2R	QF	1R	2R	DNQ	2R	DNP
World Masters	Prel.	3R	3R	2R	1R	4R	2R	4R	4R	3R	DNP			Prel.	DNP	2R
MFI World Matchplay	Not held				DNP	1R	QF	1R	1R	Not held						

==== WDF ====
Tournament	2022	2024
World Championship	DNP	F
World Masters	2R	DNP

==== WSDT ====
Tournament	2022
World Seniors Darts Championship	1R

==== PDC ====
Tournament	1994	1995	1996	1997	1998	1999	2000	2001	2002	2003	2004	2013	2014	2015	2016	2017	2018	2019	2020	2021	2022	2023	2024	2025	2026
PDC Ranked televised events
World Championship	DNP			RR	RR	1R	1R	2R	1R	DNP		1R	Prel.	DNP	Prel.	DNP	2R	1R	1R	2R	1R	DNQ			2R
World Matchplay	2R	QF	2R	2R	1R	1R	DNP	1R	Did not participate/qualify																
World Grand Prix	Not held				1R	RR	Did not participate/qualify																		
PDC Non-ranked televised events
World Cup	Not held											DNP	2R	1R	2R	QF	2R	2R	WD	2R	1R	RR	RR	RR	RR
PDC Past major events
Las Vegas Desert Classic	Not held								DNP		1R	Not held													
Career statistics
Year-end ranking	25	16	12	14	17	20	25	32	38	77	142	92	-	155	-	103	133	138	105	126	-	-	-	115	-

===== World Series of Darts =====
Tournament	2016	2017	2023	2026
Bahrain Darts Masters	NH		1R	1R
Saudi Arabia Darts Masters	NH			1R
Shanghai Darts Masters	1R	1R	NH	

Performance Table Legend
W	Won the tournament	F	Finalist	SF	Semifinalist	QF	Quarterfinalist	#R; RR; Prel.	Lost in # round Round-robin; Preliminary round	DQ	Disqualified
DNQ	Did not qualify	DNP	Did not participate	WD	Withdrew	NH	Tournament not held	#R; RR; Prel.	Lost in # round Round-robin; Preliminary round	NYF	Not yet founded
