= 1995 World Matchplay =

1995 Webster's World Matchplay

Tournament information
- Dates: 31 July–5 August 1995
- Venue: Winter Gardens
- Location: Blackpool
- Country: England
- Organisation(s): PDC
- Format: Legs
- Prize fund: £42,800
- Winner's share: £10,000

Champion(s)
- (England) Phil Taylor

The 1995 Webster's World Matchplay was the second annual World Matchplay darts tournament organised by the World Darts Council (WDC, which became the Professional Darts Corporation in 1997). The Winter Gardens, Blackpool played host to the event for the second year running, and it took place between 31 July–5 August 1995.

Seven former world champions were in the field. Defending champion Larry Butler beat one of them, Eric Bristow, in the first round. Butler's title defence ended with a quarter-final defeat to Dennis Priestley, the man he beat to win the title the previous year.

Jocky Wilson made what turned out to be his last appearance in a televised tournament at this event. The two-time former World Champion beat Rod Harrington in the first round, but then lost to Nigel Justice in the second round.

Phil Taylor and Dennis Priestley continued their rivalry when they met in another major final. This time it was Taylor who came out on top by 16 legs to 11 to claim his first World Matchplay title.

== Prize money ==
The prize fund was £42,400.

Position (no. of players)		Prize money (Total: £42,400)
Winner	(1)	£10,000
Runner-Up	(1)	£6,000
Third place	(1)	£3,250
Fourth place	(1)	£2,750
Quarter-finalists	(4)	£1,500
Second round	(8)	£800
First round	(16)	£500

== Seeds ==
There were eight seeds for the competition.

1. (England) Rod Harrington
2. (England) Phil Taylor
3. (England) Bob Anderson
4. (England) Dennis Priestley
5. (England) Peter Evison
6. (England) Kevin Spiolek
7. (England) Alan Warriner
8. (England) Shayne Burgess

== Results ==
Players in bold denote match winners.

**First round** (best of 15 legs); 31 July–1 August
1	(England) Rod Harrington 77.04	4
(Scotland) **Jocky Wilson** 77.85	**8**
(Belgium) Jef Scheyltjens 84.03	4
(England) **Nigel Justice** 84.72	**8**
8	(England) **Shayne Burgess** 89.97	**8**
(England) John Russell 86.40	5
(England) Dennis Smith 76.56	6
(England) **Cliff Lazarenko** 78.72	**8**
5	(England) **Peter Evison** 90.27	**8**
(England) Graeme Stoddart 84.15	1
(England) Eric Bristow 78.36	5
(United States) **Larry Butler** 91.41	**8**
4	(England) **Dennis Priestley** 86.37	**8**
(England) Mick Manning 81.15	5
(United States) **Steve Brown** 80.01	**8**
(England) Ritchie Gardner 70.62	5
2	(England) **Phil Taylor** 90.24	**8**
(United States) Gary Mawson 81.87	5
(Scotland) **Jamie Harvey** 90.81	**8**
(United States) Jerry Umberger 75.51	3
7	(England) **Alan Warriner** 79.98	**8**
(United States) Gerald Verrier 78.09	4
(United States) **Paul Lim** 80.76	**12**
(England) Kevin Burrows 79.74	10
6	(England) **Kevin Spiolek** 75.09	**10**
(United States) Dave Kelly 71.43	8
(England) Steve Raw 87.39	3
(England) **Keith Deller** 87.54	**8**
3	(England) Bob Anderson 80.37	8
(England) **John Lowe** 86.97	**10**
(United States) Sean Downs 74.91	6
(Republic of Ireland) **Tom Kirby** 79.47	**8**

**Second round** (best of 15 legs); 2 August
(Scotland) Jocky Wilson 74.19	5
(England) **Nigel Justice** 83.46	**8**
8	(England) Shayne Burgess 75.42	5
(England) **Cliff Lazarenko** 79.41	**8**
5	(England) Peter Evison 83.79	5
(United States) **Larry Butler** 85.56	**8**
4	(England) **Dennis Priestley** 93.21	**8**
(United States) Steve Brown 84.45	3
2	(England) **Phil Taylor** 92.70	**8**
(Scotland) Jamie Harvey 90.81	6
7	(England) Alan Warriner 85.62	5
(United States) **Paul Lim** 90.12	**8**
6	(England) Kevin Spiolek 72.30	2
(England) **Keith Deller** 81.48	**8**
(England) **John Lowe** 91.17	**8**
(Republic of Ireland) Tom Kirby 87.96	5

**Quarter-finals** (best of 21 legs); 3 August
(England) Nigel Justice 80.64	6
(England) **Cliff Lazarenko** 82.02	**11**
(United States) Larry Butler 85.26	8
4	(England) **Dennis Priestley** 85.41	**11**
2	(England) **Phil Taylor** 100.38	**11**
(United States) Paul Lim 86.19	4
(England) Keith Deller 82.95	10
(England) **John Lowe** 90.18	**12**

**Semi-finals** (best of 25 legs); 4 August
(England) Cliff Lazarenko 86.28	10
4	(England) **Dennis Priestley** 85.02	**13**
2	(England) **Phil Taylor** 92.88	**13**
(England) John Lowe 84.45	4

**Final** (best of 31 legs); 5 August
4	(England) Dennis Priestley 87.63	11
2	(England) **Phil Taylor** 90.72	**16**
**Third place playoff** (best of 21 legs); 5 August
(England) Cliff Lazarenko	3
(England) **John Lowe**	**11**
