= Butlins Grand Masters =

Tournament information
- Location: Birmingham
- Country: (United Kingdom) Great Britain
- Established: 1977
- Organisation(s): BDO Former Major (10 editions)
- Format: Legs
- Final Year: 1986

Final champion(s)
- (England) Eric Bristow

The Butlins Grand Masters was a former Major darts tournament organised by the British Darts Organisation and televised by ATV/Central between 1977 and 1986. The event was sponsored by the holiday and leisure company Butlins.

== Butlins Grand Masters finals ==
Year	Champion (average in final)	Score	Runner-up (average in final)	Prize money			Sponsor
Year	Champion (average in final)	Score	Runner-up (average in final)	Total	Champion	Runner-up	Sponsor
1977	(England) John Lowe	5–4	(England) Eric Bristow	?	?	?	Butlins
1978	(Wales) Leighton Rees	beat	(England) John Lowe	?	?	?	Butlins
1979	(England) Bobby George	beat	(England) Bill Lennard	?	?	?	Butlins
1980	(England) Bobby George	beat	(Wales) Leighton Rees	?	?	?	Butlins
1981	(England) Eric Bristow	beat	(England) John Lowe	?	?	?	Butlins
1982	(England) Eric Bristow	4–3	(England) Cliff Lazarenko	?	?	?	Butlins
1983	(England) Eric Bristow (95.61)	5–1	(Scotland) Jocky Wilson (99.27)	?	£3,000	?	Butlins
1984	(England) Mike Gregory	5–3	(England) Bob Anderson	£14,100	£4,000	?	Butlins
1985	(England) Eric Bristow	5–3	(Australia) Terry O'Dea	?	?	?	Butlins
1986	(England) Eric Bristow	5–3	(Canada) Bob Sinnaeve	?	?	?	Butlins

== Tournament records ==
- Most wins 5: (England) Eric Bristow.
- Most Finals 6: (England) Eric Bristow.
- Most Semi Finals 7: (England) Eric Bristow.
- Most Quarter Finals 7: (England) Eric Bristow.
- Most Appearances 7: (England) Eric Bristow.
- Best winning average (99.27): (Scotland) Jocky Wilson v's (England) Eric Bristow, Final, 1983.
- Youngest Winner age 24: (England) Eric Bristow.
- Oldest Winner age 38: (Wales) Leighton Rees.

== See also ==
- Butlins Grand Masters draws
