= 1986 BDO World Darts Championship =

Tournament information
- Dates: 4–11 January 1986
- Venue: Lakeside Country Club
- Location: Frimley Green, Surrey
- Country: England
- Organisation(s): BDO
- Format: Sets; Final – best of 11
- Prize fund: £52,500
- Winner's share: £12,000
- High checkout: 161 (Australia) Terry O'Dea

Champion(s)
- (England) Eric Bristow (men's) (England) Mark Day (youth's)

The 1986 BDO World Darts Championship (known for sponsorship reasons as The 1986 Embassy World Darts Championship) was held between 4–11 January 1986. For the first time, the tournament was held at the Lakeside Country Club in Frimley Green, Surrey, having been held at Jollees Cabaret Club in Stoke-on-Trent for the previous seven years. The Lakeside became the third venue in the history of the World Championship.

Eric Bristow completed a hat-trick of World titles to bring his overall tally to five. He would appear in four more finals – but this was to be his last World title.

== Prize money ==
Total Prize fund rose by £9,500 to £52,500 (plus a £51,000 bonus for a nine-dart finish – not won)

- Champion £12,000
- Runner-up £6,000
- Semi-finalists £3,000
- Quarter-finalists £1,700
- 2nd round losers £1,200
- 1st round losers £650
- Non-qualifiers £175
- Highest checkout £1,000

== Seeds ==
1. (England) Eric Bristow
2. (England) John Lowe
3. (England) Dave Whitcombe
4. (England) Cliff Lazarenko
5. (England) Keith Deller
6. (Scotland) Jocky Wilson
7. (England) Bob Anderson
8. (Northern Ireland) Steve Brennan

== The results ==
First round draw took place at the Lakeside on 5 November 1985.

=== Last 32 ===
First round (best of 5 sets)
1	(England) Eric Bristow (89.85)	3
(Wales) Alan Evans (78.45)	1
(Wales) Malcolm Davies (83.07)	3
(Australia) Russell Stewart (82.56)	1
8	(Northern Ireland) Steve Brennan (80.28)	1
(Singapore) Paul Lim (81.39)	3
(Wales) Peter Locke (88.98)	3
(Canada) Bill Steinke (76.74)	0
5	(England) Keith Deller (88.05)	3
(England) Mike Gregory (83.76)	0
(England) Alan Glazier (79.83)	3
(Canada) Bob Sinnaeve (76.17)	1
4	(England) Cliff Lazarenko (86.52)	2
(England) Dave Lee (85.35)	3
(Australia) Terry O'Dea (92.64)	3
(England) Ritchie Gardner (84.12)	1
2	(England) John Lowe (89.04)	3
(Scotland) Robert MacKenzie (84.48)	1
(Northern Ireland) Fred McMullan (81.36)	3
(Scotland) Willie Mands (76.65)	1
7	(England) Bob Anderson (86.94)	3
(England) Bobby George (80.76)	0
(Finland) Kari Saukkonen (73.71)	3
(Belgium) Willy Logie (73.53)	1
6	(Scotland) Jocky Wilson (82.17)	3
(Sweden) Stefan Lord (79.83)	0
(England) Vic Hubbard (81.24)	3
(United States) Tony Payne (80.16)	1
3	(England) Dave Whitcombe (84.78)	3
(Finland) Arto Lintunen (81.48)	1
(Wales) Ceri Morgan (88.08)	3
(United States) Dan Valletto (82.86)	0

Second round (best of 5 sets)
1	(England) Eric Bristow (94.44)	3
(Wales) Malcolm Davies (90.69)	0
(Singapore) Paul Lim (81.06)	0
(Wales) Peter Locke (84.48)	3
5	(England) Keith Deller (84.84)	1
(England) Alan Glazier (79.38)	3
(England) Dave Lee (68.04)	0
(Australia) Terry O'Dea (81.36)	3
2	(England) John Lowe (86.37)	3
(Northern Ireland) Fred McMullan (80.49)	1
7	(England) Bob Anderson (89.58)	3
(Finland) Kari Saukkonen (72.00)	0
6	(Scotland) Jocky Wilson (91.23)	3
(England) Vic Hubbard (78.78)	0
3	(England) Dave Whitcombe (83.16)	3
(Wales) Ceri Morgan (82.32)	2

Quarter-finals (best of 7 sets)
1	(England) Eric Bristow (94.74)	4
(Wales) Peter Locke (90.51)	0
(England) Alan Glazier (80.46)	4
(Australia) Terry O'Dea (78.18)	3
2	(England) John Lowe (93.15)	3
7	(England) Bob Anderson (90.33)	4
6	(Scotland) Jocky Wilson (87.48)	2
3	(England) Dave Whitcombe (90.84)	4

Semi-finals (best of 9 sets)
1	(England) Eric Bristow (92.04)	5
(England) Alan Glazier (82.56)	3
7	(England) Bob Anderson (87.75)	4
3	(England) Dave Whitcombe (89.49)	5

Final (best of 11 sets)
1	(England) Eric Bristow (94.48)	6
3	(England) Dave Whitcombe (90.46)	0

== 1986 BDO World Youth Championship ==
=== Seeds ===
1. (England) Mark Day
2. (Scotland) Sean Bell
3. (England) Lee Woodrow
4. (Australia) Rowan Barry

== Results ==
=== Quarter-finals (best of 3 sets) ===
- (England) Mark Day 2–0 (Singapore) Harith Lim
- (Republic of Ireland) Kieran McCormack 1–2 (Scotland) Sean Bell
- (Belgium) Ferdie Boffel 0–2 (England) Lee Woodrow
- (Australia) Rowan Barry 2–0 (England) Shaun Greatbatch

=== Semi-finals (best of 3 sets) ===
- (England) Mark Day 2–1 (Australia) Rowan Barry
- (Scotland) Sean Bell 1–2 (England) Lee Woodrow

=== Final (best of 5 sets) ===
- (England) Lee Woodrow 0–3 (England) Mark Day
