= Gary Mawson =

Canadian-American darts player

Personal information
- Nickname: "The Mauler"
- Born: May 17, 1963 (age 63) Etobicoke, Ontario, Canada
- Home town: Fort Myers, Florida, U.S.

Sport
- Sport: Darts
- Playing since: 1989
- Darts: 23g Cosmo Signature
- Laterality: Right-handed
- Walk-on music: "Holly Holy" by Neil Diamond

Organisation (see split in darts)
- PDC: 1995–2001, 2007–2020, 2021-
- WDF: 2020–
- Current world ranking: (PDC) NR (5 November 2026)

PDC premier events – best performances
- World Championship: Last 16: 1999
- World Matchplay: Last 16: 1998, 1999
- World Grand Prix: Quarter-finals: 1998
- UK Open: Runner-up: 2008
- Grand Slam: Last 16: 2007
- Desert Classic: Quarter-finals: 2007
- US Open/WSoD: Last 16: 2008

Other tournament wins
- Years
CDC Tour Event	2018, 2024
ADO Broward County Turkey Shoot	2012
ADO Cherry Bomb International	2013, 2016
ADO Harvest Moon Tourney	2012
ADO Youngstown Charity Open	2012
ADO Syracuse Open	2020
Houston Open	2006
Las Vegas Open	1996, 2013
Medal record
Men's Darts
Representing United States
WDF Americas Cup
Gold medal – first place	2008 Port of Spain	Men's singles
Silver medal – second place	2010 Abaco	Men's singles

Gary Mawson (born May 17, 1963) is a Canadian-born American professional darts player. He currently resides in Fort Myers, Florida. Mawson played darts for the US in 2004 and the years immediately following, having previously played darts for Canada up to 2001. Mawson used the nickname The Mauler for his matches.

Mawson's biggest career achievement in darts was in reaching the final of the 2008 UK Open in Bolton, after upsetting the odds and defeating the two-time defending UK Open champion Raymond van Barneveld, 10–8 in the semi-finals. Van Barneveld had never previously lost at the UK Open and had won 16 matches in a row at the event. Mawson lost in the final to James Wade.

== Biography ==
Mawson's parents were born in Britain, and he also lived in Bolton, England for four years between the ages of 3–7 before moving back to Canada. As a result, Mawson holds dual Canadian and British citizenship. After living in the United States for many years, Mawson is now a US citizen.

== Career ==
Gary Mawson first tried to play the darts circuit in Britain in 1989, but that was the year when darts went through a big slump, and he had to return home to Canada. Mawson first entered the Canadian National Darts Championship in 1992 and reached the last 16. When the World Darts Council (now the Professional Darts Corporation – PDC) was first formed in 1994, players from the North American circuit were added to the 14 who broke away from the British Darts Organisation to bring the number of players up to the total required for a tournament. Mawson made his televised debut in darts at the 1995 World Matchplay, where he took an early lead against Phil Taylor, before Taylor came back to win 8–5.

Representing Canada, Mawson appeared at each PDC World Matchplay between 1995 and 2000, at the PDC World Grand Prix in 1998 and 1999, and also at the PDC World Darts Championship between 1996 and 2000. His best performance in these years was to reach the quarter-finals of the 1998 World Grand Prix which remained his best performance in a PDC event until he made it to the quarter-finals of the 2007 Las Vegas Desert Classic, by then representing the USA.

As a result of his performances on the North American circuit including his Vegas quarter-final, he qualified for the inaugural Grand Slam of Darts in 2007 and was back at the World Championships in 2008 for the first time since 2000.

2008 also saw Mawson defeat Raymond van Barneveld in the Last 32 of the US Open, to reach the Last 16 and the televised stages of the tournament. Mawson lost to Ronnie Baxter in the Last 16.

Mawson had a great run in the 2008 UK Open. It was a tournament that Mawson very nearly didn't play in, as he had accidentally left his Canadian passport at JFK airport in New York City. Fortunately for Mawson, he did have his British passport on him, which was enough to allow him into Britain after his arrival at Manchester airport. Mawson defeated Darren Johnson and Mark Frost in the first two rounds, before beating Alex Roy, Mark Lawrence, Mark Dudbridge and Wayne Jones to reach the semi-finals before upsetting reigning champion van Barneveld to reach his first major final. It was the second time that Mawson had beaten van Barneveld in a matter of weeks, but unlike their 2008 US Open Last 32 match which was on the floor, their 2008 UK Open semi final was on a big stage and fully televised, so Mawson's 10–8 win was considered a big upset. This was especially the case because van Barneveld had won the UK Open for the previous 2 years and had won 16 matches in a row at the UK Open without losing at the event (which included 3 Raymond van Barneveld wins over Phil Taylor in 3 consecutive years at the UK Open). Mawson lost in the 2008 UK Open final to James Wade.

During the 2008 UK Open, Mawson became popular with British fans due to his resemblance to then Liverpool manager Rafael Benítez. The resemblance caused chants such as 'Rafa give us a wave...' and 'Rafa Rafael, Rafa Rafael, Rafa Rafael, Rafael Benitez'. After the match, when asked in jest whether he should change his nickname to Rafa, he proclaimed that "Rafael Benitez is changing his name to Gary Mawson. The new manager of Liverpool is Gary Mawson".

Mawson played in the 2008 Grand Slam of Darts, which he earned a place in by reaching the final of the 2008 UK Open but lost out in the group stages.

He represented the United States with Darin Young in the 2012 PDC World Cup of Darts and reached the quarter-finals, where they were defeated by England 1–3, having beaten Germany in the second round. Mawson was responsible for the point picked up against England as he defeated 15-time World Champion Phil Taylor in his singles match.

Mawson threw a nine-dart finish at the Las Vegas Open in 2013 and went on to claim the title by defeating Wes Newton.

After a long time not playing in an official PDC tournament he qualified for the 2019 US Darts Masters by getting one of the ranking places for the tournament before losing to Gerwyn Price 6–4 in the first round.

== World Championship results ==
=== PDC ===
- 1996: Last 24 group ( lost to Peter Evison 0-3 and lost to Steve Raw 0-3)
- 1997: Last 24 group (lost to Bob Anderson 1–3 and beat Eric Bristow 3–1)
- 1998: Last 24 group (beat John Lowe 3–0 and lost to Peter Manley 0–3)
- 1999: Second round (lost to John Ferrell 2–3)
- 2000: First round (lost to Keith Deller 0–3)
- 2008: First round (lost to Kevin Painter 0–3)
- 2011: First round (lost to Phil Taylor 0–3)

== Career finals ==
=== PDC major finals: 1 (1 runner-up) ===
Legend
UK Open (0–1)

Outcome	No.	Year	Championship	Opponent in the final	Score
Runner-up	1.	2008	UK Open	James Wade	7–11 (l)
