= 1999 PDC World Darts Championship =

Tournament information
- Dates: 28 December 1998 – 3 January 1999
- Venue: Circus Tavern
- Location: Purfleet
- Country: England
- Organisation(s): PDC
- Format: Sets; Final – best of 11
- Prize fund: £104,000
- Winner's share: £30,000
- High checkout: 167; Graeme Stoddart; Gary Mawson

Champion(s)
- Phil Taylor

The 1999 PDC World Darts Championship (known for sponsorship reasons as the 1999 Skol World Darts Championship) was held between 28 December 1998 and 3 January 1999 at the Circus Tavern in Purfleet, Essex. After five years, organisers of the Professional Darts Corporation scrapped the group stages and the tournament became a straight knock-out for the first time. The third-place play-off which had been a feature for the previous two years was also abandoned. The field was expanded from 24 to 32 players – the biggest influx of players since the PDC separated from the British Darts Organisation in 1992–93.

Phil Taylor emerged as champion for the fifth successive year, taking his overall tally to seven World Championships.

== Seeds ==
1. (England) Rod Harrington
2. (England) Alan Warriner
3. (England) Phil Taylor
4. (England) Peter Manley
5. (England) Peter Evison
6. (England) Keith Deller
7. (England) Dennis Priestley
8. (United States) Steve Brown

== Prize money ==
The 1999 World Championship featured a prize fund of £104,000. The prize money was allocated as follows:

| Position (num. of players) | | Prize money (Total: £104,000) |
|---|---|---|
| Winner | (1) | £30,000 |
| Runner-Up | (1) | £16,000 |
| Semi-finalists | (2) | £6,000 |
| Quarter-finalists | (4) | £3,000 |
| Second round losers | (8) | £1,750 |
| First round losers | (16) | £1,250 |

== Results ==
Round 1 (best of 5 sets); 28–29 December
1 | (England) Rod Harrington 87.45 | 3
(England) Alex Roy 81.64 | 0
(England) Shayne Burgess 92.21 | 3
(Canada) Scott Cummings 77.03 | 0
8 | (United States) Steve Brown 85.99 | 3
(England) Kevin Spiolek 75.60 | 1
(England) Dean Allsop 69.73 | 0
(England) Cliff Lazarenko 79.21 | 3
5 | (England) Peter Evison 81.00 | 0
(England) Dennis Smith 93.56 | 3
(United States) Dan Lauby 75.52 | 1
(England) Mick Manning 79.14 | 3
4 | (England) Peter Manley 90.18 | 3
(England) Eric Bristow 53.36 | 0
(England) Steve Raw 87.59 | 1
(England) Graeme Stoddart 90.70 | 3
2 | (England) Alan Warriner 86.60 | 3
(Canada) John Part 79.34 | 0
(United States) Sean Downs 82.24 | 2
(England) Harry Robinson 82.74 | 3
7 | (England) Dennis Priestley 85.16 | 0
(England) John Ferrell 86.66 | 3
(United States) Gary Mawson 81.93 | 3
(England) Ritchie Gardner 78.11 | 0
6 | (England) Keith Deller 81.99 | 2
(England) Bob Anderson 87.95 | 3
(United States) Gerald Verrier 65.01 | 1
(Scotland) Jamie Harvey 72.18 | 3
3 | (England) Phil Taylor 105.04 | 3
(England) Reg Harding 87.83 | 0
(England) John Lowe 87.05 | 3
(Singapore) Paul Lim 78.07 | 0

Round 2 (best of 5 sets); 30 December
1 | (England) Rod Harrington 94.16 | 1
(England) Shayne Burgess 90.73 | 3
8 | (United States) Steve Brown 84.34 | 0
(England) Cliff Lazarenko 87.16 | 3
(England) Dennis Smith 92.49 | 3
(England) Mick Manning 84.44 | 1
4 | (England) Peter Manley 88.98 | 3
(England) Graeme Stoddart 79.69 | 0
2 | (England) Alan Warriner 90.67 | 3
(England) Harry Robinson 82.85 | 2
(England) John Ferrell 83.42 | 3
(United States) Gary Mawson 89.68 | 2
(England) Bob Anderson 85.09 | 3
(Scotland) Jamie Harvey 86.09 | 2
3 | (England) Phil Taylor 102.01 | 3
(England) John Lowe 98.73 | 1

Quarter-finals (best of 7 sets); 1 January
(England) Shayne Burgess 94.95 | 4
(England) Cliff Lazarenko 82.23 | 1
(England) Dennis Smith 91.43 | 0
4 | (England) Peter Manley 99.56 | 4
2 | (England) Alan Warriner 84.36 | 4
(England) John Ferrell 77.82 | 1
(England) Bob Anderson 86.42 | 0
3 | (England) Phil Taylor 96.77 | 4

Semi-finals (best of 9 sets); 2 January
(England) Shayne Burgess 94.19 | 4
4 | (England) Peter Manley 98.05 | 5
2 | (England) Alan Warriner 95.00 | 3
3 | (England) Phil Taylor 98.77 | 5

Final (best of 11 sets); 3 January
4 | (England) Peter Manley 93.64 | 2
3 | (England) Phil Taylor 97.18 | 6

== Representation from different countries ==
This table shows the number of players by country in the World Championship. Five countries were represented in the World Championship, one more than in the previous championship.

| | (England) ENG | (United States) USA | (Scotland) SCO | (Canada) CAN | (Singapore) SGP | Total |
|---|---|---|---|---|---|---|
| Final | 2 | 0 | 0 | 0 | 0 | 2 |
| Semis | 4 | 0 | 0 | 0 | 0 | 4 |
| Quarters | 8 | 0 | 0 | 0 | 0 | 8 |
| Round 2 | 13 | 1 | 1 | 1 | 0 | 16 |
| Round 1 | 23 | 4 | 1 | 3 | 1 | 32 |
