= Leighton Rees =

Welsh darts player (1940–2003)

Personal information
- Full name: Leighton Thomas Rees
- Nickname: "Marathon Man"
- Born: 17 January 1940 Ynysybwl, Wales
- Died: 8 June 2003 (aged 63) Ynysybwl, Wales

Sport
- Sport: Darts
- Playing since: 1970
- Laterality: Right-handed
- Walk-on music: Sosban Fach by Max Boyce

Organisation (see split in darts)
- BDO: 1976–1991

WDF major events – best performances
- World Championship: Winner (1): 1978
- World Masters: Quarter-final: 1981

Other tournament wins
- Years
Butlins Grand Masters	1978
Cleveland Darts Extravaganza	1978
Colorado Open	1979
Golden Gate Classic	1981
Indoor League	1974, 1976
WDF World Cup	1977
Welsh Open	1975

Leighton Thomas Rees (17 January 1940 – 8 June 2003) was a Welsh professional darts player who competed in British Darts Organisation (BDO) events. He won the 1978 BDO World Darts Championship, and was formerly ranked world number one. He was one of the sport's most successful players throughout the 1970s, and retired from the game in 1991.

== Early life ==
Rees was born in hospital in Mountain Ash and grew up in the village of Ynysybwl, Glamorgan, where he spent most of his life. He attended the local Mill Street School in Pontypridd where one of his teachers famously declared on his report card that he would be "good only for reading the sports pages of the South Wales Echo". After leaving school he found work in the store room of a motor spares company, a job he did for over twenty years until he became a professional darts player in 1976.

It was during his time working as a store man that Leighton found the sport of darts, becoming a regular for his local pub and county, and playing for Wales in 1970. It was not until 1972 though that he gained any real national attention. Sid Waddell, who later became a commentator for the BBC and Sky Sports, was at the time producer of Yorkshire Television's The Indoor League – a show with pub games tournaments. Waddell and his researchers had heard reports of a trio of great darts players in the South Wales valleys, an area that was quickly becoming a hotbed of talent for the sport. Waddell had already seen Alan Evans of Rhondda play at the Alexandra Palace during the 1972 News of the World Championship, the first darts tournament televised across Britain. The other two names mentioned were Tony Ridler of Newport and Leighton Rees of Ynysybwl.

Waddell quickly offered all three the chance to play on The Indoor League, which started being televised across Britain from 1973, and they did not disappoint, Ridler and Evans both scored a number of 180s in their matches, but although he did not perform as well in 1973, it was Leighton Rees who stole the show. Over a lager and a cigar he told presenter Fred Trueman, in his soon to be famous brand of dry humour, stories about himself and Evans hustling the English. Rees went on to have the most success of any darts player in The Indoor League, becoming the only player to win the darts tournament twice.

== Darts career ==
After twice winning the darts tournament on The Indoor League in 1974 and 1976, Rees turned professional in 1976 and reached the final of that year's News of the World Darts Championship, losing to Bill Lennard from Manchester. Rees was also part of the 1977 Wales team that won the first World Darts Federation World Cup alongside Alan Evans and David "Rocky" Jones.

Rees' finest hour however would come in 1978 at the inaugural Embassy World Professional Darts Championship, in Nottingham. Seeded third he easily dispensed with Australian Barry Atkinson in round one at a score of 6–0 before taking on his close friend, Welsh team-mate and fifth seed Alan Evans in the second round. It turned into a classic with both players averaging over 90 per three darts (almost unheard of in those days). Evans took an early lead with a couple of 180s before Rees recorded the championship's first ten-dart finish (also the first televised) before eventually running out a 6–3 victor. At the time the BBC's executive producer Nick Hunter proclaimed it as the match that made darts live up to all their expectations and cemented it as a National TV item for years to come.

In the semi-final Rees actually struggled to beat a determined American, Nicky Virachkul 8–7 in the semi-finals but showed a whole different set of battling qualities to pull through into a final against his close friend John Lowe. Rees would again average over 90 with Lowe not far behind in a final that was won 11–7 by Rees, achieving his only World Championship title.

In the defence of his title in 1979, Rees returned to the final, again beating Evans along the way before this time losing to Lowe by 5 sets to 0. A quarter-final in 1980 and a last-16 place in 1981 followed, after which Rees could only manage round one exits in 1982, 1983, 1985 and 1990. Despite this his matches nearly always resulted in full arenas and he remained one of darts most popular competitors.

It is because of this that he is often mentioned alongside players such as Lowe, Eric Bristow, Bob Anderson, Jocky Wilson, Cliff Lazarenko and now Phil Taylor for popularising darts on television. On Bullseye, he scored more than 301 with nine darts on at least 6 of 8 appearances and thus having his charity money doubled.

Rees also wrote an autobiographical account of his life in 1979, titled On Darts, which included tips on playing the game.

== Personal life ==
In 1980, Rees married Debbie Ryle, a Californian, in Las Vegas while he was competing in a tournament there. Eric Bristow was best man. Despite being the first world champion, it could be argued that Rees missed out on darts' glory years. The prize for his title was £3,000 and as the prize money rose and tournaments began to spring up all over UK television channels, Rees' form began to slide and by the 1980s he never managed to match the continued success of Lowe, Bristow and Wilson. Rees was forced to make his living from playing exhibition matches with his compatriot and great friend Alan Evans.

== Death ==
Rees quit his exhibition work after having a pacemaker fitted and also had a heart bypass operation in his later life. He returned to the stage of the World Championships to make the draw for the event in the year before his death. He died in his home village, Ynysybwl, in 2003, aged 63. Leighton Rees Close in Ynysybwl is named after him.

== World Championship results ==
=== BDO ===
- 1978: Winner (beat John Lowe 11–7) (legs)
- 1979: Runner-up (lost to John Lowe 0–5) (sets)
- 1980: Quarter-Finals (lost to Bobby George 1–3)
- 1981: 2nd Round (lost to Ceri Morgan 1–2)
- 1982: 1st Round (lost to Angus Ross 0–2)
- 1983: 1st Round (lost to Cliff Lazarenko 0–2)
- 1985: 1st Round (lost to Russell Stewart 1–2)
- 1987: 1st Round (lost to Mike Gregory 0–3)
- 1990: 1st Round (lost to Eric Bristow 0–3)

== Career finals ==
=== BDO major finals: 6 (2 titles) ===
Legend
World Championship (1–1)
British Professional Championship (0–1)
Grand Masters (1–1)
British Matchplay (0–1)

Outcome	No.	Year	Championship	Opponent in the final	Score (Note: (l) = score in legs, (s) = score in sets.)
Winner	1.	1978	World Darts Championship	(England) John Lowe	11–7 (l)
Winner	2.	1978	Butlins Grand Masters	(England) John Lowe	unknown
Runner-up	2.	1979	World Darts Championship	(England) John Lowe	0–5 (s)
Runner-up	3.	1980	Butlins Grand Masters	(England) Bobby George	0–1 (s)
Runner-up	4.	1980	British Matchplay	(Scotland) Jocky Wilson	0–2 (s)
Runner-up	5.	1987	British Professional Championship	(England) Keith Deller	5–7 (s)

=== WDF major finals: 2 (1 title) ===
Legend
World Cup (1–0)
Europe Cup (0–1)

Outcome	No.	Year	Championship	Opponent in the final	Score
Winner	1.	1977	World Cup Singles	(England) Cliff Lazarenko	4–3 (l)
Runner-up	1.	1984	Europe Cup Singles	(England) John Lowe	0–4 (l)

=== Independent major finals: 1 ===
Outcome	No.	Year	Championship	Opponent in the final	Score
Runner-up	1.	1976	News of the World Championship	(England) Bill Lennard	0–2 (l)

== Performance timeline ==
Tournament	1974	1975	1976	1977	1978	1979	1980	1981	1982	1983	1984	1985	1986	1987	1988	1989	1990
BDO World Championship	NYF				W	F	QF	2R	1R	1R	DNP	1R	DNP	1R	DNP		1R
Winmau World Masters	DNP	1R	L16	2R	RR	2R	1R	QF	2R	Did not participate							
British Matchplay	Not held		SF	SF	QF	QF	F	QF	Did not participate								
British Professional Championship	Not held							QF	1R	2R	1R	1R	DNP	F	QF	DNP	
Butlins Grand Masters	Not held			SF	W	QF	F	QF	1R	DNP				Not held			
News of the World Darts Championship	1R	???	F	???													

WDF majors performances
Tournament	Event	World Cup 1977	Euro Cup 1978	World Cup 1979	Euro Cup 1980	World Cup 1981	Euro Cup 1982	World Cup 1983	Euro Cup 1984	World Cup 1985	Euro Cup 1986	World Cup 1987	Euro Cup 1988	World Cup 1989	Euro Cup 1990	World Cup 1991
WDF World Cup & WDF Europe Cup	Singles	W	QF	L16	L16	L32	DNP	L32	RU	L16	DNP	Prelim.	DNP	QF	DNP	L64
WDF World Cup & WDF Europe Cup	Pairs	SF	SF	SF	?	SF	DNP	SF	Prelim.	?	DNP	?	DNP	RR	DNP	L16
WDF World Cup & WDF Europe Cup	Team	W	RU	RU	RU	QF	DNP	SF	QF	L16	DNP	L16	DNP	SF	DNP	RU
WDF World Cup & WDF Europe Cup	Overall	W	3rd	3rd	4th	6th	DNP	3rd	RU	7th	DNP	11th	DNP	7th	DNP	RU

Performance Table Legend
W	Won the tournament	F	Finalist	SF	Semifinalist	QF	Quarterfinalist	#R; RR; Prel.	Lost in # round Round-robin; Preliminary round	DQ	Disqualified
DNQ	Did not qualify	DNP	Did not participate	WD	Withdrew	NH	Tournament not held	#R; RR; Prel.	Lost in # round Round-robin; Preliminary round	NYF	Not yet founded
