= Bill Steinke =

Canadian darts player (born 1947)

Personal information
- Born: Vancouver, Canada
- Home town: Vancouver, Canada

Sport
- Sport: Darts
- Playing since: 1967
- Darts: 20g
- Laterality: Right-handed
- Walk-on music: "Highway to Hell" by AC/DC

Organisation (see split in darts)
- BDO: 1985–1987

WDF major events – best performances
- World Championship: Last 32: 1986

Bill Steinke is a Canadian former professional darts player competed in the 1980s.

His first major win was the British Columbia Open in 1983. Between 1983 and 1986, he won every major tournament on the west coast of Canada and the United States including the Klondike Open, Seattle Open, Oregon Open, San Francisco Open and the St. Pat's Classic in San Diego. He participated in the 1986 BDO World Darts Championship but was defeated in the first round by Welshman Peter Locke. He won the 1985 Canadian National Championship.

Steinke's biggest tournament win was the Los Angeles Open which is the warm-up to the North American Open and had the top players competing from around the world.

== World Championship results ==
=== BDO ===
- 1986: Last 32: (lost to Peter Locke 0–3)
