= Bill Lennard =

English darts player (1934–1996)

Personal information
- Nickname: "Mister Consistency"
- Born: 21 June 1934 Manchester, England
- Died: 6 August 1996 (aged 62) Heywood, England

Sport
- Sport: Darts
- Playing since: 1954
- Laterality: Right-handed

Organisation (see split in darts)
- BDO: 1975–1982

WDF major events – best performances
- World Championship: Quarter-final: 1980
- World Masters: Semi-final: 1975

Other tournament wins
- Years
News of the World Championship	1976
British Matchplay	1976
Swedish Open	1976
WDF World Cup Team	1979

Bill Lennard (21 June 1934 – 6 August 1996) was an English professional darts player from Manchester.

== Darts career ==
Lennard played county darts for Lancashire and there are some minor county events that use his name in memorial tournaments.

He enjoyed a successful year in 1976 by winning the prestigious News of the World Darts Championship (representing the Cotton Tree Inn, Manchester), the British Matchplay and the Swedish Open. The World Professional Darts Championship did not begin until two years later, Lennard made his debut at the championships in 1979 but lost his first round match to Tony Clark.

His best run at the World Championships came in 1980 when he reached the quarter-finals, but was beaten by Tony Brown. Tony Clark again beat Lennard in the first round in 1981 and his last appearance in the World Championship came in 1982 when he was beaten by John Lowe.

Lennard was part of the England team which won the WDF World Cup in 1979.

== World Championship results ==
=== BDO ===
- 1979: First round (lost to Tony Clark 0–2)
- 1980: Quarter finals (lost to Tony Brown 0–3)
- 1981: First round (lost to Tony Clark 1–2)
- 1982: First round (lost to John Lowe 0–2)

== Career finals ==
=== BDO major finals: 2 (1 title, 1 runner-up) ===
Outcome	No.	Year	Championship	Opponent in the final	Score
Winner	1.	1976	British Matchplay	(England) Alan Glazier	4–3 (s)
Runner-up	1.	1979	Butlins Grand Masters	(England) Bobby George	

=== Independent major finals: 1 (1 title) ===
Outcome	No.	Year	Championship	Opponent in the final	Score
Winner	1.	1976	News of the World Championship	(Wales) Leighton Rees	2–0 (l)

== Performance timeline ==
Tournament	1975	1976	1977	1978	1979	1980	1981	1982
BDO World Championship	NYF			DNP	1R	QF	1R	1R
World Masters	SF	3R	DNP			3R	DNP	
British Matchplay	NYF	W	SF	DNP				
British Professional	Not held						1R	DNP
Butlins Grand Masters	NYF		DNP		F	QF	1R	DNP
News of the World	???	W	???					

WDF majors performances
Tournament	Event	World Cup 1979
WDF World Cup & WDF Europe Cup	Singles	QF
WDF World Cup & WDF Europe Cup	Pairs	RU
WDF World Cup & WDF Europe Cup	Team	W
WDF World Cup & WDF Europe Cup	Overall	W
