= Johnny Wood =

Protected area in Cumbria, England

Coordinates: 54°31′06″N 3°09′24″W

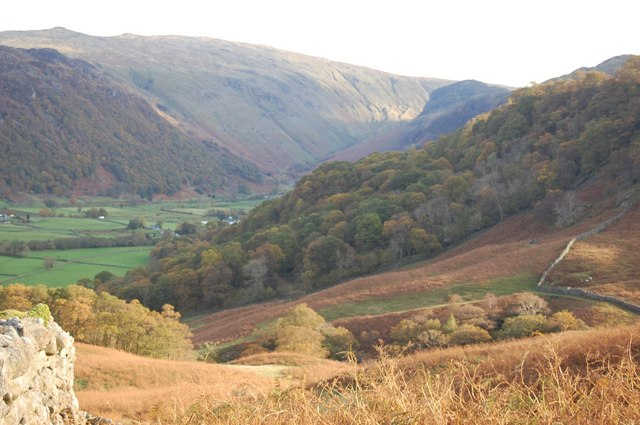
Johnny Wood

Johnny Wood (or Johnny's Wood) is a Site of Special Scientific Interest (SSSI) within the Lake District National Park in Cumbria, England. It is located 300m west of the village of Borrowdale, in the valley of the River Derwent (Borrowdale). This woodland has an exceptional diversity of liverwort species.

Johnny Wood is referred to in the designation of the Lake District as an Important Plant Area. Johnny Wood is also within Borrowdale Rainforest National Nature Reserve.

== Biology ==
Johnny Wood is dominated by sessile oak that favours acidic soils. There are numerous boulders that are important habitat for mosses and liverworts. Moss species include Sematophyllum micans that grows on rock slabs. Fern species include Gymnocarpium dryopteris, Phegopteris connectilis and Hymenophyllum wilsonii. Lichen species include Parmelia laevigata and Parmelia taylorensis.

== Geology ==
Johnny Wood is mostly situated on acidic rocks of the Borrowdale Volcanic Series. This rock contains a few calcareous bands.

== Land ownership ==
All of the land within Johnny Wood SSSI is owned by the National Trust.
