= John Cosnett =

English darts player (1951–2018)

Personal information
- Nickname: "Cossie"
- Born: 11 June 1951 Wednesfield, Wolverhampton, England
- Died: 23 April 2018 (aged 66) Wednesfield, Wolverhampton
- Home town: Wolverhampton, West Midlands, England

Sport
- Sport: Darts
- Playing since: 1971
- Darts: 23g
- Laterality: Right-handed
- Walk-on music: "The Liquidator" by Harry J All Stars

Organisation (see split in darts)
- BDO: 1983–1985, 1990

WDF major events – best performances
- World Championship: Last 16: 1985
- World Masters: Last 16: 1985

Other tournament wins
- Tournament: Years
- Mediterranean Int. Open British Open: 1983; 1985

John Cosnett (11 June 1951 – 23 April 2018) was an English professional darts player who competed in the 1980s and 1990s.

== Career ==
Before turning professional, Cosnett worked as a storekeeper.

Cosnett won the 1984 British Open, beating Welshman Peter Locke in the final. Despite winning one of the biggest prizes in the history of professional darts, Cosnett never managed to meet his new-found expectations, which took him to #16 in the World Rankings. He competed in the 1985 BDO World Darts Championship, and won the opening round against Rab Scott, but was defeated in the second round by his fellow Englishman John Lowe. He also competed in the 1985 Winmau World Masters, defeating Keith Deller in the first round, before losing to Steve Gittins in the last 16 stage. John appeared on ITV's Bullseye in 1985 as the celebrity darts player, and made the highest score of the series – 361. After that, Cosnett never played in any more major tournaments and faded out of mainstream darts.

In 2006, Cosnett suffered a serious stroke which almost killed him, followed by another several months later which he also survived. He blamed the smoking and drinking culture of the 1980s and '90s Darts scene for this. After battling through several more health scares over the following years, he was diagnosed with cancer in 2016. After surviving the initial prognosis of 3 months, he was seemingly doing well through 2017, being cared for by his wife, Cherry. However, after a hospital check in early 2018, it was found the cancer had spread, and he died on 23 April 2018.

== Personal life ==
Cosnett had one daughter (Jane) from his first marriage, and a son (Greg) and daughter (Kirsty) from his second marriage.

== World Championship results ==
=== BDO ===
- 1985: Last 32: (lost to John Lowe 0–3) (sets)
