= John Andersen =

Danish footballer (born 1953)

Personal information
- Full name: John Sølling Andersen
- Date of birth: 12 March 1953 (age 73)
- Place of birth: Frederiksberg, Denmark
- Position: Defender

Senior career*
Years	Team	Apps	(Gls)
1972–1985	B1903		

International career
1975–1979	Denmark	17	(0)
- * Club domestic league appearances and goals

John Sølling Andersen (born 12 March 1953) is a Danish former footballer who played as a defender for B1903. He made 17 appearances for the Denmark national team from 1975 to 1979.
