= David Miller (darts player) =

American darts player

Dave Miller
Personal information
- Nickname: "Shamu"

Sport
- Sport: Darts
- Playing since: 1979
- Darts: 15g
- Laterality: Right-handed

Organisation (see split in darts)
- BDO: 1981–1983

WDF major events – best performances
- World Championship: Quarter Final: 1982
- World Masters: Last 64: 1981, 1983

Other tournament wins
- Tournament: Years
- Windy City Open Camellia Classic: 1981; 1983

David Miller is an American former professional darts player who competed in the 1980s.

== Career ==
Miller competed in the 1982 BDO World Darts Championship, defeating Gordon Allpress in the first round and Tony Brown in the second round 2–0, but was defeated in the quarter-final by Scotland's Jocky Wilson.

Miller quit the BDO in 1983.

== World Championship results ==
=== BDO ===
- 1982: Quarter Finals (lost to Jocky Wilson 0–4)
