= Willie Mands =

British darts player

Sport
- Sport: Darts
- Playing since: 1981
- Laterality: Right-handed

Organisation (see split in darts)
- BDO: 1985–1986

WDF major events – best performances
- World Championship: Last 32: 1986
- World Masters: Last 64: 1985

Other tournament wins
- Tournament: Years
- Scottish Masters: 1985

Willie Mands is a Scottish former darts player. Mands played in the 1986 World Professional Darts Championship, losing 3–1 in sets to Fred McMullan. Mands was previously a winner of the Scottish Masters in 1985.

== World Championship results ==
=== BDO ===
- 1986: Last 32: (lost to Fred McMullan 1–3) (sets)
