= Claxton Bay =

- Town
- Location within Trinidad and Tobago Location within the Caribbean Location within North America
- Coordinates: 10°20.428′N 61°27.329′W
- Country: Trinidad and Tobago
- Region: Couva-Tabaquite-Talparo

Population (2011)
  - Total: 14,436
- Time zone: UTC−4 (AST)
- Postal code(s): 56xxxx
- Area code: 868

Claxton Bay is a community in the Republic of Trinidad and Tobago. It is located in Central Trinidad, south of Couva and Chaguanas and north of San Fernando and is administered by the Couva–Tabaquite–Talparo Regional Corporation. Olympic cyclist Hylton Mitchell was born here.
