= MFI World Matchplay =

Tournament information
- Venue: Fulcrum Centre, Slough (1984-85), Festival Hall, Basildon (1986-88)
- Country: England
- Established: 1984
- Organisation(s): BDO Major (5 editions)
- Format: Sets
- Final Year: 1988

Final champion(s)
- (England) Eric Bristow

The MFI World Matchplay championship was a major darts tournament organised by the British Darts Organisation.

The tournament only lasted for five years but is historic in darts as it featured the first ever televised nine-dart finish on 13 October 1984 when John Lowe won £102,000 for the perfect game of darts against Keith Deller. Lowe went on to win the title that year.

== MFI World Matchplay finals ==
The complete list of final results:

Year	Champion (average in final)	Score	Runner-up (average in final)	Prize money			Sponsor	Venue
Year	Champion (average in final)	Score	Runner-up (average in final)	Total	Champion	Runner-up	Sponsor	Venue
1984	(England) John Lowe	5–3	(England) Cliff Lazarenko	£36,000	£12,000	£5,000	MFI	Fulcrum Centre, Slough
1985	(England) Eric Bristow	5–4	(England) Bob Anderson	£41,000	£15,000	£6,000	MFI	Fulcrum Centre, Slough
1986	(England) Mike Gregory	5–1	(Scotland) Jocky Wilson	£41,000	£15,000	£6,000	MFI	Festival Hall, Basildon
1987	(England) Bob Anderson	5–1	(England) John Lowe	£47,400	£18,000	£7,000	MFI	Festival Hall, Basildon
1988	(England) Eric Bristow (92.91)	5–1	(Canada) Bob Sinnaeve (88.38)	£52,000	£21,000	£7,500	MFI	Festival Hall, Basildon

== Finalists ==
Rank	Player	Won	Runner-up	Finals
1	(England) Eric Bristow	2	0	2
2	(England) Bob Anderson	1	1	2
2	(England) John Lowe	1	1	2
4	(England) Mike Gregory	1	0	1
5	(England) Cliff Lazarenko	0	1	1
5	(Canada) Bob Sinnaeve	0	1	1
5	(Scotland) Jocky Wilson	0	1	1

== Nine-dart finish ==
John Lowe threw the first ever televised nine-dart finish on 13 October 1984 against Keith Deller. As well as for being the first, it stands out for the rarity of the final visit combination.

Player	Year (+Round)	Method	Opponent	Result	Prize
(England) John Lowe	1984, Quarter-Final	3 x T20; 3 x T20; T17, T18, D18	(England) Keith Deller	3–1	£102,000

== Media coverage ==
The tournament was broadcast on ITV and originally came from The Fulcrum Centre, Slough, before moving to Festival Hall, Basildon. The tournament ceased after the 1988 tournament due to ITV announcing that they were pulling out of darts coverage altogether.

== Sponsors ==
Sponsor	Years
MFI	1984–88

== See also ==
- MFI World Matchplay draws
