= John Lowe (footballer) =

Scottish footballer and manager

Personal information
- Full name: John Lowe
- Date of birth: 6 August 1912
- Place of birth: Cambuslang, Scotland
- Date of death: 16 August 1995 (aged 83)
- Place of death: Lochranza, Isle of Arran, Scotland
- Position: Centre-half

Senior career*
Years	Team	Apps	(Gls)
–	Motherwell Juniors		
1933–1934	Royal Albert		
1934–1935	Clyde	16	(66)
1935–1939	Hamilton Academical	68	(1)
1935	→ Royal Albert (loan)		
Total		73	(1)

Managerial career
- 1956–1958: Hamilton Academical
- * Club domestic league appearances and goals

John Lowe (6 August 1912 – 16 August 1995) was a footballer and manager for Hamilton Academical.

== Playing career ==
Lowe, a centre-half, signed for Hamilton Academical in August 1935 from Royal Albert. He also played for Galston and Clyde. He scored on his debut for Accies in January 1936 against Airdrieonians. Hamilton finished sixth in the First Division in 1935–36, eighth in 1936–37, 13th in 1937–38, and seventh in 1938–39.

Lowe served with the Royal Air Force during the Second World War. He was also a member of the Tommy Walker XI Touring Team, which toured India and Ceylon in 1945. Hamilton allowed Lowe to sign for Blackpool in 1940 as he was stationed there. In April 1945, he also guested for Port Vale, where he played two games. He also guested for Wolverhampton Wanderers and Aberdeen.

== Management career ==
Lowe became Hamilton's club secretary in 1951 and was appointed as an assistant manager at Douglas Park in 1953. He became manager in 1956 after replacing former teammate Jacky Cox. He led the Second Division club to 11th and 10th place in 1956–57 and 1957–58. However, he resigned from the position in 1958 and was replaced by Andy Paton.

== Later life ==
After retiring from football, Lowe ran a fruit merchant business in Hamilton. At the time of his death, on 16 August 1995, he was residing in Lochranza on the Isle of Arran.

== Career statistics ==
- Player

Scottish Football League		Scottish Cup		Total	
App	Goals	App	Goals	App	Goals
68	1	4	0	72	1

- Manager

From	To	Record						
From	To	G	W	L	D	F	A	Win %
1956	1958	72	26	29	17	139	147	36.11
