= Jan Larsen (darts player) =

Danish darts player

Personal information
- Born: 25. Maj 1954; Denmark
- Home town: Denmark

Sport
- Sport: Darts
- Playing since: 1972
- Laterality: Right-handed

Organisation (see split in darts)
- BDO: 1980–1981

WDF major events – best performances
- World Championship: Last 32: 1981
- World Masters: Last 32: 1980

Other tournament wins
- Tournament: Years
- Danish National Ch'ship Nordic Ch'ship: 1978, 1980 1980

Jan Larsen is a Danish former professional darts player.

== Career ==
Larsen is a 2-time Danish Champion, who was picked 12 times for the national team

He was the first Dane to represent Denmark at the BDO World darts Championships - in 1981 he played Luc Marreel and lost narrowly 2-1.

During the late 1970s and early 1980s, Larsen was a dominating figure in Danish and Scandinavian darts, winning a total of 9 Danish Championships and 3 Nordic Championships (single, pairs and team events).

== World Championship results ==
=== BDO ===
- 1982: 2nd Round (lost to Luc Marreel 1-2) (sets)
