= Tom Sawyer (darts player) =

Personal information
- Full name: Thomas Sawyer
- Nickname: "Todays"
- Born: 15 December 1968 (age 57) Peabody, Massachusetts, United States
- Home town: Peabody, Massachusetts, United States

Sport
- Sport: Darts
- Playing since: 1994
- Darts: 22g
- Laterality: Right-handed
- Walk-on music: "Tom Sawyer" by Rush

Organisation (see split in darts)
- BDO: 2005–2020
- WDF: 2005–
- Current world ranking: (WDF) 124 ▼11 (August 17, 2026)

WDF major events – best performances
- World Championship: Preliminary Round: 2017
- World Masters: Last 32: 2017

Other tournament wins
- Years
ADO Cherry Bomb International	2012
ADO Ghost On The Coast	2011
ADO Houston Open	2011
ADO Long Island Fall Classic	2011
ADO Maryland Open	2011
ADO Montachusett Winter Classic	2011
ADO North Jersey Dart Classic	2011
ADO Sunday River Open	2011
ADO Tri City Open	2012
ADO White Mountain Shootout	2015, 2016
Cleveland Darts Extraveganza	2016
Colorado Open	2012
Houston Open	2010
Music City Open	2015
Port City Open	2011
USA Dart Classic	2016
Virginia Beach Dart Classic	2011
Witch City Open	2013, 2017

Thomas "Tom" Sawyer (born December 15, 1968) is an American professional darts player who currently plays in the World Darts Federation (WDF) events. He qualified for the 2017 BDO World Darts Championship.

== Career ==
In 2012, Sawyer reached the Quarter-final of the WDF World Cup Singles. In 2014 he reached the Semi-final of the WDF Americas Cup Singles. He qualified for the 2017 BDO World Darts Championship where he lost 0-3 to Paul Hogan in the preliminary round.

== World Championship results ==
=== BDO ===
- 2017: Preliminary round (lost to Paul Hogan 0-3) (sets)
