= Peter Locke (darts player) =

Welsh darts player

Personal information
- Full name: Peter Locke
- Nickname: "Bomper"
- Born: 14 August 1956 (age 70) Merthyr Tydfil, Wales

Sport
- Sport: Darts
- Playing since: 1975
- Darts: 26 Gram
- Laterality: Right-handed
- Walk-on music: "Never Let Me Down Again" by Depeche Mode

Organisation (see split in darts)
- BDO: 1982–1996
- PDC: 2006

WDF major events – best performances
- World Championship: Quarter-finals: 1984, 1986
- World Masters: Last 32: 1984, 1986, 1991, 1992

PDC premier events – best performances
- UK Open: Last 128: 2006

Other tournament wins
- Tournament: Years
- MFI World Pairs Welsh Classic: 1987; 1982, 1991

Peter Locke is a Welsh former professional darts player.

== Darts career ==
Locke made his World Championship debut in the 1983 BDO World Darts Championship, losing in the first round to Terry O'Dea. A year later in the 1984 BDO World Darts Championship, he reached the quarter-finals, defeating Russell Stewart in the first round and then Malcolm Davies in the second round before losing to the eventual champion Eric Bristow in a 5-0 whitewash. In the 1985 BDO World Darts Championship, he lost in the first round to Fred McMullan. Locke then reached the final of the 1985 British Open, losing to John Cosnett. In the 1986 BDO World Darts Championship, Locke succeeded in reaching the quarter-final for the second time by defeating Canadian Bill Steinke in the first round and then Singapore player Paul Lim in the second round before losing again to Bristow in another whitewash with Bristow again going on to win his third successive world championship. Locke made one more appearance in the world championships in 1987, losing in the first round Bob Anderson. Peter Locke/Eric Bristow also lost in the 1986 MFI world pairs final. Then went on to become MFI world pairs champions a year later in 1987 [Locke/Bristow] who then beat John Lowe and Tony Payne for the 1987 title.

Locke also played in the Winmau World Masters four times, and lost in the first round each time: losing in 1984 to Steve Brennan, in 1986 to Stewart, in 1991 to Donnie MacLean, and in 1992 to Keith Sullivan. Locke, having lost to Norman Fletcher in the 2006 Budweiser UK Open.

Locke quit the PDC in 2006.

== World Championship results ==
=== BDO ===
- 1983: 1st round (lost to Terry O'Dea 0–2)
- 1984: Quarter-finals (lost to Eric Bristow 0–5)
- 1985: 1st round (lost to Fred McMullan 0–2)
- 1986: Quarter-finals (lost to Eric Bristow 0–4)
- 1987: 1st round (lost to Bob Anderson 0–3)
