= Gordon Allpress =

New Zealand darts player (born 1949)

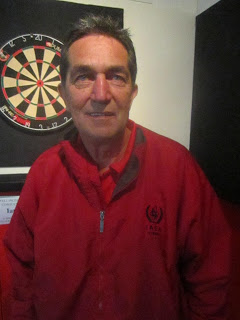

Personal information
- Full name: Gordon James Allpress
- Nickname: Gordy
- Born: 12 June 1949 (age 77) Christchurch, New Zealand
- Home town: Christchurch, New Zealand

Sport
- Sport: Darts
- Playing since: 1970
- Darts: 18 Gram Puma Darts Signature
- Laterality: Right-handed
- Walk-on music: "Ring of Fire" by Johnny Cash

Organisation (see split in darts)
- BDO: 1978–1992, 2003–2016

WDF major events – best performances
- World Championship: Last 32: 1981, 1982
- World Masters: Last 128: 1987

Other tournament wins
- Tournament: Years
- New Zealand Open WDF Pacific Cup Pairs: 1986; 1986
- Updated on 7 May 2021

Gordon James Allpress (born 12 June 1949) is a New Zealand former professional darts player who competed in the 1970s, 1980s, and 1990s before retiring in 1992. He eventually made a short comeback in 2003. Allpress finished 5th at the 1985 World Darts Federation (WDF) World Cup. He defeated former World No. 1 Leighton Rees in the last 16 before losing to the World No. 1 at the time, Eric Bristow 4–1, in the quarter-final. Allpress' performance helped him reach No. 8 in the world rankings. He is nicknamed Gordy.

== Early life ==
Allpress played rugby and rugby league before he started playing darts in a Saturday league team for the Woolston Working Men's Club in 1970 at the age of 21. His Mother and Aunty played darts and they were who introduced him to the game. The very first season he played he never won a singles match and was ribbed much by his teammates. In those days you played a round robin of pairs and then one game of singles. In 1972 he watched the Australasian Darts Championships when they were held in Lower Hutt. That was an annual competition which no longer exists between the Australian states and New Zealand. He decided he wanted to be part of that and by 1973 he was in the New Zealand team.

== Career ==
Allpress has won the New Zealand men's singles title six times (1978,1985,1986,1987,1992, 2003) and is the only player in history to win the New Zealand singles three years in a row. Allpress has also won the New Zealand Men's Open (1986), the New Zealand Men's Pairs twice with partner Barry Whittaker (1986, 1991), the New Zealand Mixed Pairs twice (1980,1987) and the New Zealand Husband and Wife (1973) He has won every New ZealandZ title at least once. He has also represented New Zealand in four World Cups and four Pacific Cup Tournaments, and he was a part of the first ever New Zealand team to win the Pacific Cup in Hawaii in 1984. Allpress competed in the 1980 and 1981 Embassy BDO World Darts Championships but was defeated by Scotland's Jocky Wilson in 1981 and by the American darts player Dave Miller in the first round in 1982. Allpress was also a New Zealand Darts Council Director for five years.

Allpress has played in various parts of the World. Australia, England and Hawaii representing New Zealand. He played in the Embassy World Championships twice. He was part of a New Zealand team of himself, Rob Furmage, Lilian Barnett and Janie Karena who were the first New Zealand team to win the Asia Pacific Cup. He played in World Cups in Copenhagen, Nelson and Brisbane. He has played in Pacific Cups in Melbourne and Auckland. Won a men's pairs in those competitions with Barry Whittaker and mixed pairs with Lottie Chalcraft. Domestically he has been involved in many Canterbury Region teams, South island teams and won many titles. So many he has probably forgotten many of them. One highlight for him was winning the New Zealand singles the year he retired in 1992 and then after being absent from darts for 11 years coming out of retirement and winning the New Zealand singles in 2003.

== World Championship results ==
=== BDO ===
- 1981: Last 32: (lost to Jocky Wilson 0–2) (sets)
- 1982: Last 32: (lost to Dave Miller 1–2)
