= Doug McCarthy =

English darts player

Personal information
- Full name: Douglas McCarthy
- Born: Tow Law

Sport
- Sport: Darts
- Darts: 25g Elkadart
- Laterality: Right-handed
- Walk-on music: "Don't Look Back in Anger" by Oasis

Organisation (see split in darts)
- BDO: 1978–1985
- PDC: 2001–2008

WDF major events – best performances
- World Championship: Last 16: 1979, 1980, 1982
- World Masters: Last 16: 1978, 1979, 1980, 1982

PDC premier events – best performances
- World Grand Prix: Last 32: 2001

Other tournament wins
- Tournament: Years
- Golden Darts Pairs: 1978
Medal record
Men's Darts
Representing England
WDF Europe Cup
Gold medal – first place	1978 Copenhagen	Men's overall
Bronze medal – third place	1978 Copenhagen	Men's singles

Douglas McCarthy is an English former professional darts player who played in British Darts Organisation (BDO) events in the 1970s and 1980s.

== Career ==
McCarthy played in four BDO World Darts Championships. In 1979, he beat Charlie Ellix in the first round but lost in round two to John Lowe. In 1980, McCarthy beat Conrad Daniels in round one before losing to Jocky Wilson in the second round. In 1981, McCarthy lost in the first round to Ceri Morgan and 1982 he beat Jerry Umberger in round one but lost in round two to Bobby George. McCarthy also played in four World Masters tournaments but failed to reach the quarter-final stage.

McCarthy also represented England on 19 occasions and was a member of the England Team including Eric Bristow and John Lowe which won the Europe Cup in 1978.

Almost 20 years after his last televised appearance, McCarthy qualified the PDC World Grand Prix in Ireland but lost in the first round to former World Champion Richie Burnett. McCarthy is still active in the game, most recently playing in the 2008 Isle of Man Open and still playing Super League darts in County Durham.

== World Championship results ==
=== BDO ===
- 1979: 2nd round (lost to John Lowe 0–2) (sets)
- 1980: 2nd round (lost to Jocky Wilson 0–2)
- 1981: 1st round (lost to Ceri Morgan 1–2)
- 1982: 2nd round (lost to Bobby George 1–2)
