= Terry O'Dea =

Australian darts player (1945–2021)

Personal information
- Full name: Terence O'Dea
- Nickname: The Sydney Flinger
- Born: 3 May 1945 Perth, Australia
- Died: 18 May 2021 (aged 76) Sydney, Australia
- Home town: Rivervale, Australia

Sport
- Sport: Darts
- Playing since: 1965
- Darts: 26g
- Laterality: Right-handed
- Walk-on music: "Down Under" by Men at Work

Organisation (see split in darts)
- BDO: 1978–1988

WDF major events – best performances
- World Championship: Quarter Finals: 1982, 1986
- World Masters: Quarter Finals: 1984

Other tournament wins
- Tournament: Years
- WDF Pacific Cup Singles WDF Pacific Cup Pairs: 1982; 1982

Terence O'Dea (3 May 1945 – 18 May 2021) was an Australian professional darts player who competed in the 1970s and 1980s.

== Career ==
O'Dea joined the BDO in March 1978.

O'Dea played in ten successive BDO World Darts Championships with his best run coming in 1982 and 1986 where he reached the quarter-finals. O'Dea also played in four World Masters tournaments, reaching the quarter-finals in 1984.

He appeared on the UK television show Bullseye presented by Jim Bowen in 1984 where he scored 300 points (in 9 darts) for charity. He appeared two years later and scored 305.

O'Dea quit the BDO in 1988.

== World Championship results ==
=== BDO ===
- 1979: 2nd Round (lost to Eric Bristow 0–2) (sets)
- 1980: 2nd Round (lost to Tony Brown 0–2)
- 1981: 1st Round (lost to Eric Bristow 0–2)
- 1982: Quarter Finals (lost to John Lowe 1–4)
- 1983: 2nd Round (lost to John Lowe 2–3)
- 1984: 1st Round (lost to Jocky Wilson 0–2)
- 1985: 1st Round (lost to John Lowe 1–2)
- 1986: Quarter Finals (lost to Alan Glazier 3–4)
- 1987: 1st Round (lost to Rick Ney 1–3)
- 1988: 1st Round (lost to Jocky Wilson 1–3)

=== BDO major finals: 1 (1 runner-up) ===
Outcome	No.	Year	Championship	Opponent in the final	Score (Note: (l) = score in legs, (s) = score in sets.)
Runner-up	1.	1985	Butlins Grand Masters	(England) Eric Bristow	3–5 (l)
