= The Indoor League =

British TV game show (1971–1977)

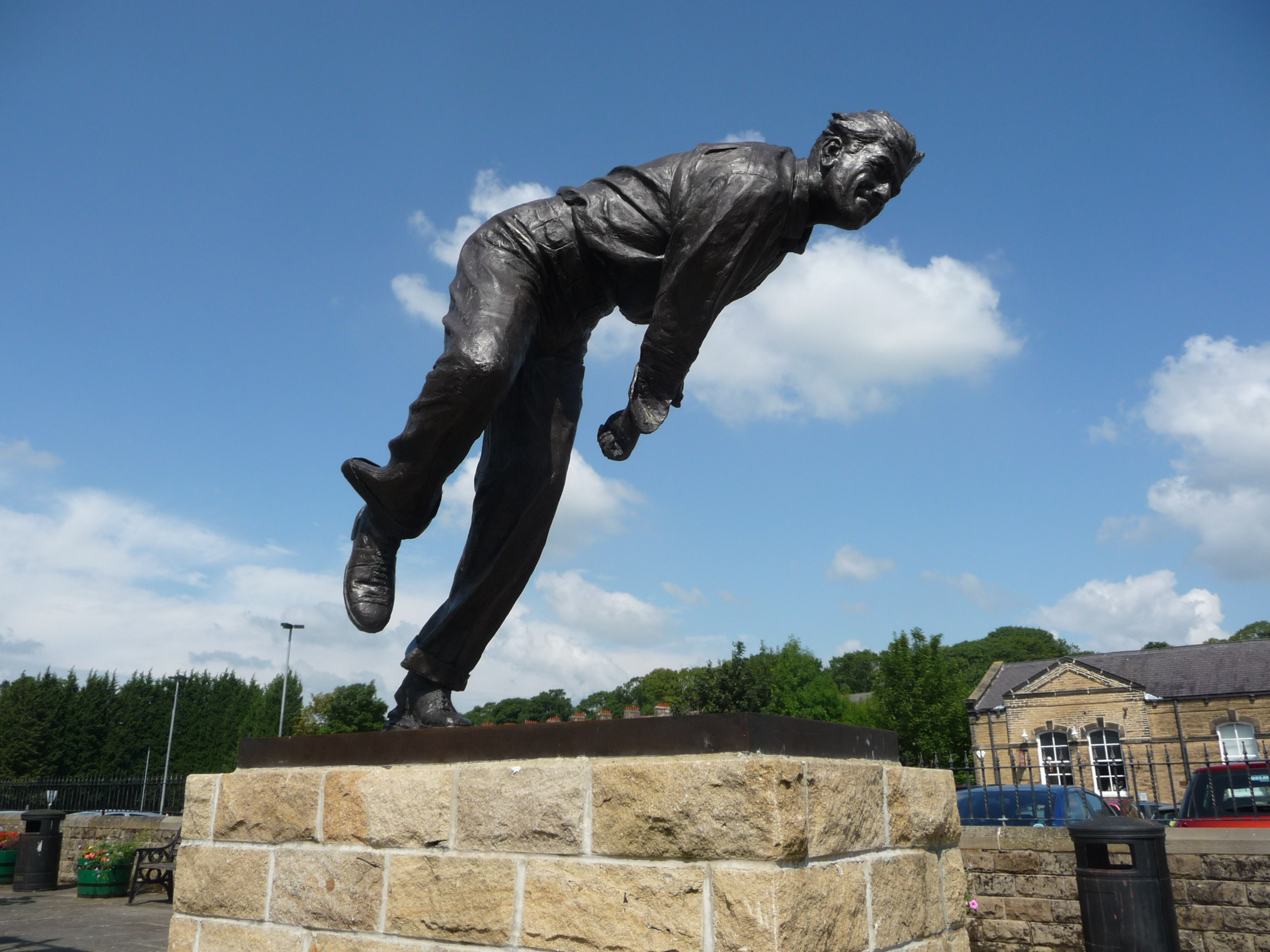
Statue of Trueman in Skipton by Graham Ibbeson

The Indoor League is a pub games competition series that was produced by Yorkshire Television and aired from 1973 until 1977. The programme was hosted by former England cricketer Fred Trueman.

== Background ==
The first series of The Indoor League began transmission, by ITV, on 5 April 1973 at 1 pm and ran for the following six weeks. The TV Times magazine dated 31 March 1973 contains a one-and-a-half-page editorial on it, featuring noted darts player Tom Barrett. Most of the competitions were filmed the year before transmission. From series 2 onwards, The Indoor League made its various competitions open to international competitors, and they played for the Indoor League World Championships.

Presenter Fred Trueman often wore a cardigan and smoked a pipe throughout his links. He always ended the show with the Yorkshire dialect phrase, "ah'll see thee". The programme's theme tune was Waiting For You by André Brasseur.

The show featured many indoor games, the majority of which were pub games, each of which had a prize of £100 for the competition winners. The sports included darts, pool, bar billiards, bar skittles, table football (a.k.a. foosball), arm wrestling and shove ha'penny amongst others. Among the commentators were Dave Lanning and Keith Macklin. The programme was broadcast from The Leeds Irish Centre, which was later recognised as the 'birthplace of television darts'

The Indoor League was created by Sid Waddell, who also produced the series from 1972 to 1976. Darts coverage on television was in its infancy, with the News of the World Darts Championship having just begun to be broadcast on ITV in 1972. Waddell would later go on to become one of the voices of darts on television when the World Championship was created in 1978.

In the first series, all darts matches were played on a Northern England "doubles dartboard" that does not have any treble scoring segments. The competition was restricted to players from within the Yorkshire Television region but, due to the programme's success, from the second series onwards the men's and women's darts competitions were open to all players from around the globe, and they played for the Indoor League World Darts Championships. In the final series there was also an international mixed darts tournament. The winner of the first competition received £100, with the runner-up getting £50. From the 1974 Season onwards, the winner of the men's darts tournament qualified for the BDO World Masters the following year.

The first two series were released on DVD by Network Releasing but are now out of print. All available episodes were repeated by now defunct UK digital channel FrontRunner TV.

== Series air dates ==
Series	Tournament year	From	To	Episodes
1	1972	5 April 1973	10 May 1973	6
2	1973	27 September 1973	11 April 1974	13
3	1974	8 January 1975	2 April 1975	12
4	1975	1 January 1976	25 March 1976	15
5	1976	7 Feb 1977 (regions); 10 Feb 1977 (Yorkshire TV)	2 May 1977 (regions); 5 May 1977 (Yorkshire TV)	13
6	1977	9 January 1978	7 April 1978	13

According to the ITV listing magazine TV Times, programmes were shown by the different ITV regions on different days of the week and at different times across their schedules. Some ITV regions showed an episode of the programme one or more weeks later than other ITV regions. The details above are taken from TV Times.

== Tournament winners ==
=== The Indoor League Men's Darts Championships ===
- 1972 (England) Colin Minton beat (England) Charles Ellis 2–0 (Played on a Yorkshire dartboard)
- 1973 (Republic of Ireland) Tommy O'Regan beat (Wales) Alan Evans 2–0
- 1974 (Wales) Leighton Rees beat (Wales) Alan Evans 2-1
- 1975 (United States) Conrad Daniels beat (England) Cliff Inglis (Championship of Champions)
- 1976 (Wales) Leighton Rees beat (England) Charlie Ellix 3–0 (Indoor League World Championship)
- 1977 (England) Tony Brown beat (Wales) David "Rocky" Jones 3-2 (Indoor League World Championship)

=== The Indoor League Ladies' Darts Championships ===
- 1973 (England) Loveday King beat (England) Jessie Catterick 2–0
- 1974 (Sweden) Greta Hallgren beat (Wales) Millie Bergeson 2–1
- 1975 (England) Jean Dickinson beat (England) Brenda Simpson 2–1 (Championship of Champions)
- 1976 (England) Jean Dickinson beat (England) Margaret Lally 2–0 (Indoor League World Championship)
- 1977 (Wales) Sandra Gibb vs (England) Margaret Lally (Indoor League World Championship)

=== The Indoor League Mixed Pairs' Darts World Championship ===
- 1977 (England) Ken Brown & (Wales) Sandra Gibb beat (Australia) Kevin White & (England) Lynn Stewart (Indoor League World Championship)

=== Indoor League Bar Billiards Championships ===
- 1972 (Wales) "Taffy" John 2,820–1,450 (England) Malcolm Rider
- 1973 (England) John Baker 2,400–1,440 (England) Peter Wells
- 1974 (England) John Peters 4,200–3,050 (England) John Baker
- 1975 (England) Roy Buckle 900–? (England) Alan Sales
- 1976 (England) Stan Pratt beat (England) Gerry Lambert
- 1977 Not held

After the second series, The Indoor League Bar Billiards added the unusual rule of a 45-second maximum break limit. This was to allow full games to be shown during the 18-minute TV as breaks in bar billiards can go on for long periods of time.

=== Indoor League Arm Wrestling Championships ===
- 1972 Not held
- 1973 (England) Donald "Buster" Witney beat (England) "King" Ben Boothman 1–0

(Ben Boothman went on to have a successful wrestling career as King Ben with ITV's World of Sport Wrestling)

- 1974 (England) Clive Myers beat (England) Tony Lees 2–1
- 1975 Right-handed – (England) Tony Fitton beat (England) Tony Lees

(Tony Fitton left the UK shortly after this season to work in the USA. He was exposed in a Sports Illustrated exclusive in 2008 as being the so-called "Godfather of Steroids", contributing to the major steroid problem in American Sports during the 80s and 90s)

- 1975 Left-handed – (England) Bill Richardson beat (England) Paul Jordan

(Bill only entered the left handed competition because all the spots in the right handed competition was taken. He later won Universe Championships Mr Universe in 1980)

- 1976 Under 200 lb – (England) Clive Myers beat (England) Joe Graham 2–0
- 1976 Left-handed – (England) Mike Winch beat (England) Alan Jackson
- 1976 Super heavyweight – (England) Bill Richardson beat (England) Donald "Buster" Witney 2–0
- 1977 Under 200 lb – (England) Clive Myers vs Bob Szpalek
- 1977 Left-handed – (England) Mike Winch vs Ray Harradene?
- 1977 Super Heavyweight – (England) Bill Richardson vs ?

=== Indoor League American Pool Championships ===
- 1972 Not held
- 1973 (England) John Ashcroft 1–0 (England) Ray Edmonds
- 1974 (England) Willie Thorne 3–0 (England) Ray Edmonds
- 1975 (England) Ray Edmonds 2–1 (England) Willie Thorne
- 1976 Not held
- 1977 (England) Phil Tyas vs (England) Dean Emmott

=== Indoor League Table Skittles Championships ===
- 1972 (England) Philip Senior beat (England) Dennis Jones
- 1973 (England) John Chell beat (England) William Woolwich
- 1974–1977 Not held

=== Indoor League Table Football Championships ===
- 1972 John Kropacz & Frank Bowett 6–0 Eric Crane & Stephen Kelly
- 1973 Speedy Campbell & Bervis Harris 6–3 John Kropacz & Frank Bowett
- 1974 Nelly Nelson & John McKrith 6–5 John Kropacz & Frank Bowett
- 1975–1977 Not held

=== Indoor League Shove Ha'Penny Championships ===
- 1972 Alan Brown beat Barry Stones
- 1973 Bryn Turner beat Alan Brown
- 1974–1977 Not held

== 1972 Indoor League Men's Darts Results ==
1st round Best of 3 legs
(England) Ballam Bolton on Dearne	2
(England) Sykes Huddersfield
England Barnsley
(England) Colin Minton Easingwold	2
(England) Twigg Sheffield
(England) Gerry Haywood Dewsbury	2
(England) Dodds Conisbrough
(England) Graham Elvidge Scarborough	2
(England) John Walker Hull	2
(England) Hornby Upton, Lincs
(England) Bob Crosland Knottingley	1
(England) Keith Naylor Scunthorpe	2
(England) McDonald Wombwell
(England) Les Mills Hull	2
(England) Reid Hull
(England) Charles Ellis Bradford	2

Quarter-finals; Best of 3 legs
(England) Ballam Bolton on Dearne
(England) Colin Minton Easingwold	2
(England) Gerry Haywood Dewsbury	2
(England) Graham Elvidge Scarborough
(England) John Walker Hull	2
(England) Keith Naylor Scunthorpe	1
(England) Les Mills Hull	1
(England) Charles Ellis Bradford	2

Semi-finals; Best of 3 legs
(England) Colin Minton Easingwold	2
(England) Gerry Haywood Dewsbury	1
(England) John Walker Hull	0
(England) Charles Ellis Bradford	2

Final; Best of 3 legs
(England) Colin Minton Easingwold	2
(England) Charles Ellis Bradford	0

All matches were played on a Northern England dartboard that does not have any treble scoring segments. The 1972 darts tournament was limited to players within the Yorkshire TV region. The winner received £100 and the runner up £50. There was no women's darts tournament in 1972. Only the final, two semi-finals and two of the quarter-finals were transmitted during the 1972 series of six episodes.

== 1973 Indoor League Men's Darts Results ==
1st round Best of 3 legs
1	(Republic of Ireland) Tommy O'Regan	2
(England) Cliff Inglis	0
(England) Frank Crolla	2
(England) Ivor Hodgkinson	1
(England) Des Stabb	2
(England) Willie Etherington	1
(England) Ron Church	2
(England) Charlie Ellis	1
(Wales) Tony Ridler	2
(Scotland) Harry Heenan	0
(England) Colin Minton	2
(Australia) George Foster	0
(Scotland) Bob Whyte	2
(Australia) John Kelly	1
(England) Gerry Haywood	1
(Wales) Alan Evans	2

Quarter-finals; Best of 3 legs
(Republic of Ireland) Tommy O'Regan	2
(England) Frank Crolla	0
(England) Des Stabb	2
(England) Ron Church	1
(Wales) Tony Ridler	2
(England) Colin Minton	1
(Scotland) Bob Whyte	0
(Wales) Alan Evans	2

Semi-finals; Best of 3 legs
(Republic of Ireland) Tommy O'Regan (76.85)	2
(England) Des Stabb (56.00)	0
(Wales) Tony Ridler (86.49)	1
(Wales) Alan Evans (91.88)	2

Final; Best of 3 legs
(Republic of Ireland) Tommy O'Regan (79.11)	2
(Wales) Alan Evans (69.15)	0

Alan Evans, in his semi-final match against Tony Ridler became the first ever male player to score a 180 on Television. In the same game, Ridler also scored a 180 in the second leg.

The current News of the World Darts Championship winner Ivor Hodgkinson entered the tournament but was beaten in the first round by Frank Crolla.

The tournament featured several internationally capped darts players. Winner O'Regan played for both England and Ireland before becoming captain of Ireland. Willie Etherington, Ron Church and Des Stabb represented England, Bob Whyte represented Scotland,Alan Evans and Tony Ridler played for Wales and George Foster & John Kelly represented Australia.

== 1974 Indoor League Men's Darts Championship Results ==
1st round Best of 3 legs
(England) Des Stabb	0
(Wales) Leighton Rees	2
(Scotland) Tom Brown	2
(England) Alan Glazier	1
(Sweden) Stefan Lord	2
(Republic of Ireland) Pat Mullings	0
(Isle of Man) John Craine	1
(England) Ivor Hodgkinson	2
(England) Joe Matthews	0
(England) Willie Etherington	2
(England) Frank Brown	1
(Wales) Alan Evans	2
(England) Peter Chapman	2
(South Africa) Steve Rollings	0
(Republic of Ireland) Tommy O'Regan	2
(England) Doug Priestner	1

Quarter-finals; Best of 3 legs
(Wales) Leighton Rees	2
(Scotland) Tom Brown	0
(Sweden) Stefan Lord	0
(England) Ivor Hodgkinson	2
(England) Willie Etherington (67.97)	1
(Wales) Alan Evans (67.52)	2
(England) Peter Chapman	0
(Republic of Ireland) Tommy O'Regan	2

Semi-finals; Best of 3 legs
(Wales) Leighton Rees	2
(England) Ivor Hodgkinson	0
(Wales) Alan Evans	2
(Republic of Ireland) Tommy O'Regan	1

Final; Best of 3 legs
(Wales) Leighton Rees	2
(Wales) Alan Evans	1

Doug Priestner, hit a 180 with his first three darts in the competition. He played with John Craine represented of Isle of Man and Steve Rollings represented of South Africa.

== 1975 Indoor League Men's Darts Championship Results ==
1st round Best of 3 legs
(United States) Conrad Daniels	2
(Wales) Tony Ridler	0
(England) Peter Hobson	2
(England) Doug Priestner	0
(Wales) Leighton Rees	2
(England) Dave 'Charlie' White	1
(Wales) Phil Obbard	2
(Australia) George Foster	0
(England) Cliff Inglis	2
(England) Willie Etherington	1
(Scotland) Harry Heenan	2
(Belgium) Andre DeClerqe	0
(Wales) Alan Evans	1
(England) Alan Glazier	2
(Republic of Ireland) Tommy O'Regan	0
(England) Peter Chapman	2

Quarter-finals; Best of 3 legs
(United States) Conrad Daniels	2
(England) Peter Hobson	1
(Wales) Leighton Rees	0
(Wales) Phil Obbard	2
(England) Cliff Inglis	2
(Scotland) Harry Heenan	1
(England) Alan Glazier	2
(England) Peter Chapman	0

Semi-finals; Best of 5 legs
(United States) Conrad Daniels	3
(Wales) Phil Obbard	2
(England) Cliff Inglis	3
(England) Alan Glazier	1

Final; Best of 5 legs
(United States) Conrad Daniels	3
(England) Cliff Inglis	1

For the second year running Doug Priestner, hit a 180 with his first three darts in the competition. Cliff Inglis, hit back-to-back 180s in one of his matches.

== 1976 Indoor League Men's Darts World Championship Results ==
1st round Best of 3 legs
(England) Charlie Ellix	2
(Scotland) Willie Scott	0
(England) John Lowe	2
(England) Peter Chapman	1
(Sweden) Stefan Lord	2
(England) Ken Brown	1
(England) Eric Bristow	2
(England) Alan Glazier	1
(Wales) Leighton Rees	2
(Wales) Phil Obbard	0
(England) Cliff Lazarenko	2
(England) Brian Vaux	0
(United States) Conrad Daniels	2
(England) John Stanton	0
(England) Bill Lennard	1
(England) Cyril Hayes	2

Quarter-finals; Best of 3 legs
(England) Charlie Ellix	2
(England) John Lowe	1
(Sweden) Stefan Lord	1
(England) Eric Bristow	2
(Wales) Leighton Rees	2
(England) Cliff Lazarenko	0
(United States) Conrad Daniels	2
(England) Cyril Hayes	0

Semi-finals; Best of 5 legs
(England) Charlie Ellix	3
(England) Eric Bristow	2
(Wales) Leighton Rees	3
(United States) Conrad Daniels	2

Final; Best of 5 legs
(England) Charlie Ellix	0
(Wales) Leighton Rees	3

In the 1976 Indoor League men's darts World Championship players were redrawn after each round. And the draw above reflects this.

== 1976 Indoor League Ladies Darts World Championship Results ==
1st round Best of 3 legs
(England) Jean Dickinson	2
(England) Susie Robertshaw	0
(England) Pat Piper	2
(England) Pam Langridge	0
(England) Maureen Flowers	2
(England) Cathy Wardell	0
(England) Loveday King	2
(Sweden) Eva Johansson	1
(England) Brenda Simpson	2
(Wales) Ceiwen Potter	1
(Wales) Sandra Gibb	2
(England) Molly Gregory	0
(Wales) Betty Hughes	2
(England) Sharon Brown	0
(England) Babs Evans	0
(England) Margaret Lally	2

Quarter-finals; Best of 3 legs
(England) Jean Dickinson	2
(England) Pat Piper	0
(England) Maureen Flowers	2
(England) Loveday King	1
(England) Brenda Simpson	0
(Wales) Sandra Gibb	2
(Wales) Betty Hughes	0
(England) Margaret Lally	2

Semi-finals; Best of 3 legs
(England) Jean Dickinson	2
(England) Maureen Flowers	1
(Wales) Sandra Gibb	0
(England) Margaret Lally	2

Final; Best of 3 legs
(England) Jean Dickinson	2
(England) Margaret Lally	0

== 1977 Indoor League Men's Darts World Championship Results ==
1st round Best of 3 legs
(England) Alan Glazier	2
(England) Eric Bristow	0
(Wales) Alan Evans	1
(Wales) David "Rocky" Jones	2
(England) Cliff Lazarenko	2
(Scotland) Rab Smith	0
(England) John Lowe	2
(England) Doug McCarthy	0
(England) Charlie Ellix	0
(England) Bill Lennard	2
(England) Cyril Hayes	2
(Sweden) Stefan Lord	0
(Wales) Phil Obbard	0
(Australia) Kevin White	2
(England) Mick Norris	1
(England) Tony Brown	2

Quarter-finals; Best of 3 legs
(England) Alan Glazier	1
(Wales) David "Rocky" Jones	2
(England) Cliff Lazarenko	1
(England) John Lowe	2
(England) Bill Lennard	1
(England) Cyril Hayes	2
(Australia) Kevin White	1
(England) Tony Brown	2

Semi-finals; Best of 5 legs
(Wales) David "Rocky" Jones	3
(England) John Lowe	2
(England) Cyril Hayes	2
(England) Tony Brown	3

Final; Best of 5 legs
(Wales) David "Rocky" Jones	2
(England) Tony Brown	3

Reigning champion Leighton Rees was unavailable at the time of filming the competition due to him touring Australasia doing dart exhibitions. In the 1977 Indoor League men's darts World Championship players were redrawn after each round. And the draw above reflects this.

== 1977 Indoor League Mixed Pairs Darts World Championship Results ==
Semi-finals; Best of 5 legs
1	(Australia) Kevin White & (England) Lynn Stewart	3
4	(England) Bob Crosland & (England) Margaret Lally	2
3	(England) Ken Brown & (Wales) Sandra Gibb	3
2	(England) Peter Chapman & (England) Brenda Simpson	2

Final; Best of 5 legs
(Australia) Kevin White & (England) Lynn Stewart	1
(England) Ken Brown & (Wales) Sandra Gibb	3

During the second semi-final, Peter Chapman become the first player to hit a televised 180 in a mixed pairs game, and Sandra Gibb scored the first ever televised 180 scored by a female player.

The semi-finals and final in this mixed pairs competition were the best of five legs of 701.
