= 1982 British Professional Championship =

Darts tournament

British Professional Championship

Tournament information
- Venue: Gaskins Conference Centre
- Location: Middlesbrough
- Country: England
- Organisation(s): BDO
- Format: Sets
- Prize fund: £26,000
- Month(s) Played: September

The 1982 British Professional Championship was a major darts tournament on the BDO/WDF calendar for 1982. It took place in late September at the Gaskins Conference Centre, Middlesbrough. It was broadcast on BBC Television.

The tournament featured 32 of the best players from around the world.

== Prize money ==
Total Prize fund was £26,000

- Champion £7,000
- Runner-up £3,500

== Results ==
First round (best of 5 sets)
(England) John Lowe	3
(Wales) Alan Plant	0
(Wales) Tony Ridler	3
(England) Joe Dodd	0
(England) Dave Whitcombe	3
(England) Tony Brown	1
(England) Neil Harvey	3
(England) Steve Fielding	1
(Northern Ireland) Steve Brennan	3
(England) Ritchie Gardner	0
(Wales) Alan Evans	3
(England) Eric Parkinson	2
(England) Barrie Done	3
(England) Kevin Kenny	2
(England) Peter Masson	3
(Wales) Ceri Morgan	1
(England) Cliff Lazarenko	3
(Wales) Byron Wozencraft	0
(England) Dave Lee	3
(England) Paul Gosling	1
(England) Bobby George	3
(Scotland) Harry Patterson	2
(England) Alan Glazier	3
(Wales) Dyfri Jones	2
(Wales) Tony Skuse	3
(England) Tim Gould	2
(England) Les Capewell	3
(Wales) John Corfe	0
(England) Stuart Holden	3
(Scotland) Rab Smith	2
(England) Eric Bristow	3
(Wales) Leighton Rees	1

Second round (best of 7 sets)
(England) John Lowe	4
(Wales) Tony Ridler	2
(England) Dave Whitcombe	4
(England) Neil Harvey	1
(Northern Ireland) Steve Brennan	4
(Wales) Alan Evans	1
(England) Barrie Done	3
(England) Peter Masson	4
(England) Cliff Lazarenko	4
(England) Dave Lee	2
(England) Bobby George	3
(England) Alan Glazier	4
(Wales) Tony Skuse	4
(England) Les Capewell	3
(England) Stuart Holden	1
(England) Eric Bristow	4

Quarter-finals (best of 9 sets)
(England) John Lowe	5
(England) Dave Whitcombe	0
(Northern Ireland) Steve Brennan	5
(England) Peter Masson	3
(England) Cliff Lazarenko	4
(England) Alan Glazier	5
(Wales) Tony Skuse	0
(England) Eric Bristow	5

Semi-finals (best of 11 sets)
(England) John Lowe	6
(Northern Ireland) Steve Brennan	2
(England) Alan Glazier	1
(England) Eric Bristow	6

Final (best of 13 sets)
(England) John Lowe	3
(England) Eric Bristow	7
