= British Pentathlon =

Professional darts tournament

Tournament information
- Venue: Various
- Country: England
- Established: 1975
- Organisation(s): BDO (until 2020), WDF, unranked

Current champion(s)
- (England) Connor Scutt

The British Pentathlon is a professional darts event consisting of five different disciplines. It was first established in 1975, run by the British Darts Organisation and subsequently the World Darts Federation. A women's event was established in 2004.

The event is invitational and has twenty competitors. Martin Adams has won it 13 times and John Lowe won it ten times. The women's event has been won eight times by Trina Gulliver. Other multiple winners include Eric Bristow, Phil Taylor, John Walton and Andy Fordham.

== Format ==
The Pentathlon has a unique format among darts events. Competitors play 24 games of darts over the course of the day: a two-legged 501 match against each of the other players (a total of 19 matches), single legs from 1001 and 2001, then games of halve-it, Shanghai and round the board on doubles. Points are awarded based on performances in each of the events. The champion is the player who accumulates the highest number of points.

The Pentathlon has been described as "the toughest and most gruelling darts event on the calendar," whose aim is "to reduce luck to a minimum and ensure that talent, skill and determination are rewarded with success." Trina Gulliver called it "probably the most difficult darts competition ever." Bobby George described it as "like darts' version of Superstars without any cycling, shooting or swimming." He also thought it a "ridiculous event", which "had no appeal to me whatsoever", and "one long, hard, boring slog". John Lowe, on the other hand, enjoyed the event, but eventually stopped playing in it because the prizemoney hadn't increased in years.

== Gameplay ==
The exact rules can vary across events. In the British pentathlon, the rules are as follows:

- Each invited player plays each other over two legs from the standard 501 start. Points are awarded for high scoring visits, for completing the leg within a set number of darts, and for winning the leg.
- Each player plays a single leg of darts starting from both 1001 and 2001. Points are awarded for high scoring visits and there are bonus points for completing the leg within a set number of darts.
- Shanghai - The player throws three darts at each segment from 1 through 9. One point is awarded for hitting the correct single number, two for the double and three for the treble. Bonus points are awarded for hitting one single, one double and one treble of the target number ("Shanghai").
- Halve it - Players have three darts at each of the designated numbers in turn: 20s, 16s, double 7, 14s, treble 10, 17s, bullseye. Scoring is standard, but as the game progresses, missing a target number results in the player's score being halved. For pentathlon points, players are awarded one point for hitting each correct single, two for a double, three for a treble and two for a bullseye.
- Round the board on doubles - Players have 42 darts to hit every double on the board starting on 1 and continuing sequentially until 20. Two points are awarded for each double hit and bonus points are awarded for completing the challenge with darts to spare.

== British Pentathlon winners ==
=== Men ===
Year	1st place	2nd place	Round the board on doubles	Shanghai	Halve-it
2021	Neil Duff	Luke Littler	Neil Duff	Neil Duff	Dean Winstanley/James Richardson
2020	Not held due to COVID-19 pandemic				
2019	Martin Adams	Kyle McKinstry	Dave Parletti	Jim Withers/Keith Montgomery	Martin Adams
2018	Kyle McKinstry	Andy Baetens	Sven Verdonck	Dave Parletti	Jim McEwan
2017	Martin Adams	Willem Mandigers	Jay Foreman	Andy Baetens	Paul Dawkins
2016	Martin Adams	Jamie Hughes	Jamie Hughes	Ted Hankey	Tatu Pehkonen
2015	Jamie Hughes	John Walton	John Walton	Jamie Hughes	Jamie Hughes
2014	Martin Adams	John Walton	Pip Blackwell/Sven Verdonck	John Walton	Garry Thompson
2013	James Hurrell	Jay Foreman/Paul Dawkins	Rune David/Joe Lacey	Jay Foreman/Dirk Hespeels	Jay Foreman
2012	Robert Wagner	Martin Adams	Martin Adams/Steve Douglas/James Hurrell/Jim Withers	Paul Snowsill	Jani Haavisto/Joe Lacey
2011	Martin Adams	Dean Winstanley	Dirk Hespeels	Martin Adams	Danny Russell
2010	John Walton	Martin Adams	John Walton	John Walton	Pip Blackwell
2009	Martin Adams	Scott Mitchell	Martin Adams	Martin Adams	Scott Mitchell
2008	Martin Adams	John Walton	Marko Kantele	Martin Adams	Ross Smith
2007	Co Stompe	Marko Kantele	Phil Wanstall	Dirk Hespeels/Co Stompe	Paul Dawkins
2006	John Walton	Tony Eccles	Robert Wagner	Tony Eccles/John Walton	Jim Withers
2005	Tony Eccles	Ulf Ceder	Pascal Rabau	Pascal Rabau	Ulf Ceder
2004	Martin Adams	Ted Hankey	Marko Kantele	Martin Adams	Phill Nixon
2003	Andy Fordham	Ted Hankey	Martin Adams/Andy Fordham	Jarkko Komula	Vijay Kumar
2002	John Walton	Martin Adams	Martin Adams/Robert Wagner	Andy Fordham	Chris Bowring
2001	Martin Adams	Ronnie Baxter	Jarkko Komula	Colin Monk/Phill Nixon	Martin Adams
2000	Martin Adams	Peter Manley	Ronnie Baxter	Martin Adams	Ronnie Baxter
1999	Martin Adams	Colin Monk	John Walton	Martin Adams	John Walton
1998	Andy Fordham	Ronnie Baxter	Colin Monk	Andy Fordham	Ronnie Baxter
1997	Ronnie Baxter	Mervyn King	Martin Adams	Ronnie Baxter	Andy Fordham
1996	Martin Adams	Ronnie Baxter	Andy Jenkins	Thor Johansen	Colin Monk
1995	Richie Burnett	Steve Beaton	Richie Burnett	Richie Burnett	Martin Adams
1994	Martin Adams	Les Wallace	Steve Beaton	Andy Fordham	Colin Monk
1993	Steve Beaton	Andy Fordham	Steve Beaton	Kevin Painter	Steve Beaton
1992	Dennis Priestley	Alan Warriner	Dennis Priestley	Andy Fordham	Rod Harrington
1991	Phil Taylor	Ronnie Baxter	Peter Evison	Phil Taylor	Ritchie Gardner
1990	Phil Taylor	Alan Warriner	Paul Reynolds	Alan Warriner	Ronnie Baxter
1989	Eric Bristow	Bob Sinnaeve	Eric Bristow/Martin Hurley	Eric Bristow	Shayne Burgess
1988	Alan Warriner	John Lowe	Alan Warriner	Eric Bristow/Reg Harding/Alan Warriner	John Lowe
1987	John Lowe	Ritchie Gardner	Paul Lim/Gene Raymond	Graham Scowcroft	Don Dillon
1986	John Lowe	Robert MacKenzie	John Lowe	Robert MacKenzie	John Lowe
1985	John Lowe	Ritchie Gardner	John Lowe	Tony Littlewood	John Lowe
1984	John Lowe	Jocky Wilson	Ken Summers	Steve Brennan/John Lowe	Ritchie Gardner
1983	John Lowe	Keith Deller	Steve Brennan/Alan Glazier	Alan Glazier/John Lowe	Trevor Nurse
1982	John Lowe	Jocky Wilson	Brian Langworth	Steve Brennan	John Lowe
1981	Eric Bristow	John Lowe	Cliff Lazarenko	John Lowe	Eric Bristow
1980	John Lowe	Eric Bristow	Brian Langworth	Brian Langworth	Dave Whitcombe
1979	John Lowe	Eric Bristow	Bobby George/Cliff Lazarenko	Eric Bristow	Mick Banyard
1978	John Lowe	Dave Whitcombe	Cliff Lazarenko	Dave Whitcombe	John Lowe
1977	Rab Smith	Alan Glazier	George Simmons	Alan Glazier	Ken Brown
1976	John Lowe	Leighton Rees	George Simmons	Cliff Lazarenko	Leighton Rees
1975	Conrad Daniels	Cliff Inglis	Harry Heenan/Phil Obbard/Tommy O'Regan/Noel Fowley/Phil Wakeman/Steve Rollings	George Foster/Kevin White/Jim McQuillan/Jack McKenna/Cyril Hayes/Boerge Madsen	George Cottle/Javier Gopar/John Kelly/Glyn Greenway/Douglas Melander/Bjørn Enqvist/John Riding

=== Women ===
Year	1st place	2nd place	Round the board on doubles	Shanghai	Halve-it
2021	Not held				
2020	Not held due to COVID-19 pandemic				
2019	Beau Greaves	Laura Turner	Laura Stockings	Laura Turner	Vicky Pruim
2018	Aileen de Graaf	Lorraine Winstanley	Deta Hedman/Sharon Prins	Casey Gallagher	Lorraine Winstanley
2017	Deta Hedman	Lorraine Winstanley	Rachna David	Anca Zijlstra	Lorraine Winstanley
2016	Trina Gulliver	Deta Hedman	Claire Brookin	Sarah Roberts	Rhian Griffiths
2015	Fallon Sherrock	Lorraine Winstanley/Deta Hedman	Deta Hedman	Fallon Sherrock	Claire Brookin
2014	Deta Hedman	Claire Brookin	Elin Assestrand	Trina Gulliver	Wendy Reinstadtler
2013	Deta Hedman	Trina Gulliver	Deta Hedman	Trina Gulliver	Donna Rainsley
2012	Trina Gulliver	Rachna David	Trina Gulliver/Donna Rainsley	Anna Forsmark	Anna Forsmark
2011	Trina Gulliver	Zoe Jones	Marlene Badger	Zoe Jones	Lorraine Winstanley
2010	Deta Hedman	Lorraine Winstanley	Deta Hedman/Sue Gulliver/Tricia Wright	Deta Hedman	Sue Gulliver
2009	Trina Gulliver	Apylee Jones	Donna Rainsley	Karen Lawman	Viv Dundon
2008	Lisa Ashton	Trina Gulliver	Lisa Ashton	Lisa Ashton	Lisa Ashton
2007	Trina Gulliver	Julie Gore	Irina Armstrong	Julie Gore	Sandra Pollett
2006	Trina Gulliver	Karen Lawman	Karen Lawman	Karen Lawman	Trina Gulliver
2005	Trina Gulliver	Apylee Jones	Inita Bite/Tricia Wright	Hege Lokken	Trina Gulliver
2004	Trina Gulliver	Karen Lawman	Karen Lawman	Trina Gulliver	Trina Gulliver
