= Tommy O'Regan =

Irish darts player

Personal information
- Full name: Thomas O'Regan
- Nickname: Bullseye Kid/The Great Regan
- Born: 28 February 1939
- Died: October 8, 2000 (aged 60–61) Kilmallock, Ireland

Sport
- Sport: Darts
- Playing since: 1969
- Darts: 28 Gram
- Laterality: Right-handed
- Walk-on music: "The Wild Rover" by Luke Kelly

Organisation (see split in darts)
- BDO: 1973–1979

WDF major events – best performances
- World Masters: Quarter-finals: 1976

Other tournament wins
- Tournament: Years
- NDAGB England and Wales National Champion Indoor League (televised) Denmark Open Walthamstow Individuals Klondyke Open Palm Springs Open (USA) Limerick Open: 1970, 1971, 1972 1973; 1973; 1974; 1976; 1976; 1978

Thomas "Tommy" O'Regan (28 February 1939 - 8 October 2000) was a professional Irish darts player who captained both the Ireland and England darts teams. From Limerick in the south west of Ireland, he was one of the pioneers of the modern era of darts.

He was the first captain of an England team in the Home International tournament series. He mixed with the greats of the game in the early years of the modern era - Eric Bristow, John Lowe, Bobby George - and while his career came to an end before televised darts became the norm, many of the first superstars cite him as an influence.

== Darts career ==
A former jockey, he played much of his darts in England, noted by Darts World magazine in 1972 as "a genial milk roundsman", playing in the Walthamstow and District Darts League. In his book, Bobby George cites Tommy's local pub was "the Swan". He played for Southgate, Hornsey and Beech Hill Park in the London Superleague. He represented London in the British Inter Counties Championship, including as its captain in the inaugural season under the newly formed BDO, winning 14 of 28 games (11 wins out of 22 for London A and 4 wins out of 5 for London B). Prior to the formation of the BDO, he had played for the Greater London Darts Team, playing 12 games and winning 10. His time with London also coincided with a golden era of visiting international squads for challenge matches, including representative games with the United States and Sweden. He won the 1968 London Superleague pairs with Jim McNally and singles in 1970. He won London Superleague titles with Southgate (1971-1972 and 1972–1973) and Hornsey (1974-1975). His intercounty career came to an end in 1978 with a game against Cambridgeshire. He subsequeerly competed extensively in the United States.

O'Regan won the National Darts Association of Great Britain national championships in 3 successive years, from 1970 to 1972, a tournament played in 801 format. He was awarded a replica of the tournament's trophy to recognise the extraordinary feat. Following his third win, he was invited to appear on the 1972 Christmas edition of the television show Record Breakers alongside Tom Barrett and Bill Duddy. Each attempted to break the record for "around the board in doubles" with O'Regan getting the furthest, reaching 14 within 2 minutes and 13 seconds (the existing record for the full board).

He won the Indoor League in 1973, beating Alan Evans in the televised final and winning £150. Evans was the hot favourite after an electrifying semi-final win over Welsh countryman Tony Ridler. O'Regan's winning legs in the final at the Leeds Irish Club were 18 and 21 darts for an average of 79.11, which would have been higher but for some missed doubles in the final leg. Having left 61 after 12 darts, he ended up finished on double 2 from a seemingly impossible angle. He was one of three players brought from London by Olly Croft to challenge the predominantly Yorkshire based champions. In his book "Bellies and Bullseyes", Sid Waddell recounts that before the tournament, Croft confidently declared that O'Regan would win the tournament. In the 1974 edition he was beaten in the semi-final by Alan Evans.

Success overseas is a prominent part of his darting success. He won the 1973 Denmark Open, beating Australia's George Foster in the final. He went on to also win the 1976 Klondike Open beating Canada's Jack Irvine in the final. He reached the semi-final of the US Open in 1984, also reaching the semi-final of the mixed triples (with Charlotte Haluska and Steve Baker) and the final of the 4-a-side (with Steve Baker, Dennis Hassett and David Miller) at the same tournament.

With his most successful period coming just before the launch of the modern major tournaments, his appearance in the 1976 World Masters stands alone as his contribution to these events. He reached the quarter-final of the World Masters that year, beaten by eventual winner John Lowe of England, by a score of 3–2. Third place at the 1979 British Open Pairs appears his last recorded darts honour in the UK, playing with Gary Laurence.

His achievements in the 1980s were in the United States, where he was based out of Salem, Massachusetts. At the 1980 Golden Gate Dart Classic he reached the final of the mixed triples with Judy Campbell and Jack Radigan, being beaten only by Eric Bristow, Maureen Flowers and Leighton Rees. He won the blind draw doubles tournament with Don Bond, beating Bristow in the final. He reached the last 32 of the Doubles tournament at the 1984 Windy City Open.

One of the first players to use tungsten darts, he was one of the first to have sets of darts marketed using his name. He has been noted as one of the founders of the darts exhibition circuit, travelling around the UK and North America playing the best local players and demonstrating trickshots.

== International caps ==
O'Regan had the distinction of captaining both the Republic of Ireland and England darts teams, a feat never repeated.

His official record on England caps is 3 wins out of 3 appearances. Though this does not include more informal international events held in the mid-1970s. Bobby George notes in his autobiography that O'Regan was chosen to captain the first ever English team in a recognised international game in 1973. He also captained the victorious England team in the 1973 Home Internationals. In the following year, with the foundation of the BDO and the Inter County system, O'Regan returned to playing for his country of birth. In 1976 he captained a "Rest of Great Britain" team against Wales in a friendly international. In the 1976 Home Internationals he represented Ireland in Dundee, playing in the games against Scotland and Wales, scoring one of 10 180s on the day.
