= Loveday King =

English darts player (1935–2025)

Personal information
- Full name: Loveday Carter King
- Born: 8 September 1935 Lanivet, England
- Died: 30 June 2025 (aged 89) Wadebridge, England
- Home town: Lower Woodley, England

Sport
- Sport: Darts
- Playing since: 1952
- Darts: 26g
- Laterality: Right-handed

Organisation (see split in darts)
- BDO: 1974–1984

WDF major events – best performances
- World Masters: Last 32, 1984

Other tournament wins
- Tournament: Years
- Indoor League BDO Gold Cup: 1973; 1981

Loveday King (née Carter; 8 September 1935 – 30 June 2025) was an English professional darts player.

== Personal life ==
King was born Loveday Carter to parents John and Vivienne. She married Tommy King, and they had two daughters, Patricia and Lorraine, and one son named Mark.

King died at home in Wadebridge, Cornwall, on 30 June 2025.

== Career ==
King won the inaugural Indoor League ladies' Darts championship in 1973, defeating Brenda Simpson 2–1 in the semi finals and Jessie Catterick 2–0 in the final. This was the first ever televised women's darts tournament. Later, she continued to play county darts for Cornwall from 1974 until 1990.

King went on to win the BDO Gold Cup in 1981, defeating Jean Smith 3–2 in the final, having beaten tournament favourite Maureen Flowers en route. She also played in the World Masters in the early 1980s, before losing to New Zealand's Jane Karena in the last 32.

In a career retrospective written during her lifetime, Dr. Patrick Chaplin called King "the first superstar of ladies' darts"
