= Colin Minton =

English darts player

Personal information
- Born: 2 October 1945 Easingwold, North Yorkshire, England
- Died: 12 December 1998 (aged 53) Bradford, England
- Home town: Mexborough, South Yorkshire, England

Sport
- Sport: Darts
- Playing since: 1965
- Laterality: Right-handed

Organisation (see split in darts)
- BDO: 1976–1990

Other tournament wins
- Tournament: Years
- The Indoor League: 1972
- Updated on 2 October 2018

Colin Minton (2 October 1945 – 12 December 1998) was an English professional darts player who competed in the British Darts Organisation in the 1970s, 1980s and 1990s.

Minton was best known for winning the first series of The Indoor League, the TV show that kickstarted the live showing of darts on TV. Minton was invited to the show as a largely unknown darts player as the first series only had players from the Yorkshire region and matches were played on the no trebles Yorkshire dart board. He beat Gerry Haywood, a well known darts player who went on to play in world championships, 2–1 in the semi-final before beating Charles Ellis of Bradford 2–0 in the final winning the £100 grand prize.

Minton was invited back for the second season of the Indoor league but with the field extended to the whole of the UK he lost in the quarter-final to Welsh international Tony Ridler.

Despite winning the first Indoor league tournament Minton never went on to play high level darts during the first peak of the late 1970s and 80s but continued to play locally in the Yorkshire area and won many local league trophies.

Minton died on 12 December 1998.
