= Sid Waddell =

British darts commentator (1940–2012)

- Waddell in 2007
- Born: Sidney Waddell; 10 August 1940; Alnwick, England
- Died: 11 August 2012 (aged 72); Harrogate, England
- Education: The King Edward VI School, Morpeth; St John's College, Cambridge
- Occupations: Sports commentator, television presenter
- Years active: 1972–2012
- Known for: Darts commentary, one-liners
- Children: 5

Sidney Waddell (10 August 1940 – 11 August 2012) was an English sports commentator and television personality. He was nicknamed the Voice of Darts due to his fame as a darts commentator, and worked for Granada, Yorkshire, BBC and Sky Sports. Due to his joke-telling skills he was also nicknamed the Thief of Bad Gags, firstly by Dave Lanning. He was nominated for two awards for his work, and published several books.

== Early life ==
The son of a Northumberland miner, he attended King Edward VI Grammar School, Morpeth, and went on to obtain a scholarship to St John's College, Cambridge, where he graduated with an upper second degree in Modern History. At Cambridge, Waddell played rugby for St John's, and the Cambridge University LX Club, the rugby second team. Injury brought him to darts and he started the inter-college darts competition. St John's lost in the final of this in 1961 to a team of trainee vicars from Selwyn College.

== Career ==
=== Granada and Yorkshire ===
Waddell went into academia for a few years beginning in 1962. He joined the Social Studies Department at Durham University and assisted the Professors of Politics and Economics in writing their books. He toyed with the idea of writing a book on trade unions but settled for folk singing in a duo with Charles E. Hall called the Gravyboatmen. They played on BBC Tonight and ITV locally. In 1966, Waddell joined Granada Television working with Michael Parkinson on local news programmes. In 1968, he moved to Yorkshire Television. Between 1968 and 1974, Waddell was a producer for over 600 editions of the local news programme, Calendar. He also devised the ITV network children's series The Flaxton Boys, a historical adventure series that ran for three years from 1969.

1972 was a big year for darts as ITV broadcast the News of the World Darts Championship for the first time. Waddell was an observer at Alexandra Palace during the 1972 News of the World Championship and was particularly impressed with the play and character of the eventual finalist, Welshman Alan Evans, who beat reigning champion Dennis Filkins in the semi-finals with a fiery display. Also in 1972, Waddell created the show The Indoor League, which featured various pub games including darts, pool, bar billiards, bar skittles, Table football (aka foosball), arm wrestling and shove ha'penny. The Indoor League was only shown on Yorkshire Television in 1972 but went national on the ITV network from 1973 to 1977, although Waddell had left ITV by the last series of the programme.

=== BBC ===
In 1976, Waddell switched to the BBC and his experience with televised darts helped him to become one of the commentators on the first World Professional Darts Championship when it began in 1978. Waddell stayed with the BBC until 1994, commentating on all darts events covered by the BBC, with his last darts commentary on the BBC being the first four sets of the 1994 BDO World Championship Final between John Part and Bobby George.

During his time with the BBC, Waddell penned ten episodes of a successful children's television series, Jossy's Giants in 1986. He was also the writer of two series of another children's show Sloggers which ran from 1994 to 1996. He was also a director for Mop and Smiff and assistant producer for the follow-up series Mike, Mop and the Moke. His credits also include working with the eccentric scientist Magnus Pyke and he was Alan Whicker's producer on Whicker's Women in 1972. He worked on the Russell Harty Show, and in 1993 did a series for Tyne Tees Television called Waddell's World in which he was a butler to a posh Tweeddale family, a caravanner and on the dole.

He made one performance as the "Voice of the Balls" on the National Lottery Red Alert on BBC in 1999. He said he was sacked for being "too Geordie".

=== Sky Sports ===
From 1994, Waddell became an independently employed commentator, but was mainly associated with his work for Sky Sports. The first darts tournament he commentated on for Sky Sports was the 1994 World Matchplay at the Winter Gardens, Blackpool, in August 1994. For the next 17 years, he worked continuously as a commentator on all darts tournaments televised by Sky Sports. In September 2011, Waddell was diagnosed with bowel cancer. Despite this diagnosis and undergoing treatment, he managed to come back to the darts commentary box in the spring of 2012 during some Premier League nights.

After commentating on a sporadic basis during the 2012 Premier League, Waddell did not commentate at either the 2012 UK Open nor the 2012 World Matchplay prior to his death on 11 August 2012. Waddell's last darts commentary came in the 2012 Premier League final between Phil Taylor and Simon Whitlock on 17 May, where Phil Taylor won the match 10-7 to take the title, although Waddell only commentated on the first part of the match; his last commentary contributing to a full match came in the same evening in the semi-final match between Phil Taylor and James Wade, Taylor won the match 8–6.

Waddell's last interview came in June 2012, where he discussed his life, darts commentary, pool commentary and his bowel cancer. This interview was aired on Sky Sports on 16 August 2012, five days after his death, as a tribute entitled: Sid Waddell – A Life in His Own Words.

=== Pool commentary and other works ===
Besides darts, Waddell commentated on numerous other sporting events produced by Sky Sports and/or Matchroom Sport over the years. He regularly commentated on the four annual nine-ball pool events on which the two companies collaborated (World Pool Championship; World Pool Masters; World Pool League; and Mosconi Cup), particularly between the years of 1999–2003. However, as these events began to be hosted further away from the UK, Waddell gradually withdrew from the sport. He is remembered for coining the term "Golden Break", meaning when the 9-ball is pocketed directly from the break, giving the breaking player an immediate win.

In 2004, Waddell was the commentator for the British game show House of Games in which two families competed in various household-based challenges.

In 2006, Waddell began to host Sid Waddell's Wrestling Show on ESPN Classic. This show featured edited versions of matches from the days of World of Sport Wrestling.

In 2007, Waddell and Eric Bristow recorded a series of Bellies and Bullseyes darts programmes about the World Darts Championship from 1978 until 1990 for ESPN Classic, which were later broadcast on the channel in December 2007.

=== Awards ===
Waddell was twice nominated for TV awards. He was up for BAFTA best director in 1992 for a documentary in the Ipso Facto series, and in 1994 he was nominated for best scriptwriter in the Writers' Guild of Great Britain awards for his children's cricket series Sloggers.

== Publications ==
He wrote eleven published books, including biographies of John Lowe, Jocky Wilson and Phil Taylor. His book Bellies and Bullseyes was short listed for the British Sports Book Award for 2008.

His racy 1973 novel Bedroll Bella, about a Geordie groupie, was banned by WH Smith and John Menzies. In 2009 he published a memoir of his boyhood in a Geordie pit village, The Road Back Home.

== Personal life ==
Waddell was married to Irene. Waddell was a fervent Newcastle United supporter, and lived in Pudsey. In September 2011, it was announced that Waddell had been diagnosed with bowel cancer.

Waddell died of bowel cancer on 11 August 2012, the day after his 72nd birthday, in Harrogate, North Yorkshire. Following his death, the decision was made to rename the PDC World Darts Championship trophy the Sid Waddell trophy from 2013. Waddell's funeral was held in Leeds on 22 August 2012. Before Waddell's funeral he was cremated earlier in the day in a private ceremony.

== Quotes ==
External videos
- Quotes from Sid Waddell

- "Even Hypotenuse would have trouble working out these angles!"
- "He's as happy as a penguin in a microwave."
- "He's burning the midnight oil at both ends!"
- "He's moving round that pool table like Shawn Michaels after a couple of body slams."
- "He's standing on the oche with about as much composure as a frog in a blender."
- "His eyes are bulging like the belly of a hungry chaffinch."
- "It's like trying to pin down a kangaroo on a trampoline."
- "It's the greatest comeback since Lazarus!"
- "In the space of three darts, he has gone from being Lee Van Cleef to the Laughing Cavalier."
- "Jocky Wilson; what an athlete!"
- "Once upon a time, he was breaking all records; now, he's only breaking his hearts. Nothing you can do, Total Eclipse of the Dart."
- "Put your granny in a roomy. Send your daddy to the steamy. Get some biscuits and a droppy. This darts match will make 'ya ... happy!" (2011 PDC World Darts Championship Final)
- "That could have landed on the pupil of a fly's eyeball"
- "The atmosphere is so tense, if Elvis walked in with a portion of chips, you could hear the vinegar sizzle on them"
- "There's only one word for that – magic darts!"
- "There's only one word to describe the atmosphere here tonight – too much."
- "They'll be rattling their clogs in Cleckheaton!"
- "We've had the Old Testament, the New Testament; we've done Chaucer and Shakespeare. How about the Apocrypha?"
- "When Alexander of Macedonia was 33, he cried salt tears because there were no more worlds to conquer... Bristow's only 27."
- "William Tell could take an apple off your head, Taylor could take out a processed pea."
- "Well, that's the definition of genius: an infinite capacity for making other people feel the pain. He's got that, has Strickland."
- "[Jamie Harvey] spinning along like an ancient Tartan-painted Ford Cortina."
- "[Raymond van Barneveld is] like a marble figure in the Rijksmuseum." (2010 World Matchplay)
- "We've got drama here. Old Vic, New Vic, even the Queen Vic. What an atmosphere!"
- "Peter Manley: no stranger to a Porterhouse steak and all of the trimments."
- "There was less noise when Pompeii was swamped in lava – absolute pandemonium!" (Burgess vs. Manley at the 1999 World Championship)
- Well, I ain't exactly impartial [to] some of the lads here, but if you think they're excited, what are the people in suffix?"
- "[Keith Deller's] mother has been known to do the chips with one hand and throw a dart with the other. She'd throw the chip pan out the window with this!"

=== After tournament wins ===
- "... And he got the shock of his life!" (Phil Taylor wins the 1995 World Championship and gets shocked by a confetti cannon after)
- "John Part of Canada, in the greatest game ever seen by Sky, beats the ten-times world champion!" (2003 World Darts Championship)
- "Thunder! Lightning! The way [Phil Taylor] hits it is frightening!" (1997 World Matchplay)

=== After significant moments ===
- "Annie Oakley couldn't hit this with the best rifle, but The Power ... can!" (Phil Taylor wins the 2008 World Matchplay on a 132 bullseye finish)
- "Dave Lanning, say it, 'cus I'm gobsmacked! Are you godsmacked?! Say it, Dave!" (Phil Taylor hits his second nine-darter in a game against James Wade, 2010 Premier League)
- "I do not believe my Geordie eyes! Barney does a nine-darter on the night there were those who doubted his greatness!" (2006 Premier League)
- "He did one in '03, he did one in '05, he did one in '07, and blow me down Stuart, he's done it again!" (Phil Taylor hits a nine darter at the 2008 UK Open against Jamie Harvey)
