= 1980 WDF Europe Cup =

Tournament information
- Location: Ebbw Vale
- Country: Wales
- Established: 3–4 October
- Organisation(s): WDF
- Format: Legs

Champion(s)
- Singles; Tony Brown (men's singles); Pairs (Sweden) Stefan Lord & Bjørn Enqvist (men's pairs); Team; England (men's team); Overall; England (men's overall)

The 1980 WDF Europe Cup was the 2nd edition of the WDF Europe Cup darts tournament, organised by the World Darts Federation. It was held in Copenhagen, Denmark from October 3 to 4.

== Entered Teams ==
16 national teams entered into the event.

Nr.	Country	Men's Selection
1	Belgium	Luc Marreel, Andre Declerq, Andre Desmit, Lucien Deduytsche
2	Denmark	Jorgen Rasmussen, Kaj Mortensen, Jan Larsen, Kim Jensen
3	England	Eric Bristow, Cliff Lazarenko, John Lowe, Tony Brown
4	France	Jean-Claude Fichot, Phillippe Labernardiere, John Phillips, Peter Robbins
5	Finland	Kexi Heinaharju, Kari Malmberg, Matti Sarkkinen, Kari Saukkonen
6	West Germany	Michael Weidelt, Steven Gatley, Robbin Orridge, Francis Green
7	Gibraltar	Mohamed Bakali, Freddie Duarte, Leslie Ward, John Neale
8	Ireland	John Buckley, Eugene McDermott, Jim McQuillan, Seamus O'Brien
9	Jersey	Joseph Bell, David Elstone, Victor Fiodoruk, Kenny Horton
10	Northern Ireland	Roy Dunlop, Billy Mateer, Anthony McCaugherthy, Dessie Noade
11	Malta	Alexander Bonnici, Domnic Cachia, Lorry Galea, Charles Ghiller
12	Netherlands	Alan Morley, Robin Earp, Jilles Vermaat, Leo de Oude
13	Scotland	Alistair Forrester, Angus Ross, Jocky Wilson, Rab Smith
14	Spain	Jose-Marck Alcaraz, Adrian Buckley, Joan Dalmag-Puig, Salvador Ruiz-Perez
15	Sweden	Stefan Lord, Bjørn Enqvist, Nils-Magnus Ericksson, Becke Johansson
16	Wales	Dyfri Jones, Wayne Lock, Ceri Morgan, Leighton Rees
