= Dry Blackthorn Cider Masters =

Tournament information
- Country: (United Kingdom) Great Britain
- Established: 1983
- Organisation(s): BDO (7 editions)
- Format: Sets
- Final Year: 1989

Final champion(s)
- (England) Bob Anderson

The Dry Blackthorn Cider Masters was a darts tournament organised by the British Darts Organisation that started in 1983 and ended in 1989. The event was televised on ITV until 1988, when ITV dropped coverage of darts.

== List of tournaments ==
Year	Champion	Score	Runner-up	Total Prize Money	Champion	Runner-up
1983	(England) John Lowe	2-0	(England) Eric Bristow	£3,000	?	?
1984	(England) Eric Bristow	3-2	(England) John Lowe	?	?	?
1985	(England) Eric Bristow	3–0	(England) John Lowe	?	?	?
1986	(England) John Lowe	3-2	(England) Cliff Lazarenko	?	?	?
1987	(England) Eric Bristow	3-0	(England) Mike Gregory	?	?	?
1988	(England) Mike Gregory	3-1	(England) Mick Manning	?	?	?
1989	(England) Bob Anderson	beat	(England) John Lowe	?	?	?

== Tournament records ==
- Most wins 3: (England) Eric Bristow.
- Most Finals 5: (England) John Lowe.
- Most Semi Finals 6: (England) Eric Bristow, (England) John Lowe.
- Most Quarter Finals 7: (England) Eric Bristow, (England) John Lowe.
- Most Appearances 7: (England) Eric Bristow, (England) John Lowe.
- Youngest Winner age 26: (England) Eric Bristow.
- Oldest Winner age 41: (England) Bob Anderson.
