= 1983 BDO World Darts Championship =

Tournament information
- Dates: 1–8 January 1983
- Venue: Jollees Cabaret Club
- Location: Stoke-on-Trent
- Country: England
- Organisation(s): BDO
- Format: Sets; Final – best of 11
- Prize fund: £33,050
- Winner's share: £8,000
- High checkout: 161 (Scotland) Jocky Wilson

Champion(s)
- (England) Keith Deller

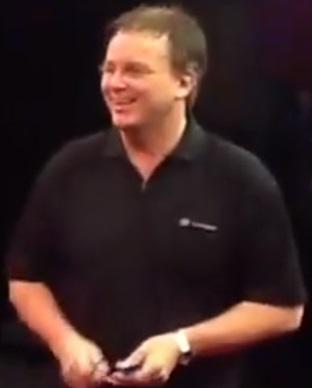
1983 BDO World Darts Champion - Keith Deller

The 1983 BDO World Darts Championship (known for sponsorship reasons as The 1983 Embassy World Darts Championship) was staged at the Jollees Cabaret Club in Stoke-on-Trent from 1–8 January 1983.

The tournament saw one of the World Darts Championship's biggest upsets, when Keith Deller defeated Eric Bristow, by 6 sets to 5 in the final, to become the youngest ever World Darts Champion and the first qualifier to win the World Championship.

Deller also beat world number 3, John Lowe in the quarter-finals and defending champion and world number 2, Jocky Wilson in the semi-finals, making him the only player in history to defeat the world's top three ranked players in the World Championship.

The final featured one of darts' most memorable moments, when Bristow was left on 121. Having hit single 17 and then treble 18, Bristow decided against hitting the bullseye. Instead he hit a single 18 to leave double 16, whilst Deller was on 138. Deller had already missed seven darts at a double to win the title in the ninth set, when leading 5-3 and Bristow believed his opponent would not check out the high finish. However, Deller hit treble 20, followed by treble 18 and finally finished on double 12 to win the title. To this day commentators often refer to 138 as the "Deller checkout" if a player is left with that score.

== Seeds ==
1. (England) Eric Bristow
2. (England) John Lowe
3. (Scotland) Jocky Wilson
4. (Sweden) Stefan Lord
5. (England) Bobby George
6. (England) Cliff Lazarenko
7. (United States) Nicky Virachkul
8. (England) Dave Whitcombe

== Prize money ==
The prize fund was £32,300.

Champion: £8,000
Runner-Up: £3,500
3rd Place: £500
Semi-Finalists (2): £1,750
Quarter-Finalists (4): £1,200
Last 16 (8): £700
Last 32 (16): £400

There was also a 9-Dart Checkout prize of £30,000, along with a High Checkout prize of £750. In the semi-final, Jocky Wilson missed double 18 for the 9-dart finish.

== The results ==
=== Preliminary round ===
A best of three sets preliminary round match took place between Alan Evans of Wales and Brent Bartholomew of New Zealand as they were tied on the rankings.

Player	Score	Player
(Wales) Alan Evans	2 – 1	Brent Bartholomew (New Zealand)

=== Last 32 ===
First round (best of 3 sets); 1–2 January
1	(England) Eric Bristow 85.68	2
(Scotland) Peter Masson 81.30	1
(England) Dave Lee 85.32	2
(Canada) Tony Holyoake 75.57	1
8	(England) Dave Whitcombe 84.12	2
(United States) Andy Green 75.96	1
(Wales) Tony Ridler 75.27	2
(Denmark) Finn Jensen 68.67	1
5	(England) Bobby George 73.62	0
(England) Tony Brown 74.67	2
(England) Alan Glazier 69.15	0
(United States) Jerry Umberger 74.64	2
4	(Sweden) Stefan Lord 79.98	2
(United States) KC Mullaney 75.30	1
(Wales) Ceri Morgan 81.93	0
(Belgium) Luc Marreel 82.68	2
2	(England) John Lowe 97.11	2
Q	(Wales) Alan Evans 86.43	0
(Wales) Peter Locke 83.19	0
(Australia) Terry O'Dea 87.51	2
7	(United States) Nicky Virachkul 82.47	1
(England) Keith Deller 85.26	2
(England) Les Capewell 76.23	2
(England) Stuart Holden 76.26	1
6	(England) Cliff Lazarenko 89.07	2
(Wales) Leighton Rees 83.94	0
(Wales) Tony Skuse 69.06	0
(Papua New Guinea) Paul Lim 70.95	2
3	(Scotland) Jocky Wilson 76.44	2
(Northern Ireland) Steve Brennan 78.63	0
(Scotland) Rab Smith 75.54	1
(Australia) Kevin White 79.17	2

Second round (best of 5 sets); 3–4 January
1	(England) Eric Bristow 95.79	3
(England) Dave Lee 88.53	2
8	(England) Dave Whitcombe 86.01	3
(Wales) Tony Ridler 85.20	2
(England) Tony Brown 82.89	3
(United States) Jerry Umberger 81.00	0
4	(Sweden) Stefan Lord 73.68	3
(Belgium) Luc Marreel 72.45	0
2	(England) John Lowe 87.72	3
(Australia) Terry O'Dea 86.40	2
(England) Keith Deller 91.14	3
(England) Les Capewell 80.01	1
6	(England) Cliff Lazarenko 83.58	3
(Papua New Guinea) Paul Lim 76.50	1
3	(Scotland) Jocky Wilson 79.11	3
(Australia) Kevin White 79.98	0

Quarter-finals (best of 7 sets); 5–6 January
1	(England) Eric Bristow 93.03	4
8	(England) Dave Whitcombe 87.36	3
(England) Tony Brown 83.19	4
4	(Sweden) Stefan Lord 82.11	1
2	(England) John Lowe 87.30	3
(England) Keith Deller 86.55	4
6	(England) Cliff Lazarenko 81.39	2
3	(Scotland) Jocky Wilson 86.13	4

Semi-finals (best of 9 sets); 7 January
1	(England) Eric Bristow 87.72	5
(England) Tony Brown 84.24	1
(England) Keith Deller 85.47	5
3	(Scotland) Jocky Wilson 85.74	3

Final (best of 11 sets); 8 January
1	(England) Eric Bristow 93.81	5
(England) Keith Deller 90.06	6

== Third-place match ==
- (Scotland) Jocky Wilson 90.30 (3) 2–0 Tony Brown (England) 79.95

(Bristow) played the percentage shot. Living dangerous, Bristow – he's banking on Deller not doing this. But the shot's on for the title. Double 12 for the title..... I am telling ya, I'm telling ya, I've seen nothing like it in my life. Keith Deller of Ipswich, 23 years old, he had to qualify to get here. Bristow did a percentage shot, Deller did the business. He's now the World Champion!

— BBC commentator Sid Waddell describes the 138 finish that gave Keith Deller the 1983 World Title
