= Patrick Clifford (darts player) =

Irish darts player (1938–2016)

Personal information
- Full name: Patrick James Clifford
- Born: 8 February 1938 Finglas, Dublin, Ireland
- Died: 24 August 2016 (aged 77)

Sport
- Sport: Darts
- Darts: 23g
- Laterality: Right-handed

Organisation (see split in darts)
- BDO: 1977–1978

WDF major events – best performances
- World Championship: Last 16: 1978
- World Masters: Last 64: 1977

Patrick James "Paddy" Clifford (8 February 1938 – 24 August 2016) was an Irish darts player who competed in British Darts Organisation (BDO) and World Darts Federation (WDF) events in the 1970s.

== Career ==
Clifford made his debut of the WDF World Cup in 1977 in an Irish team which contained, among others, Jim McQuillan. Clifford lost to Eric Bristow from England.

Also in 1977, he progressed to the second round of the World Masters, losing 3–0 to Louis van Iseghem from Belgium.

Clifford made one BDO World Darts Championship appearance in 1978, losing 6–0 to Rab Smith from Scotland. Clifford left the BDO in 1978.

== World Championship results ==
=== BDO ===
- 1978: 1st round (lost to Rab Smith 0–6) (legs)
