= Kenth Ohlsson =

Swedish darts player

Personal information
- Born: Sweden
- Home town: Sweden

Sport
- Sport: Darts
- Playing since: 1964
- Laterality: Right-handed

Organisation (see split in darts)
- BDO: 1977–1978

WDF major events – best performances
- World Championship: Last 16: 1978
- World Masters: Last 64: 1977

Other tournament wins
- Tournament: Years
- Sweden Masters: 1977

Kenth Ohlsson is a Swedish former professional darts player. Ohlsson made one BDO World Darts Championship appearance in 1978, losing 3–6 to fellow Swede Stefan Lord.

== World Championship results ==
=== BDO ===
- 1978: 1st round (lost to Stefan Lord 3–6) (legs)
