= Stuart Holden (darts player) =

English darts player

Sport
- Sport: Darts
- Playing since: 1975
- Laterality: Right-handed

Organisation (see split in darts)
- BDO: 1980–1983
- PDC: 2007–2015

WDF major events – best performances
- World Championship: Last 32: 1983
- World Masters: Last 16: 1980

PDC premier events – best performances
- UK Open: Last 128: 2007
- Desert Classic: Last 32: 2007
- Updated on 2 February 2019

Stuart Holden is an English former professional darts player.

== Career ==
Holden played in the 1983 BDO World Darts Championship, losing in the first round to Les Capewell. He had earlier lost in the first round of the 1980 Winmau World Masters to Jocky Wilson and reached the second round of the 1982 British Professional, beating Rab Smith in the first round before losing to Eric Bristow.

24 years after his appearance in the World Championship, Holden qualified for the PDC UK Open winning his preliminary and first round matches before losing in the second round to Nigel Birch. He then qualified for the 2007 Las Vegas Desert Classic, winning one of eight places in the second of the two qualifiers for the event. After an early exit in the first qualifier to Mick McGowan, Holden went on to defeat the likes of Dave Ladley, Andy Jenkins and Steve Hine to earn qualification. He was defeated in the first round by Gary Mawson.

Following his qualification to the Desert Classic, Holden joined the PDC full-time but has failed to make any real progress in floor tournaments and has failed to qualify for any of the majors tournaments since.

== World Championship results ==
=== BDO ===
- 1983: Last 32: (lost to Les Capewell 1–2) (sets)
