= Kevin Mullaney =

Welsh darts player

Personal information
- Full name: Kenneth Mullaney
- Nickname: "KC"
- Born: 23 September 1954 (age 72) Cook County, Illinois, United States

Sport
- Sport: Darts
- Playing since: 1974
- Darts: 24g
- Laterality: Right-handed
- Walk-on music: "Good Times Bad Times" by Led Zeppelin

Organisation (see split in darts)
- BDO: 1980–1985

WDF major events – best performances
- World Championship: Last 32: 1983
- World Masters: Last 32: 1982

Other tournament wins
- Tournament: Years
- WDF Pacific Cup Men's Pairs: 1980

Kenneth "Kevin" Mullaney (born 23 September 1954), or more commonly known as KC, is an American former professional darts player who has competed in British Darts Organisation (BDO) events in the 1980s.

== Career ==
Mullaney competed in the 1982 World Masters, losing in the first round to John Joe O'Shea. He also played in the 1983 BDO World Darts Championship, but was defeated in the first round by Swedish player Stefan Lord.

In 1985, Mullaney lost to Arnold Parke of Canada in the Windy City Open.

== World Championship results ==
=== BDO ===
- 1983: Last 32: (lost to Stefan Lord 1–2) (sets)
