= Finn Jensen (darts player) =

Danish darts player (1957–2008)

Personal information
- Born: 20 March 1957 Denmark
- Died: 11 January 2008 (aged 50) Denmark

Sport
- Sport: Darts
- Playing since: 1977
- Darts: 24g Tungsten
- Laterality: Right-handed

Organisation (see split in darts)
- BDO: 1978–1986

WDF major events – best performances
- World Championship: Last 32 1982, 1983, 1984
- World Masters: Last 32: 1979

Other tournament wins
- Tournament: Years
- Danish Classic Danish Championships: 1978; 1979, 1982, 1984, 1985
- Updated on 1 September 2021

Finn Jensen (1957–2008) was a Danish professional darts player who competed in the 1970s and 1980s.

== Career ==
He competed in three World Professional Darts Championships, losing in the first round on all three occasions. In 1982, he lost to Cliff Lazarenko. In 1983 he was defeated by the Welshman Tony Ridler in the first round and in 1984 he lost in the same round to Eric Bristow.

In 1979, he won the first of 4 Danish Championships, a record he shares with Frede Johansen.

Jensen died on 11 January 2007 at the age of 48.

== World Championship results ==
=== BDO ===
- 1982: Last 32: (lost to Cliff Lazarenko 0–2) (sets)
- 1983: Last 32: (lost to Tony Ridler 1–2)
- 1984: Last 32: (lost to Eric Bristow 0–2)
