= Tony Skuse =

Personal information
- Full name: Anthony Skuse
- Born: 9 February 1956 (age 70) Tonypandy, Wales
- Home town: Tonypandy, Wales

Sport
- Sport: Darts
- Playing since: 1975
- Darts: 23g
- Laterality: Right-handed
- Walk-on music: "Money for Nothing" by Dire Straits

Organisation (see split in darts)
- BDO: 1980–1988

WDF major events – best performances
- World Championship: Last 32: 1983
- World Masters: Last 64: 1981, 1987

Other tournament wins
- Tournament: Years
- BDO Gold Cup: 1981

Anthony Skuse (born 9 February 1956) is a former Welsh professional darts player who competed in the 1980s.

== Career ==
A winner of the 1981 British Gold Cup he beating John Corfe, Skuse reached the quarter-finals of the 1982 British Professional was beating Tim Gould and Les Capewell before losing 5–0 to Eric Bristow, who eventually won the tournament. He then competed in the 1983 BDO World Darts Championship but was defeated by Paul Lim in the first round.

== World Championship results ==
=== BDO ===
- 1983: Last 32: (lost to Paul Lim 0–2)
