= Halve it =

Darts game

Halve it is a darts game popular in the United Kingdom and parts of North America where competitors try to hit previously agreed targets on a standard dart board. Failure to do so within a single throw (3 darts) results in the player losing half their accumulated score. Any number of players can take part and the game can vary in length depending on the number of targets selected. The game can be tailored to the skill level of the players by selecting easy or difficult targets. It is one of the disciplines in the Pentathlon event.

Common selections include:

- Single selected number - Any number between 1 and 20 can be chosen and players have to hit it at least once during their throw to avoid penalty. If the player succeeds, that number is added to their total score. Doubles and trebles score as 2 times and 3 times respectively. If the number chosen was 20, and a player hits a single 20 and two treble 20s, 140 points are added to their score. If a player hits the treble 20 and misses with the other two darts, 60 is added to their score. If a player misses with all three darts, their score is halved.
- Any double - A player must hit any double during his throw to avoid penalty. Every double hit scores. If a player hits double 11, double 14 and double 8; 66 points are added to their score.
- Any treble - As above, except only trebles count.
- Selected score - The players must score a pre-selected amount. Doubles and trebles count. If they succeed that number of points will be added to their score. If they fail, their score will be halved. If the selected score is 51 for example, a player can elect to hit the 17 three times. If however he misses with his second dart and hits the 2 instead, he must then hit double 16 with his last dart to avoid penalty. Sometimes this is made more difficult by stipulating that all 3 darts must score thus a player who hits treble 17 with his first dart will fail.
- 3 different colours - In a single throw, the players must hit 3 out of the 4 colours on the scoring area of the dart board. If the player does so, the points scored are added to his score; if he fails, his score is halved. For example, a player who hits bull (red), 20 (black) and 19 (white) will score 89 points.
- Colour sequence - The players must hit a sequence of colours, usually black - white - black or vice versa. As usual if the player is successful he scores what he hits; if not, his score is halved. Better players will shoot 20, 19, 20 to maximise their score (59); less confident players may try 14, 11, 8 or similar.
- Number sequence - Players must hit a pre-arranged sequence of numbers to score. 1, 2, 3, for example.
- Inner ring - All 3 darts must land within the inner circle (between the treble ring and outer bull) to score. Trebles, the bull and the outer bull do not count and hitting any of these areas is a fail.
- Outer ring - All 3 darts must land within the outer circle (between the double and treble ring). Doubles and trebles do not count.
- 2 in, 1 out - The players must get 1 dart within the inner ring and the other 2 outside the inner ring but within the outer ring. Doubles, trebles, outer and inner bull, do not count.

	Player 1	Player 2	Player 3
Score	81	100	45
16	145	148	61
Double	167	74	31
6	179	104	37
Treble	90	134	61
B-W-B	129	163	93
25	179	81	47
Bull			

Most versions of the game have the players establishing a score with their first throw and targeting the inner bull with their last throw. The targets in between are often chosen by agreement and it is usual to select alternating easy and difficult ones. The selections are then recorded along with the competitors' names as shown in the adjacent table. Order of play can be determined by shooting the cork or drawing lots. If an odd number has to be halved, it is normally rounded up.

A game may play out as follows and as illustrated in the table. The first player hits T20, 20, 1 to score 81. Player 2 hits a ton (T20, 20, 20) and player 3 only manages 20, 20, 5 for a total of 45. The second throw is for the 16 and player 1 finds a treble and a single (64), player 2 hits three singles (48) and player 3 hits one. In the third round, the players must hit a double. Player 1 manages to hit the double 11 but the other two players miss. The following throw is for a 6; player 1 hits 2, player 2 hits a treble and two singles, and player 3 hits a single. The fifth round is for the treble. Player 1 misses, player 2 hits the treble 10 and player 3 the treble 8. In the next round the players must hit a black number followed by a white and a further black. Player 1 shoots 20, 1, 18 to add 39 points to his score, player 2 hits 13, 6, 10 for a further 29 and player 3 gets another 32 points by getting 14, 11, 8. In the penultimate round, player 1 hits the outer bull twice but the others miss. Player 1 must hit the bullseye twice in the final round to be certain of winning. If he hits it once, player 2 can win by hitting three. Player 3 cannot win unless player 1 misses.
