= Wayne Lock =

Retired professional darts player

Personal information
- Nickname: Lock Shot
- Born: 13 April 1956 (age 70) Pontypridd, Wales

Sport
- Sport: Darts
- Playing since: 1975
- Darts: 25g
- Laterality: Right-handed
- Walk-on music: "Future World" by Helloween

Organisation (see split in darts)
- BDO: 1980–1989

WDF major events – best performances
- World Championship: Last 32: 1981

Wayne Locke is a Welsh former professional darts player.

== Darts career ==
=== 1981 ===
On 14 January 1981, Lock played in the BDO World Darts Championship, beating by the preliminary round to Steve Brennan of Ireland and before losing in the first round to Rab Smith of Scotland winning a total of £300. Later in the year on 23 August, Lock played in the British Professional Championship but lost again in the first round to Alan Glazier winning a total of an unknown amount.

=== 1989 ===
On 1 January 1989, Lock made a comeback and played in the BDO British Open, but lost to Eric Bristow.

== World Championship results ==
=== BDO ===
- 1981: Last 32: (lost to Rab Smith 1–2)
