= Dave Lanning =

English sports commentator and journalist (1938–2016)

- Born: David Lanning; 24 March 1938; Poole, Dorset, England
- Died: 29 October 2016 (aged 78); England
- Occupations: Broadcaster; sports commentator; journalist
- Years active: 1972–2016
- Known for: Commentating on PDC darts events

Dave Lanning (24 March 1938 – 29 October 2016) was an English sports commentator and journalist, best known for his coverage of Professional Darts. He was brought up in Poole and educated at Poole Grammar School.

== Broadcasting career ==
He was one of the commentators for Sky Sports' coverage of the Professional Darts Corporation tournaments.

He covered the first PDC World Darts Championship with John Gwynne in 1994 and was ever present with the company for a long period, commentating on all their televised tournaments on Sky. Prior to the 2011 World Championship, Lanning announced that he had retired from commentating.

As part of ITV's World of Sport's original roster of commentators, he commentated on the first ever televised nine dart finish hit by John Lowe against Keith Deller on 13 October 1984. He commentated on all darts tournaments and World of Sport darts action broadcast on ITV from 1972 to 1988. He also commentated on speedway, a sport he knew well having been installed as the promoter of the West Ham team in 1966. He provided the commentary for The Indoor League and occasionally covered football for his home region of Southern Television in the mid-to-late 1970s. Lanning came out of retirement on New Year's Day 2013 when he commentated on Sky's 3D coverage of the PDC World Championship final between Phil Taylor & Michael Van Gerwen.

== Writing ==
Lanning had a stint as the television critic for The Sunday People newspaper. He had a 28-year association with TV Times, and was speedway correspondent for The Sun for 20 years.

== In popular culture ==
In An American Werewolf in London, Lanning is the commentator of the match on the TV between Rab Smith and Cliff Lazarenko.

== Death ==
Lanning died aged 78 on 29 October 2016 after a short illness.
