= Conrad Daniels =

American darts player (born 1941)

Personal information
- Full name: Conrad Edward Daniels
- Nickname: "American Ace"
- Born: September 11, 1941 (age 85) Trenton, New Jersey, U.S.
- Home town: Hamilton Township, Mercer County, New Jersey, U.S.

Sport
- Sport: Darts
- Playing since: 1959
- Darts: 20g
- Laterality: Right-handed
- Walk-on music: "Disco Inferno" by The Trammps

Organisation (see split in darts)
- BDO: 1975–1983

WDF major events – best performances
- World Championship: Quarter Finals: 1978
- World Masters: Quarter Finals: 1978

Other tournament wins
- Tournament: Years
- WDF Pacific Cup Singles British Pentathlon Indoor League US Open North American Open: 1974; 1975; 1975; 1975; 1975

Conrad Edward Daniels (born September 11, 1941) is an American former professional darts player who was active from the 1970s to the 1980s.

== Darts career ==
Daniels was an elite competitor who won or finished near the top of dozens of individual and team events in his career.

In 1975, Daniels won both the US Open and North American Open, and reached world #3 in the 1975-76 ratings of the European Darts Organization. He was also a member of the US team that took 2nd place at the 1979 World Cup, and a member of the team that finished in 2nd place at the 1980 Elkadart Nations Cup.

Daniels was one of the first American players to seriously challenge British darters at their own game. In 1975 he participated in The Indoor League Champion of Champions Dart Tournament, contested by the best players from around the world. Daniels famously defeated the then-reigning World Masters champion Cliff Inglis in the final. This was the first time an American won such a high-profile competition in the UK. Due in part to this victory, International Spider magazine named Daniels their inaugural "Darter of the Year." In 1978, in the very first match ever played at a World Professional Darts Championship, Daniels defeated the top seed of the event, highly favored Eric Bristow. Bristow, who would go on to become World Champion five times, later admitted in his autobiography that "[Daniels] got to me mentally." ESPN has described Daniels' upset of Bristow as "one of the great shocks in darts."

Daniels suffered first round defeats in the 1980 World Championship to Rab Smith of Scotland and in 1981 to Doug McCarthy of England. He never qualified for the event again. Daniels also played in the 1978 Winmau World Masters, beating Dave Lee to reach the quarter finals of the event, where he then lost to Tony Brown.

Daniels was a pioneering figure in the early days of darts popularity in the US. His successes abroad in the mid 1970s were recounted in scores of newspaper articles across the country at the time. Daniels was featured in a 1976 Sports Illustrated article, and appeared as a guest on the popular American television program The Mike Douglas Show in 1977. Later in his career, Daniels collected singles titles at the New York Open (1981), New Jersey Open (1982), and Washington Open (1984), and was elected to the US Darts Hall of Fame in 1987. Fellow American Hall-of-Famer Gerry Umberger singled out Daniels as having "one of the best minds I've seen in darts." Author Jack McClintock describes Daniels the dart player as "serenely and disconcertingly confident, with an intimidating coldness of concentration."

Daniels is a long-time resident of the Hamilton Square neighborhood of Hamilton Township, Mercer County, New Jersey, where he lives with his wife.

Daniels quit the BDO in January 1985.

The Greater Trenton Dart League in Mercer County, New Jersey honors Conrad yearly with their Mr. Trenton tournament where the winner receives the "Conrad Daniels Trophy"

== World Championship results ==
=== BDO ===
- 1978: Quarter Finals: (lost to Nicky Virachkul 4–6) (legs)
- 1979: Last 24: (lost to Rab Smith 1–2) (sets)
- 1980: Last 24: (lost to Doug McCarthy 0–2)
