= Maureen Flowers =

English darts player

Personal information
- Nickname: Goldfinger
- Born: 5 December 1946 (age 79) Leek, Staffordshire
- Home town: Stoke-on-Trent, Staffordshire

Sport
- Sport: Darts
- Playing since: 1971
- Laterality: Right-handed

Organisation (see split in darts)
- BDO: 1982–1988

WDF major events – best performances
- World Masters: Runner Up: 1982, 1988

Other tournament wins
- Tournament: Years
- British Open Denmark Open Finnish Open Pacific Masters Swedish Open North American Open WDF World Cup Pairs WDF World Cup Champions: 1982; 1980, 1981, 1982, 1983; 1985, 1987; 1986; 1978, 1979, 1980, 1981; 1977, 1979, 1981; 1983; 1983
- Updated on 27 January 2019

Maureen Flowers (née Hancock, born 5 December 1946) is an English retired professional darts player and was in the 1980s the world number-one female darts player.

== Early life ==
Flowers grew up in Norton Green. She learnt to play darts in her father's pub.

== Darts career ==
Flowers won the Ladies National Pairs with her friend Yvonne Allen. She began competing in the Indoor League, a first for televised darts, from 1976 and later became the inaugural professional female darts player.

She won the North American Open Dart Tournament (NAODT) three years in the Ladies' Singles category: 1977, 1979 and 1981.

Twice a World Masters finalist, Flowers lost on both occasions to Ann Marie Davies in 1982 and Mandy Solomons in 1988. At the WDF World Cup in 1983, she won the Women's Pairs (with Audrey Derham) and Women's Overall events.

Sponsored by Unicorn, Flowers designed her own signature darts.

Flowers appeared on the UK television show Bullseye in 1987 to score 310 for charity which was doubled to £620. She also scored over 301 on the 1989 series of Bullseye scoring 330 which was doubled to £660.

In 1988, Flowers quit professional darts. In 1996, she was entered into the National Darts Hall of Fame.

== Personal life ==
From 1978 to 1987, Flowers was in a relationship with Eric Bristow. She was also the first manager of Bristow's protégé, Phil Taylor, during the late 1980s and early 1990s. She was married to footballer John Flowers, and by extension sister-in-law to World Cup squad member Ron Flowers.
