= Stefan Lord =

Swedish darts player (1954–2026)

Personal information
- Born: 4 December 1954 Stockholm, Sweden
- Died: 14 October 2026 (aged 71)
- Home town: Pattaya, Thailand

Sport
- Sport: Darts
- Playing since: 1970
- Darts: 24g Winmau
- Laterality: Right-handed
- Walk-on music: "The Final Countdown" by Europe

Organisation (see split in darts)
- BDO: 1974–1991

WDF major events – best performances
- World Championship: Third Place: 1982
- World Masters: Semi-finals: 1981

Other tournament wins
- Tournament: Years
- Denmark Open News of the World Tournament WDF Europe Cup Pairs Swedish Open: 1977; 1978, 1980 1980, 1982, 1988; 1983

Stefan Lord (4 December 1954 – 14 October 2026) was a Swedish professional darts player who competed in events of the British Darts Organisation (BDO) in the 1970s, 1980s and 1990s, and was one of the nation's most successful players.

== Career ==
Lord competed at ten BDO World Darts Championships with his best run coming in 1982 where he finished in third place, beating Bobby George 2-1. He played in the first ever World Championship in 1978, reaching the semi-finals, losing to John Lowe. His final World Championship appearance came in 1988, losing in the first round to Paul Lim.

He also reached the semi finals of the Winmau World Masters in 1981 and won the News of the World Darts Championship twice in 1978 and 1980, becoming the first (and only) overseas player to win the tournament, and one of seven players to win it more than once. He finished runner-up in the 1983 North American Open.

Lord left the BDO in 1991.

== Death ==
Lord died in October 2026, at the age of 71.

== World Championship results ==
=== BDO ===
- 1978: Semi-finals (lost to John Lowe 4–8) (legs)
- 1979: 2nd round (lost to Rab Smith 1–2) (sets)
- 1980: 1st round (lost to Bill Lennard 1–2)
- 1981: 1st round (lost to Kevin White 1–2)
- 1982: Semi-finals (lost to Jocky Wilson 0–4)
- 1983: Quarter-finals (lost to Tony Brown 1–4)
- 1984: 2nd round (lost to Mike Gregory 1–4)
- 1985: 2nd round (lost to Cliff Lazarenko 0–3)
- 1986: 1st round (lost to Jocky Wilson 0–3)
- 1988: 1st round (lost to Paul Lim 0–3)

== Career finals ==
=== Independent major finals: 2 (2 titles) ===
Outcome	No.	Year	Championship	Opponent in the final	Score
Winner	1.	1978	News of the World Championship (1)	(England) John Coward	2–0 (l)
Winner	2.	1980	News of the World Championship (2)	(England) Dave Whitcombe	2–0 (l)

== Performance timeline ==
BDO

Tournament	1975	1976	1977	1978	1979	1980	1981	1982	1983	1984	1985	1986	1987	1988	1989
BDO World Championship	NYF			SF	2R	1R	1R	SF	QF	2R	2R	1R	DNP	1R	DNP
World Masters	2R	DNP	3R	2R	3R	4R	SF	3R	2R	2R	1R	3R	2R	DNP	2R
British Matchplay	NYF	DNP		QF	DNP										
Butlins Grand Masters	NYF		DNP	1R	QF	1R	QF	1R	1R	1R	DNP		NH		
MFI World Matchplay	Not held									1R	Did not play				NH
News of the World Darts Championship	???	1R	???	W	1R	W	QF	???					1R	???	

WDF majors performances
Tournament	Event	World Cup 1977	Euro Cup 1978	World Cup 1979	Euro Cup 1980	World Cup 1981	Euro Cup 1982	World Cup 1983	Euro Cup 1984	World Cup 1985	Euro Cup 1986	World Cup 1987	Euro Cup 1988	World Cup 1989
WDF World Cup & WDF Europe Cup	Singles	L32	QF	L32	Prelim.	L32	L16	QF	Prelim.	L32	L32	QF	L32	L64
WDF World Cup & WDF Europe Cup	Pairs	L16	?	?	W	?	W	L32	Prelim.	?	SF	?	W	L32
WDF World Cup & WDF Europe Cup	Team	SF	QF	QF	QF	SF	SF	SF	QF	QF	QF	QF	QF	L16
WDF World Cup & WDF Europe Cup	Overall	6th	6th	8th	RU	4th	RU	5th	10th	6th	5th	6th	RU	17th

Performance Table Legend
W	Won the tournament	RU	Runner-up	SF	Semifinalist	QF	Quarterfinalist	#R; RR; L#	Lost in # round Round-robin; Last # stage	DQ	Disqualified
DNQ	Did not qualify	DNP	Did not participate	WD	Withdrew	NH	Tournament not held	#R; RR; L#	Lost in # round Round-robin; Last # stage	NYF	Not yet founded
