= Kevin White (darts player) =

Australian darts player (1938–2015)

Personal information
- Nickname: The Aussie Ace
- Born: 6 August 1938 Sydney, Australia
- Died: 20 May 2015 (aged 76) Melbourne, Australia

Sport
- Sport: Darts
- Playing since: 1956
- Darts: 14g Unicorn
- Laterality: Right-handed

Organisation (see split in darts)
- BDO: 1976–1988
- PDC: 2005

WDF major events – best performances
- World Championship: Last 16: 1981, 1983
- World Masters: Semi-finals: 1976, 1982

Other tournament wins
- Tournament: Years
- BDO Golden Darts Pairs: 1977

Kevin White (6 August 1938 – 20 May 2015) was an Australian professional darts player who competed in the 1970s and 1980s.

== Career ==
White won the 1977 BDO Golden Darts Pairs with George Foster for Australia.

White reached the semi-finals of the 1976 World Masters before making his World Championship debut in the 1981 BDO World Darts Championship, beating 10th seed Stefan Lord in the first round before losing in the second round to 7th seed Jocky Wilson. A year later in the 1982 BDO World Darts Championship, White lost in the first round to fellow countryman Terry O'Dea. White then reached the semi-finals of the 1982 World Masters, beating Lord again before beating Doug McCarthy and Bobby George before losing to eventual World Master Dave Whitcombe. In the 1983 BDO World Darts Championship, he beat Rab Smith in the first round before losing in the second round again to Wilson. He suffered a first round exit in the 1984 BDO World Darts Championship in a defeat against Steve Brennan. White played in the 2005 New Zealand Open losing to Warren Parry 3 legs to 1.

White quit the BDO in 2005.

== World Championship results ==
=== BDO ===
- 1981: Last 16: (lost to Jocky Wilson 1–2) (sets)
- 1982: Last 32: (lost to Terry O'Dea 0–2)
- 1983: Last 16: (lost to Wilson 0–3)
- 1984: Last 32: (lost to Steve Brennan 1–2)
