= Rab Smith =

Scottish darts player (1948–2026)

Personal information
- Full name: Robert Burdon Smith
- Nickname: "Mr Golden Darts"
- Born: 29 May 1948 Moniaive, Scotland
- Died: 17 May 2026 (aged 77) Dumfries, Scotland

Sport
- Sport: Darts
- Playing since: 1968
- Darts: 21g Tungsten
- Laterality: Right-handed
- Walk-on music: "Save Your Kisses for Me" by Brotherhood of Man

Organisation (see split in darts)
- BDO: 1976–1983
- PDC: 2005
- WDF: 1976–1983

WDF major events – best performances
- World Championship: Quarter Finals: 1978, 1979
- World Masters: Runner-up: 1980

Other tournament wins
- Years
Scottish Masters	1976
NDAGB Scottish Champion	1976
Queen's Silver Jubilee 3's International Classic	1977
British Matchplay	1977
Golden Darts	1977
British Pentathlon	1977
NDAGB British Champion	1977
Europe Cup (Team)	1978
Nations Cup	1981

Robert Burdon Smith (29 May 1948 – 17 May 2026) was a Scottish professional darts player. He won numerous tournaments in the late 1970s and early 1980s when he was also twice a World Championship quarter-finalist. After a particularly successful 1977, his highest world ranking was No. 4 in early 1978. Smith retired from professional darts at a relatively young age in 1983 to spend more time with his children.

== Background ==
Smith was born in the Dumfriesshire village of Moniaive. He is the only son of Robert (a dairyman) and Kathleen Smith, and has a sister also named Kathleen. From finishing schooling at Wallace Hall in 1963 he worked in forestry. Darts writer Derek Brown in 1981 described Smith as "only 5ft 7in (1.70m) and is wiry with a muscular build one might expect of a woodcutter."

Smith changed his line of work in 1993 to be a crane operator. He continued with this vocation until he took early retirement in 2011. He married Doreen and had two children who share the names of his parents, Kathleen and Robert.

== Darts career ==
=== Early years in darts ===
Smith was introduced to darts around the age of 9 or 10 by his father. Smith told Patrick Chaplin in 2011, "The family lived in a big house in the country and I used to practice and practice."

He joined a darts team in the Dumfries pub league around the age of 16. His inspiration to improve was a local player named Joe Little at another Dumfries pub, The Hole I' The Wa' (The Hole in the Wall)."From the age of sixteen I would go into town to play darts. I met Joe Little in the pub and we played darts and he beat me. I kept going back and he kept beating me. I really wanted to beat him. I practiced and practiced and worked on my game, mostly on Saturday lunchtimes and at night because I worked all day. I also practiced 12 noon to 1 p.m. most days as well… practice, practice, practice. Then all the practice paid off and I beat him."

In 1973 his ability as a Dumfries county player was quickly recognised by the newly-founded Scottish Darts Association (SDA). He debuted for Scotland in the 1973 Home Internationals. Smith continued to represent Scotland until he gave up professional darts in the early 1980s. He succeeded George Nicol to captain Scotland for five of those years.

=== Peak ===
Smith's breakthrough on the major tournament circuit was winning the Scottish Masters in 1976 beating Dave Hill in the final. He became the NDAGB Scottish Champion that same year.

1977 was Smith's best year. He was the NDAGB British Champion playing in the final the north-west's Eric Barlow. Barlow had pulled off the shock of the tournament in beating the then world number one, John Lowe. Smith beat Barlow 2–0.

In defending the Scottish Masters he was runner-up to Bobby Semple.

In March he represented Scotland in the Queen's Silver Jubilee 3's International Classic with team mates George Nicol and Eric MacLean in London. With the final all square between Scotland and England, Smith played Eric Bristow in the decider. Bristow was way in front after twelve darts before having 'double trouble'. Smith described in one report 'had stolen up like a black cat in the night', and threw a 72 finish to clinch the trophy.

Smith won the 1977 British Pentathlon. He beat Alan Glazier in the final.

In winning the 1977 British Matchplay he beat Bill Lennard in the semi-finals and then Eric Bristow in the final. With the final all square at 3–3, Smith stood at the oche needing 36. Bristow appeared to know what would happen and put his darts down on the table. Smith initially hit single 18 but then finished on double 9. Smith had hit four maximum 180s during that final.

In 1977 he also won the Golden Darts Championship. He eliminated Andre Declerq of Belgium and Wales' Alan Evans and then beat John Lowe in the final. As well as the £1,000 first prize Smith was also presented with a set of 18ct 'golden darts' and a special prize of 'a mere quarter ounce gold nugget' for scoring 180. In 2007 Smith gave the 'golden darts' to his grandson Rory for his first birthday.

On the announcement of the world rankings in early 1978 Smith placed at four. If he had just one more major tournament win in 1977 he would have been ranked at number one.

In 1978 he represented Scotland as his team were WDF Europe Cup Team Winners.

In 1979 he was third in the British Pentathlon. John Lowe beat Eric Bristow in the final.

Smith reached the final of the 1980 Winmau World Masters, beating Cliff Lazarenko, Canadian Bob Sinnaeve and USA's Nicky Virachkul to reach the final. He lost to John Lowe.

The same year he again reached the WDF Europe Team Cup Final. Paired with Alistair Forrester the Scots lost out in the final to the Swedish pair of Stefan Lord and Bjørn Enqvist. In the singles event of that year's tournament he reached the semi-final.

In 1981 captaining Jocky Wilson and Angus Ross for Scotland, Smith won the 1981 BDO Nations Cup beating Bristow, Lowe and Lazarenko of England in the final. Each Scot won their leg against Lazarenko. Smith also defeated Lowe and Wilson beat Bristow for a 5–4 win. Dave Lanning commentating described "The indeterminable Rab Smith" as, "A fine, fluid player on his day" and "a dapper little character, there's a lot said about the big gross darts players but Rab presents a very neat, clean cut image."

Lowe beat Smith 2–1 in the News of the World Individual Darts Championship semi final at the Wembley Arena. Smith later said, "I was on double four with John back on 140 or 160. He threw and left double top. In my next throw I clipped the top wire of double four three times. Then John hit double top."

=== BDO World Championships ===
Smith played in the first six successive Embassy World Darts Championships. In the first ever World Championship in 1978, Smith defeated Ireland's Patrick Clifford 6–0 in the first round but lost in the quarter-finals to Sweden's Stefan Lord.

In 1979, Smith beat United States's Conrad Daniels in the first round and then avenged his defeat of Lord in the previous year by beating him in the second round, he went on to bow out in the quarter-final once more, losing to then-reigning champion Leighton Rees of Wales.

Smith suffered a first round exit in 1980, lost to Tony Sontag. In 1981, he beat Wayne Lock in the first round, before losing to Nicky Virachkul in the second round.

He then suffered two successive first round exits firstly to fellow Scot and that year's winner, Jocky Wilson in 1982. In 1983 he was eliminated by Australian Kevin White.

=== Retirement from darts ===
By 1983 Smith by his own admission had 'had enough'. "The kids were young and I was never at home; sometimes being away six days a week. I didn't want to lose my family life so I gave up." When asked if he had regrets from giving up professional darts at a relatively young age Smith said, "Not really. There was always too much travel: hundreds of miles." Smith also gave up playing county darts around the same time.

== Death ==
Smith died at Dumfries and Galloway Royal Infirmary in Dumfries on 17 May 2026, aged 77. The funeral was arranged for 24 June in Tinwald, near Smith's home in Heathhall. Cancer and dog rescue charities were suggested for those wishing to make donations.

== World Championship performances results ==
=== BDO ===
- 1978: Quarter-finals (lost to Stefan Lord 3–6) (legs)
- 1979: Quarter-finals (lost to Leighton Rees 0–3) (sets)
- 1980: 1st round (lost to Tony Sontag 1–2)
- 1981: 2nd round (lost to Nicky Virachkul 0–2)
- 1982: 1st round (lost to Jocky Wilson 0–2)
- 1983: 1st round (lost to Kevin White 1–2)

== Career finals ==
=== BDO major finals: 2 (1 title, 1 runner-up) ===
Outcome	No.	Year	Championship	Opponent in the final	Score
Winner	1.	1977	British Matchplay	(England) Eric Bristow	3–2 (s)
Runner-up	1.	1980	World Masters	(England) John Lowe	0–2 (s)

== Performance timeline ==
Tournament	1977	1978	1979	1980	1981	1982	1983
BDO World Championship	NYF	QF	QF	1R	2R	1R	1R
World Masters	1R	4R	4R	F	2R	DNP	
British Matchplay	W	QF	DNP				
British Professional	Not held				1R	1R	DNP
Butlins Grand Masters	SF	DNP					
News of the World	???				SF	???	

WDF majors performances
Tournament	Event	World Cup 1977	Euro Cup 1978	World Cup 1979	Euro Cup 1980	World Cup 1981
WDF World Cup & WDF Europe Cup	Singles	QF	L32	L16	SF	L32
WDF World Cup & WDF Europe Cup	Pairs	?	L16	L16	RU	SF
WDF World Cup & WDF Europe Cup	Team	QF	W	QF	SF	RU
WDF World Cup & WDF Europe Cup	Overall	5th	RU	6th	3rd	RU

== In popular culture ==
In the 1981 John Landis film An American Werewolf in London, Smith is the player throwing darts in a match on TV in the apartment of the character played by Jenny Agutter. Smith's opponent is Cliff Lazarenko.
