= Tony Ridler =

Welsh darts player (1954–2015)

Personal information
- Full name: Anthony Ridler
- Born: 21 January 1954 Newport, Wales
- Died: 16 January 2015 (aged 60) Newport, Wales

Sport
- Sport: Darts
- Playing since: 1969
- Laterality: Right-handed

Organisation (see split in darts)
- BDO: 1977–1983
- PDC: 2006

WDF major events – best performances
- World Championship: Last 16: 1983
- World Masters: 3rd Place: 1977

Other tournament wins
- Tournament: Years
- Warwickshire Open: 1977
- Updated on 27 March 2019

Anthony Ridler (21 January 1954 – 16 January 2015) was a Welsh professional darts player who competed in the 1970s and 1980s. However, he made comebacks in 1997 and also in 2006.

== Achievements ==
Ridler was born in Newport, Monmouthshire. He was one of the Welsh players who showed promise during the 1970s by winning the 1973 CIU (Club and Institute Union) Individual and the 1977 Warwickshire Open. He reached the semi-finals of the 1977 Winmau World Masters and was runner-up in the 1979 British Gold Cup (to John Lowe) and British Open pairs in 1980.

However, as darts began to become more popular during the 1980s, Ridler faded from the scene and wasn't able to make an impact on the game. He only made one appearance at the World Championship in the 1983 event and won his first round match against the Dane, Finn Jensen but was defeated in the second round by Dave Whitcombe.

Ridler's first comeback in 1997 saw him reaching the last 32 of the revived News of the World Darts Championship and also reaching the last 16 of the World Matchplay Last 40 to Gerome Vardaro 1-6 wins to Last 32 to Gerald Verrier 5-8 and lost to Last 16 Peter Evison by 5-8. The last event in which he featured in the later stages was at a PDC UK Open regional qualifier in 2006 when he lost in the early stages to Andy Hamilton.

Ridler played with an unusual throwing action which saw him throw his darts almost from the tip of his nose. Ridler's son, Tony had a darts career from 2004 to 2006, which saw him winning the category 1 WDF-run Welsh Open.

Ridler died of kidney cancer at the age of 60 on 16 January 2014.

== World Championship results ==
=== BDO ===
- 1983: Last 16 (lost to Dave Whitcombe 2–3)
