= John Lowe (darts player) =

English darts player (born 1945)

John Lowe MBE
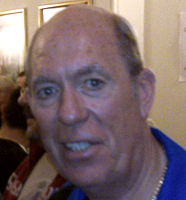
- Lowe in 2009

Personal information
- Nickname: "Old Stoneface"
- Born: 21 July 1945 (age 81) New Tupton, Derbyshire, England
- Home town: Chesterfield, Derbyshire, England

Sport
- Sport: Darts
- Playing since: 1966
- Darts: 21g Unicorn John Lowe Phase 3 Gold 90%
- Laterality: Right-handed
- Walk-on music: "Here I Go Again" by Whitesnake

Organisation (see split in darts)
- BDO: 1976–1993
- PDC: 1993–2007 (founding member)

WDF major events – best performances
- World Championship: Winner (3): 1979, 1987, 1993
- World Masters: Winner (2): 1976, 1980

PDC premier events – best performances
- World Championship: Semi-final: 1995, 1996
- World Matchplay: Semi-final: 1995, 2002
- World Grand Prix: Semi-final: 2001
- UK Open: Last 16: 2005

WSDT major events – best performances
- World Championship: Last 16: 2022
- World Matchplay: Last 16: 2022
- World Masters: Last 16: 2022

Other tournament wins
- Years
News of the World	1981
Butlins Grand Masters	1977
MFI World Matchplay	1984
British Matchplay	1978, 1985
Australian Grand Masters	1985
Autumn Gold Cider Masters	1987
BDO British Classic	1981, 1982, 1985, 1987
BDO Gold Cup	1978, 1979, 1982
British Open	1977, 1988
British Pentathlon	1976, 1978, 1979, 1980, 1982, 1983, 1984, 1985, 1986, 1987
Canadian Open	1979, 1984, 1986, 1987, 1989
Denmark Open	1978, 1979, 1982, 1985, 1987
Dry Blackthorn Cider Masters	1983, 1986
Finnish Open	1992
French Open	1986
MFI World Pairs	1986
North American Open	1985, 1987
Welsh Open	1982

Other achievements
- 1984 – First televised nine-dart finish 1986 to 1993 – WDF England Captain (unbeaten)
Medal record
Men's Darts
Representing England
WDF World Cup
Gold medal – first place	1977 London	Men's pairs
Gold medal – first place	1979 Las Vegas	Men's pairs
Gold medal – first place	1979 Las Vegas	Men's team
Gold medal – first place	1979 Las Vegas	Men's overall
Gold medal – first place	1981 Nelson	Men's singles
Gold medal – first place	1981 Nelson	Men's team
Gold medal – first place	1981 Nelson	Men's overall
Gold medal – first place	1983 Edinburgh	Men's pairs
Gold medal – first place	1983 Edinburgh	Men's team
Gold medal – first place	1983 Edinburgh	Men's overall
Gold medal – first place	1985 Brisbane	Men's pairs
Gold medal – first place	1985 Brisbane	Men's overall
Gold medal – first place	1987 Copenhagen	Men's pairs
Gold medal – first place	1987 Copenhagen	Men's team
Gold medal – first place	1987 Copenhagen	Men's overall
Gold medal – first place	1989 Toronto	Men's pairs
Gold medal – first place	1989 Toronto	Men's overall
Gold medal – first place	1991 Zandvoort	Men's singles
Gold medal – first place	1991 Zandvoort	Men's team
Gold medal – first place	1991 Zandvoort	Men's overall
Silver medal – second place	1977 London	Men's team
Silver medal – second place	1977 London	Men's overall
Bronze medal – third place	1983 Edinburgh	Men's singles
Bronze medal – third place	1985 Brisbane	Men's team
Bronze medal – third place	1989 Toronto	Men's team
WDF Europe Cup
Gold medal – first place	1978 Copenhagen	Men's singles
Gold medal – first place	1978 Copenhagen	Men's pairs
Gold medal – first place	1978 Copenhagen	Men's overall
Gold medal – first place	1980 Ebbw Vale	Men's team
Gold medal – first place	1980 Ebbw Vale	Men's overall
Gold medal – first place	1984 The Hague	Men's singles
Gold medal – first place	1984 The Hague	Men's team
Gold medal – first place	1984 The Hague	Men's overall
Gold medal – first place	1986 Turku	Men's singles
Gold medal – first place	1986 Turku	Men's pairs
Gold medal – first place	1986 Turku	Men's team
Gold medal – first place	1986 Turku	Men's overall
Gold medal – first place	1988 Yarmouth	Men's overall
Gold medal – first place	1990 Paola	Men's team
Gold medal – first place	1990 Paola	Men's overall
Gold medal – first place	1992 Helsinki	Men's team
Gold medal – first place	1992 Helsinki	Men's overall
Silver medal – second place	1990 Paola	Men's pairs
Silver medal – second place	1992 Helsinki	Men's singles
Bronze medal – third place	1978 Copenhagen	Men's team
Bronze medal – third place	1980 Ebbw Vale	Men's pairs
Bronze medal – third place	1988 Yarmouth	Men's team
Bronze medal – third place	1992 Helsinki	Men's pairs
- Updated on 19 October 2022

John Lowe (born 21 July 1945) is an English former professional darts player. One of the most prominent darts players from the late 1970s onwards, Lowe was world champion on three occasions, in 1979, 1987 and 1993. He was also a two-time winner of the World Masters and lifted the World Cup singles title on two occasions. Lowe won 15 British Darts Organisation (BDO) and World Darts Federation (WDF) majors, and was the world number one on four occasions. In October 1984, he became the first player to hit a televised nine-dart finish.

Lowe is one of only six players to have been world champion three or more times and was the first person to win it in three separate decades, one of only two players to do so. Amidst growing dissatisfaction with the British Darts Organisation, Lowe was also one of 16 players who in 1993 broke away to form their own governing body, the World Darts Council (now known as the Professional Darts Corporation).

== Career ==
Lowe won the World Championship title in three different decades – 1979, 1987 and 1993. He met Eric Bristow six times in the World Championship in various semi-finals and finals, and it was not until his fourth attempt (in the 1987 final) that he managed to overcome his rival. His record against Bristow in majors was three wins and six defeats.

Lowe achieved the first-ever televised nine-dart finish on 13 October 1984, during the World Matchplay tournament against Keith Deller, although it was not live and instead shown on a highlights programme on ITV. It was achieved via a rare third-visit combination of treble 17, treble 18 and double 18. For the nine-dart finish, Lowe received £102,000, he went on to win the tournament, for which he received £12,000, and earned an additional £1,000 for the tournament's highest outshot (161). This remained the highest amount of money earned by a darts player at a single tournament for almost two decades.

In addition to his three world titles, Lowe has also won two World Masters titles, two British Open titles, two British Matchplay championships, two World Cup Singles, and three European Cup Singles Titles, as well as other titles around the world in his career. He played for England over 100 times and was WDF England captain between 1986 and 1993, during which time England remained unbeaten.

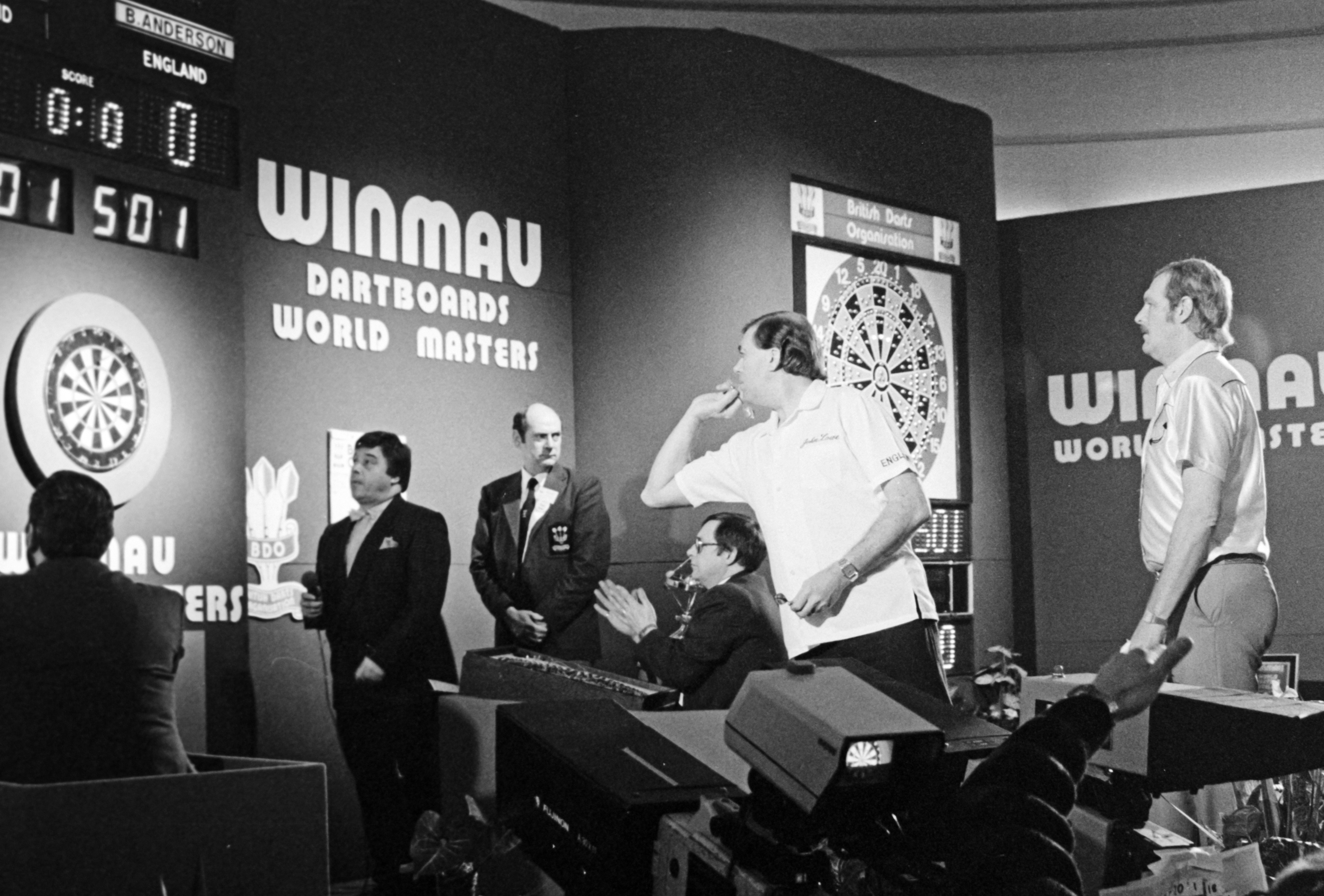
John Lowe v Bob Anderson at the Winmau World Masters 1985 Quarter Final

A composed performer, his demeanor was captured in his nickname Old Stoneface, which was also the title of Lowe's autobiography published in 2005.

Lowe enjoyed a longevity in darts. He played in the televised stages of the World Championship for a then-record 28 consecutive years, from the inaugural championship in 1978 to his last appearance in 2005.

Lowe played at the Alexandra Palace in 1980 in front of 7,000 people in the News of the World Championship.

Lowe also dominated the British Pentathlon event, winning it ten times, including six in a row from 1982 to 1987. He stopped entering the event because the prizemoney had not changed in 12 years and cost players £100 to enter, plus expenses.

Lowe was a founding member of the Professional Darts Players Association (PDPA). In 2005, he enjoyed a testimonial year in the sport to commemorate his 30th year as a professional. He attempted to qualify for the World Championship each year until 2008, but he fell short in the early qualifying rounds. After this, he joined a short-lived venture, the Setanta Sports–televised BetFred League of Legends in 2008.

=== Post-darts career ===
In May 2009, Lowe released a book, The Art of Darts, in which he offered his personal insights into the game to both amateur and aspiring professional dart players. In 2013, The Art of Darts was produced in app-form for the iPhone and iPad.

In 2014, Lowe was one of several celebrities to take part in ITV's new game show Amazing Greys, in which members of the public take on icons of British sport and entertainment.

== Personal life ==
Lowe was born in New Tupton, Derbyshire. He is married to Karen and lives in Chesterfield. They both support Sunderland football club. He was awarded an MBE in 2018.

== World Championship results ==
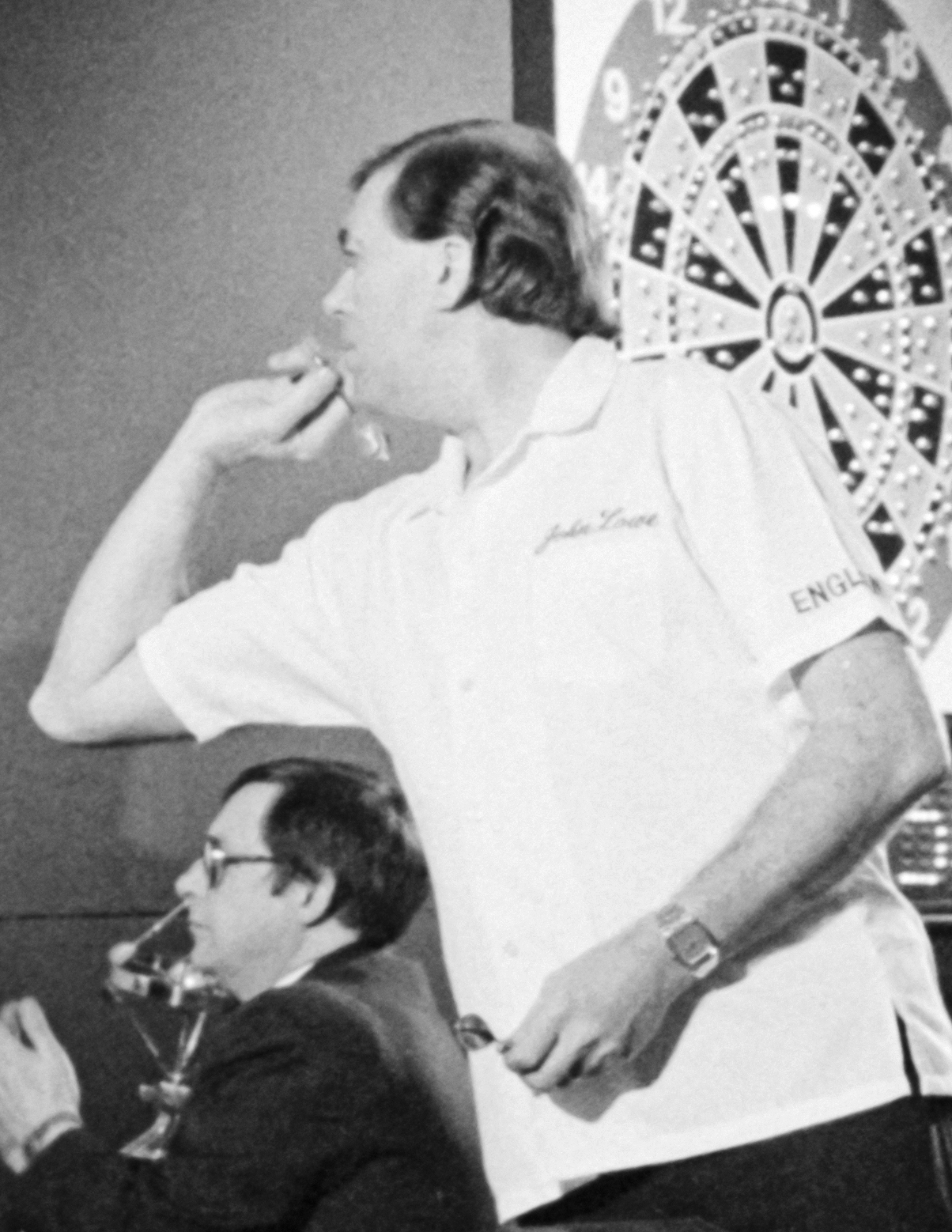
John Lowe at the 1985 World Masters

=== BDO ===
- 1978: Runner-up (lost to Leighton Rees 7–11 legs)
- 1979: Winner (beat Leighton Rees 5–0 sets)
- 1980: 2nd round (lost to Cliff Lazarenko 0–2)
- 1981: Runner-up (lost to Eric Bristow 3–5)
- 1982: Runner-up (lost to Jocky Wilson 3–5)
- 1983: Quarter-finals (lost to Keith Deller 3–4)
- 1984: Semi-finals (lost to Eric Bristow 0–6)
- 1985: Runner-up (lost to Eric Bristow 2–6)
- 1986: Quarter-finals (lost to Bob Anderson 3–4)
- 1987: Winner (beat Eric Bristow 6–4)
- 1988: Runner-up (lost to Bob Anderson 4–6)
- 1989: Semi-finals (lost to Eric Bristow 1–5)
- 1990: 2nd round (lost to Ronnie Sharp 2–3)
- 1991: 1st round (lost to Peter Evison 2–3)
- 1992: Semi-finals (lost to Phil Taylor 4–5)
- 1993: Winner (beat Alan Warriner 6–3)

=== PDC ===
- 1994: Group Stage (beat Tom Kirby 3–2 and lost to Larry Butler 2–3)
- 1995: Semi-finals (lost to Phil Taylor 4–5)
- 1996: Semi-finals (lost to Phil Taylor 1–5)
- 1997: Last 24 group (lost to Jamie Harvey 2–3 and beat Paul Lim 3–1)
- 1998: Last 24 group (lost to Peter Manley 0–3 and lost to Gary Mawson 0–3)
- 1999: 2nd round (lost to Phil Taylor 1–3)
- 2000: Quarter-finals (lost to Dennis Smith 3–5)
- 2001: 2nd round (lost to Jamie Harvey 0–3)
- 2002: 2nd round (lost to Peter Manley 5–6)
- 2003: 2nd round (lost to Les Fitton 1–4)
- 2004: 3rd round (lost to Alan Warriner 3–4)
- 2005: 2nd round (lost to John Verwey 2–3)

=== WSDT ===
- 2022: 2nd round (lost to Dave Prins 0–3)

== Career finals ==
=== BDO major finals: 25 (9 titles, 16 runners-up) ===
Legend
World Championship (3–5)
World Masters (2–3)
British Professional (0–4)
World Matchplay (1–1)
Grand Masters (1–2)
British Matchplay (2–1)

Outcome	No.	Year	Championship	Opponent in the final	Score (Note: (l) = score in legs, (s) = score in sets.)
Winner	1.	1976	World Masters (1)	(Wales) Phil Obbard	3–0 (s)
Winner	2.	1977	Butlins Grand Masters (1)	(England) Eric Bristow	5–4 (l)
Runner-up	1.	1978	World Darts Championship	(Wales) Leighton Rees	7–11 (l)
Winner	3.	1978	British Matchplay (1)	(England) Tony Brown	2–1 (s)
Runner-up	2.	1978	Butlins Grand Masters	(Wales) Leighton Rees	2–5 (l)
Winner	4.	1979	World Darts Championship (1)	(Wales) Leighton Rees	5–0 (s)
Winner	5.	1980	World Masters (2)	(Scotland) Rab Smith	2–0 (s)
Runner-up	3.	1981	World Darts Championship (2)	(England) Eric Bristow	3–5 (s)
Runner-up	4.	1981	Butlins Grand Masters (2)	(England) Eric Bristow	unknown
Runner-up	5.	1981	British Professional Championship	(Scotland) Jocky Wilson	5–6 (s)
Runner-up	6.	1981	World Masters	(England) Eric Bristow	1–2 (s)
Runner-up	7.	1982	World Darts Championship	(Scotland) Jocky Wilson	3–5 (s)
Runner-up	8.	1982	British Professional Championship (2)	(England) Eric Bristow	3–7 (s)
Winner	6.	1984	MFI World Matchplay (1)	(England) Cliff Lazarenko	5–3 (s)
Runner-up	9.	1984	British Professional Championship (3)	(England) Mike Gregory	5–7 (s)
Runner-up	10.	1985	World Darts Championship (4)	(England) Eric Bristow	2–6 (s)
Winner	7.	1985	British Matchplay (2)	(England) Cliff Lazarenko	3–0 (s)
Runner-up	11.	1985	British Professional Championship (4)	(England) Eric Bristow	4–7 (s)
Winner	8.	1987	World Darts Championship (2)	(England) Eric Bristow	6–4 (s)
Runner-up	12.	1987	MFI World Matchplay	(England) Bob Anderson	1–5 (s)
Runner-up	13.	1987	World Masters (2)	(England) Bob Anderson	1–3 (s)
Runner-up	14.	1988	World Darts Championship (5)	(England) Bob Anderson	4–6 (s)
Runner-up	15.	1988	British Matchplay	(England) Bob Anderson	2–3 (s)
Runner-up	16.	1988	World Masters (3)	(England) Bob Anderson	2–3 (s)
Winner	9.	1993	World Darts Championship (3)	(England) Alan Warriner	6–3 (s)

=== WDF major finals: 6 (5 titles, 1 runner-up) ===
Legend
World Cup (2–0)
Europe Cup (3–1)

Outcome	No.	Year	Championship	Opponent in the final	Score
Winner	1.	1978	Europe Cup Singles (1)	(Scotland) Jocky Wilson	4–1 (l)
Winner	2.	1981	World Cup Singles (1)	(Scotland) Jocky Wilson	4–3 (l)
Winner	3.	1984	Europe Cup Singles (2)	(Wales) Leighton Rees	4–0 (l)
Winner	4.	1986	Europe Cup Singles (3)	(England) Cliff Lazarenko	4–2 (l)
Winner	5.	1991	World Cup Singles (2)	(Wales) Martin Phillips	6–4 (l)
Runner-up	1.	1992	Europe Cup Singles	(England) Phil Taylor	2–4 (l)

=== Independent major finals: 1 (1 title) ===
Outcome	No.	Year	Championship	Opponent in the final	Score
Winner	1.	1981	News of the World Championship (1)	(England) Mick Norris	2–0 (l)

== Performance timeline ==
CF= County Finals, DF= Divisional Finals

BDO majors performances
Tournament	1976	1977	1978	1979	1980	1981	1982	1983	1984	1985	1986	1987	1988	1989	1990	1991	1992	1993
BDO World Championship	NYF		RU	W	2R	RU	RU	QF	SF	RU	QF	W	RU	SF	2R	1R	SF	W
World Masters	W	QF	3R	QF	W	RU	3R	SF	4R	QF	3R	RU	RU	1R	SF	QF	3R	DNP
British Matchplay	QF	QF	W	QF	QF	QF	SF	SF	QF	W	QF	QF	RU	QF	QF	QF	DNP	
British Professional	Not held					RU	RU	SF	RU	RU	1R	2R	1R	Not held				
Butlins Grand Masters	NH	W	RU	SF	SF	RU	SF	QF	QF	SF	1R	Not held						
MFI World Matchplay	Not held								W	1R	1R	RU	QF	Not held				
News of the World	???	SF	???	CF	SF	W	???		DF	CF	???	DF	DF	CF	???	Not held		

WDF majors performances
Tournament	Event	World Cup 1977	Euro Cup 1978	World Cup 1979	Euro Cup 1980	World Cup 1981	Euro Cup 1982	World Cup 1983	Euro Cup 1984	World Cup 1985	Euro Cup 1986	World Cup 1987	Euro Cup 1988	World Cup 1989	Euro Cup 1990	World Cup 1991	Euro Cup 1992
WDF World Cup & WDF Europe Cup	Singles	L16	W	QF	L32	W	DNP	SF	W	L16	W	L32	L32	L32	L32	W	RU
WDF World Cup & WDF Europe Cup	Pairs	W	W	W	L16	RU	DNP	W	L16	W	W	W	QF	W	RU	L16	SF
WDF World Cup & WDF Europe Cup	Team	RU	SF	W	W	W	DNP	W	W	SF	W	W	SF	SF	W	W	W
WDF World Cup & WDF Europe Cup	Overall	RU	W	W	W	W	DNP	W	W	W	W	W	W	W	W	W	W

PDC majors performances
Tournament	1994	1995	1996	1997	1998	1999	2000	2001	2002	2003	2004	2005
PDC World Championship	RR	SF	SF	RR	RR	2R	QF	2R	2R	2R	2R	2R
World Matchplay	1R	SF	2R	1R	1R	1R	QF	2R	SF	1R	1R	DNP
World Grand Prix	Not yet founded				QF	DNP	1R	SF	1R	1R	DNP	
UK Open	Not held									3R	1R	6R

Performance Table Legend
W	Won the tournament	RU	Runner-up	SF	Semifinalist	QF	Quarterfinalist	#R; RR; L#	Lost in # round Round-robin; Last # stage	DQ	Disqualified
DNQ	Did not qualify	DNP	Did not participate	WD	Withdrew	NH	Tournament not held	#R; RR; L#	Lost in # round Round-robin; Last # stage	NYF	Not yet founded

== Nine-dart finishes ==
Lowe accomplished the first-ever televised nine-dart finish.

John Lowe televised nine-dart finishes
Date	Opponent	Tournament	Method	Prize
13 October 1984	(England) Keith Deller	World Matchplay	3 x T20; 3 x T20; T17, T18, D18	£102,000
