= Eric Bristow =

English darts player (1957–2018)

Eric Bristow MBE
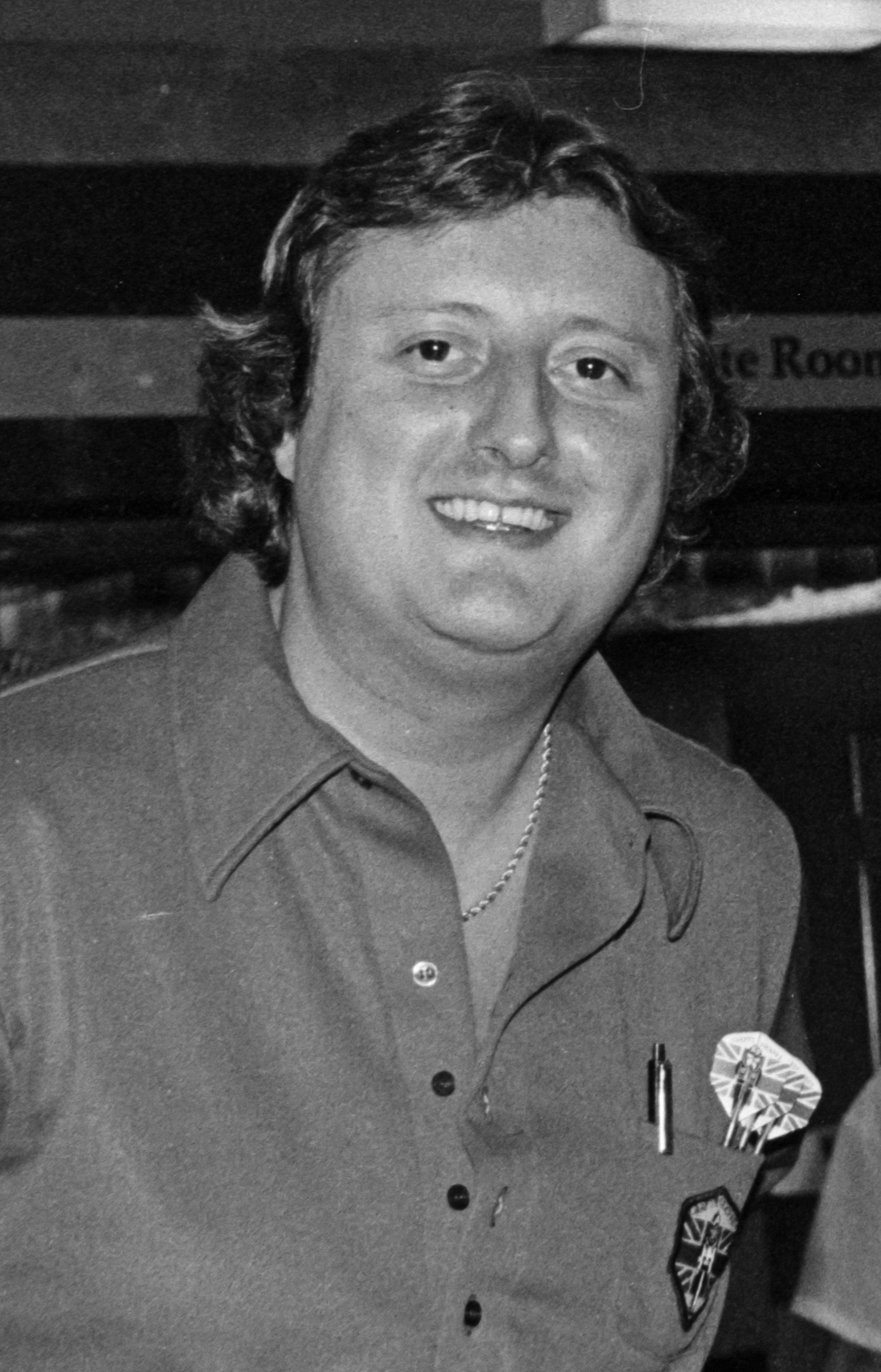
- Bristow in 1985

Personal information
- Full name: Eric John Bristow
- Nickname: "The Crafty Cockney"
- Born: 25 April 1957 Hackney, London, England
- Died: 5 April 2018 (aged 60) Liverpool, England

Sport
- Sport: Darts
- Playing since: 1968
- Darts: 22g Harrows Signature
- Laterality: Right-handed
- Walk-on music: "Rabbit" by Chas & Dave "Crazy Crazy Nights" by Kiss

Organisation (see split in darts)
- BDO: 1976–1993
- PDC: 1993–2007 (Founding Member)

WDF major events – best performances
- World Championship: Winner (5): 1980, 1981, 1984, 1985, 1986
- World Masters: Winner (5): 1977, 1979, 1981, 1983, 1984

PDC premier events – best performances
- World Championship: Semi-final: 1997
- World Matchplay: Last 32: 1994, 1995, 1996, 1997, 1998, 1999

Other tournament wins
- Years
| British Open | 1978, 1981, 1983, 1986 |
| Dry Blackthorn Cider Masters | 1984, 1985, 1987 |
| BDO Gold Cup | 1980 |
| Isle of Man Darts Challenge | 1983 |
| MFI World Pairs | 1987 |
| PDC World Pairs | 1995 |
| WDF World Cup Singles | 1983, 1985, 1987, 1989 |
| WDF World Cup Pairs – (Team event) | 1977, 1979, 1983, 1985, 1987, 1989 |
| WDF World Cup Team – (Team event) | 1979, 1981, 1983, 1987, 1991 |
| WDF Europe Cup Pairs | 1978, 1986 |
| Best Old Major Results |
| News of the World | 1983, 1984 |
| Butlins Grand Masters | 1981, 1982, 1983, 1985, 1986 |
| MFI World Matchplay | 1985, 1988 |
| British Professional | 1982, 1985 |
| British Matchplay | 1982, 1983, 1986 |

Other achievements
- 1989 Appointed Member of the Order of the British Empire MBE
- Updated on 14 May 2024

Eric John Bristow (25 April 1957 – 5 April 2018) was an English professional darts player from Hackney in East London. Nicknamed "the Crafty Cockney", Bristow was one of the most iconic and successful players of the 1980s and is credited with helping to boost the sport's popularity during that era. He continues to be regarded as one of the best darts players of all time.

Bristow was a five-time BDO World Darts Champion, a five-time World Masters Champion, a four-time WDF World Cup singles champion and a double winner of the prestigious News of the World Darts Championship (one of only seven people to do so). He was ranked world number one on multiple occasions. He regularly featured on the ITV darts-themed game show Bullseye.

In late 1986, Bristow began experiencing dartitis, which affected his career thereafter. In 1993, he became involved in the split in darts as one of the 16 players who left the British Darts Organisation (BDO) to form the World Darts Council, which later became the Professional Darts Corporation (PDC). His last major achievement as a player was reaching the semi-finals of the 1997 WDC World Darts Championship, losing narrowly to his former protégé Phil Taylor.

Bristow was awarded an MBE in 1989 for his services to sport. After retiring from competitive play in 2007, he worked as a commentator and pundit on Sky Sports darts coverage. In April 2018, he suffered a heart attack while attending a Premier League Darts event in Liverpool and died at the age of 60.

== Early life ==
Bristow was born in the London Borough of Hackney in 1957, the only child of George Bristow, a plasterer, and his wife Pamela, a telephone operator. He grew up at 97 Milton Grove, Stoke Newington, attending Newington Green JM School before passing his eleven-plus exam and leaving for Hackney Downs Grammar School in 1968. There, he displayed an aptitude for mathematics but lacked discipline, receiving the cane on only his third day at the school (informing The Daily Mirror years later that this was "probably a record") before being expelled at the age of 14 for carrying a claw hammer. As a youth, he was involved in burglaries and car theft as a member of a local gang named the Hoxton Boys, before taking a job as a proofreader at an advertising agency.

== Career ==
Bristow began playing darts at the age of 11 when his father bought him his first dartboard. His father soon began taking him to nearby pubs so that he could compete against local players. By the time he was 15, Bristow was earning £120 per weekend playing darts, versus £12 a week at his proofreading job. He gave up his job to become a full-time darts player. In the early years Bristow and friend Bobby George took part in money races together in the pubs and clubs around London.

Bristow played regularly in tournaments throughout his teenage years. Shortly before turning 18, he was capped by England for the first time. Soon afterwards, Bristow visited an English pub in Santa Monica, California called the Crafty Cockney. Bristow began wearing a shirt he received from the same pub depicting a uniformed British policeman, a Union Flag and the title "Crafty Cockney," which became his nickname.

=== Peak years ===
Bristow emerged as the most successful and consistent darts player of the 1980s, reigning as number one in the world rankings during most of the period from 1980 until 1987. Television began showing increased interest in the sport in the late 1970s, with the first world championship occurring in 1978.

Bristow won his first world championship in 1980, defeating fellow Londoner Bobby George. Bristow retained his title in 1981 (over John Lowe) and won it again in 1984 (over Dave Whitcombe), 1985 (over Lowe) and 1986 (over Whitcombe). He also suffered a shock defeat in a final during the 1980s, when the relatively unknown Keith Deller beat him in the 1983 final; he had also lost to Steve Brennan in the previous year's first round. As well as his five world titles, Bristow also finished as runner-up on five occasions, the last in 1991.

As well as his world championship exploits, Bristow also lifted the prestigious Winmau World Masters crown five times (1977 beating Paul Reynolds, 1979 beating Canadian Allan Hogg, 1981 beating defending champion John Lowe, 1983 beating Mike Gregory and 1984 beating Keith Deller). He also reached the final in 1989, losing to Peter Evison.

Bristow was a winner of the World Cup Singles on four occasions (1983 beating Jocky Wilson, 1985 beating Tony Payne, 1987 beating Bob Sinnaeve and 1989 beating Jack McKenna) and won the News of the World Darts Championship in 1983 beating Ralph Flatt and 1984 beating Ian Robertson (becoming only the second man in 57 years to successfully defend that title) together with countless other major tournaments including the British Open and Swedish Open three times each and the North American Open on four occasions.

=== Dartitis ===
During the Swedish Open in November 1986, Bristow found himself unable to let go of his darts properly – a psychological condition known as dartitis, similar to the yips in golf. He was never quite the same player again, but did regain the number-one ranking briefly in late 1989 and early 1990 before losing his form again. He reached the semi-finals of the 1997 WDC World Darts Championship at the Circus Tavern, where he narrowly lost to Phil Taylor 4–5 in sets.

=== Mentoring Phil Taylor ===
In the 1980s, Bristow came across Phil Taylor, then a raw young darts talent in Stoke-on-Trent, and he sponsored him with about £10,000 to fund his development in the game, on the understanding that the money would be repaid. Taylor went on to usurp his mentor as the greatest darts player ever.

=== Later career and retirement ===
Bristow's form deteriorated in the early 1990s and he was dropped from the Merseyside team in 1992. Bristow had joined Merseyside, his third county, in 1988, after previously playing for London from 1976 to 1980 and for Staffordshire from 1980 to 1988. With Merseyside, Bristow played with his international teammate Kevin Kenny, and after being dropped by Merseyside, he was dropped from the England national side later the same year. The split within darts saw Bristow become a founding member of the Professional Darts Corporation.

At the World Matchplay event in Blackpool, Bristow made six appearances without winning a match. His swansong came in a classic semi-final at the 1997 PDC World Championship, which he lost to his protégé, Phil Taylor. Bristow's last appearance came at the World Championships in 2000, ending his 23-year run of playing in a world championship, after which, he stopped playing professionally after the event.

From late December 1993, until November 2016, when he was dismissed, he worked mainly as a spotter, a pundit and an occasional commentator for Sky Sports during televised PDC tournaments, while continuing to travel and play on the exhibition circuit. In 2004, Bristow played John Lowe, with Bristow showing glimpses of his old form in winning the match 6 legs to 1. Bristow returned to TV screens as a player in 2008 on Setanta Sports to compete in the BetFred League of Legends tournament, beating Bobby George 7–5 in the opening match. Bristow failed to maintain his form, however, and did not win another match in the tournament, failing to qualify for the semi-finals and finishing bottom of the League of Legends table.

=== Rivalries ===
==== John Lowe ====
John Lowe played Bristow many times in televised tournaments, often in finals. Bristow said "Lowey has the perfect throw and he is a steady rather than spectacular player, but all I had to do was play my normal game and I'd beat him every time because he can't go up a gear. He couldn't raise his game like I could, or Jocky for that matter. However, I also knew that if I was off my game he'd grind me down and win by simply hitting ton, ton, ton, ton and just being consistent with his throwing", said Bristow in his autobiography. Lowe talked about Bristow (in Lowe's autobiography) "I've been friends with him, I've fallen out with him and I've celebrated on more than one occasion with him. Indeed, my own darting career wouldn't have been the same without him. Eric Bristow, MBE, is simply one of the greats". Lowe also admitted he would have won a lot more world titles if Bristow hadn't come along.

==== Jocky Wilson ====
Bristow's rivalry with Jocky Wilson was sometimes volatile. Just before walking onto the stage for a World Cup match in Edinburgh in 1983, Wilson kicked Bristow, as Bristow recalled in his autobiography. "We were both standing at the back of the stage waiting to go on, the TV cameras were running and everything was set. Then the announcer said 'representing England we have Eric Bristow'. Just as I was about to go on stage and give the booing crowd some gyp Jocky took a run at me and kicked me as hard as he could in the shin. He took about two inches of skin off". Bristow responded saying "I grabbed him by the throat and I was going to kill him, but five officials managed to prise me off". Blood was dripping down his leg but Bristow said he proceeded to beat him easily "I had to after what he did to me. I was fuming all the way through the game. When it was all over he put his arm round me and, with a smile on his face, said 'I've got to try to beat you somehow'. I couldn't do anything but laugh. One minute I wanted to tear him apart, the next we were at the bar having a drink". Bristow said "deep down, I think he liked me, and I had a soft spot for him".

== Personal life ==
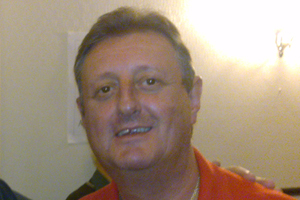
Bristow in 2009

From 1978 to 1987, Bristow was in a relationship with former darts player Maureen Flowers, moving from London to live with her in Staffordshire. In 1989, he married Jane Higginbotham (born 1962). They had two children, a daughter and a son. They divorced in 2005 after 16 years of marriage and he was later in a relationship with Rebecca Gadd until his death.

Away from sport, Bristow had a passion for stamp collecting. Although he confessed in an interview with The Guardian to neither reading books nor watching television, he did regularly complete The Times crossword, often timing himself while doing so prior to a big match.

In 2012, Bristow participated in the reality show I'm a Celebrity...Get Me Out of Here! He was voted out on 29 November 2012, finishing fourth out of 12 celebrities.

Bristow was awarded the MBE in 1989 for his services to sport.

In 2005, Bristow was accused of assaulting his wife. North Staffordshire magistrates ordered him to stay away from the family home in Milltown Way, Leek, Staffordshire and he was remanded on conditional bail. Bristow was alleged to have punched her in the face during a drunken row in their bedroom on 29 April 2005. He was subsequently cleared of the charges.

On 29 November 2016, Bristow was sacked by Sky Sports following a series of tweets in which he responded to the United Kingdom football sexual abuse scandal centred around the football coach and convicted child sex offender, Barry Bennell. Bristow suggested the victims should have "sorted out" the perpetrators when they were older. According to him, "Dart players tough guys footballers wimps". Bristow was condemned by some social media users, including alleged victims of Bennell, for his comments. Bristow apologised for his comments the following day. In a statement, he compared himself to a "bull in a China shop" and "appreciated my wording was wrong and offended many people".

== Death ==
Bristow died on 5 April 2018 after a heart attack while attending a Premier League Darts event at the Echo Arena in Liverpool. Bristow had finished playing some VIPs at a promotional event and was walking back to his car when he collapsed and was rushed to hospital.

Speaking to BBC Radio 2, Bobby George said: "In the afternoon, I was doing a show at a pub opposite the Premier League (darts) building and he just came in, said 'hello' and had a pint, then said 'see ya'. I said 'see ya' because I was working ... he went across the road, and two-and-a-half hours later, he was gone". On learning of Bristow's death, PDC chairman Barry Hearn said "We often talk about the absence of characters in sport but Eric Bristow was a character with a capital 'c'. He was very much a man of the people. He understood what crowds wanted to see - he was controversial, he was a maverick, he spoke his mind and upset a few people from time to time, but the man in the street warmed to him because he was very much one of theirs".

== World Championship results ==
=== BDO ===
Bristow's World Championship results are as follows:

- 1978: 1st round (lost to Conrad Daniels 3–6 legs)
- 1979: Quarter-finals (lost to Alan Evans 1–3 sets)
- 1980: Winner (beat Bobby George 5–3)
- 1981: Winner (beat John Lowe 5–3)
- 1982: 1st round (lost to Steve Brennan 0–2)
- 1983: Runner-up (lost to Keith Deller 5–6)
- 1984: Winner (beat Dave Whitcombe 7–1)
- 1985: Winner (beat John Lowe 6–2)
- 1986: Winner (beat Dave Whitcombe 6–0)
- 1987: Runner-up (lost to John Lowe 4–6)
- 1988: Semi-finals (lost to John Lowe 2–5)
- 1989: Runner-up (lost to Jocky Wilson 4–6)
- 1990: Runner-up (lost to Phil Taylor 1–6)
- 1991: Runner-up (lost to Dennis Priestley 0–6)
- 1992: 2nd round (lost to Martin Phillips 2–3)
- 1993: 2nd round (lost to Bob Anderson 0–3)

=== PDC ===
Bristow's PDC results are as follows:

- 1994: Group Stage (lost to Rod Harrington 1–3 & beat Sean Downs 3–2)
- 1995: Group Stage (lost to Rod Harrington 0–3 & lost to Shayne Burgess 0–3)
- 1996: Group Stage (lost to Dennis Priestley 0–3 & beat Richie Gardner 3–2)
- 1997: Semi-finals (lost to Phil Taylor 4–5 & lost 3rd Place Match to Peter Evison 2–4)
- 1998: Group Stage (lost to Dennis Priestley 0–3 & lost to Steve Raw 0–3)
- 1999: 1st round (lost to Peter Manley 0–3)
- 2000: 1st round (lost to Steve Brown 2–3)

== Career finals ==
=== BDO and WDF ===
Bristow appeared in BDO and WDF major finals 31 times with a record of 22 wins and 9 runners-up.

Legend
World Championship (5–5)
World Masters (5–1)
British Professional (2–0)
World Matchplay (2–0)
Grand Masters (5–1)
British Matchplay (3–2)

| Outcome | No. | Year | Championship | Opponent in the final | Score (Note: (l) = score in legs, (s) = score in sets.) |
|---|---|---|---|---|---|
| Runner-up | 1. | 1977 | British Matchplay (1) | (Scotland) Rab Smith | 2–3 (s) |
| Winner | 1. | 1977 | Winmau World Masters (1) | (England) Paul Reynolds | 3–1 (s) |
| Runner-up | 2. | 1977 | Butlins Grand Masters(1) | (England) John Lowe | 4–5 (l) |
| Winner | 2. | 1979 | Winmau World Masters (1) | (Canada) Allan Hogg | 2–0 (s) |
| Winner | 3. | 1980 | World Darts Championship (1) | (England) Bobby George | 5–3 (s) |
| Winner | 4. | 1981 | World Darts Championship (2) | (England) John Lowe | 5–3 (s) |
| Winner | 5. | 1981 | Butlins Grand Masters (1) | (England) John Lowe | Unknown |
| Winner | 6. | 1981 | Winmau World Masters (3) | (England) John Lowe | 2–1 (s) |
| Winner | 7. | 1982 | British Matchplay (1) | (England) Dave Whitcombe | 2–0 (s) |
| Winner | 8. | 1982 | Butlins Grand Masters (2) | (England) Cliff Lazarenko | 4–3 (l) |
| Winner | 9. | 1982 | British Professional Championship (1) | (England) John Lowe | 7–3 (s) |
| Runner-up | 3. | 1983 | World Darts Championship (1) | (England) Keith Deller | 5–6 (s) |
| Winner | 10. | 1983 | British Matchplay (2) | (England) Keith Deller | 3–2 (s) |
| Winner | 11. | 1983 | Butlins Grand Masters (3) | (Scotland) Jocky Wilson | 5–1 (l) |
| Winner | 12. | 1983 | Winmau World Masters (4) | (England) Mike Gregory | 2–1 (s) |
| Winner | 13. | 1984 | World Darts Championship (3) | (England) Dave Whitcombe | 7–1 (s) |
| Winner | 14. | 1984 | Winmau World Masters (5) | (England) Keith Deller | 3–1 (s) |
| Winner | 15. | 1985 | World Darts Championship (4) | (England) John Lowe | 6–2 (s) |
| Winner | 16. | 1985 | Butlins Grand Masters (4) | (Australia) Terry O'Dea | 5–3 (l) |
| Winner | 17. | 1985 | MFI World Matchplay (1) | (England) Bob Anderson | 5–4 (s) |
| Winner | 18. | 1985 | British Professional Championship (2) | (England) John Lowe | 7–4 (s) |
| Winner | 19. | 1986 | World Darts Championship (5) | (England) Dave Whitcombe | 6–0 (s) |
| Winner | 20. | 1986 | British Matchplay (3) | (England) Dave Whitcombe | 3–1 (s) |
| Winner | 21. | 1986 | Butlins Grand Masters (5) | (Canada) Bob Sinnaeve | 5–3 (l) |
| Runner-up | 4. | 1987 | World Darts Championship (2) | (England) John Lowe | 4–6 (s) |
| Runner-up | 5. | 1987 | British Matchplay (2) | (England) Dave Whitcombe | 0–3 (s) |
| Winner | 22. | 1988 | MFI World Matchplay (2) | (Canada) Bob Sinnaeve | 5–1 (s) |
| Runner-up | 6. | 1989 | World Darts Championship (3) | (Scotland) Jocky Wilson | 4–6 (s) |
| Runner-up | 7. | 1989 | Winmau World Masters (1) | (England) Peter Evison | 2–3 (s) |
| Runner-up | 8. | 1990 | World Darts Championship (4) | (England) Phil Taylor | 1–6 (s) |
| Runner-up | 9. | 1991 | World Darts Championship (5) | (England) Dennis Priestley | 0–6 (s) |

=== WDF ===
Bristow appeared in WDF major finals 6 times with 4 titles and 2 runners-up.

Legend
World Cup (4–0)
Europe Cup (0–2)

| Outcome | No. | Year | Championship | Opponent in the final | Score |
|---|---|---|---|---|---|
| Runner-up | 1. | 1980 | Europe Cup Singles (1) | (England) Tony Brown | 0–4 (l) |
| Runner-up | 2. | 1982 | Europe Cup Singles (2) | (England) Bobby George | 1–4 (l) |
| Winner | 1. | 1983 | World Cup Singles (1) | (Scotland) Jocky Wilson | 4–2 (l) |
| Winner | 2. | 1985 | World Cup Singles (2) | (United States) Tony Payne | 4–2 (l) |
| Winner | 3. | 1987 | World Cup Singles (3) | (Canada) Bob Sinnaeve | 4–1 (l) |
| Winner | 4. | 1989 | World Cup Singles (4) | (Republic of Ireland) Jack McKenna | 4–1 (l) |

=== Independent major finals ===
Bristow appeared in independent major finals 2 times and won 2 titles.

| Outcome | No. | Year | Championship | Opponent in the final | Score |
|---|---|---|---|---|---|
| Winner | 1. | 1983 | News of the World Championship (1) | (England) Ralph Flatt | 2–0 (l) |
| Winner | 2. | 1984 | News of the World Championship (2) | (England) Ian Robertson | 2–0 (l) |

== Performance timeline ==
Bristow's performance timeline is as follows: CH= County Heats, CF= County Finals, DF= Divisional Finals

=== BDO ===
| Tournament | 1977 | 1978 | 1979 | 1980 | 1981 | 1982 | 1983 | 1984 | 1985 | 1986 | 1987 | 1988 | 1989 | 1990 | 1991 | 1992 | 1993 |
|---|---|---|---|---|---|---|---|---|---|---|---|---|---|---|---|---|---|
| BDO World Championship | NYF | 1R | QF | W | W | 1R | F | W | W | W | F | SF | F | F | F | 2R | 2R |
| World Masters | W | 3R | W | QF | W | QF | W | W | 4R | 4R | SF | QF | F | 4R | 4R | 4R | DNP |
| British Matchplay | F | SF | QF | SF | SF | W | W | SF | SF | W | F | SF | QF | QF | QF | DNP | |
| British Professional Championship | Not held | | | | 2R | W | SF | SF | W | 2R | 1R | 1R | Not held | | | | |
| Butlins Grand Masters | F | QF | 1R | 1R | W | W | W | SF | W | W | Not held | | | | | | |
| MFI World Matchplay | Not held | | | | | | | 1R | W | 1R | QF | W | Not held | | | | |
| News of the World Darts Championship | ??? | | DF | ??? | CF | ??? | W | W | CF | ??? | DF | ??? | CH | CF | Not held | | |

WDF majors performances
| Tournament | Event | World Cup 1977 | Euro Cup 1978 | World Cup 1979 | Euro Cup 1980 | World Cup 1981 | Euro Cup 1982 | World Cup 1983 | Euro Cup 1984 | World Cup 1985 | Euro Cup 1986 | World Cup 1987 | Euro Cup 1988 | World Cup 1989 | Euro Cup 1990 | World Cup 1991 |
|---|---|---|---|---|---|---|---|---|---|---|---|---|---|---|---|---|
| WDF World Cup & WDF Europe Cup | Singles | QF | L16 | QF | RU | QF | RU | W | QF | W | SF | W | SF | W | QF | QF |
| WDF World Cup & WDF Europe Cup | Pairs | W | W | W | L16 | RU | L16 | W | L16 | W | W | W | QF | W | RU | L16 |
| WDF World Cup & WDF Europe Cup | Team | RU | SF | W | W | W | W | W | W | SF | W | W | SF | SF | W | W |
| WDF World Cup & WDF Europe Cup | Overall | RU | W | W | W | W | W | W | W | W | W | W | W | W | W | W |

=== PDC ===
| Tournament | 1994 | 1995 | 1996 | 1997 | 1998 | 1999 | 2000 |
|---|---|---|---|---|---|---|---|
| PDC World Championship | RR | RR | RR | SF | RR | 1R | 1R |
| World Matchplay | 1R | 1R | 1R | 1R | 1R | 1R | DNP |

Performance Table Legend
| W | Won the tournament | RU | Runner-up | SF | Semifinalist | QF | Quarterfinalist | #R; RR; L# | Lost in # round Round-robin; Last # stage | DQ | Disqualified |
| DNQ | Did not qualify | DNP | Did not participate | WD | Withdrew | NH | Tournament not held | #R; RR; L# | Lost in # round Round-robin; Last # stage | NYF | Not yet founded |

== High averages ==
Eric Bristow televised high averages
| Average | Date | Opponent | Tournament | Stage | Score | Ref. |
|---|---|---|---|---|---|---|
| 105.30 | 17 September 1983 | (England) Alan Glazier | British Professional Championship | Last 32 | 3–0 (S) | |
| 103.24 | 22 October 1983 | (Scotland) Jocky Wilson | World Cup | Final | 4–2 (L) | |
| 101.16 | 8 December 1984 | (England) Keith Deller | Winmau World Masters | Final | 3–1 (S) | |
| 99.66 | 11 January 1985 | (England) Dave Whitcombe | World Darts Championship | Semi-finals | 5–2 (S) | |

Records
| Preceded by Bobby George | World record highest televised average 17 September 1983 – 5 December 1991 | Succeeded by Phil Taylor |
