= List of darts players who have switched organisation =

Between 1993 and 2020 professional darts had two rival bodies which staged tournaments and had separate pools of players, the British Darts Organisation (BDO) and the Professional Darts Corporation (PDC). Both staged its own world championship. In practice, players had to choose which organisation to represent, but many switched between the two, which often caused controversy.

This situation arose following an acrimonious split in the early 1990s between the leading players and the BDO. Darts had boomed in popularity during the 1980s, with as many as 23 televised events in 1983. However, by the end of the decade this had fallen to just one. This, combined with general disillusionment at the BDO's management of the sport, prompted 16 top players to break away and form their own body. Four years of legal action followed, culminating in the 1997 Tomlin order, which confirmed the existence of both bodies, and established that players were free choose which one to play for.

This list documents the players who made the decision to switch from one organisation to the other. In general more players switched from the BDO to the PDC than vice versa, attracted by the greater prize money and better competition offered by the PDC. The BDO folded in 2020, but many of their events were subsequently revived by the World Darts Federation, so the split in darts remains.

== World Darts Council foundation ==
The sixteen darts defectors who formed the WDC were as follows:

Player	Time with BDO	Notes
(England) Phil Taylor	1988–1993	Remained a PDC player until his retirement in 2018.
(England) Dennis Priestley	1989–1993	Remained a PDC player until his retirement in 2014.
(England) Rod Harrington	1987–1993	Remained a PDC player until his retirement in 2007.
(England) Alan Warriner	1985–1993	Remained a PDC player until his retirement in 2009.
(England) Peter Evison	1986–1993	Quit the PDC in 2008 to rejoin the BDO. Returned to the PDC in 2011 and retired from darts in 2018.
(England) Ritchie Gardner	1984–1993	Remained a PDC player until his retirement in 2006.
(Scotland) Jocky Wilson	1979–1993	Remained a PDC player until his retirement in 1996.
(England) Eric Bristow	1979–1993	Remained a PDC player until his retirement in 2007.
(England) Keith Deller	1983–1993	Remained a PDC player until his retirement in 2007.
(England) John Lowe	1975–1993	Remained a PDC player until his retirement in 2007.
(England) Bob Anderson	1979–1993	Remained a PDC player until his retirement in 2008.
(England) Cliff Lazarenko	1977–1993	Remained a PDC player until his retirement in 2007.
(England) Kevin Spiolek	1987–1993	Remained a PDC player until his retirement in 2007.
(Scotland) Jamie Harvey	1988–1993	Quit the PDC in 2009 due to ill-health but returned to the BDO in 2011. Retired in 2013.
(England) Mike Gregory	1983–1992	Quit the PDC in 1993 to return to the BDO. Retired from darts in 2005.
(Wales) Chris Johns	1986–1993	Quit the PDC in 1993 and retired from professional darts the same year.

Since then, many darts players have left the BDO to join the PDC, although some players rejoined the BDO either from finding it difficult on the PDC circuit or lack of sponsorship. The PDC had new talent of their own. However some players left them to join the BDO.

== Players who transferred from the BDO to the PDC ==
Year of transfer	Player	Time with BDO	Notes
1993	(Republic of Ireland) Tom Kirby	1987–1993	Quit the PDC in 2007. Died in 2008
1994	(England) Mick Manning	1988–1994	Quit the PDC in 2005
1994	(United States) Larry Butler	1992–1993	Quit the PDC in 1997 but rejoined them in 2007. Quit in 2011 and is now with the BDO
1994	(United States) (Singapore) Paul Lim	1980–1994	
1994	(England) Dennis Smith	1993–1994	
1994	(England) Graeme Stoddart	1990	Quit the PDC in 2009
1994	(England) Dennis Hickling	1980–1994	Quit the PDC in 1996
1994	(United States) Tony Payne	1985–1994	Quit the PDC in 1995 but rejoined them in 2003. Quit in 2007
1994	(United States) Jerry Umberger	1981–1993	Quit the PDC in 1997
1994	(United States) Gerald Verrier	1987–1993	Quit the PDC in 2000
1994	(United States) Sean Downs	1993	Quit the PDC in 2010
1994	(United States) Whit Whitley	1993	Quit the PDC in 1995
1994	(England) Damien Tonge	1993–1994	Quit the PDC in 1995
1994	(England) Gary Stevens	1993	Quit the PDC in 2009
1994	(United States) Jim Watkins	1993	Quit the PDC in 1995
1994	(England) Robert Earle	1987	Quit the PDC in 1995
1994	(United States) Jim Widmayer	1993	Quit the PDC in 2007 to rejoin BDO in 2008
1994	(United States) Dave Kelly	1991–1993	Quit the PDC in 1996 but rejoined them in 2006. Quit in 2008
1994	(England) Kevin Burrows	1989–1994	Quit the PDC in 2004
1994	(England) Shayne Burgess	1989–1994	Quit the PDC in 2008 to rejoin BDO in 2012. Quit in 2014
1994	(England) Steve Raw	1993	Quit the PDC in 2001
1995	(United States) Gary Mawson	1994	Quit the PDC in 2001 but rejoined them in 2004.
1995	(England) John Russell	1994	Quit the PDC in 1996
1995	(England) Reg Harding	1988–1993	Quit the PDC in 2006
1995	(England) Steve Tingay	1994	Quit the PDC in 1996
1995	(England) Nigel Justice	1991	Quit the PDC in 2003
1995	(England) Kevin Kenny	1987–1994	Quit the PDC in 2001
1995	(Belgium) Jef Scheyltjens	1994	Quit the PDC in 1995
1995	(England) Paul Bratherton	1994	Quit the PDC in 1997
1995	(England) Darren Peetoom	1995	Quit the PDC in 1997 to rejoin the BDO in 2015
1996	(Canada) Tony Holyoake	1980–1995	Quit the PDC in 1997
1996	(England) Phil Gilman	1992	Quit the PDC in 2006
1996	(United States) Bruce Robbins	1995	Quit the PDC in 2008
1996	(England) Peter Manley	1995–1996	Quit the PDC in 2017
1996	(England) Harry Robinson	1990–1996	
1996	(England) Mark Sherwood	1994–1995	Quit the PDC in 1997
1996	(Belgium) Johnny Deley	1987–1990	Quit the PDC in 1996
1996	(England) Paul Cook	1990	Quit the PDC in 2017
1996	(Canada) Avtar Gill	1981–1987	Quit the PDC in 1997
1996	(Netherlands) Frans Harmsen	1995	Quit the PDC in 2000 to rejoin BDO in 2002. Quit the 2017
1996	(England) Jack North	1975–1976	Quit the PDC in 2004
1996	(England) Fran Lynch	1994–1996	Quit the PDC in 1997
1996	(England) Joe Holmes	1995	Quit the PDC in 1997
1996	(United States) Jason Lucas	1995–1996	Quit the PDC in 1997
1996	(England) John Moore	1974	Quit the PDC in 1997
1996	(England) Garry Haynes	1995	Quit the PDC in 1997
1997	(Scotland) David McFadden	1986–1996	Quit the PDC in 2000. Died in 2021
1997	(Canada) John Part	1991–1997	Also a pundit for Sky Sports Darts
1997	(Scotland) Drew O'Neill	1986	Quit the PDC in 1998
1997	(England) Dean Allsop	1995–1997	Quit the PDC in 2010 to rejoin the BDO in 2011
1997	(England) Chris Whiting	1986–1994	Quit the PDC in 1997
1997	(England) Mark Robinson	1995–1997	Quit the PDC in 2015
1997	(Canada) Carl Mercer	1993–1997	Quit the PDC in 2004 to rejoin the BDO in 2006. Quit the 2009
1997	(Wales) Anthony Ridler	1977–1983	Quit the PDC in 2006. Died in 2014
1997	(Wales) Alan Evans	1975–1988	Quit the PDC in 1997. Died in 1999
1998	(England) John Ferrell	1994–1997	Quit the PDC in 2017
1998	(United States) Dan Lauby	1996–1998	
1998	(Canada) Scott Cummings	1997–1998	Quit the PDC in 2001
1998	(England) Alex Roy	1998	Quit the PDC in 2018
1999	(Wales) Richie Burnett	1987–1999	Quit the PDC in 2014 but rejoined them in 2016
1999	(Netherlands) Roland Scholten	1989–1999	Quit the PDC in 2014 and is now a pundit for RTL7 Darts
1999	(England) Colin Lloyd	1998	Quit the PDC in 2015 but rejoined them in 2018. Quit in 2018
1999	(United States) Darin Young	1998	Quit the PDC in 2014 to rejoin BDO in 2014
2000	(Spain) Braulio Roncero	1994–1998	Quit the PDC in 2010. Died in 2018
2000	(England) Dave Askew	1988–2000	Quit the PDC in 2011
2000	(United States) Roger Carter	1996–1999	Quit the PDC in 2012
2000	(England) Denis Ovens	1986–2000	Quit the PDC in 2015
2000	(England) Les Fitton	1998–2000	Quit the PDC in 2004
2001	(England) Norman Fletcher	1999–2001	Quit the PDC in 2013
2001	(England) Ronnie Baxter	1988–2001	
2001	(England) Steve Beaton	1990–2001	
2001	(England) Andy Jenkins	1994–2001	
2001	(England) Kevin Painter	1994–2001	
2001	(England) Chris Mason	1990–2001	Quit the PDC in 2014 and is now a commentator for ITV Sports Darts rejoined the BDO in 2015. Quit in 2016
2001	(England) Paul Williams	1993–2001	Quit the PDC in 2007
2001	(England) Robbie Widdows	1987–2001	Quit the PDC in 2006
2001	(England) Lionel Sams	1994–2001	Quit the PDC in 2011 but rejoined them in 2013. Quit in 2015
2002	(England) Matt Chapman	1999–2001	Quit the PDC in 2006
2002	(England) Mark Holden	1990–2001	Quit the PDC in 2007
2002	(England) Paul Whitworth	1990–2001	
2002	(England) Ian Brand	1994–1997	Quit the PDC in 2007
2002	(Wales) Barrie Bates	2001	
2002	(England) Mark Dudbridge	2002	
2002	(Netherlands) Arjan Moen	2000–2002	Quit the PDC in 2003 the rejoin BDO in 2005. Quit in 2010
2002	(England) Aaron Turner	2000-2002	Quit the PDC in 2015 to rejoin BDO in 2016.
2002	(Jamaica) Al Hedman	1995–2001	Quit the PDC in 2005
2002	(England) Mick Savvery	1985–2002	Quit the PDC in 2016
2002	(England) Lee Palfreyman	1995–2001	
2002	(England) Wayne Jones	1988–2002	
2002	(Republic of Ireland) Jack McKenna	1974–2002	Quit the PDC in 2005 the rejoin BDO in 2006. Quit in 2007
2002	(Northern Ireland) John MaGowan	1994–2001	Quit the PDC in 2012 to rejoin BDO in 2012. Quit in 2016
2002	(Australia) Brian Roach	1998	Quit the PDC in 2017
2002	(England) Wayne Mardle	1993–2002	Quit the PDC in 2012 and is now a commentator for Sky Sports Darts
2002	(England) Les Hodkinson	1997–2002	Quit the PDC in 2004
2002	(England) Crissy Manley	1997–2002	Quit the PDC in 2004 to rejoin BDO in 2005. Quit the 2011.
2002	(England) Dave Smith	2001	Quit the PDC in 2012 to rejoin BDO in 2013. Quit the 2015
2003	(England) Dave Jowett	1996–1997	Quit the PDC in 2008
2003	(Australia) David Platt	2002	Quit the PDC in 2010 to rejoin BDO in 2011
2003	(United States) Ray Carver	2002	Quit the PDC in 2010 to rejoin BDO in 2011. Quit in 2015. but rejoined them in 2018
2003	(Northern Ireland) Ray Farrell	1985–1993	Quit the PDC in 2009 to rejoin BDO in 2012. Quit in 2014
2003	(England) Vic Hubbard	1985–1986	Quit the PDC in 2006
2003	(Wales) Marshall James	1991–1999	Quit the PDC in 2003
2003	(England) Andy Smith	1997–2002	
2003	(England) Simon Whatley	2002	Quit the PDC in 2008 to rejoin BDO in 2010. Quit in 2011
2003	(Canada) Gerry Convery	2001–2003	Quit the PDC in 2011
2003	(Northern Ireland) Colin McGarry	1995	Quit the PDC in 2014 to rejoin BDO in 2014. Quit in 2017
2003	(England) Vijay Kumar	1989–2002	Quit the PDC in 2004
2003	(Northern Ireland) Geoff Wylie	1991–2003	Quit the PDC in 2009 to rejoin BDO in 2013. Quit the 2015
2004	(England) Matt Clark	1996–2004	
2004	(Belgium) Erik Clarys	1989–2004	Quit the PDC in 2006
2004	(United States) Bruce Cottrell	2003	Quit the PDC in 2017
2004	(Canada) Norm Tremblay	2002–2003	Quit the PDC in 2007 to rejoin BDO in 2010. Quit in 2017
2004	(United States) Ricky Villanueva	2004	Quit the PDC in 2011
2004	(England) Colin Monk	1993–2004	Quit the PDC in 2011
2004	(England) James Wade	2001–2004	
2004	(Canada) Ron Miller	2004	Quit the PDC in 2013
2004	(England) Dave Whitcombe	1979–1992	Quit the PDC in 2007.
2004	(Scotland) Peter Wright	1995–2004	
2004	(United States) George Walls	2003	Quit the PDC in 2007
2004	(United States) Ed de Behnke	2004	Quit the PDC in 2017
2005	(England) Mark Frost	2004	
2005	(England) Steve Gittins	1985–1990	Quit the PDC in 2005
2005	(Germany) Tomas Seyler	1998–2004	
2005	(Australia) Russell Stewart	1983–2005	Quit the PDC in 2016
2005	(England) Alan Tabern	2004	
2006	(Netherlands) Raymond van Barneveld	1987–2006	
2006	(United States) David DePriest	2006	Quit the PDC in 2017
2006	(United States) John Kuczynski	2000–2005	Quit the PDC in 2012
2006	(United States) Bill Davis	2001–2004	Quit the PDC in 2012
2006	(United States) Brad Wethington	1998	Quit the PDC in 2015
2006	(Denmark) Jann Hoffmann	1989–2004	Quit the PDC in 2016
2006	(Wales) Peter Locke	1983–1992	Quit the PDC in 2006
2006	(South Africa) Charles Losper	2003–2006	Quit the PDC in 2015
2006	(Republic of Ireland) Shane O'Connor	2006	
2006	(Canada) Brian Cyr	1998–2006	Quit the PDC in 2008 to rejoin BDO in 2011
2006	(Germany) Michael Rosenauer	1991–2006	Quit the PDC in 2016 to rejoin BDO in 2017
2006	(England) Kirk Shepherd	2003–2006	
2007	(England) Jamie Caven	1992–2007	
2007	(Netherlands) Michael van Gerwen	2003–2007	
2007	(England) Stuart Holden	1983	Quit the PDC in 2015
2007	(England) Mervyn King	1994–2007	
2007	(Netherlands) Jelle Klaasen	2003–2007	
2007	(England) Dave Ladley	1992–2005	
2007	(Denmark) Per Laursen	1987–2007	
2007	(Spain) Carlos Rodriguez	2006–2007	
2007	(Austria) Mensur Suljović	1999–2005	
2007	(Netherlands) Vincent van der Voort	2001–2007	
2007	(Canada) Rory Orvis	1998–2007	Quit the PDC in 2013
2007	(Canada) Dan Olson	1990–2007	Quit the PDC in 2011
2008	(Philippines) Rizal Barellano	2006	Quit the PDC in 2009
2008	(United States) Sammy Cruz	1990–1992	Quit the PDC in 2017
2008	(Hungary) Nándor Bezzeg	2000–2008	
2008	(Austria) Dietmar Burger	2002–2007	
2008	(Finland) Marko Kantele	1996–2008	
2008	(Canada) Ken MacNeil	2005–2008	
2008	(Czech Republic) Miloslav Navrátil	2005–2007	Quit the PDC in 2008
2008	(Republic of Ireland) Aodhagan O'Neill	2003–2008	Quit the PDC in 2012
2008	(India) Ashfaque Sayed	2005–2006	Quit the PDC in 2015
2008	(Canada) Bob Sinnaeve	1980–1992	Quit the PDC in 2010 to rejoin BDO in 2010
2008	(Scotland) Robert Thornton	2002–2008	
2009	(Scotland) Gary Anderson	2000–2009	
2009	(Sweden) Magnus Caris	1987–2009	
2009	(England) Andy Fordham	1994–2009	Quit the PDC in 2011 to rejoin the BDO in 2013
2009	(Finland) Jarkko Komula	1998–2009	Quit the PDC in 2015
2009	(Wales) Mark Webster	2006–2009	
2010	(Spain) Antonio Alcinas	2005–2009	
2010	(United States) Stacy Bromberg	1995–2010	Quit the PDC in 2012. Died in 2017
2010	(England) Steve Farmer	2004–2010	Quit the PDC in 2013
2010	(Netherlands) Mareno Michels	2004–2010	
2010	(Poland) Krzysztof Ratajski	2007–2010	
2010	(England) Tricia Wright	2000–2010	Joined the PDC in 2005 Still plays in the BDO since 2013
2010	(England) Ian White	2005–2010	
2011	(England) Dave Chisnall	2004–2011	
2011	(England) Brian Woods	2003–2011	
2011	(Belgium) Kurt van de Rijck	2002–2011	Quit the PDC in 2014 to rejoin BDO in 2014
2012	(England) Tony West	2002–2012	Quit the PDC in 2016
2012	(England) Steve West	2004–2012	
2012	(England) Stuart Kellett	2006–2012	
2012	(England) Ted Hankey	1994–2012	Quit the PDC in 2013 to rejoin the BDO in 2014
2012	(England) Dean Winstanley	2008–2012	Quit the PDC in 2016 but rejoined them in 2018
2012	(Scotland) Les Wallace	1995–2003	Quit the PDC in 2013
2013	(Australia) Wayne Weening	1988–2012	Quit the PDC in 2015
2014	(Netherlands) Christian Kist	2009–2014	
2014	(England) Stephen Bunting	2002–2014	
2015	(England) Alan Norris	2006–2015	
2015	(England) James Wilson	2007–2015	
2015	(Netherlands) Jan Dekker	2008–2015	
2016	(Netherlands) Jeffrey de Graaf	2010–2016	
2017	(Latvia) Madars Razma	2009–2017	
2017	(Netherlands) Jimmy Hendriks	2010–2017	
2017	(Poland) Krzysztof Ratajski	2007–2017	
2018	(Scotland) Cameron Menzies	2006–2018	
2018	(Netherlands) Danny Noppert	2012–2018	
2018	(Belgium) Davy Van Baelen	2016–2018	
2018	(England) Darryl Fitton	2002–2018	Quit the PDC in 2018
2018	(Sweden) Dennis Nilsson	2006–2018	
2018	(England) Tony O'Shea	1995–2018	Quit the PDC in 2018
2018	(England) Martin Atkins	2002–2018	Quit the PDC in 2018
2018	(England) Jamie Hughes	2013–2018	
2018	(England) Ryan Joyce	2007–2018	
2018	(Australia) Eddy Sims	2005–2018	
2019	(Belgium) Geert De Vos	2004–2019	
2019	(Belgium) Andy Baetens	2010–2019	
2019	(Lithuania) Darius Labanauskas	2006–2019	
2019	(England) Glen Durrant	2004–2019	
2019	(England) Mark McGeeney	2010–2019	
2019	(England) Scott Waites	2004–2019	
2019	(Wales) Jim Williams	2012–2019	
2019	(England) Daniel Day	2016–2019	
2019	(Northern Ireland) Kyle McKinstry	2014–2019	
2019	(England) Conan Whitehead	2016–2019	
2019	(Wales) Dean Reynolds	2015–2019	
2019	(England) Scott Baker	2016–2019	
2019	(Philippines) Ronald L. Briones	2006–2019	Quit the PDC in 2020

== BDO darts players who joined the PDC before returning ==
Year of transfer	Player	Time with BDO	Time with PDC	Notes
2004	(United States) Steve Brown	1976–1991	1993–2004	
2007	(Wales) Steve Alker	1998–2005	2005–2007	
2007	(England) Steve Coote	1994–2004	2004–2007	
2007	(Wales) Mark Salmon	1994–2005	2005–2006	Quit the BDO in 2017
2008	(England) Peter Evison	1986–1993	1993–2008	Was one of the 16 WDC defectors. Quit in 2018.
2009	(England) Deta Hedman	1990–1997	2002–2005	
2009	(Austria) Anton Pein	2003–2007	2007–2009	
2010	(Netherlands) Remco van Eijden	2004–2008	2008–2010	
2010	(Scotland) Chris Loudon	1998–2009	2009–2010	Quit the BDO in 2018 rejoined the PDC in 2018.
2010	(Netherlands) Jan van der Rassel	2002–2003	2004–2009	Quit the PDC in 2010.
2011	(Russia) Anastasia Dobromyslova	2004–2008	2008–2011	
2012	(England) Tony Eccles	2002–2007	2007–2011	Quit the PDC in 2011 rejoined the BDO in 2012. Quit in 2014.
2013	(England) Andy Fordham	1990–2008	2009–2011	Rejoined the BDO in 2013.
2014	(Netherlands) Co Stompé	1994–2008	2008–2013	Rejoined the PDC in 2018.
2014	(England) Ted Hankey	1995–2012	2012–2014	Rejoined the BDO in 2014.
2014	(Canada) Jeff Smith	2008–2011	2011–2013	Rejoined the PDC in 2018.

== PDC darts players who joined the BDO before returning ==
Year of transfer	Player	Time with PDC	Time with BDO	Ref
2009	(Australia) Simon Whitlock	2002–2003	2004–2009	
2011	(Scotland) John Henderson	2002–2003	2004–2011	
2012	(Netherlands) Toon Greebe	2008–2010	2006–2008, 2010–2012	
2015	(England) Robbie Green	2003–2007	2008–2015	
2018	(Canada) Jeff Smith	2011–2013	2002–2011, 2014–2017	
2020	(England) Andy Hamilton	2004–2018	2018–2020	
2020	(England) Wes Newton	2002–2018	2018–2020	
