= 1995 WDC World Darts Championship =

Tournament information
- Dates: 27 December 1994 – 2 January 1995
- Venue: Circus Tavern
- Location: Purfleet
- Country: England
- Organisation(s): PDC (WDC)
- Format: Sets; Final – best of 11
- Prize fund: £55,000
- Winner's share: £12,000
- High checkout: 161 John Lowe

Champion(s)
- Phil Taylor

The 1995 WDC World Darts Championship (known for sponsorship reasons as the 1995 Proton Cars World Darts Championship) was the second world championship organised by the World Darts Council (now the Professional Darts Corporation). It was held between 27 December 1994 and 2 January 1995.

Phil Taylor emerged as champion, overcoming John Lowe 5–4 in the semi-final before beating Rod Harrington 6–2 in the final to claim his first WDC World Championship title, and his third World Championship in all.

== Seeds ==
There were eight seeds in the World Championship.

1. (England) Dennis Priestley
2. (England) Rod Harrington
3. (England) Peter Evison
4. (England) Phil Taylor
5. (England) Bob Anderson
6. (England) Kevin Spiolek
7. (Scotland) Jamie Harvey
8. (England) Alan Warriner

== Prize money ==
Position (num. of players)		Prize money (Total: £55,000)
Winner	(1)	£12,000
Runner-Up	(1)	£6,000
Third place	(1)	£4,000
Fourth place	(1)	£3,000
Quarter-finalists	(4)	£2,000
Second place in group	(8)	£1,500
Third place in group	(8)	£1,250

== Results ==
=== Group stage ===
Players in bold denote match winners.

==== Group A ====
Pos	Player	P	W	L	SF	SA	+/-	Pts
1	(England) (3) Peter Evison	2	2	0	6	2	+4	**4**
2	(England) Cliff Lazarenko	2	1	1	3	5	−2	**2**
3	(England) Graeme Stoddart	2	0	2	4	6	−2	**0**

26 December

82.84 (3) **Peter Evison** (England)	**3** – 2	(England) Graeme Stoddart 86.81

27 December

82.54 **Cliff Lazarenko** (England)	**3** – 2	(England) Graeme Stoddart 80.55

28 December

92.94 (3) **Peter Evison** (England)	**3** – 0	(England) Cliff Lazarenko 85.34

==== Group B ====
Pos	Player	P	W	L	SF	SA	+/-	Pts
1	(England) (6) Kevin Spiolek	2	2	0	6	1	+5	**4**
2	(United States) Larry Butler	2	1	1	3	4	–1	**2**
3	(England) Keith Deller	2	0	2	2	6	–4	**0**

26 December

82.22 (6) **Kevin Spiolek** (England)	**3** – 1	(England) Keith Deller 82.54

27 December

86.70 **Larry Butler** (United States)	**3** – 1	(England) Keith Deller 83.96

28 December

79.07 (6) **Kevin Spiolek** (England)	**3** – 0	(United States) Larry Butler 79.15

==== Group C ====
Pos	Player	P	W	L	SF	SA	+/-	Pts
1	(Scotland) (7) Jamie Harvey	2	2	0	6	3	+3	**4**
2	(United States) Steve Brown	2	1	1	4	3	+1	**2**
3	(United States) Jim Watkins	2	0	2	2	6	−4	**0**

26 December

88.84 (7) **Jamie Harvey** (Scotland)	**3** – 1	(United States) Steve Brown 87.15

27 December

78.50 Jim Watkins (United States)	0 – **3**	(United States) **Steve Brown** 83.26

28 December

85.14 (7) **Jamie Harvey** (Scotland)	**3** – 2	(United States) Jim Watkins 79.54

==== Group D ====
Pos	Player	P	W	L	SF	SA	+/-	Pts
1	(England) (2) Rod Harrington	2	2	0	6	2	+4	**4**
2	(England) Shayne Burgess	2	1	1	5	3	+2	**2**
3	(England) Eric Bristow	2	0	2	0	6	−6	**0**

26 December

85.87 (2) **Rod Harrington** (England)	**3** – 0	(England) Eric Bristow 82.19

27 December

91.01 **Shayne Burgess** (England)	**3** – 0	(England) Eric Bristow 88.31

28 December

85.63 (2) **Rod Harrington** (England)	**3** – 2	(England) Shayne Burgess 83.05

==== Group E ====
Pos	Player	P	W	L	SF	SA	+/-	Pts
1	(England) (5) Bob Anderson	2	2	0	6	2	+4	**4**
2	(England) Ritchie Gardner	2	1	1	4	4	0	**2**
3	(United States) Jerry Umberger	2	0	2	2	6	−4	**0**

26 December

92.55 (5) **Bob Anderson** (England)	**3** – 1	(United States) Jerry Umberger 80.56

27 December

84.06 **Ritchie Gardner** (England)	**3** – 1	(United States) Jerry Umberger 80.00

28 December

91.04 (5) **Bob Anderson** (England)	**3** – 1	(England) Ritchie Gardner 81.90

==== Group F ====
Pos	Player	P	W	L	SF	SA	+/-	Pts
1	(England) (4) Phil Taylor	2	2	0	6	3	+3	**4**
2	(United States) Sean Downs	2	1	1	4	3	+1	**2**
3	(United States) Gerald Verrier	2	0	2	2	6	−4	**0**

26 December

78.63 (4) **Phil Taylor** (England)	**3** – 2	(United States) Gerald Verrier 79.24

27 December

72.28 Gerald Verrier (United States)	0 – **3**	(United States) **Sean Downs** 76.33

28 December

92.99 (4) **Phil Taylor** (England)	**3** – 1	(United States) Sean Downs 84.43

==== Group G ====
Pos	Player	P	W	L	SF	SA	+/-	Pts
1	(England) Dennis Smith	2	2	0	6	2	+4	**4**
2	(England) (8) Alan Warriner	2	1	1	4	5	−1	**2**
3	(Republic of Ireland) Tom Kirby	2	0	2	3	6	−3	**0**

26 December

87.16 (8) Alan Warriner (England)	1 – **3**	(England) **Dennis Smith** 82.80

27 December

87.69 (8) **Alan Warriner** (England)	**3** – 2	(Republic of Ireland) Tom Kirby 89.25

28 December

80.94 **Dennis Smith** (England)	**3** – 1	(Republic of Ireland) Tom Kirby 77.41

==== Group H ====
Pos	Player	P	W	L	SF	SA	+/-	Pts
1	(England) John Lowe	2	2	0	6	0	+6	**4**
2	(England) (1) Dennis Priestley	2	1	1	3	5	–2	**2**
3	(Scotland) Jocky Wilson	2	0	2	2	6	−4	**0**

26 December

80.76 (1) Dennis Priestley (England)	0 – **3**	(England) **John Lowe** 87.84

27 December

86.96 (1) **Dennis Priestley** (England)	**3** – 2	(Scotland) Jocky Wilson 81.25

28 December

93.52 **John Lowe** (England)	**3** – 0	(Scotland) Jocky Wilson 75.55

=== Knockout stages ===
Players in bold denote match winners.

**Quarter-finals** (best of 7 sets); 29–30 December
A1	(England) **Peter Evison** (3) 88.61	**4**
B1	(England) Kevin Spiolek (6) 82.85	1
C1	(Scotland) Jamie Harvey (7) 87.42	2
D1	(England) **Rod Harrington** (2) 91.40	**4**
E1	(England) Bob Anderson (5) 84.44	1
F1	(England) **Phil Taylor** (4) 89.70	**4**
G1	(England) Dennis Smith 89.23	0
H1	(England) **John Lowe** 96.77	**4**

**Semi-finals** (best of 9 sets); 1 January
A1	(England) Peter Evison (3) 82.43	1
D1	(England) **Rod Harrington** (2) 82.29	**5**
F1	(England) **Phil Taylor** (4) 96.22	**5**
H1	(England) John Lowe 90.86	4

**Final** (best of 11 sets); 2 January
D1	(England) Rod Harrington (2) 87.15	2
F1	(England) **Phil Taylor** (4) 94.12	**6**
**Third place play-off** (best of 7 sets)
A1	(England) Peter Evison (3) 84.95	2
H1	(England) **John Lowe** 82.81	**4**
