= Virginia Beach Dart Classic =

Tournament information
- Location: Virginia Beach, Virginia
- Country: United States
- Established: 1970
- Organisation(s): ADO; BDO, category C
- Format: Legs
- Prize fund: $6,570
- Month(s) Played: March

Current champion(s)
- (United States) Jason Brandon (men's) (United States) Cali West (women's)

The Virginia Beach Dart Classic is a Steel-Tip darts tournament established in 1970. The tournament is currently organised by the Tidewater Area Darts Association which is itself affiliated to the American Darts Associations (ADO). The event is a BDO category C ranked tournament the youth tournament is a ranked event of the WDF.

== List of tournament winners ==
=== Men's ===
Year	Champion	Score	Runner-up	Total Prize Money	Champion	Runner-up
1970	(United States) Jody Simkins	beat	(United States) Joe Baltadonis			
1971	(United States) Jody Simkins (2)	beat	(United States) Al Lippman			
1972	(United States) Al Lippman	beat	(United States) Jody Simkins			
1973	(United States) Dan Valletto	beat	(United States) Al Lippman			
1974	(United States) Conrad Daniels	beat	(United States) Frank Ennis			
1975	(United States) Nicky Virachkul	beat	(United States) Javier Gopar			
1976	(United States) Javier Gopar	beat	(United States) Frank Ennis			
1977	(United States) Conrad Daniels (2)	beat	(Canada) Hillyard Rossiter			
1978	(United States) Nicky Virachkul (2)	beat	(United States) Andy Green			
1979	(United States) Nicky Virachkul (3)	beat	(United States) John Kramer			
1980	(United States) Nicky Virachkul (4)	beat	(United States) Len Heard			
1981	(United States) Conrad Daniels (3)	beat	(United States) Dave Miller			
1982	(United States) Richard Long	beat	(United States) John Kramer			
1983	(United States) Nicky Virachkul (5)	beat	(United States) Cam Melchiorre			
1984	(United States) Jerry Umberger	beat	(Canada) Bob Sinnaeve			
1985	(United States) Rick Ney	beat	(United States) Gerald Verrier			
1986	(United States) Rick Reid	beat	(United States) Dick McGinnis			
1987	(United States) Rick Ney (2)	beat	(United States) Tony Payne			
1988	(United States) Andy Green	beat	(United States) Jim Damore			
1989	(United States) Dan Valletto (2)	beat	(United States) Steve Brown			
1990	(United States) Rick Ney (3)	beat	(United States) Paul Lim			
1991	(United States) Dave Kelly	beat	(United States) Sean Downs			
1992	(United States) Paul Lim	beat	(United States) Gerald Verrier			
1993	(United States) Mick Sweeney	beat	(United States) Jim Watkins			
1994	(United States) Dan Valletto (3)	beat	(United States) Jim Widmayer			
1995	(United States) Jerry Umberger (2)	beat	(United States) Sean Downs			
1996	(United States) Tim Frizzel	beat	(United States) Ray Carver			
1997	(United States) Roger Carter	beat	(United States) Bill Davis			
1998	(United States) Paul Lim (2)	beat	(United States) Scott Wollaston			
1999	(United States) Dieter Schutsch	beat	(United States) Paul Lim			
2000	(United States) Roger Carter (2)	beat	(United States) John Kuczynski			
2001	(United States) Roger Carter (3)	beat	(United States) Darin Young			
2002	(Canada) John Part	beat	(United States) Dan Lauby			
2003	(United States) Ray Carver	beat	(United States) Tony Payne			
2004	(United States) Steve Brown	beat	(United States) Bill Davis			
2005	(United States) Bill Davis	beat	(United States) Ricky Villanueva			
2006	(United States) Bill Davis (2)	beat	(United States) Brad Wethington			
2007	(United States) Darin Young	beat	(United States) Larry Butler			
2008	(United States) Bill Davis (3)	beat	(Guyana) Norman Madhoo			
2009	(United States) Brad Wethington	beat	(Philippines) Joselito Moises	$4,320	$1,200	$600
2010	(United States) Jerry van Loan	beat	(United States) Jim Widmayer	$4,320	$1,200	$600
2011	(United States) Tom Sawyer	beat	(United States) Ryan Vander Weit	$4,320	$1,200	$600
2012	(United States) Brandon Rogers	beat	(United States) Levi Remick	$4,020	$1,000	$500
2013	Did not held					
2014	Did not held					
2015	(United States) Darin Young (2)	beat	(Canada) Andre Carman	Unknown		
2016	(United States) Darin Young (3)	beat	(United States) Joe Chaney	$4,670		
2017	(United States) Joe Huffman	beat	(Canada) Shawn Brenneman	$4,670		
2018	(United States) Larry Butler	beat	(Canada) Shawn Brenneman	$4,670		
2019	(United States) Leonard Gates	4–0	(Canada) Dave Cameron	$4,670	$1,300	$650
2021	(United States) Leonard Gates (2)	6 – 1	(United States) Danny Lauby Jr.	n/a	n/a	n/a
2022	(United States) Jason Brandon	4 - 3	(United States) Leonard Gates	n/a	n/a	n/a
2023	(United States) Danny Baggish	5 - 1	(United States) Garrett French	n/a	n/a	n/a
2024	(United States) Jason Brandon (2)	5 - 4	(United States) Danny Young	n/a	n/a	n/a

=== Women's ===
Year	Champion	Score	Runner-up	Total Prize Money	Champion	Runner-up
1982	(United States) Nancy Lilly	beat				
1986	(United States) Kathy Karpowich	beat				
1988	(Japan) Toshiko Ono	beat	(United States) Sandy Reitan			
1992	(United States) Stacy Bromberg	beat				
1993	(United States) Linda Sims	beat				
1994	(United States) Frannie Frederick	beat				
1995	(United States) Bridgid Burke	beat				
1996	(United States) Stacy Bromberg (2)	beat				
1997	(United States) Julie Nicoll-Jennings	beat				
1998	(United States) Stacy Bromberg (3)	beat				
1999	(United States) Marilyn Popp	beat				
2000	(United States) Stacy Bromberg (4)	beat				
2001	(United States) Stacy Bromberg (5)	beat				
2002	(United States) Stacy Bromberg (6)	beat				
2003	(United States) Holly Part-Carver	beat				
2004	(United States) Stacy Bromberg (7)	beat				
2005	(United States) Stacy Bromberg (8)	beat				
2006	(United States) Stacy Bromberg (9)	beat				
2007	(United States) Stacy Bromberg (10)	beat				
2008	(United States) Marilyn Popp (2)	beat				
2009	(Canada) Robin Curry	beat	(United States) Paula Murphy			
2010	(United States) Marilyn Popp (3)	beat	(United States) Kim LeDuc			
2011	(United States) Stacy Bromberg (11)	beat	(United States) Paula Murphy			
2012	(United States) Sandy Hudson	beat	(United States) Marilyn Popp			
2013	(United States) Stacy Bromberg (12)	beat	(Jamaica) Deana Marsh			
2014	(United States) Paula Murphy	beat	(United States) Bette Cunningham			
2015	(Canada) Trish Grzesik	beat	(United States) Marilyn Popp			
2016	(United States) Paula Murphy (2)	beat	(United States) Sandy Haas			
2017	(United States) Lisa Ayers	beat	(United States) Paula Murphy			
2018	(United States) Cali West	beat	(United States) Stacey Pace			
2019	(United States) Cali West (2)	4–2	(United States) Stacey Pace	$1,900	$600	$300
2021	(United States) Marlise Kiel	6 – 5	(United States) Julie Weger	n/a	n/a	n/a
2022	(United States) Marlise Kiel (2)	4 – 0	(United States) Brittany Edgett	n/a	n/a	n/a
2023	(United States) Paula Murphy (3)	5 – 2	(United States) Cali West	n/a	n/a	n/a
2024	(United States) Cali West (3)	5 – 2	(United States) Paula Murphy (3)	n/a	n/a	n/a
