= 1994 World Matchplay =

1994 Proton Cars World Matchplay

Tournament information
- Dates: 1–8 August 1994
- Venue: Winter Gardens
- Location: Blackpool, England
- Organisation(s): Professional Darts Corporation (PDC)
- Format: Legs
- Prize fund: £42,800
- Winner's share: £10,000

Champion(s)
- Larry Butler (USA)

The 1994 Proton Cars World Matchplay was the inaugural staging of the World Matchplay darts tournament, and was held in the Empress Ballroom at the Winter Gardens, Blackpool from 1 to 8 August 1994.

This was the first World Matchplay tournament to be held at Winter Gardens, and was sponsored by Malaysian automaker Proton. The tournament was won by Larry Butler, who became the first, and so far only player from the United States of America to win a PDC televised title. He defeated the reigning WDC world champion Dennis Priestley in the final; Priestley would go on to lose the next two World Matchplay finals in addition to this.

The second round match between Jim Watkins and Keith Deller went into a tiebreak at 7–7 in legs, and finished with Watkins winning 18–16, meaning that 20 of the 34 legs of the match were within the tiebreak itself.

== Prize money ==
The prize fund was £42,400.

| Position (no. of players) | | Prize money (Total: £42,400) |
|---|---|---|
| Winner | (1) | £10,000 |
| Runner-Up | (1) | £6,000 |
| Third place | (1) | £3,250 |
| Fourth place | (1) | £2,750 |
| Quarter-finalists | (4) | £1,500 |
| Second round | (8) | £800 |
| First round | (16) | £500 |

== Seeds ==
1. (England) Dennis Priestley
2. (England) Peter Evison
3. (England) Bob Anderson
4. (United States) Steve Brown
5. (England) Rod Harrington
6. (United States) Sean Downs
7. (England) Cliff Lazarenko
8. (England) Kevin Spiolek

== Results ==
First round (best of 15 legs); 1–3 August
1 | (England) Dennis Priestley 88.41 | 8
(England) Eric Bristow 76.29 | 3
(United States) Gerald Verrier 83.49 | 8
(England) John Lowe 76.80 | 2
8 | (England) Kevin Spiolek 80.10 | 6
(Scotland) Jamie Harvey 82.89 | 8
(England) Graeme Stoddart 81.30 | 8
(United States) Whit Whitley 72.99 | 2
5 | (England) Rod Harrington 86.61 | 8
(England) Kevin Burrows 78.99 | 2
(United States) Tony Payne 88.23 | 3
(Singapore) Paul Lim 82.11 | 8
4 | (United States) Steve Brown 78.90 | 4
(United States) Jim Watkins 85.89 | 8
(United States) Jim Widmayer 78.21 | 6
(England) Keith Deller 83.40 | 8
2 | (England) Peter Evison 81.21 | 3
(Scotland) Jocky Wilson 82.50 | 8
(England) Ritchie Gardner 88.80 | 6
(England) Alan Warriner 91.29 | 8
7 | (England) Cliff Lazarenko 72.09 | 6
(United States) Jerry Umberger 78.51 | 8
(United States) Larry Butler 83.61 | 8
(England) Steve Raw 80.49 | 2
6 | (United States) Sean Downs 77.61 | 7
(England) Shayne Burgess 80.49 | 9
(United States) Dave Kelly 70.80 | 3
(England) Dennis Smith 79.89 | 8
3 | (England) Bob Anderson 85.29 | 8
(England) Mick Manning 83.79 | 4
(Republic of Ireland) Tom Kirby 81.81 | 2
(England) Phil Taylor 86.70 | 8

Second round (best of 15 legs); 4–5 August
1 | (England) Dennis Priestley 89.10 | 8
(United States) Gerald Verrier 80.10 | 4
(Scotland) Jamie Harvey 87.21 | 8
(England) Graeme Stoddart 79.80 | 3
5 | (England) Rod Harrington 78.81 | 8
(Singapore) Paul Lim 81.09 | 4
(United States) Jim Watkins 82.29 | 18
(England) Keith Deller 80.01 | 16
(Scotland) Jocky Wilson 88.59 | 10
(England) Alan Warriner 86.10 | 8
(United States) Jerry Umberger 78.30 | 2
(United States) Larry Butler 82.50 | 8
(England) Shayne Burgess 84.99 | 8
(England) Dennis Smith 79.59 | 4
3 | (England) Bob Anderson 90.51 | 11
(England) Phil Taylor 89.49 | 9

Quarter-finals (best of 21 legs); 6 August
1 | (England) Dennis Priestley 98.49 | 11
(Scotland) Jamie Harvey 87.81 | 4
5 | (England) Rod Harrington 86.79 | 11
(United States) Jim Watkins 81.09 | 7
(Scotland) Jocky Wilson 90.39 | 4
(United States) Larry Butler 94.29 | 11
(England) Shayne Burgess 88.11 | 11
3 | (England) Bob Anderson 89.91 | 8

Semi-finals (best of 21 legs); 7 August
1 | (England) Dennis Priestley 94.80 | 11
5 | (England) Rod Harrington 92.19 | 4
(United States) Larry Butler 90.39 | 11
(England) Shayne Burgess 85.41 | 7

Final (best of 31 legs); 8 August
1 | (England) Dennis Priestley 91.59 | 12
(United States) Larry Butler 92.70 | 16
Third place playoff (best of 21 legs); 8 August
5 | (England) Rod Harrington | 11
(England) Shayne Burgess | 9
