= Larry Butler (darts player) =

American darts player

Personal information
- Full name: Larry Thomas Butler
- Nickname: "The Eagle"
- Born: July 21, 1957 (age 69) Owensboro, Kentucky, U.S.
- Home town: Dayton, Ohio, U.S.

Sport
- Sport: Darts
- Playing since: 1977
- Darts: 24g Dynasty
- Laterality: Right-handed
- Walk-on music: "Born in the U.S.A." by Bruce Springsteen

Organisation (see split in darts)
- BDO: 1992–1993, 2010–2013, 2014–2020
- PDC: 1994–1997, 2007–2010, 2013–2014
- WDF: 2014–
- Current world ranking: (WDF) NR (17 August 2026)

WDF major events – best performances
- World Championship: Last 16: 2016
- World Masters: Runner Up: 2015

PDC premier events – best performances
- World Championship: Quarter Final: 1996
- World Matchplay: Winner (1): 1994
- UK Open: Last 96: 2009
- Grand Slam: Group stage: 2015
- Desert Classic: Last 32: 2008
- US Open/WSoD: Last 64: 2007, 2010

WSDT major events – best performances
- World Championship: Quarter Final: 2022
- World Matchplay: Last 16: 2022

Other tournament wins
- Years
| ADO National Team | 2013, 2016, 2017 |
| ADO Atlantic City Open | 2012 |
| ADO Blazing Saddles Open | 2011, 2012 |
| ADO Camellia Classic | 2012 |
| ADO Easy Money Open | 2012 |
| ADO Great Lakes Challenge | 2010 |
| ADO Lake Erie Classic | 2011 |
| ADO Midwest Summer Classic | 2011 |
| ADO Monster Mash | 2011 |
| ADO Music City Classic | 2017 |
| ADO Orioles Open | 2011 |
| ADO PA Open | 2011 |
| ADO Shoot For The Moon | 2014, 2016, 2018 |
| ADO Summer Slam | 2011 |
| ADO Syracuse Open | 2011 |
| ADO Washington Open | 2012 |
| ADO World Cup Team | 2011 |
| CDC Pro Tour | 2012, 2013 (x2), 2022 |
| Charlotte Open | 2012 |
| Cleveland Extravaganza | 2014 |
| Colorado Open | 2010, 2011 |
| Las Vegas Open | 1992, 2011 |
| Metroplex Open | 2012 |
| Music City Classic | 2016, 2021 |
| Port City Open | 2014 |
| Bullshooter World Ch'ship | 1992, 1993, 1997 |
| USA Darts Classic | 2007, 2010, 2015, 2017 |
| USA Ch'ship | 2012 |

Other achievements
- Nine-dart finish, PDPA Players Championship Las Vegas 2009

Larry Thomas Butler (born July 21, 1957), nicknamed the Bald Eagle, is an American professional darts player who was the winner of the 1994 PDC World Matchplay. This success made him the first and so far only player from the United States of America to have won a PDC Major darts tournament in Europe.

Butler also had some success in his home country, winning the 1993, 1994, 1995 New York Open, the 1994 Darts America Championship, the 1991, 1992, 1993 World Bullshooter Championship, and the 1991, 1992, 1994, 1995 Cincinnati Spring Fling Open.

== BDO ==
Butler made his World Championship debut in 1992, losing to Dennis Priestley in the first round.

== PDC ==
During 1993–94 to organise their own tournaments and their own World Championships (see split in darts). Several North American players were invited to join them in tournaments and Butler appeared at the first WDC (now Professional Darts Corporation, PDC) World Championship in 1994. He failed to qualify from the group stages, but produced a notable victory over three-time former world champion, John Lowe. Lowe was the last world champion before the split just twelve months earlier. During 1994, Butler was one of many names representing the WDC, the others being Gerald Verrier, Dave Kelly, Steve Brown, Sean Downs, Jim Watkins, Jerry Umberger, Whit Whitley, Jim Widmayer, Lori Verrier, Barry Twomlow, Graeme Stoddart, Steve Raw, Tony Payne, Paul Lim, Jim Damore, Dieter Schutsch, Russ Lopez and Rudy Hernandez.

Few would have predicted that Butler would take the World Matchplay in Blackpool later in 1994. He beat Steve Raw, Jerry Umberger, Jocky Wilson and Shayne Burgess to reach the final where he beat World Champion Priestley by 16 legs to 12 to take the trophy and £10,000 top prize.

Butler also competed at the 1995, 1996 and 1997 WDC World Championships where he beat former world champions Keith Deller and John Lowe plus world number one Rod Harrington but only managed to qualify past the group stages in 1996 when he lost to Jamie Harvey in the quarter-finals.

Despite his excellent results, including victories over several world champions, Butler ceased competing regularly on the circuit after the 1997 World Championships. Most major tournaments were staged in the United Kingdom and few North American players were able to make an impact, mainly due to travelling difficulties.

After an absence of ten years, Butler began competing again on the PDC North American circuit which began to expand during 2007. He also won the USA Dart Classic, a World Darts Federation tournament.

Butler then made his first televised appearance in over ten years by qualifying for the 2008 Las Vegas Desert Classic as one of four North American qualifiers. He lost in the first round 6–4 to Alan Tabern.

In April 2009 Butler traveled to Europe to compete in a series of PDC Players Championships and in UK Blue Square Open qualifiers. He advanced to the money round in 13 out of 16 events he entered. His best finish was a quarter-final appearance in the West Midlands regional final on April 1, 2009.

At the 2009 PDC Players Championship in Las Vegas Butler hit a nine dart finish but lost 6–2 in his second round match against Jan van der Rassel The tournament was considered a "warm-up" event for the 2009 Las Vegas Desert Classic.

In June 2009 Butler partnered with Canadian Champion Bob Sinnaeve. Sinnaeve and Butler enjoyed great success at their first outing together in Boston winning the Cricket Doubles and finishing 2nd in the 501 doubles at the North American Open. They won the Cricket doubles at the Windy City open in Chicago with Butler taking 2nd place in the 501 Singles. In Atlanta, at the Peachtree Open, Butler captured the crown in both the Pro Singles and the 501 Singles. He also won the Blind draw and the open doubles 501 and finished 2nd in the Cricket Doubles. Butler and Sinnaeve finished up 2009 at the Buckeye Open in Columbus Ohio by winning the 501 doubles.

2010 started successfully for Butler. He traveled to Philadelphia to play in the Ray Chesnae Open and finished 3rd in the Pro singles and 2nd in both the cricket doubles and mixed triples. At the Huntsville AL they won both the 501 doubles and the Mixed triples. Butler finished 2nd in the singles event. In Syracuse NY they swept the singles events with Butler winning both the Pro Shoot and the Cricket Singles and Sinnaeve taking the title in the 501 singles. They also won the mixed triples and finished 2nd in the cricket doubles.

The St. Paddy's Day tourney in Indianapolis proved another successful weekend for Butler. He picked up top honors in the 501 Doubles and the Cricket Singles. He was also the finalist in the Mixed Doubles, 501 singles and the Cricket Doubles.

In early April, Butler traveled northeast to New Hampshire for the $20,000 White Mountain Shootout. He started the weekend there with a semi-final finish in the Pro Shoot. He went on to win the men's doubles and the mixed triples with Sinnaeve. Butler captured the Cricket Singles title and finished the weekend with another semi final finish in the 3rd singles.

Cleveland was up next. Butler finished 3rd in the pro shoot and took top honors in the cricket singles.

Butler then reached the semi-finals of the North American Darts Championship, defeating the likes of John Kuczynski, Bill Davis and Paul Lim before losing to Darin Young.

Butler traveled to Upper Michigan to attend the Little River Darts Tourney and then on to Nashville. He added a first a second and ties for fourth and sixteenth to his resume before heading east to Stamford CT for the USA Darts Classic. In a field of over 200 players, he captured the title in both the 501 and Cricket singles events. It was here in CT that Butler decided to rejoin the American Darts Organization and pursue a shot at the World Masters title. Winning the 501 singles got him an automatic invite to the Masters. Butler followed up that performance with a win at the Windy City Open 501 Singles and then Swept both singles titles in Colorado. 2010 came to an end with a win at the ADO cricket qualifier and an automatic Invite on merit to the World Cup in Ireland in 2011.

In 2011 he secured a spot on the World Cup team and several invites to the World Masters. He traveled to Philadelphia for the Rae Chesnay $25,600 tournament. He captured the 501 Singles title and felt well prepared to head to Las Vegas for the ADO Cricket Championship and tournament. Butler arrived in Las Vegas and went on to win the National Cricket Championship and the 501 Singles. He was the runner-up in the Cricket Singles event there and also captured the 501 Doubles title.

Butler was back to the TV stage in his first PDC World Cup appearance for the USA. He played alongside Darin Young in February 2013, but they finished bottom of Group F after losing 4–5 to Finland and 3–5 to Germany. In the second round of the 2014 World Cup of Darts, Butler lost to England's Phil Taylor, but Young beat Adrian Lewis meaning a doubles match was required to settle the tie which the United States pair lost 4–1.

== Back in the BDO ==
Butler returned to the British Darts Organisation in 2015, which included winning the BDO America Rankings from wins in the Camellia Classic and USA Dart Classic. In October, he reached the Grand Slam of Darts by winning one of the two spots on offer. He beat notable names like Scott Waites and Glen Durrant. He also went on a fantastic run to the World Masters final beating one, two and three time BDO World Champions Scott Mitchell, Scott Waites and Martin Adams but ultimately lost to Glen Durrant 7–3.

In November he played in the Grand Slam of Darts but was ultimately knocked out of a tough group, losing 5–0 to PDC World Champion Gary Anderson, defeating Andy Boulton 5–4 and losing to 5 time world champion Raymond van Barneveld 5–3.

In January 2016 Butler competed in the 2016 World Championship, which was his first World Championship appearance in 19 years. Starting off in the preliminary round he defeated James Hurrell 3–2 and then went on to beat Ryan De Vreede 3–2 before losing to number one seed Glen Durrant 4–0.

== World Championship results ==
=== BDO ===
- 1992: First round (lost to Dennis Priestley 1–3)
- 2016: Second round (lost to Glen Durrant 0–4)

=== PDC ===
- 1994: Group stage (lost to Tom Kirby 1–3 and beat John Lowe 3–2)
- 1995: Group stage (beat Keith Deller 3–2 and lost to Kevin Spiolek 0–3)
- 1996: Quarter-finals (lost to Jamie Harvey 0–4)
- 1997: Group stage (lost to Graeme Stoddart 1–3 and Alan Warriner 1–3)

=== WSDT ===
- 2022: Quarter-finals (lost to Martin Adams 1–3)
- 2023: First round (lost to Darren Johnson 2–3)

== Career finals ==
=== BDO Major finals: 1 (1 runner-up) ===
| Outcome | No. | Year | Championship | Opponent in the final | Score (Note: (l) = score in legs, (s) = score in sets.) |
|---|---|---|---|---|---|
| Runner-up | 1. | 2015 | World Masters | (England) Glen Durrant | 3–7 (s) |

=== PDC major finals: 1 (1 title) ===
| Outcome | No. | Year | Championship | Opponent in the final | Score |
|---|---|---|---|---|---|
| Winner | 1. | 1994 | World Matchplay | Dennis Priestley | 16–12 (l) |

== Performance timeline ==
| Tournament | 1988 | 1989 | 1990 | 1991 | 1992 | 1993 | 1994 | 1995 | 1996 | 1997 | 1998 | 1999 | 2000 | 2001 | 2002 | 2003 | 2004 | 2005 | 2006 | 2007 | 2008 | 2009 | 2010 | 2011 | 2012 | 2013 | 2014 | 2015 | 2016 | 2017 | 2018 |
|---|---|---|---|---|---|---|---|---|---|---|---|---|---|---|---|---|---|---|---|---|---|---|---|---|---|---|---|---|---|---|---|
| BDO World Championship | DNQ | | | | 1R | Qualified 5 years in a row, invited once | | | | | | | | | | | | | | | | | | | | | | | 2R | DNQ | |
| Winmau World Masters | 1R | 1R | DNP | 2R | DNP | 2R | DNP | | | | | | | | | | | | | | | | | 2R | DNP | | 1R | F | RR | 1R | 1R |
| PDC World Championship | NYF | | | | | | RR | RR | QF | RR | DNP | | | | | | | | | | | | | | | | | | | | |
| World Matchplay | Not held | | | | | | W | QF | 1R | DNP | | | | | | | | | | | | | | | | | | | | | |
| Las Vegas Desert Classic | Not held | | | | | | | | | | | | | | DNQ | | | | | | 1R | DNQ | Not held | | | | | | | | |
| UK Open | Not held | | | | | | | | | | | | | | | DNQ | | | | | | 2R | DNQ | | | | | | | | |
| Grand Slam of Darts | Not held | | | | | | | | | | | | | | | | | | | DNQ | | | | | | | | RR | DNQ | | |

Performance Table Legend
| W | Won the tournament | F | Finalist | SF | Semifinalist | QF | Quarterfinalist | #R; RR; Prel. | Lost in # round Round-robin; Preliminary round | DQ | Disqualified |
| DNQ | Did not qualify | DNP | Did not participate | WD | Withdrew | NH | Tournament not held | #R; RR; Prel. | Lost in # round Round-robin; Preliminary round | NYF | Not yet founded |
