= PDC World Rankings =

World ranking system for darts

The PDC World Rankings or PDC Order of Merit, known for sponsorship purposes as the Werner Rankings Ladder, is the world ranking system for professional darts players used by the Professional Darts Corporation (PDC), which ranks players according to the prize money won in PDC ranking tournaments. These world rankings are used to determine qualification and seeding for the televised ranking tournaments as well as the awarding of PDC Tour Cards at the end of the season. The format has been used since the 2007 PDC World Darts Championship, superseding the original PDC World Ranking system established in 1993, where points were awarded for performances in tournaments according to their relative prestige. Upon the introduction of the rankings, the first player to hold the number one rank was Alan Warriner. Since 1993, thirteen other players have held the top spot, including Luke Littler, the current world number one. Alongside the main ranking, the PDC also operates several secondary rankings which count prize money won on specific PDC Tours and may also offer qualification to specific televised events.

== Methodology ==
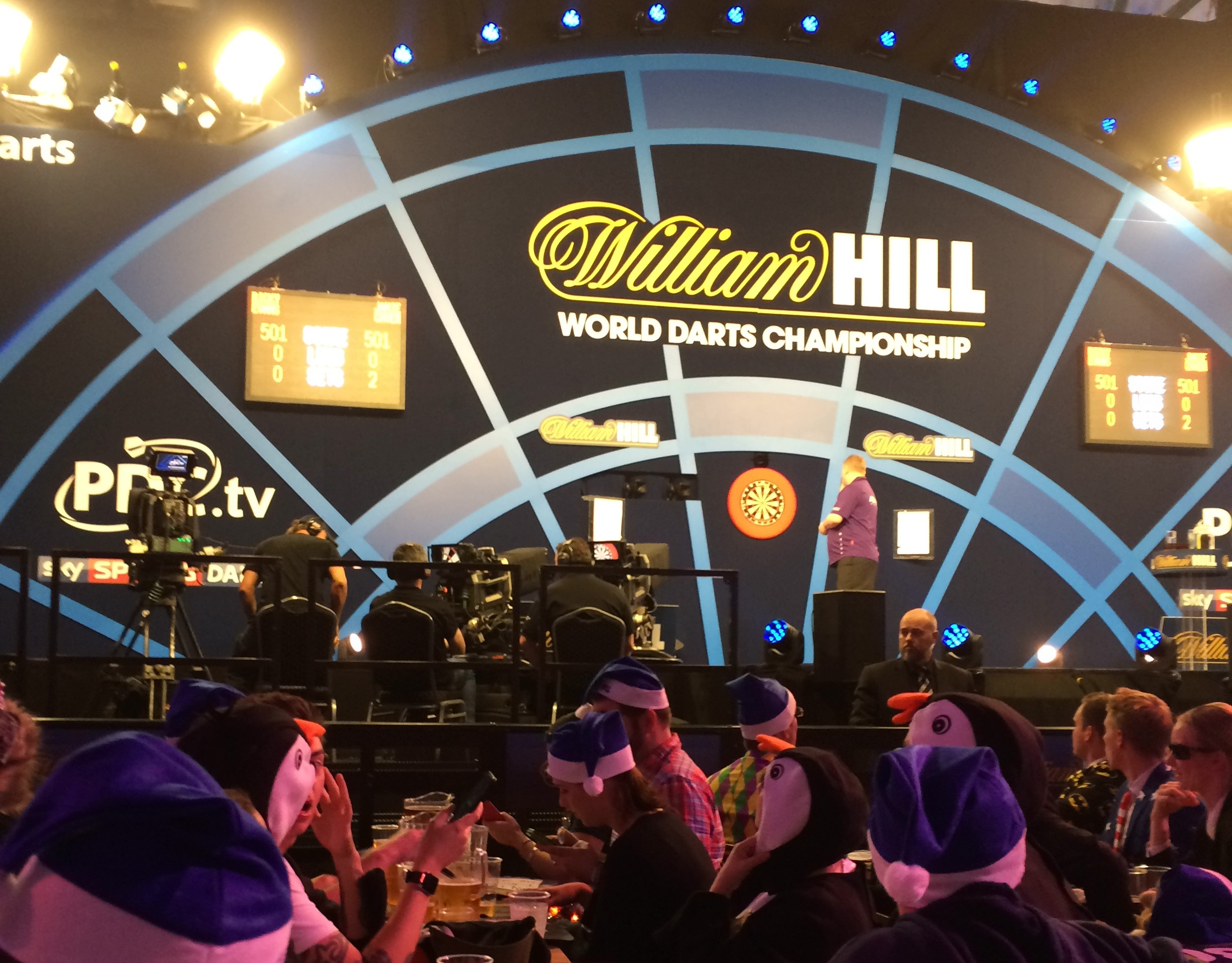
The PDC World Darts Championship offers the highest amount of prize money of any event contributing to the Order of Merit.

The Professional Darts Corporation adopted the current Order of Merit system in 2007. In this system, the total prize money won in PDC ranking events over the eligibility period is counted. For PDC Tour Card holders, this eligibility period is either the previous two years or since the player was awarded a tour card, whichever is shorter. The PDC World Darts Championship is considered last event of the season, after which the year-end Order of Merit is calculated and players in the top 64 offered a Tour Card for the following year. New Tour Card holders start on £0, even if they held a Tour Card in the previous season but failed to make the top 64, resulting in them having to regain their Tour Card through the qualifying tournament, Q School. Players without Tour Cards who earn money in ranking tournaments (such as Luke Littler in the 2024 PDC World Darts Championship) are eligible to be ranked during the season, though if they fail to reach the top 64 at the end of the year, their ranking money is reset to £0. If two players are tied and need separating for seeding or event qualification, the tie is broken by the player with the highest total earnings across the previous four ranking tournaments. If this fails to break the tie, players' prize money is counted back from the most recent event until a tie can be broken, with the possibility of a play-off if this cannot break the tie.

=== Ranking tournaments ===
The PDC holds ranked and unranked tournaments. Ranking tournaments are those which all PDC Tour Card holders are eligible to participate in or qualify for, while unranked tournaments are invitational and do not count toward the Order of Merit. Currently, the Premier League, World Series of Darts events and the World Cup of Darts are the only unranked PDC tournaments with Tour Card Holder participation outside of the secondary tours.

Prize money awarded towards 2026 PDC Order of Merit in ranking tournaments (£1000s)
Tournament	Total	Winner	Finalist	Top 4	Top 8	Top 16	Top 32	Top 48	Top 64	Top 96	Top 128	Prelim. Top 16	Prelim. Top 32	Prelim. Top 64
2026 Prize Money
PDC Premier Events (2026)
World Championship	5,000	1,000	400	200	100	60	35	—N/a	25	—N/a	15	—N/a		
World Masters	500	100	50	30	17.5	10	5	—N/a				2.5	1	0.75
UK Open	750	120	60	35	20	12.5	7.5	—N/a	3	2	1.25	—N/a		
World Matchplay	1,000	225	125	65	35	22.5	12.5	—N/a	—N/a					
World Grand Prix	750	150	80	50	35	20	7.5	—N/a						
European Championship	750	150	80	50	35	20	7.5	—N/a						
Grand Slam of Darts (Note: An additional £3,500 is awarded to the 8 group winners.)	1,000	200	100	60	35	20	—N/a	5 (Note: £12,500 and £5,000 are awarded to the second and third place finishers respectively in the group stage, which comprise the top 48.)	—N/a					
Players Championship Finals	750	130	70	40	27.5	15	7	—N/a	4	—N/a				
PDC Pro Tour
15 European Tours	230	35	15	10	8	5	3.5 (Note: Seeded players at European Tour events automatically qualify to the top 32, and do not receive money toward Order of Merit if they lose at this stage.)	2	—N/a	—N/a				
34 Players Championships	150	15	10	6.5	4	3	2	—N/a	1.25	—N/a				
Total 2026 payouts	19,484	3,110	1,530	1,802	2,244	2,856	3,240	752	2,533	64	1,000	40	16	12
2025 Prize Money
PDC Premier Events (2025)
World Championship	2,500	500	200	100	50	35	25	—N/a	15	—N/a	7.5	—N/a		
World Masters	500	100	50	30	12.5	10	5	—N/a				2.5	1	0.75
UK Open	600	110	50	30	15	10	5	—N/a	2.5	1.5	1	—N/a		
World Matchplay	800	200	100	50	30	15	10	—N/a						
World Grand Prix	600	120	60	40	25	15	7.5	—N/a						
European Championship	600	120	60	40	25	15	7.5	—N/a						
Grand Slam of Darts	650	150	70	50	25	12	5 (Note: £8,000 and £5,000 are awarded to the third and fourth place finishers respectively in the group stage, which comprise the top 32.)	—N/a						
Players Championship Finals	600	120	60	30	20	10	6.5	—N/a	3	—N/a				
PDC Pro Tour (Note: In 2025, the Pro Tour expanded from 13 European Tour events to 14 and 30 Players Championship events to 34, meaning a total of £675,000 extra prize money was awarded relative to 2024.)
14 European Tours	175	30	12	8.5	6	4	2.5	1.25	—N/a					
34 Players Championships	125	15	10	5	3.5	2.5	1.5	—N/a	1.0	—N/a				
Total 2025 payouts	14,625	2,670	1,246	1,401	1,682	2,102	2,448	17.5	2,064	48	992	20	16	24
Prize money from the 2024 season still contributing to the Order of Merit, where differing from 2025 prize money
World Championship	2,500	500	200	100	50	35	25	—N/a	15	7.5	—N/a			

== Rankings ==
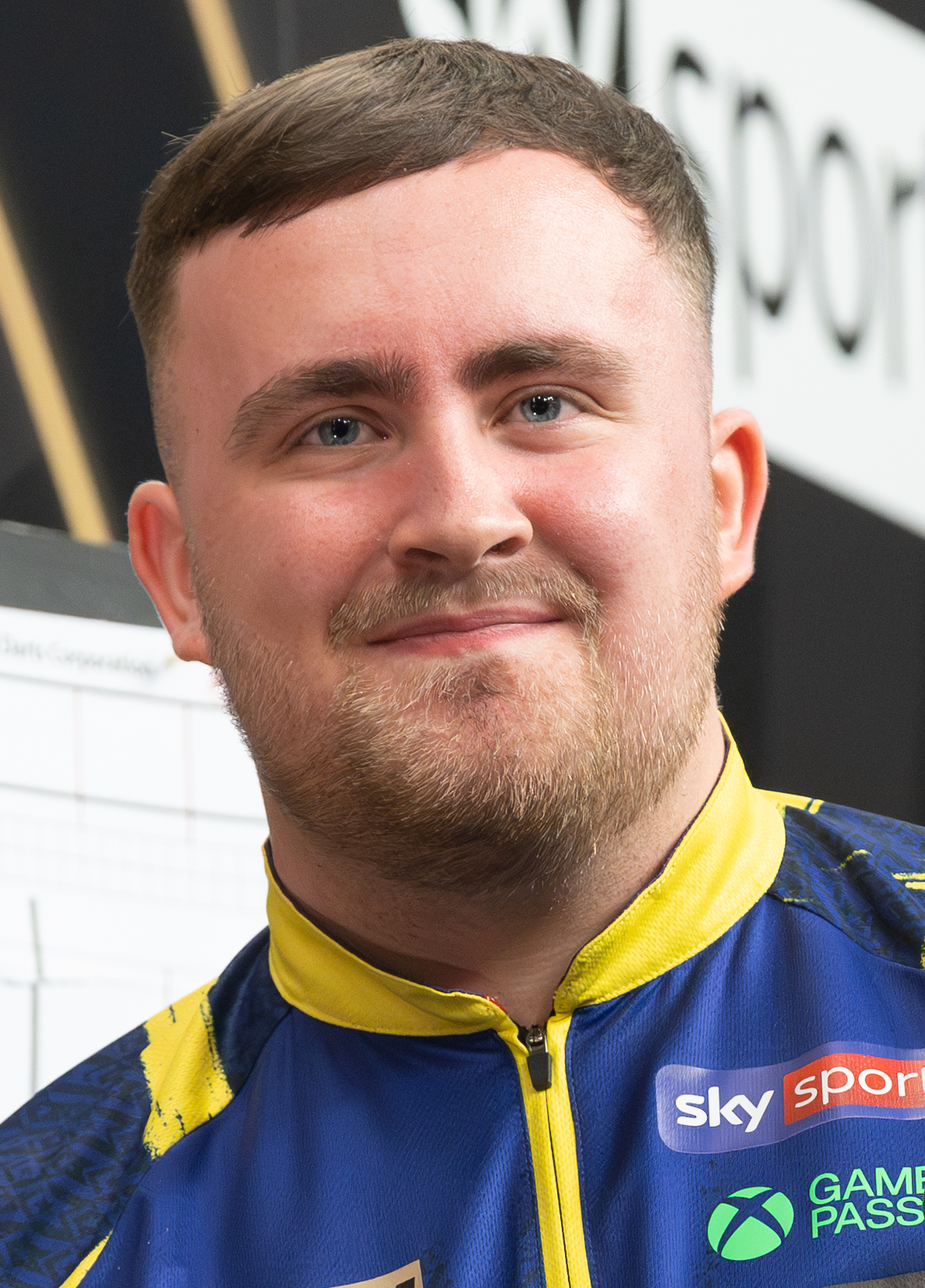
Luke Littler, the current PDC world number one

PDC World Rankings as of 29 July 2026.
Players ranked 1 - 32
Rank	Change	Player	Earnings
1	Steady	Luke Littler	£3,128,500
2	Steady	Luke Humphries	£1,005,500
3	Steady	Gian van Veen	£1,005,250
4	Steady	Gerwyn Price	£725,000
5	Steady	Jonny Clayton	£683,000
6	Steady	James Wade	£656,250
7	Steady	Michael van Gerwen	£645,000
8	Steady	Josh Rock	£639,500
9	Steady	Stephen Bunting	£618,250
10	Steady	Danny Noppert	£601,750
11	Steady	Gary Anderson	£598,250
12	Steady	Ryan Searle	£596,250
13	Steady	Wessel Nijman	£570,250
14	Steady	Chris Dobey	£569,500
15	Steady	Ross Smith	£534,250
16	Steady	Nathan Aspinall	£531,750
17	Steady	Jermaine Wattimena	£510,750
18	Steady	Luke Woodhouse	£492,000
19	Steady	Martin Schindler	£448,750
20	▲1	Damon Heta	£439,250
21	▼1	Krzysztof Ratajski	£430,000
22	▲1	Dirk van Duijvenbode	£425,750
23	▼1	Mike De Decker	£424,500
24	Steady	Rob Cross	£423,000
25	Steady	Ryan Joyce	£396,250
26	Steady	Cameron Menzies	£383,250
27	Steady	Andrew Gilding	£365,250
28	Steady	Dave Chisnall	£362,250
29	Steady	Daryl Gurney	£353,500
30	Steady	Kevin Doets	£347,750
31	Steady	Joe Cullen	£314,500
32	Steady	Ritchie Edhouse	£301,250
*Change since 26 July 2026.

PDC World Rankings as of 29 July 2026.
Players ranked 33 - 64
Rank	Change	Player	Earnings
33	Steady	Peter Wright	£282,000
34	Steady	Ricardo Pietreczko	£279,750
35	Steady	Michael Smith	£253,750
36	Steady	Niels Zonneveld	£253,250
37	Steady	William O'Connor	£251,000
38	▲1	Niko Springer	£217,000
39	▼1	Martin Lukeman	£214,250
40	▲1	Raymond van Barneveld	£200,500
41	▼1	Callan Rydz	£199,000
42	▲1	Mickey Mansell	£192,750
43	▼1	Madars Razma	£192,250
44	▲3	Justin Hood	£189,000
45	▼1	Gabriel Clemens	£187,750
46	▼1	Connor Scutt	£184,250
47	▼1	Dimitri Van den Bergh	£182,500
48	▲3	Jeffrey de Graaf	£174,750
49	Steady	Ricky Evans	£174,000
50	Steady	James Hurrell	£173,250
51	▼3	Scott Williams	£171,250
52	Steady	Kim Huybrechts	£164,000
53	Steady	Mensur Suljović	£161,250
54	Steady	Brendan Dolan	£160,250
55	Steady	Ian White	£154,750
56	▲4	Sebastian Białecki	£145,000
56	Steady	Keane Barry	£145,000
58	▲1	Karel Sedláček	£144,500
58	Steady	Richard Veenstra	£144,500
60	▼3	Alan Soutar	£137,250
61	Steady	Robert Owen	£128,750
62	Steady	Ryan Meikle	£124,750
63	▲1	Nick Kenny	£123,750
64	▼1	Lukas Wenig	£123,500
*Change since 26 July 2026.

Click "show" to view players ranked outside top 64

PDC World Rankings as of 29 July 2026.
Players ranked 65th or lower
Rank	Change	Player	Earnings
65	Steady	Thibault Tricole	£118,250
66	▲1	Mario Vandenbogaerde	£113,000
67	▼1	Max Hopp	£111,000
68	Steady	Bradley Brooks	£109,750
69	Steady	Cam Crabtree	£100,000
70	Steady	Wesley Plaisier	£92,750
71	Steady	Adam Lipscombe	£78,750
72	Steady	Maik Kuivenhoven	£76,750
73	Steady	Cristo Reyes	£76,000
74	Steady	Tom Bissell	£67,500
75	▲2	Darryl Pilgrim	£66,250
76	▼1	Cor Dekker	£65,750
77	▲1	Beau Greaves	£62,500
78	▼2	Dominik Grüllich	£62,250
79	Steady	Christian Kist	£60,500
80	Steady	Andy Boulton	£53,000
81	Steady	Jim Long	£50,500
82	Steady	Tom Sykes	£49,000
83	Steady	Charlie Manby	£42,000
84	▲5	Joe Hunt	£40,750
84	▲2	Oskar Lukasiak	£40,750
86	▼3	Leon Weber	£40,000
87	▼2	Thomas Lovely	£38,500
88	Steady	Jimmy van Schie	£38,250
89	▼2	Tavis Dudeney	£37,250
90	Steady	Marvin van Velzen	£36,500
91	Steady	Darius Labanauskas	£36,250
92	Steady	Viktor Tingström	£34,500
93	Steady	Shane McGuirk	£33,500
94	Steady	Alexander Merkx	£32,250
95	▲30	Henry Coates	£30,750
96	▼1	Kai Gotthardt	£29,750
97	▲1	Mervyn King	£29,000
98	▲4	David Sharp	£28,750
99	▼1	Adam Paxton	£28,250
100	▼4	Adam Warner	£27,500
100	▼4	Dennie Olde Kalter	£27,500
102	▼2	Greg Ritchie	£26,750
103	▼2	Adam Gawlas	£25,750
104	▲4	Jurjen van der Velde	£24,750
105	Steady	Jeffrey de Zwaan	£24,250
106	▼3	Jeffrey Sparidaans	£23,750
107	▲3	Benjamin Pratnemer	£23,250
107	▼3	Owen Bates	£23,250
109	▼4	Tommy Morris	£23,000
110	▲4	Tyler Thorpe	£22,750
110	▼1	Niall Culleton	£22,750
112	▼5	Scott Waites	£22,500
113	▼2	Chris Landman	£20,750
114	▲1	Jack Tweddell	£20,500
114	▼2	Stephen Burton	£20,500
116	▼3	Martijn Dragt	£20,250
117	▲5	Sietse Lap	£19,250
118	Steady	Maximilian Czerwinski	£18,750
119	▲2	Rhys Griffin	£18,000
120	▼4	Arno Merk	£17,750
120	▼4	Derek Coulson	£17,750
122	▼4	Tommy Lishman	£17,500
123	▼3	Adam Leek	£17,250
124	Steady	Stephen Rosney	£15,750
125	▼2	Tytus Kanik	£15,000
126	▲3	Stefaan Henderyck	£14,250
127	▲3	Steve Lennon	£13,750
128	▼2	Nathan Potter	£13,000
128	▼2	Harry Ward	£13,000
130	▼2	Stefan Bellmont	£12,750
131	▼1	Yorick Hofkens	£12,500
132	Steady	Pascal Rupprecht	£12,250
133	▲1	Samuel Price	£10,750
134	▲2	Carl Sneyd	£10,500
135	▼2	Rusty-Jake Rodriguez	£10,000
136	▲5	Daniel Ayres	£9,750
137	▲1	Marvin Kraft	£9,500
137	▼3	Paul Krohne	£9,500
139	▼3	Boris Krčmar	£8,500
140	▼2	Daniel Klose	£8,250
141	▼1	Andy Baetens	£8,000
142	Steady	Michael Unterbuchner	£7,500
143	Steady	Jan Schmidt	£7,000
143	Steady	Patrik Kovács	£7,000
145	▲3	Lewis Pride	£6,500
145	Steady	Pero Ljubić	£6,500
147	▼1	Dragutin Horvat	£5,500
147	▼1	Marcel Hausotter	£5,500
149	▲4	Christopher Wickenden	£5,000
150	▲9	Oliver Mitchell	£4,250
151	▼2	Johan Engström	£4,000
151	▼2	Finn Behrens	£4,000
151	▼2	Callum Goffin	£4,000
151	▼2	Anton Östlund	£4,000
155	▼2	Aden Kirk	£3,750
155	▼2	Filip Bereza	£3,750
155	▼2	Scott Campbell	£3,750
158	▼1	Valters Melderis	£3,500
159	▼1	Jack Aldridge	£3,250
160	▼1	Patrik Williams	£3,000
161	▲34	Ted Evetts	£2,500
161	Steady	Graham Hall	£2,500
163	▼1	Jaimy van de Weerd	£2,000
163	▼1	Michal Šmejda	£2,000
163	▼1	Mio Varila	£2,000
163	▼1	Adrian Dudek	£2,000
163	▼1	Gabriel Varaljay	£2,000
163	▼1	Jan Sliacky	£2,000
163	▼1	Juraj Holub	£2,000
163	▼1	Péter Kelemen	£2,000
163	▼1	Jason Riedtke	£2,000
163	▼1	Nándor Major	£2,000
163	▼1	Teemu Harju	£2,000
163	▼1	György Jehirszki	£2,000
163	▼1	Liam Maendl-Lawrance	£2,000
163	▼1	Aaron Hardy	£2,000
163	▼1	Nick Zwittnigg	£2,000
163	▼1	Zoran Lerchbacher	£2,000
163	▼1	Michael Hurtz	£2,000
163	▼1	Petr Křivka	£2,000
163	▼1	Robin Masino	£2,000
163	▼1	Kevin Troppmann	£2,000
163	▼1	François Schweyen	£2,000
163	▼1	Jani Haavisto	£2,000
163	▼1	Pascal Devroey	£2,000
163	▼1	Florian Hempel	£2,000
163	▼1	Florian Preis	£2,000
163	▼1	Jonas Masalin	£2,000
163	▼1	Wojciech Bruliński	£2,000
163	▼1	Sam Spivey	£2,000
163	▼1	Andreas Harrysson	£2,000
163	▼1	Dawid Robak	£2,000
163	▼1	Krzysztof Kciuk	£2,000
163	▼1	Mirosław Grudziecki	£2,000
163	▼1	Piotr Maciejczak	£2,000
196	New entry	Gilbert van der Meijden	£1,250
196	▼1	Danny Trueman	£1,250
196	▼1	Matthias Ehlers	£1,250
196	▼1	Jack Todd	£1,250
196	▼1	Jamai van den Herik	£1,250
196	▼1	Oliver King	£1,250
196	▼1	Ron Meulenkamp	£1,250
196	▼1	Samuel Whittaker	£1,250
204	▼1	Danny van Trijp	£750
204	▼1	Jesús Sálate	£750
*Change since 26 July 2026.

== Other PDC rankings ==
In addition to the main two-year ranking, the PDC also operates three rankings for subsets of the PDC Tour and four rankings for secondary tours. These rankings offer qualification to televised events and are the basis for seeding in tournaments. Additionally, some secondary tours offer Tour Cards. These are secondary Orders of Merit are the:

- Pro Tour Order of Merit, which counts money earned in Players Championships and European Tour events over a 12-month rolling period. In addition to qualification for televised tournaments, this ranking determines the seedings for Players Championship events.
- European Tour Order of Merit, which counts money earned in European Tour events during the calendar year. The top 32 on this ranking list qualify for the European Championship at the end of the year, where all players are seeded according to their European Tour ranking.
- Players Championship Order of Merit, which counts money earned in Player Championship events during the calendar year. The top 64 on this ranking qualify for the Players Championship Finals. Similarly to the European Championship, all players are seeded according to their rank.
- World Series Order of Merit, which counts points earned in a calendar year in the world series. The top 8 on this ranking are seeded for the World Series of Darts Finals.
- Challenge Tour Order of Merit, which counts money earned in a calendar year on the Challenge Tour, a secondary tour open to players without Tour Cards that participated in the most recent Q-School. Top ranked players at the end of the year may qualify for televised tournaments and receive Tour Cards, depending on their rank. The Challenge Tour Order of Merit also acts as a reserve list for Pro Tour events.
- Development Tour Order of Merit, which counts money earned in a calendar year on the Development Tour, a secondary open to some Tour Card holders and players without Tour Card aged 16–23. Top ranked players at the end of the year may qualify for televised tournaments and receive Tour Cards, depending on their rank.
- Women's Series Order of Merit, which counts money earned in a calendar year on the Women's Series, a secondary tour for female players. Top ranked players at the end of the year may qualify for televised tournaments, depending on their rank.
- Women's World Matchplay Order of Merit, which counts money earned on the Women's Series earned over an approximately 12-month period prior to the Women's World Matchplay, to which the top 8 players are invited.

Qualification and seedings to PDC events via PDC Orders of Merit
Tournament	Qualifiers (seeds)								
Tournament	By Order of Merit								Other
Tournament	Main	PT	ET	PC	WS	CT	DT	WO	Other
Ranked televised events
World Championship	40 (32)	40	—N/a			3	3	3	39
World Masters	24 (16) (Note: Players Ranked 25–56 will enter at the last 64 of the preliminary round, while Players Ranked 57–88 will be seeded in the preliminary round group stage, and Players Ranked 89–128 will enter at the preliminary rounded group stage non-seeded)	—N/a				(Note: The top 8 eligible players from the Secondary Tours holders enter at the preliminary round group stage)			8 (Note: The 8 qualifiers from the preliminary round.)
UK Open	TCH	—N/a				8	8	—N/a	16
World Matchplay	16 (16)	16	—N/a						
World Grand Prix	16 (16)	16	—N/a						
European Championship	—N/a		32 (32)	—N/a					
Grand Slam of Darts	0 (8)	—N/a				1	1	1	21
Players Championship Finals	—N/a			64 (64)	—N/a				
PDC Pro Tour
European Tour events	16 (16)	16	—N/a						16
Players Championship events	TCH	0 (32)	—N/a						
Non-ranked televised events
Premier League Darts	4	—N/a							4
World Series of Darts Finals	—N/a				8 (8)	—N/a			24
World Cup of Darts	(Note: Customarily, up to 2 Tour Card Holders are invited where possible from each nation, with priority for selection given to the highest-ranked players in the main Order of Merit. However, on some occasions (such as John Henderson's defence of Scotland's 2021 title), a lower-ranked player is invited. Where no Tour Card holders are available for a participating nation, players are invited directly by the PDC or through national qualifiers.)	—N/a							
Tour Cards	64	—N/a				2	2	—N/a	60 (Note: Players who have one year remaining of a two-year Tour Card and players qualifying through Q-school.)

== Previous world ranking system ==
Prior to 2007, a ranking point system was used where ranking points were awarded according to the stage reached in a tournament and the relative prestige of the tournament. There was no limit on the number of tournaments which counted to the tally, which meant that the top-ranked players were not necessarily the best-performing in the major tournaments. For instance, Colin Lloyd was the world number one player in the PDC for most of 2005 and 2006, despite most of the major titles being shared between Phil Taylor, Raymond van Barneveld and John Part.

PDC World Rankings Points System, 2003
Tournament Category	Winner	Runner-up	Top 4	Top 8	Top 16	Top 32	Top 40	Top 64
World Championship	50	40	35	30	24	16	12	(Note: 2, 4 or 6 points for players who reached the later rounds of qualifying.)
Premier Event	30	24	20	16	12	8	—N/a	(Note: For events with more than 128 players, 4 points.) (Note: 1, 2, or 4 points for players who reached the later rounds of qualifying for the World Matchplay.)
Category One	16	12	10	8	6	4	—N/a	(Note: For events with more than 128 players, 2 points.)
Category Two	8	6	4	3	2	1	—N/a	
Category Three	5	4	3	2	1	—N/a		

== Previous world number ones ==
PDC Ranking Leaders Timeline

14 players have held the position of World Number One since the World Darts Council started new rankings in 1993. Seven different players held the position in the old points system, and eight players have held the position since the PDC switched to the two-year earnings based Order of Merit system in 2007, with Phil Taylor being the only player to have been number one in both eras.

Notable players not to be ranked world number one in the PDC include: Two-time back-to-back PDC World Champions Adrian Lewis and Gary Anderson, 11-time major title winner James Wade and 2018 world champion Rob Cross.

Player	#	Years in which player stood Number 1
(England) Phil Taylor	13	1996; 2000; **2002**; 2003; **2004**; 2006; **2007**; 2008; **2009**; **2010**; **2011**; **2012**; **2013**
(Netherlands) Michael van Gerwen	7	**2014**; **2015**; **2016**; **2017**; **2018**; **2019**; **2020**
(England) Alan Warriner	6	1993; **1994**; **1997**; **1998**; 2001; **2002**
(England) Rod Harrington	5	1995; **1996**; 1998; **1999**; **2000**
(England) Colin Lloyd	3	2005; **2006**; 2007
(England) Dennis Priestley	2	1994; **1995**
(England) Peter Manley	2	2000; **2001**
(Wales) Gerwyn Price	2	**2021**; **2022**
(England) Luke Humphries	2	**2024**; **2025**
(England) Luke Littler	2	2025; **2026**
(Netherlands) Raymond van Barneveld	1	**2008**
(Canada) John Part	1	**2003**
(Scotland) Peter Wright	1	2022
(England) Michael Smith	1	**2023**
Italic indicates the player was reigning world champion that year **Bold** indicates the player stood number one at the conclusion of that year's world championship

=== Periods ===
No.	Player(s)	From		Length	Ref.
1	Alan Warriner	January 1993	Incarnation of the WDC	674 days (Note: Uses 1st of month where exact date unknown.)	
2	Dennis Priestley	6 November 1994	1994 Lada UK Masters	155 days	
3	Rod Harrington	10 April 1995	1995 UK Matchplay	479 days	
4	Phil Taylor	August 1996		31 days	
	Alan Warriner (2)	September 1996		699 days	
	Rod Harrington (2)	1 August 1998	1998 World Matchplay	728 days	
	Phil Taylor (2)	29 July 2000	2000 World Matchplay	57 days	
5	Peter Manley	24 September 2000	2000 Windy City Open	399 days	
	Alan Warriner (3)	28 October 2001	2001 World Grand Prix	69 days	
	Alan Warriner (4) and Phil Taylor (3)	5 January 2002	2002 World Championship	28 days	
	Alan Warriner (5)	2 February 2002	2002 Eastbourne Open	88 days	
	Phil Taylor (4)	May 2002		248 days	
6	John Part	4 January 2003	2003 World Championship	203 days	
	Phil Taylor (5)	26 July 2003	2003 Bobby Bourn Memorial Trophy	582 days	
7	Colin Lloyd	27 February 2005	2005 West Tyrone Open	469 days	
	Phil Taylor (6)	11 June 2006	2006 UK Open	7 days	
	Colin Lloyd (2)	18 June 2006	2006 Players Championship 3	197 days	
	Phil Taylor (7)	1 January 2007	2007 World Championship	365 days	
8	Raymond van Barneveld	1 January 2008	2008 World Championship	159 days	
	Phil Taylor (8)	8 June 2008	2008 UK Open	2,033 days	
9	Michael van Gerwen	1 January 2014	2014 World Championship	2,559 days	
10	Gerwyn Price	3 January 2021	2021 World Championship	427 days	
11	Peter Wright	6 March 2022	2022 UK Open	140 days	
	Gerwyn Price (2)	24 July 2022	2022 World Matchplay	77 days	
	Peter Wright (2)	9 October 2022	2022 World Grand Prix	21 days	
	Gerwyn Price (3)	30 October 2022	2022 European Championship	65 days	
12	Michael Smith	3 January 2023	2023 World Championship	365 days	
13	Luke Humphries	3 January 2024	2024 World Championship	683 days	
**14**	**Luke Littler**	**16 November 2025**	**2025 Grand Slam**	**268 days**	

Key

Before January 2007	Used old points system
**Current**	Reigning number one on Order of Merit

=== Total days at number one ===
No.	Player	Total Days at No 1	Longest Consecutive Run
1	Phil Taylor	3323	2033
2	**Michael van Gerwen**	2559	2559
3	Alan Warriner-Little	1558	699
4	Rod Harrington	1207	728
5	**Luke Humphries**	683	683
6	Colin Lloyd	666	469
7	**Gerwyn Price**	569	427
8	Peter Manley	399	399
9	**Michael Smith**	365	365
10	**Luke Littler**	**268**	**268**
11	John Part	203	203
12	**Peter Wright**	161	140
13	**Raymond van Barneveld**	159	159
14	Dennis Priestley	155	155
Active players in **bold**.

== First WDC/PDC rankings ==
Following the World Darts Council split from the British Darts Organisation between 1992 and 1994, the WDC drew up its first ranking list in the run-up to its inaugural 1994 World Championship. Mike Gregory and Chris Johns later went back to the BDO set up, and Bobby George and many of the non-UK players never competed in the early days of the WDC.

Ranking	Player	Ranking	Player
1	(England) Alan Warriner	16	(Denmark) Jann Hoffmann
2	(England) Rod Harrington	=	(Wales) Chris Johns
3	(England) Phil Taylor	=	(Netherlands) Roland Scholten
4	(England) John Lowe	19	(Netherlands) Raymond van Barneveld
5	(England) Mike Gregory	=	(England) Keith Deller
6	(England) Peter Evison	21	(England) Bobby George
7	(England) Kevin Spiolek	22	(Denmark) Per Skau
=	(England) Dennis Priestley	23	(Germany) Bernd Hebecker
9	(England) Bob Anderson	=	(Germany) Andree Welge
10	(Scotland) Jocky Wilson	=	(Belgium) Pascal Rabau
11	(Scotland) Jamie Harvey	26	(Belgium) Leo Laurens
12	(England) Eric Bristow	=	(Netherlands) Bert Vlaardingerbroek
13	(England) Cliff Lazarenko	=	(Republic of Ireland) Tom Kirby
14	(Sweden) Magnus Caris	=	(Australia) Wayne Weening
=	(England) Steve Beaton	=	(Finland) Mauro Levy
