= 1996 World Matchplay =

1996 Webster's World Matchplay

Tournament information
- Dates: 28 July–3 August 1996
- Venue: Winter Gardens
- Location: Blackpool
- Country: England
- Organisation(s): PDC
- Format: Legs
- Prize fund: £48,000
- Winner's share: £12,000

Champion(s)
- (England) Peter Evison

The 1996 Webster's World Matchplay was the third time the World Matchplay darts tournament had been held in the Empress Ballroom at the Winter Gardens, Blackpool between 28 July–3 August 1996.

Phil Taylor was the defending champion, but got knocked out by eventual champion Peter Evison by a convincing scoreline of 8–1 in the second round, with Evison averaging over 100. Evison would go onto to record another ton-plus average in the final against Dennis Priestley (who appeared in his third consecutive - and final - World Matchplay final).

== Prize money ==
The prize fund was £48,000.

Position (no. of players)		Prize money (Total: £48,000)
Winner	(1)	£12,000
Runner-Up	(1)	£7,000
Third place	(1)	£3,750
Fourth place	(1)	£3,250
Quarter-finalists	(4)	£1,650
Second round	(8)	£925
First round	(16)	£500

== Seeds ==
There were eight seeds for the competition.

1. (England) Phil Taylor
2. (England) Dennis Priestley
3. (England) Alan Warriner
4. (Scotland) Jamie Harvey
5. (England) John Lowe
6. (England) Bob Anderson
7. (England) Rod Harrington
8. (England) Keith Deller

== Results ==
Players in bold denote match winners.

=== Preliminary round ===
(best of 9 legs, but need a 2 leg difference.)

Player	Score	Player
**Mick Manning** (England)	5–0	(England) Garry Haynes
**Peter Manley** (England)	5–2	(England) Paul Cook
**Jerry Umberger** (United States)	8–6	(England) Darren Peetoom
**Ritchie Gardner** (England)	5–2	(England) Mark Sherwood
**Phil Gilman** (England)	5–3	(Netherlands) Frans Harmsen
**Bruce Robbins** (United States)	5–2	(England) John Moore
**Gary Mawson** (United States)	5–1	(England) Joe Holmes
**Tom Kirby** (Republic of Ireland)	7–5	(England) Nigel Justice

=== Last 32 ===
**First round** (best of 15 legs); 29–30 July
1	(England) **Phil Taylor** 89.07	**8**
Q	(Republic of Ireland) Tom Kirby 83.34	6
(England) **Peter Evison** 88.70	**8**
(United States) Larry Butler 81.24	3
8	(England) Keith Deller 72.24	7
(United States) **Sean Downs** 74.25	**9**
(England) **Cliff Lazarenko** 84.30	**8**
(United States) Gerald Verrier 81.33	2
5	(England) **John Lowe** 98.97	**8**
(England) Shayne Burgess 93.15	6
(England) **Dennis Smith** 81.69	**8**
(England) Eric Bristow 76.65	4
4	(Scotland) **Jamie Harvey** 80.91	**8**
Q	(England) Phil Gilman 83.10	5
(United States) Dave Kelly 82.89	2
Q	(England) **Peter Manley** 84.48	**8**
2	(England) **Dennis Priestley** 79.17	**8**
Q	(United States) Gary Mawson 77.49	4
Q	(United States) **Jerry Umberger** 74.91	**8**
(England) Steve Raw 76.98	5
7	(England) **Rod Harrington** 87.15	**8**
Q	(United States) Bruce Robbins 76.41	2
Q	(England) **Mick Manning** 90.15	**8**
(England) Paul Bratherton 75.24	4
6	(England) **Bob Anderson** 91.53	**8**
(United States) Steve Brown 81.30	3
(United States) **Paul Lim** 84.90	**10**
(England) Kevin Spiolek 83.61	8
3	(England) **Alan Warriner** 91.17	**10**
(England) Chris Mason 88.20	8
(England) **Graeme Stoddart** 79.62	**8**
Q	(England) Ritchie Gardner 77.58	2

**Second round** (best of 15 legs); 31 July
1	(England) Phil Taylor 94.65	1
(England) **Peter Evison** 103.77	**8**
(United States) **Sean Downs** 77.76	**8**
(England) Cliff Lazarenko 77.40	6
5	(England) John Lowe 89.97	5
(England) **Dennis Smith** 85.23	**8**
4	(Scotland) **Jamie Harvey** 84.84	**8**
Q	(England) Peter Manley 81.30	3
2	(England) **Dennis Priestley** 92.61	**8**
Q	(United States) Jerry Umberger 83.37	4
7	(England) **Rod Harrington** 92.25	**8**
Q	(England) Mick Manning 85.02	3
6	(England) **Bob Anderson** 87.66	**8**
(United States) Paul Lim 85.17	4
3	(England) **Alan Warriner** 92.01	**8**
(England) Graeme Stoddart 84.69	3

**Quarter-finals** (best of 21 legs); 1 August
(England) **Peter Evison** 90.54	**11**
(United States) Sean Downs 78.54	3
(England) Dennis Smith 81.12	6
4	(Scotland) **Jamie Harvey** 86.07	**11**
2	(England) **Dennis Priestley** 92.46	**15**
7	(England) Rod Harrington 91.08	13
6	(England) **Bob Anderson** 91.62	**11**
3	(England) Alan Warriner 87.90	8

**Semi-finals** (best of 25 legs); 2 August
(England) **Peter Evison** 89.16	**13**
4	(Scotland) Jamie Harvey 84.84	9
2	(England) **Dennis Priestley** 91.92	**13**
6	(England) Bob Anderson 87.30	11

**Final** (best of 31 legs); 3 August
(England) **Peter Evison** 100.51	**16**
2	(England) Dennis Priestley 96.67	14

Third place playoff (best of 21 legs) (Scotland) (4) Jamie Harvey 10–11 (6) Bob Anderson (England)
