= 1999 World Grand Prix (darts) =

Tournament information
- Dates: 20–24 October 1999
- Venue: Casino Rooms
- Location: Rochester, England
- Organisation(s): Professional Darts Corporation (PDC)
- Format: Sets "double in, double out"
- Prize fund: £60,000
- Winner's share: £9,000

Champion(s)
- Phil Taylor (ENG)

The 1999 World Grand Prix was the second staging of a darts tournament organised by the Professional Darts Corporation (PDC) and held at the Casino Rooms in Rochester, England from 20 to 24 October 1999.

The format changed to feature four groups of four players. As in the previous year, players had to start each leg by hitting a double - in addition to the traditional double to finish. The tournament was played in the format of best of five legs per set, rather than the best of three legs which had been adopted in 1998.

Phil Taylor retained the title, beating Shayne Burgess 6–1 in the final. Taylor's only close match came in the semi-finals, where he defeated Rod Harrington 5–4.

== Seeds ==
There were four seeds for the tournament.

1. (England) Rod Harrington
2. (England) Peter Manley
3. (England) Phil Taylor
4. (England) Shayne Burgess

== Group stage format ==
The format employed for this tournament meant that players could still qualify for the quarter-finals even if they lost either of their first two matches. The format was thus:

- Match 1: Player A v Player B
- Match 2: Player C v Player D
- Match 3: Winner of match 1 v Winner of Match 2 (winner goes into quarter finals)
- Match 4: Loser of match 1 v Loser of Match 2
- Match 5: Winner of match 4 v Loser of Match 3 (winner goes into quarter finals)

== Results ==
Players in bold denote match winners.

=== Group stages ===
20–21 October 1999

==== Group 1 ====
Matches 1–2
**Phil Taylor (3)** 90.15	**3**
Dennis Priestley 77.17	0
(England) **Alan Warriner** 80.05	**3**
Gary Mawson 81.13	0
Match 4
L1	**Dennis Priestley** 85.58	**3**
L2	Gary Mawson 76.29	0

Match 3
W1	**Phil Taylor (3)** 98.21	**3**
W2	(England) Alan Warriner 89.99	0
Match 5
L3	(England) Alan Warriner 86.98	2
W4	**Dennis Priestley** 93.72	**3**

90.15 (3) **Phil Taylor** (England)	**3** – 0	(England) Dennis Priestley 77.17
80.05 **Alan Warriner** (England)	**3** – 0	(United States) Gary Mawson 81.13
98.21 (3) **Phil Taylor** (England)	**3** – 0	(England) Alan Warriner 89.99
85.58 **Dennis Priestley** (England)	**3** – 0	(United States) Gary Mawson 76.29
86.98 Alan Warriner (England)	2 – **3**	(England) **Dennis Priestley** 93.72

==== Group 2 ====
Matches 1–2
**Peter Manley (2)** 85.51	**3**
Keith Deller 79.65	0
**John Part** 86.97	**3**
Graeme Stoddart 77.05	0
Match 4
L1	**Keith Deller** 78.75	**3**
L2	Graeme Stoddart 69.15	2

Match 3
W1	**Peter Manley (2)** 87.30	**3**
W2	John Part 77.85	0
Match 5
L3	John Part 74.79	0
W4	**Keith Deller** 74.39	**3**

85.51 (2) **Peter Manley** (England)	**3** – 0	(England) Keith Deller 79.65
86.97 **John Part** (Canada)	**3** – 0	(England) Graeme Stoddart 77.05
87.30 (2) **Peter Manley** (England)	**3** – 0	(Canada) John Part 77.85
78.75 **Keith Deller** (England)	**3** – 2	(England) Graeme Stoddart 69.15
74.39 **Keith Deller** (England)	**3** – 0	(Canada) John Part 74.79

==== Group 3 ====
Matches 1–2
**Shayne Burgess (4)** 90.79	**3**
(United States) Steve Brown 81.10	0
**Peter Evison** 71.97	**3**
(England) John Ferrell 66.93	0
Match 4
L1	(United States) **Steve Brown** 70.83	**3**
L2	(England) John Ferrell 71.32	1

Match 3
W1	**Shayne Burgess (4)** 88.06	**3**
W2	Peter Evison 79.69	1
Match 5
L3	**Peter Evison** 78.32	**3**
W4	(United States) Steve Brown 81.65	2

90.79 (4) **Shayne Burgess** (England)	**3** – 0	(United States) Steve Brown 81.10
71.97 **Peter Evison** (England)	**3** – 0	(England) John Ferrell 66.93
88.06 (4) **Shayne Burgess** (England)	**3** – 1	(England) Peter Evison 79.69
70.83 **Steve Brown** (United States)	**3** – 1	(England) John Ferrell 71.32
78.32 **Peter Evison** (England)	**3** – 2	(United States) Steve Brown 81.65

==== Group 4 ====
Matches 1–2
**Rod Harrington (1)** 89.62	**3**
Bob Anderson 78.99	2
**Chris Mason** 88.35	**3**
Paul Lim 85.07	1
Match 4
L1	**Bob Anderson** 83.61	**3**
L2	Paul Lim 80.80	2

Match 3
W1	**Rod Harrington (1)** 86.88	**3**
W2	Chris Mason 85.18	2
Match 5
L3	**Chris Mason** 90.35	**3**
W4	Bob Anderson 79.57	0

89.62 (1) **Rod Harrington** (England)	**3** – 2	(England) Bob Anderson 78.99
88.35 **Chris Mason** (England)	**3** – 1	(Singapore) Paul Lim 85.07
86.88 (1) **Rod Harrington** (England)	**3** – 2	(England) Chris Mason 85.18
83.61 **Bob Anderson** (England)	**3** – 2	(Singapore) Paul Lim 80.80
90.35 **Chris Mason** (England)	**3** – 0	(England) Bob Anderson 79.57

=== Knockout stages ===
**Quarter-finals** (best of 5 sets); 22 October
1	(England) **Rod Harrington** 84.51	**3**
(England) Keith Deller 79.57	0
3	(England) **Phil Taylor** 101.71	**3**
(England) Peter Evison 81.59	0
4	(England) **Shayne Burgess** 84.27	**3**
(England) Dennis Priestley 89.46	0
2	(England) **Peter Manley** 76.22	**3**
(England) Chris Mason 83.09	1

**Semi-finals** (best of 9 sets); 23 October
1	(England) Rod Harrington 86.39	4
3	(England) **Phil Taylor** 93.85	**5**
4	(England) **Shayne Burgess** 84.71	**5**
2	(England) Peter Manley 82.67	4

**Final** (best of 11 sets); 24 October
3	(England) **Phil Taylor** 92.59	**6**
4	(England) Shayne Burgess 81.26	1
