= Ritchie Gardner =

English darts player

Personal information
- Nickname: "Machine Gun"
- Born: 1958 or 1959 (age 67–68)
- Home town: England

Sport
- Sport: Darts
- Playing since: 1978
- Darts: 14 Gram Unicorn Signature
- Laterality: Right-handed

Organisation (see split in darts)
- BDO: 1982–1992
- PDC: 1992–2006 (founding member)

WDF major events – best performances
- World Championship: Last 16: 1987, 1988
- World Masters: Quarter final: 1990

PDC premier events – best performances
- World Championship: Last 24 group: 1994, 1995, 1996, 1997
- World Matchplay: Last 32: 1994, 1995, 1996, 1998

Other tournament wins
- Tournament: Years
- Belgium Open MFI World Pairs: 1984; 1988

Richard Gardner (born 1958/1959) is an English former professional darts player who had some success during the 1980s, and was one of the 16 top players who formed a breakaway organisation during an acrimonious split in the game during 1992–94.

== Career ==
Gardner showed some promise during early days of televised darts – although the only title he won was the Belgium Open in 1984, which was a non-televised event. He reached the last 16 of the Winmau World Masters in 1985 and then qualified for the World Professional Darts Championship for the first time in 1986 where he lost in the first round to Terry O'Dea. It was the first year the tournament was staged at the Lakeside Country Club.

He failed to progress beyond the second round in his visits to Lakeside, but did come up against some legends of the game including Eric Bristow, Jocky Wilson and Mike Gregory. He managed to reach the quarter finals of the World Masters in 1990 – but by this time, that tournament was no longer televised. Only the World Championship remained on the screens during that era, which was one of the reasons that many top players became unhappy with their lack of television exposure.

Gardner was amongst the group of 16 players who "defected" from the British Darts Organisation between 1992 and 1994 as one of the founder members of the World Darts Council (now the Professional Darts Corporation – PDC), and he received more television exposure between 1994 and 1999 at their World Championship, but never managed to progress beyond the group stages.

He also competed in the WDC/PDC's World Matchplay tournament in 1994, 1995, 1996 and 1998, but never won a single match. After the 1999 World Championship, he faded from the scene and no longer competes on the darts circuit; although he did compete at a couple of PDC Open events in Eastbourne in 2005 and 2006 but never progressed beyond the very early rounds.

== World Championship performances ==
=== BDO ===
- 1986 1st round (lost to Terry O'Dea 1–3)
- 1987 2nd round (lost to Mike Gregory 0–3)
- 1988 2nd round (lost to Eric Bristow 0–3)
- 1991 1st round (lost to Jocky Wilson 2–3)

=== PDC ===
- 1994 Last 24 group (lost to Alan Warriner 1–3), (beat Cliff Lazarenko 3–1)
- 1995 Last 24 group (lost to Bob Anderson 1–3), beat Jerry Umberger 3–1)
- 1996 Last 24 group (lost to Eric Bristow 2–3) & Dennis Priestley 0–3)
- 1997 Last 24 group (lost to Steve Brown 2–3) & Dennis Priestley 1–3)
- 1999 1st round (lost to Gary Mawson 0–3)

== Performance timeline ==
| Tournament | 1981 | 1982 | 1983 | 1984 | 1985 | 1986 | 1987 | 1988 | 1989 | 1990 | 1991 | 1992 | 1993 | 1994 | 1995 | 1996 | 1997 | 1998 | 1999 |
|---|---|---|---|---|---|---|---|---|---|---|---|---|---|---|---|---|---|---|---|
| BDO World Championship | Did not qualify | | | | | 1R | 2R | 2R | DNQ | | 1R | DNQ | | DNP | | | | | |
| Winmau World Masters | 1R | 1R | DNQ | 1R | 4R | 2R | 2R | 2R | DNQ | QF | 2R | DNQ | | DNQ | | | | | |
| British Professional | DNQ | 1R | 2R | 2R | DNQ | 1R | 1R | 2R | 2R | Not held | | | | | | | | | |
| MFI World Matchplay | Not held | | | DNQ | | | QF | DNQ | Not held | | | | | | | | | | |
| PDC World Championship | Not yet founded | | | | | | | | | | | | | RR | RR | RR | RR | DNQ | RR |
| World Matchplay | Not yet founded | | | | | | | | | | | | | 1R | 1R | 1R | Prel. | 1R | DNQ |
| News of the World | Did not participate | | | | | SF | Did not participate | | | | | | | | | | | | |

Performance table legend
| DNP | Did not play at the event | DNQ | Did not qualify for the event | NYF | Not yet founded | #R | lost in the early rounds of the tournament (WR = Wildcard round, RR = Round robin) |
| QF | lost in the quarter-finals | SF | lost in the semi-finals | F | lost in the final | W | won the tournament |

== Television appearances ==
=== Bullseye ===
In 1988, Gardner appeared on Bullseye scoring an impressive 325 in the Bronze Bully charity round. The £650 raised was donated to the body scanner appeal at Queen Alexandra Hospital in Cosham. He also won the MFI World Pairs with Jocky Wilson in 1988.
