= Darren Peetoom =

English darts player

Personal information
- Nickname: "Boom Boom"
- Born: 23 August 1969 (age 57) Rotherham, England
- Home town: Rotherham, England

Sport
- Sport: Darts
- Playing since: 1990
- Darts: 21g Unicorn Bob Anderson
- Laterality: Right-handed
- Walk-on music: "Don't Stop Me Now" by Queen

Organisation (see split in darts)
- BDO: 2011–2017
- PDC: 1996

WDF major events – best performances
- World Championship: Last 40: 2016
- World Masters: Last 144: 2015

PDC premier events – best performances
- World Matchplay: Last 40: 1996

Darren Peetoom (born 23 August 1969) is an English former professional darts player who competed in British Darts Organisation (BDO) events. He qualified for the 2016 BDO World Darts Championship.

== Career ==
Peetoom qualified for the 1996 World Matchplay, where he lost to Jerry Umberger in the first round. He qualified for the 2016 BDO World Darts Championship through the Hull qualifiers before losing to Kostas Pantelidis 3–2 in the preliminary round.

== World Championship results ==
=== BDO ===
- 2016: Preliminary round (lost to Kostas Pantelidis 2–3) (sets)
