= 1994 WDC World Darts Championship =

Tournament information
- Dates: 28 December 1993 – 2 January 1994
- Venue: Circus Tavern
- Location: Purfleet
- Country: England
- Organisation(s): PDC (WDC)
- Format: Sets; Final – best of 11
- Prize fund: £64,000
- Winner's share: £16,000
- High checkout: 160 Dennis Priestley

Champion(s)
- Dennis Priestley

The 1994 WDC World Darts Championship (known for sponsorship reasons as the 1994 Skol World Darts Championship) was held following 18 months of controversy within the sport of darts. After the 1993 BDO World Darts Championship, several players decided it was time to part company with the British Darts Organisation (who had always organised the World Championship) and form their own organisation. The new organisation was known as the World Darts Council (WDC). The WDC would later become the Professional Darts Corporation (PDC).

The WDC decided to introduce their own separate World Championship, with the inaugural tournament being staged before the BDO version. The 1994 Championship started on 28 December 1993, and finished on 2 January 1994. This started a tradition for the WDC/PDC World Championship to kick off before the new calendar year begins. The tournament was staged at the Circus Tavern, Purfleet, Essex.

Dennis Priestley became the first WDC World Darts Champion, winning the final 6–1 against Phil Taylor to add to his 6–0 whitewash victory over Eric Bristow in the 1991 World Championship. 1994 was the last time that Phil Taylor would fail to win the World Championship until 2003.

== The 16 defectors ==
Originally 16 players "defected" from the BDO to form the WDC/PDC – Phil Taylor, Dennis Priestley, Rod Harrington, Alan Warriner, Peter Evison, Richie Gardner, Jocky Wilson, Eric Bristow, Keith Deller, John Lowe, Bob Anderson, Cliff Lazarenko, Kevin Spiolek, Jamie Harvey, Mike Gregory and Chris Johns.

However, Johns and Gregory returned to the BDO without ever competing at the PDC World Championship. They were replaced with Graeme Stoddart and Kevin Burrows and the field was brought up to 24 by adding eight players who are Larry Butler, Sean Downs, Gerald Verrier, Jerry Umberger, Jim Watkins, Dave Kelly and Steve Brown from North America and Tom Kirby of Ireland.

== Tournament and format ==
There were 24 players involved and the tournament featured an unusual round-robin format. The players were put into groups of three where the order of play was thus:

- Player A v player B
- Loser of match 1 v player C
- Winner of match 1 v player C

This was done so that there would usually always be something to play for in the last group game.

The group winner would progress to the quarter-finals (best of seven sets) and the tournament then became a straight knock-out event. The semi-finals were the best of 9 sets and the final was best of 11 sets.

== Seeds ==
1. (England) Dennis Priestley
2. (England) Alan Warriner
3. (England) Bob Anderson
4. (England) Peter Evison
5. (England) Rod Harrington
6. (England) Phil Taylor
7. (England) Kevin Spiolek
8. (England) John Lowe

== Prize money ==
The prize money for the tournament was £64,000 – significantly less than the 1994 BDO World Championship which featured a £136,100 prize fund.

Position (num. of players)		Prize money (Total: £64,000)	BDO equivalent prize money (Total: £136,000)
Winner	(1)	£16,000	£32,000
Runner-Up	(1)	£8,000	£16,000
Third place	(1)	£5,000	£7,700
Fourth place	(1)	£3,000	£7,700
Quarter-finalists	(4)	£2,500	£3,800
Second place in group	(8)	£1,500	£2,800 (Last 16)
Third place in group	(8)	£1,250	£1,900 (Last 32)

== Tournament review ==
=== Group stage ===
The majority of the major players came through the group stage without trouble. Phil Taylor eased past Jamie Harvey 3–1, and Jim Watkins 3–0 to win Group 1, while 1988 World Champion, Bob Anderson, cruised into the quarter-finals for a showdown against Taylor, after a series of 3–0 wins against Americans Gerald Verrier and Dave Kelly. But there was room for an American to upset the odds, as Steve Brown, surprisingly, took Group 3, with wins against 1983 champion Keith Deller and Kevin Spiolek. Alan Warriner would go through to meet him after a couple of 3–1 wins against Richie Gardner and Cliff Lazarenko. Peter Evison showed no signs of discomfort, with consecutive 3–0 wins over Jerry Umberger and Kevin Burrows, and two 90-plus averages to go with it; the second of which, 97.56, would be the highest three-dart average in the tournament. Rod Harrington also went through after winning group 6, though not without difficulty. After a 3–1 win over five time World Champion, Eric Bristow, he narrowly defeated Sean Downs by 3 sets to 2 to go through to the last 8. Group 7 would see three-time champion John Lowe bow out, who narrowed missed out in a tight group, which saw Tom Kirby from Ireland book a quarter-final place, despite suffering defeat in his opening match to Lowe. A 3–1 win over American Larry Butler, and Lowe's 3–2 loss to Butler, ensured the Irishmen's advancement. He would be up against Dennis Priestley, after the Yorkshireman saw off Jocky Wilson 3–2 and Graeme Stoddart 3–0 to book a quarter-final place.

=== Quarter-finals ===
In a battle of two former world champions, Phil Taylor defeated Bob Anderson 4–2. Steve Brown upset the odds again to defeat 1993 runner-up Alan Warriner 4–3 and book a meeting with Taylor in the semi-finals. Peter Evison continued his good form, recording another 90-plus three-dart average while beating Rod Harrington 4–1, while Dennis Priestley ended the run of Tom Kirby with a 4–2 win.

=== Semi-finals and third-place play-off ===
Brown's dream run finally ended in the semi-finals, as Taylor beat him 5–0 to reach his third world final. The scoreline seemed harsh on Brown, however, as both players finished with the same three-dart average (91.20). In the other semi-final, Priestley beat Evison 5–3, thus reaching his second world final. Brown capped off his impressive run in fine style, beating Evison 5–1 in the third-place play-off.

=== Final ===
The final turned out to be a one-sided affair, with Taylor rarely giving Priestley any trouble at all. Priestley raced into a 5–0 lead, and eventually won 6–1 to take his second world title.

== Results ==
=== Group stage ===
==== Group A ====
Pos	Player	P	W	L	SF	SA	+/-	Pts
1	(England) (1) Dennis Priestley	2	2	0	6	2	+4	4
2	(England) Graeme Stoddart	2	1	1	3	4	−1	2
3	(Scotland) Jocky Wilson	2	0	2	3	6	−3	0

26 December

95.24 (1) Dennis Priestley (England)	3 – 2	(Scotland) Jocky Wilson 94.39

27 December

77.24 Jocky Wilson (Scotland)	1 – 3	(England) Graeme Stoddart 78.20

28 December

86.25 (1) Dennis Priestley (England)	3 – 0	(England) Graeme Stoddart 86.80

==== Group B ====
Pos	Player	P	W	L	SF	SA	+/-	Pts
1	(Republic of Ireland) Tom Kirby	2	1	1	5	4	+1	2
2	(England) (8) John Lowe	2	1	1	5	5	0	2
3	(United States) Larry Butler	2	1	1	4	5	–1	2

26 December

89.95 (8) John Lowe (England)	3 – 2	(Republic of Ireland) Tom Kirby 87.68

27 December

89.18 Larry Butler (United States)	1 – 3	(Republic of Ireland) Tom Kirby 88.47

28 December

82.86 (8) John Lowe (England)	2 – 3	(United States) Larry Butler 81.24

==== Group C ====
Pos	Player	P	W	L	SF	SA	+/-	Pts
1	(England) (5) Rod Harrington	2	2	0	6	3	+3	4
2	(England) Eric Bristow	2	1	1	4	5	−1	2
3	(United States) Sean Downs	2	0	2	4	6	−2	0

26 December

89.23 (5) Rod Harrington (England)	3 – 1	(England) Eric Bristow 78.62

27 December

82.19 Eric Bristow (England)	3 – 2	(United States) Sean Downs 79.37

28 December

90.59 (5) Rod Harrington (England)	3 – 2	(United States) Sean Downs 83.88

==== Group D ====
Pos	Player	P	W	L	SF	SA	+/-	Pts
1	(England) (4) Peter Evison	2	2	0	6	0	+6	4
2	(United States) Jerry Umberger	2	1	1	3	3	0	2
3	(England) Kevin Burrows	2	0	2	0	6	−6	0

26 December

93.40 (4) Peter Evison (England)	3 – 0	(United States) Jerry Umberger 81.08

27 December

77.04 Kevin Burrows (England)	0 – 3	(United States) Jerry Umberger 81.06

28 December

97.55 (4) Peter Evison (England)	3 – 0	(England) Kevin Burrows 87.58

==== Group E ====
Pos	Player	P	W	L	SF	SA	+/-	Pts
1	(England) (3) Bob Anderson	2	2	0	6	0	+6	4
2	(United States) Gerald Verrier	2	1	1	3	3	0	2
3	(United States) Dave Kelly	2	0	2	0	6	−6	0

26 December

86.97 (3) Bob Anderson (England)	3 – 0	(United States) Gerald Verrier 82.90

27 December

72.44 Dave Kelly (United States)	0 – 3	(United States) Gerald Verrier 74.43

28 December

83.44 (3) Bob Anderson (England)	3 – 0	(United States) Dave Kelly 75.04

==== Group F ====
Pos	Player	P	W	L	SF	SA	+/-	Pts
1	(England) (6) Phil Taylor	2	2	0	6	1	+5	4
2	(United States) Jim Watkins	2	1	1	3	5	−2	2
3	(Scotland) Jamie Harvey	2	0	2	3	6	−3	0

26 December

92.57 (6) Phil Taylor (England)	3 – 1	(Scotland) Jamie Harvey 90.71

27 December

91.36 Jamie Harvey (Scotland)	2 – 3	(United States) Jim Watkins 87.91

28 December

80.50 (6) Phil Taylor (England)	3 – 0	(United States) Jim Watkins 78.00

==== Group G ====
Pos	Player	P	W	L	SF	SA	+/-	Pts
1	(United States) Steve Brown	2	2	0	6	1	+5	4
2	(England) (7) Kevin Spiolek	2	1	1	3	4	−1	2
3	(England) Keith Deller	2	0	2	2	6	−4	0

26 December

85.49 (7) Kevin Spiolek (England)	3 – 1	(England) Keith Deller 88.54

27 December

85.92 Steve Brown (United States)	3 – 1	(England) Keith Deller 84.57

28 December

84.05 (7) Kevin Spiolek (England)	0 – 3	(United States) Steve Brown 92.60

==== Group H ====
Pos	Player	P	W	L	SF	SA	+/-	Pts
1	(England) (2) Alan Warriner	2	2	0	6	2	+4	4
2	(England) Ritchie Gardner	2	1	1	4	4	0	2
3	(England) Cliff Lazarenko	2	0	2	2	6	−4	0

26 December

87.93 (2) Alan Warriner (England)	3 – 1	(England) Ritchie Gardner 81.00

27 December

75.43 Ritchie Gardner (England)	3 – 1	(England) Cliff Lazarenko 77.63

28 December

85.76 (2) Alan Warriner (England)	3 – 1	(England) Cliff Lazarenko 85.57

=== Knockout stages ===
Quarter-finals (best of 7 sets); 31 December
A1	(England) Dennis Priestley (1) 90.92	4
B1	(Republic of Ireland) Tom Kirby 84.02	2
C1	(England) Rod Harrington (5) 89.36	1
D1	(England) Peter Evison (4) 88.80	4
E1	(England) Bob Anderson (3) 90.73	2
F1	(England) Phil Taylor (6) 90.22	4
H1	(United States) Steve Brown 88.12	4
G1	(England) Alan Warriner (2) 87.69	3

Semi-finals (best of 9 sets); 1 January
A1	(England) Dennis Priestley (1) 89.56	5
D1	(England) Peter Evison (4) 82.44	3
F1	(England) Phil Taylor (6) 91.20	5
G1	(United States) Steve Brown 89.55	0

Final (best of 11 sets); 2 January
A1	(England) Dennis Priestley (1) 94.38	6
F1	(England) Phil Taylor (6) 85.62	1
Third-place play-off (best of 9 sets)
D1	(England) Peter Evison (4) 84.48	1
G1	(United States) Steve Brown 89.04	5
