= Phil Gilman =

English darts player

Personal information
- Full name: Phillip Gilman
- Born: 25 December 1965 (age 60) Grimsby, England
- Home town: London, England

Sport
- Sport: Darts
- Playing since: 1984
- Darts: 19g datadart signature
- Laterality: Right-handed
- Walk-on music: "When The Going Gets Tough" by Billy Ocean

Organisation (see split in darts)
- BDO: 1991–1992
- PDC: 1996, 2006

WDF major events – best performances
- World Masters: Last 16: 1992

PDC premier events – best performances
- World Matchplay: Last 32: 1996

Other tournament wins
- Tournament: Years
- London Classic British Open: 1991; 1992

Phillip Gilman (born 25 December 1965) is a former English professional darts player.

== Darts career ==
Gilman won the 1991 London Classic darts tournament champion beating Stephen Woodfield of Wales in the final.

Gilman rose to prominence by winning the prestigious British Open in 1992, beating Craig Clancy, Paul Dillon and Dennis Priestley in the final. He made his television debut on the hit game show Bullseye, competing in the charity bronze bully round, scoring 200 points. Despite his British Open success, Gilman never played at the BDO World Darts Championship, but did play in the 1992 Winmau World Masters beating Denmark's Jann Hoffmann in the third round before losing to Mike Gregory in the last 16.

Gilman then played in the 1996 PDC World Matchplay losing in the first round to Jamie Harvey. He then disappeared from the scene before briefly returning to the PDC scene in 2006, playing the JR+Vauxhall Holiday Park Norfolk Open, losing in the first round to Peter Allen. Gilman Quit the PDC in 2006.
