= WDC UK Matchplay =

Professional darts tournament

UK Matchplay
- Sport: Darts
- Founded: 1993
- Folded: 1996
- Country: England
- Venues: Chesterfield (1993); Sheffield (1994); Doncaster (1995-96)
- Last champion: (England) Phil Taylor (1996)
- Tournament format: Legs; Quadro board

The WDC UK Matchplay was a professional darts tournament held from 1993 to 1996. Broadcast on ITV's Yorkshire Television and later on Sky Sports, it was one of the inaugural series of events established by the then-World Darts Council, along with the Lada UK Masters and Samson Darts Classic. These events, plus the WDC's World Championship and World Matchplay tournaments from 1994, became a big part of the BDO's decision to ban the WDC's 16 players from darts competitions worldwide, and began a four-year legal battle known as the split in darts.

The event initially featured the top 15 WDC 'rebel' players, along with the winner of an open qualifier, but was later changed to feature fourteen automatic players and two qualifiers.

As with the UK Masters (which had used the equal darts format), the WDC sought to differentiate the tournament from the others on their calendar. To do this, they introduced the Harrows "Quadro 240" dartboard, which had an extra scoring ring halfway between the treble ring and the bullseye that was worth quadruple points. Thus, the maximum number of points that could be scored in a single turn was 240, and the highest possible checkout was 210. This was designed to provide an innovation not previously seen in televised darts, and attracted mixed reviews in the press.

Several players, including Jocky Wilson, Phil Taylor, Shayne Burgess, Bob Anderson and Peter Evison, scored a 240 maximum in the event. Bob Anderson checked out a 180 outshot in the 1994 final and Phil Taylor hit an outshot of 188 in the 1996 final. The tournament also carried a £100,000 bonus prize for hitting a record seven-dart finish. No one achieved this, though John Lowe came within one dart of a nine-dart finish in the 1993 event.

Despite being listed in at least one national newspaper as part of the WDC/PDC calendar for 1997, the event was discontinued following the 1996 iteration.

== Finals ==
Year	Winner	Score	Runner up	Total prize fund	Winner's share	Venue	Source
1993	(England) Dennis Priestley	6–1 (legs)	(Scotland) Jocky Wilson	£17,000	£5,000	Aquarius Club, Chesterfield	
1994	(England) Dennis Priestley	7–5	(England) Bob Anderson	£23,000	£5,000	Utilita Arena, Sheffield	
1995	(England) Alan Warriner	6–4	(England) Rod Harrington	£23,000	£5,000	The Dome, Doncaster	
1996	(England) Phil Taylor	6–2	(England) Dennis Priestley	£23,000	£5,000	The Dome, Doncaster	
