= Tom Kirby (darts player) =

Irish darts player (1947–2008)

Personal information
- Full name: Thomas Kirby
- Nickname: "The Irish Rover"
- Born: 21 January 1947 Maynooth, County Kildare, Ireland
- Died: 1 December 2008 (aged 61) Blanchardstown, Ireland

Sport
- Sport: Darts
- Playing since: 1967
- Darts: 19g Datadart
- Laterality: Right-handed
- Walk-on music: "The Irish Rover" by The Pogues and The Dubliners

Organisation (see split in darts)
- BDO: 1987–1993
- PDC: 1993–1996, 2002–2007

WDF major events – best performances
- World Masters: Last 64: 1987

PDC premier events – best performances
- World Championship: Quarter Finals: 1994
- World Matchplay: Last 16: 1995
- World Grand Prix: Last 32: 2005
- UK Open: Last 64: 2004, 2006

Other tournament wins
- Tournament: Years
- Malta Open Torremolinos Open Northern Ireland Open Kent Masters O'Shea Cup Men's Singles: 1987; 1991; 2002; 2004; 2006

Thomas Kirby (21 January 1947 – 1 December 2008) was an Irish professional darts player who has competed in the Professional Darts Corporation (PDC) events in the 1990s and 2000s.

Kirby reached the quarter-finals at the 1994 WDC (now PDC) World Championship, and the last 16 at the 1995 World Matchplay.

== Career ==
Kirby was the first Irishman man to join the Professional Darts Corporation (then known as the World Darts Council) and entered its inaugural World Championship in 1994, where he won Group 7 by set difference ahead of John Lowe to reach the quarter finals, losing to eventual winner Dennis Priestley. Kirby also reached the quarter finals of the 1994 WDC UK Matchplay, beating Cliff Lazarenko in the first round before losing to Jamie Harvey.

Kirby made two more appearances at the World Championship in 1995 and 1996 but lost out in the group stages. He also played in three World Matchplays, losing in the first round in 1994 and 1996 to Phil Taylor. Kirby won his first round match in 1995 against Sean Downs before losing in the second round to John Lowe.

Kirby then quietly disappeared from the sport but resurfaced in 2002, entering UK Open regionals. He then played in the 2003 UK Open, but lost in the preliminary round. In 2004, Kirby reached the quarter finals of the Irish Masters where he lost to Peter Manley. Kirby then returned to the UK Open the same year, reaching the third round where he lost to Colin Lloyd. He also reached the quarter finals of the Northern Ireland Open, a WDF ranked event.

Kirby qualified for the 2005 World Grand Prix in Dublin. Despite a brave effort, he lost in the first round to then-reigning champion Lloyd. Good performances in the regional finals of the 2006 UK Open earned him a spot in the third round proper but lost to Andy Callaby.

Kirby left the PDC in January 2007.

== Death and legacy ==
Kirby died in Blanchardstown from pancreatic cancer aged 61. A PDC tournament, the Irish Matchplay, was renamed the Tom Kirby Memorial Trophy in his honour. The winner of the event qualifies for the PDC World Darts Championship.

== World Championship results ==
=== PDC ===
- 1994: Quarter Finals: (lost to Dennis Priestley 2–4) (sets)
- 1995: Last 24 group: (lost to Dennis Smith 1–3) & (lost to Alan Warriner-Little 2–3)
- 1996: Last 24 group: (lost to Dennis Smith 1–3) & (lost to John Lowe 1–3)
- 1997: Preliminary round: (lost to Paul Lim 2–3)
