= Alan Warriner-Little =

English darts player (born 1962)

Personal information
- Nicknames: The Iceman; Wozza
- Born: 24 March 1962 (age 64) Lancaster, Lancashire, England
- Home town: Maryport, Cumbria, England

Sport
- Sport: Darts
- Playing since: 1989
- Darts: 22g RedDragon
- Laterality: Right-handed
- Walk-on music: "Cold as Ice" by Foreigner

Organisation (see split in darts)
- BDO: 1985–1993
- PDC: 1993–2009 (Founding Member)

WDF major events – best performances
- World Championship: Runner-up: 1993
- World Masters: Runner-up: 1998
- Dutch Open: Winner (3): 1989, 1993, 1998

PDC premier events – best performances
- World Championship: Semi-final: 1999, 2003
- World Matchplay: Runner-up: 1997, 2000
- World Grand Prix: Winner (1): 2001
- UK Open: Quarter-final: 2004

WSDT major events – best performances
- World Championship: Last 24: 2022

Other tournament wins
- Tournament: Years
- British Matchplay Atlantic City Open Belgium Open Boston Pro British Open British Pentathlon Cleveland Darts Extraveganza England Open Finnish Open German Open Isle of Man Open Jersey Festival of Darts North American Open PDC Eastbourne Open PDC Scottish Masters WDC UK Matchplay Witch City Open: 1990; 1996; 1989, 1990; 2000; 1990; 1988; 1999 1998; 1993; 1998; 1986; 2000; 1992; 2002; 1997; 1995; 2000

Other achievements
- PDC World Number 1 BDO World Number 1 WDF World Number 1

Alan Warriner-Little (born Warriner; 24 March 1962) is an English former professional darts player. Nicknamed the Iceman, he is a former World Grand Prix champion and a former runner-up at the World Professional Darts Championship.

== Darts career ==
Before coming to prominence as a darts professional, Warriner-Little appeared as a contestant in a 1987 edition of the ITV gameshow Bullseye whilst working as a State Enrolled Nurse at Lancaster Moor Hospital. He scored 257 the following year when he was invited back to throw for charity.

He made his World Championship debut in 1989, losing a second-round match to Jocky Wilson in a sudden-death leg, after missing eight match darts, with Wilson going on to win the tournament. Warriner reached the quarter-finals in 1991 and 1992, before reaching his first World Final in 1993 – but he lost 3–6 to John Lowe. This form took him to the top of the world rankings.

He joined the top players in the game when they separated from the BDO after that 1993 final.

Warriner-Little had a consistent record in the PDC World Darts Championship. He lost at the quarter-finals stage seven times (1994, 1996, 1997, 2000, 2001, 2004 and 2006) and reached the semi-finals twice (1999 and 2003).

He also was runner-up at the World Matchplay in 1997 and 2000, as well as in the World Masters in 1998.

In October 2001, he won the World Grand Prix. In that tournament he also recorded the highest winning three-dart average in double-start format (106.45) in his first round victory against Andy Jenkins 2–0 in sets. Three years later he was runner-up at the World Grand Prix.

As of 2026, Warriner is active in darts. He served as commentator for English broadcaster ITV until 2026 and has served as chairman of the Professional Darts Players Association.

== Personal life ==
Warriner was married to his first wife, Joanne, from 1987 to 1991, and married to his second wife, Kim, from 1991 to 2003. He married his third wife, Brenda Little, in the summer of 2005, and changed his name from Alan Warriner to Alan Warriner-Little. Warriner is a Manchester United supporter.

== World Championship results ==
=== BDO ===
- 1989: Second Round (lost to Jocky Wilson 2–3) (sets)
- 1990: First Round (lost to Mike Gregory 0–3)
- 1991: Quarter Final (lost to Bob Anderson 3–4)
- 1992: Quarter Final (lost to Kevin Kenny 0–4)
- 1993: Final (lost to John Lowe 3–6)

=== PDC ===
- 1994: Quarter Final (lost to Steve Brown 3–4)
- 1995: Group Stage (finished second in Group 4 behind Dennis Smith)
- 1996: Quarter Final (lost to Dennis Priestley 1–4)
- 1997: Quarter Final (lost to Eric Bristow 3–5)
- 1998: Group Stage (finished bottom in Group 8)
- 1999: Semi Final (lost to Phil Taylor 3–5)
- 2000: Quarter Final (lost to Phil Taylor 0–5)
- 2001: Quarter Final (lost to John Part 1–4)
- 2002: Second Round (lost to Colin Lloyd 4–6)
- 2003: Semi Final (lost to Phil Taylor 1–6)
- 2004: Quarter Final (lost to Phil Taylor 1–5)
- 2005: Third Round (lost to Paul Williams 1–4)
- 2006: Quarter Final (lost to Wayne Mardle 0–5)
- 2007: First Round (lost to Alan Tabern 0–3)
- 2008: Second Round (lost to Peter Manley 1–4)

== Career finals ==
=== BDO major finals ===
Warriner-Little appeared in three BDO major finals and has won one title.

Legend
World Championship (0–1)
Winmau World Masters (0–1)
British Matchplay (1–0)

Outcome	No.	Year	Championship	Opponent in the final	Score
Winner	1.	1990	British Matchplay	(England) Bob Anderson	5–4 (s)
Runner-up	1.	1993	World Darts Championship	(England) John Lowe	3–6 (s)
Runner-up	2.	1998	Winmau World Masters	(England) Les Wallace	2–3 (s)

=== PDC major finals: 4 (1 title) ===
Legend
World Matchplay (0–2)
World Grand Prix (1–1)

Outcome	No.	Year	Championship	Opponent in the final	Score
Runner-up	1.	1997	World Matchplay	Phil Taylor	11–16 (l)
Runner-up	2.	2000	World Matchplay (2)	Phil Taylor	12–18 (l)
Winner	1.	2001	World Grand Prix	Roland Scholten	8–2 (s)
Runner-up	3.	2004	World Grand Prix	Colin Lloyd	3–7 (s)

== Performance timeline ==
BDO

Tournament	1988	1989	1990	1991	1992	1993	1994	1995	1996	1997	1998	1999
BDO World Championship	DNP	L16	L32	QF	QF	RU	No longer a BDO Member					
Winmau World Masters	DNP	L16	L16	QF	SF	DNP					RU	L32
British Matchplay	DNP		W	SF	DNP							
British Professional	L32	Not held										

WDF majors performances
Tournament	Event	World Cup 1989	Euro Cup 1990	World Cup 1991	Euro Cup 1992
WDF World Cup & WDF Europe Cup	Singles	L16	DNP	QF	SF
WDF World Cup & WDF Europe Cup	Pairs	Prelim.	DNP	L64	SF
WDF World Cup & WDF Europe Cup	Team	SF	DNP	W	W
WDF World Cup & WDF Europe Cup	Overall	W	DNP	W	W

PDC

Tournament	1994	1995	1996	1997	1998	1999	2000	2001	2002	2003	2004	2005	2006	2007	2008
PDC World Championship	QF	RR	QF	QF	RR	SF	QF	QF	L16	SF	QF	L32	QF	L64	L32
World Matchplay	L16	L16	QF	RU	L16	L16	RU	L16	L16	QF	L16	L32	L32	L32	DNP
World Grand Prix	NYF				L16	L16G	QF	W	L32	QF	RU	L32	L32	DNP	
Las Vegas Desert Classic	Not held								L16	QF	L16	L32	DNP		
UK Open	Not held									L64	QF	L96	L64	L96	L64

Performance Table Legend
W	Won the tournament	RU	Runner-up	SF	Semifinalist	QF	Quarterfinalist	#R; RR; L#	Lost in # round Round-robin; Last # stage	DQ	Disqualified
DNQ	Did not qualify	DNP	Did not participate	WD	Withdrew	NH	Tournament not held	#R; RR; L#	Lost in # round Round-robin; Last # stage	NYF	Not yet founded

Sporting positions
Preceded by Initial ranking Phil Taylor; Peter Manley	PDC World Number One; January 1993 – 6 November 1994; September 1996 – 1 August 1998; 28 October 2001 – 5 January 2002	Succeeded by Dennis Priestley; Rod Harrington; Phil Taylor
