= Jim Watkins (darts player) =

American darts player

Personal information
- Full name: James Watkins
- Born: September 25, 1954 (age 72) United States
- Home town: Schuylkill Haven, Pennsylvania, U.S.

Sport
- Sport: Darts
- Playing since: 1974
- Darts: 21g Voks Signature
- Laterality: Right-handed

Organisation (see split in darts)
- PDC: 1993–2006

PDC premier events – best performances
- World Championship: Last 24 Group: 1994, 1995
- World Matchplay: Quarter-Finals: 1994
- US Open/WSoD: Last 32: 2006

Other tournament wins
- Years
| Houston Open | 1988 |
| Syracuse Open | 2003 |
| Washington Area Open | 2004 |

James "Jim" Watkins (born September 25, 1954) is an American former professional darts player who played in Professional Darts Corporation (PDC) events.

== Career ==
Watkins was brought in to make up the numbers in the inaugural 1994 WDC World Darts Championship, and lost to Phil Taylor and Jamie Harvey. He also played the following year, losing both his first round matches.

He reached the quarter-finals in the inaugural World Matchplay in 1994, beating Steve Brown and Keith Deller, before losing to Rod Harrington.

== World Championship performances ==
=== PDC ===
- 1994: Last 24 Group (lost to Phil Taylor 0–3) and (beat Jamie Harvey 2–3)
- 1995: Last 24 Group (lost to Steve Brown 0–3) and (lost to Jamie Harvey 2–3)
