= Sean Downs =

American darts player (born 1967)

Personal information
- Nickname: "Mr America"
- Born: 6 February 1967 (age 59) Eugene, Oregon, U.S.
- Home town: Eugene, Oregon, U.S.

Sport
- Sport: Darts
- Playing since: 1987
- Darts: 24g Durro
- Laterality: Right-handed
- Walk-on music: "Jack & Diane" by John Mellencamp

Organisation (see split in darts)
- BDO: 1991–1993
- PDC: 1993–1999, 2004–2011, 2017–2018

WDF major events – best performances
- World Championship: Last 32: 1993
- World Masters: Last 64: 1991

PDC premier events – best performances
- World Championship: Last 24 Group: 1994, 1995, 1996, 1997
- World Matchplay: Quarter Finals: 1996

Other tournament wins
- Years
ADO Pat Murphy Open	2010
ADO Queen Mary Classic	2010
ADO Spring Fling	2010
Camellia Classic	1999
Las Vegas Open	1991
Oregon Open	1990, 1993
Windy City Classic	1993

Sean Downs (born February 6, 1967) is an American former professional darts player who has played in the Professional Darts Corporation (PDC) events.

== Career ==
Originally from Eugene, Oregon, Downs first competed in the BDO World Darts Championship in 1993, where he lost 3-0 to Albert Anstey of Canada.

After switching to the PDC, he was brought in to make up the numbers in the inaugural 1994 WDC World Darts Championship, and lost both his group matches to Eric Bristow and Rod Harrington. In the following three years, he would win one game and lose one game each year, never getting out of the group stages. He did make the 1996 World Matchplay quarter-finals after beating Keith Deller and Cliff Lazarenko, before losing to eventual champion Peter Evison.

Downs quit the PDC in 2018.

== World Championship performances ==
=== BDO ===
- 1993: First round (lost to Albert Anstey 0–3) (sets)

=== PDC ===
- 1994: Last 24 group (lost to Eric Bristow 2–3) and (lost to Rod Harrington 2–3)
- 1995: Last 24 group (lost to Phil Taylor 1–3) and (beat Gerald Verrier 3–0)
- 1996: Last 24 group (lost to Keith Deller 2–3) and (beat Kevin Spiolek 3–0)
- 1997: Last 24 group (lost to Rod Harrington 1–3) and (beat Shayne Burgess 3–1)
- 1999: First round (lost to Harry Robinson 2–3)
