= Steve Brown (darts player, born 1962) =

American darts player

Personal information
- Full name: Stephen Brown
- Nickname: "Brownie"
- Born: July 15, 1962 (age 64) Carshalton, Surrey, England
- Home town: St. Louis, Missouri, United States

Sport
- Sport: Darts
- Darts: 22g Durro Signature
- Laterality: Right-handed

Organisation (see split in darts)
- BDO: 1985–1991, 2007–2013
- PDC: 1993–2006

WDF major events – best performances
- World Masters: Last 32: 1991, 2000
- Dutch Open: Winner (1): 1988

PDC premier events – best performances
- World Championship: 3rd Place: 1994
- World Matchplay: Quarter-final: 2000
- World Grand Prix: Last 16: 1998
- UK Open: Last 96: 2003
- US Open/WSoD: Last 128: 2008

Other tournament wins
- Tournament: Years
- North American Open Int'l Challenge of Champions Swiss Open Darts America Las Vegas Open Windy City Open Houston Open Malta Open Doubles Darts America Doubles Dutch Open Doubles Windy City Open Doubles Swiss Open Doubles North American Open Doubles Australian Grand Masters Doubles USA Darts Classic Doubles Houston Open Doubles Charlotte Open Doubles Virginia Beach Classic Doubles Dallas Int'l Classic Doubles: 1988 1988, 1989; 1989 1990, 1991; 1991; 2001; 2004; 2009; 1989, 1990, 1991; 1990, 1992; 1990; 1990 1991; 1994 1999 2003, 2009 2008; 2009 2009

Other achievements
- U.S.A. (ADO) Number 1 (1998, 1999, 2009, 2010) U.S.A. (ADO) Nat'l 501 Champion (1998); U.S.A. (ADO) Nat'l Cricket Champion (1999); National Darts Hall of Fame Inductee (1997); Golden Harvest Hall of Fame Inductee (2004) NON-RANKED TOURNAMENT WINS Thames TV Cockney Classic 1986 & 1987; BDO Mayday Festival 1986 & 1987; Turnhout Open (BEL) 1987; Van de Ven Open (BEL) 1987; Antwerp Open (BEL) 1988 & 1989; Winmau Dutch Masters 1989; Flanders Open (BEL) 1989; Rotterdam Open (NL) 1989; Harskamp Open (NL) 1990; Venlo Open (NL) 1990; Dongen Open (NL) 1991; Limmen Open (NL) 1991; Malta Champion of Champions 1991; St. Pat's Cricket Singles (MO) 1994–2005, 2008, 2010, 2013; NDAGB UK Doubles 1989 BDO Easter Gala Doubles 1986

Steve Brown (born July 15, 1962) is an American former professional darts player who had the majority of his success during the 1990s, when he finished third at the inaugural Professional Darts Corporation's version of the World Championship in 1994 – after the majority of top players decided to separate from the British Darts Organisation.

== Career ==
During that successful run in the 1994 PDC World Darts Championship Brown beat Kevin Spiolek, Keith Deller and Alan Warriner to reach the last four before losing heavily 0-5 to Phil Taylor. He then beat Peter Evison 5-1 in the third/fourth place play-off, a feature which is no longer staged in the event. Later in 1994, Brown also reached the semi-finals of the WDC Greene King U.K. Masters in Bury St. Edmunds.

Having played league darts from the age of 13, Brown made his debut for the Surrey County 'B' Team (in the British Inter-Counties League) in September 1978. After three years struggling to hold down a team place, he joined the London County squad in 1981, and by 1983, had become established in the London 'A' Team. In 1989 Brown received the great honour of being appointed London Team Captain, following in the footsteps of such illustrious names as Eric Bristow, Cliff Lazarenko, and Clive Pearce.

His first World-Ranked titles came in 1988 with wins at the Dutch Open and North American Open (which he retained the following year). Another particularly successful year was 1991, when he won the Swiss Open and Darts America, and also reached the final of the French Open, Malta Open and German Open. He was also a semi-finalist at the Belgium Open and a quarter-finalist in the Dutch Open. Despite this success, he never competed at the World Championship until the devastating split in the game. That was when the PDC (then known as the World Darts Council) field was boosted by a number of North American players who qualified for events alongside the 16 players who had left the BDO to form their own organisation.

He competed at the PDC World Championship each year between 1994 and 2004, but was unable to repeat the form he showed at that first event in 1994 – only reaching the last 16 in 1999 and 2000. His best performance at the World Matchplay came in 2000 when he made it to the quarter-finals but lost heavily to Ronnie Baxter.

Brown has also had success on the North American darts circuit reaching several World-Ranked finals including the 1998 Calgary Golden Harvest (losing to Rod Harrington), the 1999 Cleveland Darts Extravaganza (losing to Alan Warriner), the 2001 Blueberry Hill Open (losing to John Part), and the 2006 U.S.A. Darts Classic (losing to David Marienthal). He won the 2004 Windy City Open and was runner-up the following year, and most recently won the 2009 Houston Open. In fact, Brown is one of a very small handful of players to have won World-Ranked events in three different decades, and was also the first player to hold all three ADO National Championships simultaneously.

He is also the only American male to be inducted into both the US National Darts Hall of Fame, and the Golden Harvest International Darts Hall of Fame.

Brown lost out controversially on a place at the 2008 Lakeside World Championship. He made it to the semi-finals of the qualifiers in Bridlington – only to lose to Michael Rosenauer who then beat Swedish player Kenneth Hogwall to qualify for Lakeside. Rosenauer had also achieved qualification status for the PDC World Championship and elected to choose that championship instead – thus upsetting those players who he had knocked out of the qualifiers for the BDO version.

After a somewhat disappointing 2008, Brown returned to form the following year. In addition to finishing the year as ADO #1, he claimed a spot on the US World Cup team for the 2009 WDF World Cup which was held in Charlotte, North Carolina, US. This was Brown's third time on a US World Cup Team, following South Africa (1999) and Malaysia (2001). Brown also came close to qualifying for the 2010 BDO World Darts Championship by way of the BDO Invitational Table, and had he done so, would have been the first American ever to qualify for Lakeside via the rankings.

He competed at the 2010 World Masters, where he lost to Scotland's John Henderson in the third round, and again reached the semi-finals of the BDO World Championship playoffs, losing to eventual qualifier Jan Dekker. Brown finished 2010 ranked as US #1 (for the fourth time) by the ADO. In 2012, Brown was forced to miss a number of major US tournaments, but still finished 11th in the ADO National Rankings. This means that, since Brown's first full year on the ADO circuit (1993), he has never been outside the Top 12 – a run of 20 consecutive years. Also in 2012, he won the Men's Singles at the Blueberry Hill Open for a record sixth time.

== Personal life ==
Steve Brown lives in Loveland, Ohio, with his wife Missy. His favorite sports are speedway and football (soccer) – he supports AFC Wimbledon – and he also enjoys fishing, particularly catfishing. Other hobbies include cooking, classical music, and visiting cemeteries and graves of the famous. In addition to playing darts professionally, Brown is also involved in darts administration, currently serving as Communications Officer for the American Darts Organization. He had previously served five terms as Area 6 Manager.

Steve's father, Ken was also a noted darts player during the 1970s, and was the first player ever to play in an official international match. In March 1974, Ken represented a Great Britain (BDO) team which played against the USA in New York. He was first on, beating Nicky Virachkul 2-1. Ken Brown's best tournament result came in reaching the last 16 of the Winmau World Masters in 1976. He also represented England six times (winning five) including a Man-of-the Match performance against Wales in 1978 (his last England appearance), and partnered Sandra Gibb to victory in the Mixed Doubles event in Yorkshire TV's Indoor League.

== World Championship results ==
=== PDC ===
- 1994: 3rd place: (lost to Phil Taylor 0–5) & (beat Peter Evison 5–1)
- 1995: Last 24 Group: (lost to Jamie Harvey 3–1) & (beat Jim Watkins 0-3)
- 1996: Last 24 Group: (beat Graeme Stoddart 3-2) & (lost to Alan Warriner-Little 0-3)
- 1997: Last 24 Group: (lost to Dennis Priestley 0–3) & (beat Ritchie Gardner 3-2)
- 1998: Last 24 Group: (lost to Alan Warriner-Little 1–3) & (beat Harry Robinson 3-2)
- 1999: Last 16: (lost to Cliff Lazarenko 0–3)
- 2000: Last 16: (lost to Peter Manley 1–3)
- 2001: Last 32: (lost to Richie Burnett 2–3)
- 2002: Last 32: (lost to Peter Manley 1–4)
- 2003: Last 32: (lost to Phil Taylor 0-4)
- 2004: Last 40: (lost to Ritchie Buckle 0–3)

== See also ==
- List of darts players who have switched organisation
