= Kevin Spiolek =

English darts player

Personal information
- Nickname: "Speedo"
- Born: 5 May 1962 (age 64) Cambridge, England
- Home town: Cambridge, England

Sport
- Sport: Darts
- Playing since: 1986
- Darts: 23 Gram
- Laterality: Left-handed
- Walk-on music: "Song 2" by Blur

Organisation (see split in darts)
- BDO: 1987–1993
- PDC: 1993–2007 (Founding Member)

WDF major events – best performances
- World Championship: Quarter Final: 1993
- World Masters: Semi Final: 1987

PDC premier events – best performances
- World Championship: Quarter Final: 1995
- World Matchplay: Quarter Final: 1997
- UK Open: Last 128: 2005

Other tournament wins
- Years
| Isle of Man Open | 1993 |
| North American Open | 1994 |

Other achievements
- 1993 – Last player to beat Phil Taylor at World Championship outside the final until 2008

Kevin Spiolek (born 5 May 1962) is an English former professional darts player who played during the 1980s and 1990s. He made a brief return to form in 2006 when qualifying to play in the PDC World Darts Championship.

== Career ==
Spiolek's best form came in the late 1980s, when he reached the semi-finals of the 1987 Winmau World Masters, losing to Bob Anderson. In 1988, Spiolek reached the final of the prestigious News of the World Darts Championship, losing to Mike Gregory.

Spiolek is one of eleven players to have beaten Phil Taylor at the World Championship – having knocked him out in the second round at Lakeside in the 1993 World Championship – the last time that there was a unified World Championship. Spiolek was eliminated in the next round – to date, two quarter-finals are the best results he has achieved in World Championships.

Spiolek was one of the 16 players in 1992–1993 who created their own organisation (the World Darts Council which later became the Professional Darts Corporation). In 1994, he reached the final of the Greene King UK Masters – losing to Taylor. Spiolek played in the first seven PDC World Championships after the split in the game with his best performance being another quarter-final in 1995.

He reached the final of the North American Cup in 1996, and the quarter-finals of the World Matchplay in 1997, but then gradually faded from the scene. His performance in qualifying for the 2006 PDC World Championship (where he lost in the first round to Peter Manley) kept him in the top 100 of the PDC world rankings until January 2008.

He had continued to play in the domestic Pro Tour events on the PDC circuit during 2005 and 2006 – playing in more than 10 events on the PDC Pro Tour, but he has remained inactive on the circuit since the Players Championship in Gibraltar in January 2007.

== World Championship results ==
=== BDO ===
- 1993: Quarter-finals (lost to John Lowe 3–4) (sets)

=== PDC ===
- 1994: Last 24 Group (beat Keith Deller 3–1) & (lost to Steve Brown (USA) 0–3)
- 1995: Quarter-finals (lost to Peter Evison 1–4)
- 1996: Last 24 Group (lost to Sean Downs 0–3) & (lost to Keith Deller 2–3)
- 1997: Last 24 Group (lost to Dennis Smith 0–3) & (lost to Keith Deller 0–3)
- 1998: Last 24 Group (lost to Phil Taylor 0–3) & (lost to Dennis Smith 0–3)
- 1999: 1st Round (lost to Steve Brown (USA) 0–3)
- 2000: 1st Round (lost to Jamie Harvey 2–3)
- 2006: 1st Round (lost to Peter Manley 0–3)

== Career finals ==
=== Independent major finals: 1 (1 runner-up) ===
| Outcome | No. | Year | Championship | Opponent in the final | Score |
|---|---|---|---|---|---|
| Runner-up | 1. | 1988 | News of the World Championship | (England) Mike Gregory | 1–2 (l) |
