= Jerry Umberger =

American darts player

Personal information
- Nickname: "Tucker"
- Born: January 21, 1942 (age 84) Pottsville, Pennsylvania, U.S.
- Home town: Lavelle, Pennsylvania, U.S.

Sport
- Sport: Darts
- Playing since: 1962
- Darts: 26g
- Laterality: Right-handed
- Walk-on music: "Bad Moon Rising" by Creedence Clearwater Revival

Organisation (see split in darts)
- BDO: 1977–1993
- PDC: 1993–1997

WDF major events – best performances
- World Championship: Last 16: 1981, 1983
- World Masters: Last 32: 1981

PDC premier events – best performances
- World Championship: Last 24 Group: 1994, 1995
- World Matchplay: Last 16: 1994, 1996

Other tournament wins
- Years
| WDF Pacific Cup Mens Pairs | 1980 |
| WDF Pacific Cup Mixed Pairs | 1980 |
| WDF Pacific Cup Team | 1984 |
| Dallas International Classic | 1987 |
| Cleveland Extravaganza | 1980, 1996 |
| Houston Open | 1982 |
| Las Vegas Open | 1982 |
| Royal Hawaiian Open | 1982 |
| Syracuse Open | 1992, 1995 |
| Virginia Beach Classic | 1995 |
| United States Open | 1987 |
| Windy City Open | 1977 |
| Witch City Open | 1983 |

Jerry Umberger (born January 21, 1942) is an American former professional darts player who played in Professional Darts Corporation (PDC) events. He used the nickname Tucker.

== Career ==
From Pennsylvania, Umberger first competed in the BDO World Darts Championship in 1981, where he lost 2-0 to Cliff Lazarenko in the last 16, a round he would reach again in 1983, this time losing to Tony Brown.

Umberger runner up on 1981 Los Angeles Open but he lost to John Corfe of Wales.

After switching to the PDC, he was brought in to make up the numbers in the inaugural 1994 WDC World Darts Championship, and lost a group match against Peter Evison, before beating Kevin Burrows.

== World Championship performances ==
=== BDO ===
- 1981: Second round (lost to Cliff Lazarenko 0–2) (sets)
- 1982: First round (lost to Doug McCarthy 0–2)
- 1983: Second round (lost to Tony Brown 0–3)
- 1985: First round (lost to Alan Glazier 0–2)

=== PDC ===
- 1994: Last 24 Group (lost to Peter Evison 0–3) and (beat Kevin Burrows 3–0)
- 1995: Last 24 Group (lost to Bob Anderson 1–3) and (beat Ritchie Gardner 3-1)
