= 1992 WDF Europe Cup =

Tournament information
- Venue: Planet Funfun
- Location: Kerava
- Country: Finland
- Established: 21-24 October
- Organisation(s): WDF
- Format: Legs

Champion(s)
- Singles; Phil Taylor (men's singles) (Germany) Heike Ernst (women's singles); Pairs (Scotland) Ronnie Sharp & Jamie Harvey (men's pairs) (Wales) Rhian Speed & Sandra Greatbatch (women's pairs); Team; England (men's team); Overall; England (men's overall); Wales (women's overall)

The 1992 WDF Europe Cup was the 8th edition of the WDF Europe Cup darts tournament, organised by the World Darts Federation. It was held in Kerava, Finland from 21 to 24 October.

== Entered teams ==
16 countries/associations entered a men's selection in the event.

15 countries/associations entered a woman's selection in the event.

| Nr. | Country | Men's Selection |
|---|---|---|
| 1 | Belgium | Frans de Vooght, Jean Marie de Jonghe, Leo Laurens, Bruno Raes |
| 2 | Denmark | Per Skau, Jann Hoffmann, Per Eklund, Torben Christensen |
| 3 | England | Alan Warriner, Phil Taylor, Bob Anderson, John Lowe |
| 4 | Finland | Mauri Hakkala, Aulis Nissinen, Heikki Hermunen, Kexi Heinäharju |
| 5 | France | Jean-Luc Leclercq, Joel Chartier, Stephane Dalancon, Jean-Marc Siat |
| 6 | Germany | Andreas Krockel, Bernd Hebecker, Andree Welge, Kai Pfeiffer |
| 7 | Gibraltar | George Federico, John Neale, Francis Taylor, Roy Rodgers |
| 8 | Ireland | Finian Fox, John Joe O'Shea, Jack McKenna, PJ Moylan |
| 9 | Italy | Flavio Donda, Bruno Ladovaz, Edy Lineham, Giorgio Sartor |
| 10 | Netherlands | Hans Zeelenberg, Bert Vlaardingerbroek, Raymond van Barneveld, Paul Hoogenboom |
| 11 | Northern Ireland | Mitchell Crooks, Roy Baillie, Geoff Wylie, Dermott McGuiness |
| 12 | Norway | Arild Folgerø, Stein Jaeger, Svein Arne Hjelmeland, Øyvind Aasland |
| 13 | Scotland | Ronnie Sharp, Jocky Wilson, Peter Johnstone, Jamie Harvey |
| 14 | Sweden | Leif Øhrling, Richard Johansson, Reydar Henningsson, Mikael Armbladh |
| 15 | Switzerland | Stefan Aebi, Pierre Steiner, Walter Tschudin, Gaudenz Coray |
| 16 | Wales | Eric Burden, Martin Phillips, Peter Locke, Geoff Tucker |

| Nr. | Country | Woman's Selection |
|---|---|---|
| 1 | Belgium | Maria Vercnocke & Vicky Pruim |
| 2 | Denmark | Gerda Søgaard-Weltz & Lene Mikkelsen |
| 3 | England | Sharon Colclough & Sue Edwards |
| 4 | Finland | Sirpa Levanen & Paivi Jussila |
| 5 | France | Anne Kerneis & Laurence Le Bris |
| 6 | Germany | Astrid Kamm & Heike Ernst |
| 7 | Ireland | Joan Flynn & Breda Doyle |
| 8 | Italy | Maria-Grazia Maran & Cinzia Borgia |
| 9 | Netherlands | Francis Hoenselaar & Kitty van der Vliet |
| 10 | Northern Ireland | Nuala Coney & Rhonda Henry |
| 11 | Norway | Karin Nordahl & Kristel Olsen |
| 12 | Scotland | Cathie Gibson-McCulloch & Janette Youngson |
| 13 | Sweden | Jessica Larsson & Ewa Kristiansson |
| 14 | Switzerland | Sabine Beutler & Amparo Barbera |
| 15 | Wales | Rhian Speed & Sandra Greatbatch |

== Men's singles ==
1st Round (best of 7 legs)
(Wales) Eric Burden | 4
(Finland) Heikki Hermunen | 2
(Sweden) Reydar Henningsson | 4
(Northern Ireland) Dermott McGuiness | 3
(Republic of Ireland) Finian Fox | 4
(England) Bob Anderson | 3
(Italy) Bruno Ladovaz | 4
(Denmark) Per Eklund | 3
(Norway) Øyvind Aasland | 4
(Netherlands) Bert Vlaardingerbroek | 3
(France) Stephane Dalancon | 4
(Gibraltar) George Federico | 0
(Scotland) Jocky Wilson | 4
(Switzerland) Stefan Aebi | 1
(Germany) Bernd Hebecker | 4
(Belgium) Leo Laurens | 1
(Italy) Giorgio Sartor | 4
(Gibraltar) Roy Rodgers | 0
(Republic of Ireland) PJ Moylan | 4
(Switzerland) Walter Tschudin | 1
(Denmark) Jann Hoffmann | 4
(France) Joel Chartier | 2
(Northern Ireland) Mitchell Crooks | 4
(Sweden) Rickard Johansson | 3
(England) John Lowe | 4
(Finland) Mauri Hakkala | 1
(Scotland) Jamie Harvey | 4
(Wales) Peter Locke | 2
(Germany) Andree Welge | 4
(Netherlands) Raymond van Barneveld | 1
(Belgium) Frans de Vooght | 4
(Norway) Arild Folgerø | 1
(England) Phil Taylor | 4
(Denmark) Torben Christensen | 1
(Scotland) Ronnie Sharp | 4
(France) Jean-Luc Leclercq | 1
(Wales) Martin Phillips | 4
(Germany) Kai Pfeiffer | 1
(Italy) Edy Lineham | 4
(Norway) Svein-Arne Hjelmeland | 3
(Netherlands) Hans Zeelenberg | 4
(Switzerland) Gaudenz Coray | 1
(Republic of Ireland) John Joe O'Shea | 4
(Northern Ireland) Geoff Wylie | 1
(Belgium) Bruno Raes | 4
(Finland) Aulis Nissinen | 3
(Sweden) Mikael Armbladh | 4
(Gibraltar) Francis Taylor | 0
(Germany) Andreas Kröckel | 4
(Switzerland) Pierre Steiner | 1
(England) Alan Warriner | 4
(Republic of Ireland) Jack McKenna | 1
(Belgium) Jean-Marie de Jonghe | 4
(Italy) Flavio Donda | 0
(Wales) Geoff Tucker | 4
(Gibraltar) John Neale | 0
(Northern Ireland) Roy Baillie | 4
(France) Jean-Marc Siat | 2
(Denmark) Per Skau | 4
(Finland) Kexi Heinäharju | 2
(Norway) Stein Jæger | 4
(Sweden) Leif Øhrling | 2
(Netherlands) Paul Hoogenboom | 4
(Scotland) Peter Johnstone | 2

2nd Round (best of 7 legs)
(Wales) Eric Burden | 3
(Sweden) Reydar Henningsson | 4
(Republic of Ireland) Finian Fox | 1
(Italy) Bruno Ladovaz | 4
(Norway) Øyvind Aasland | 4
(France) Stephane Dalancon | 2
(Scotland) Jocky Wilson | 1
(Germany) Bernd Hebecker | 4
(Italy) Giorgio Sartor | 0
(Republic of Ireland) PJ Moylan | 4
(Denmark) Jann Hoffmann | 2
(Northern Ireland) Mitchell Crooks | 4
(England) John Lowe | 4
(Scotland) Jamie Harvey | 2
(Germany) Andree Welge | 4
(Belgium) Frans de Vooght | 0
(England) Phil Taylor | 4
(Scotland) Ronnie Sharp | 2
(Wales) Martin Phillips | 4
(Italy) Edy Lineham | 2
(Netherlands) Hans Zeelenberg | 1
(Republic of Ireland) John Joe O'Shea | 4
(Belgium) Bruno Raes | 4
(Sweden) Mikael Armbladh | 2
(Germany) Andreas Kröckel | 0
(England) Alan Warriner | 4
(Belgium) Jean-Marie de Jonghe | 4
(Wales) Geoff Tucker | 1
(Northern Ireland) Roy Baillie | 2
(Denmark) Per Skau | 4
(Norway) Stein Jæger | 3
(Netherlands) Paul Hoogenboom | 4

3rd Round (best of 7 legs)
(Sweden) Reydar Henningsson | 3
(Italy) Bruno Ladovaz | 4
(Norway) Øyvind Aasland | 3
(Germany) Bernd Hebecker | 4
(Republic of Ireland) PJ Moylan | 3
(Northern Ireland) Mitchell Crooks | 4
(England) John Lowe | 4
(Germany) Andree Welge | 1
(England) Phil Taylor | 4
(Wales) Martin Phillips | 2
(Republic of Ireland) John Joe O'Shea | 4
(Belgium) Bruno Raes | 1
(England) Alan Warriner | 4
(Belgium) Jean-Marie de Jonghe | 0
(Denmark) Per Skau | 3
(Netherlands) Paul Hoogenboom | 4

Quarter-finals (best of 7 legs)
(Italy) Bruno Ladovaz | 0
(Germany) Bernd Hebecker | 4
(Northern Ireland) Mitchell Crooks | 0
(England) John Lowe | 4
(England) Phil Taylor | 4
(Republic of Ireland) John Joe O'Shea | 1
(England) Alan Warriner | 4
(Netherlands) Paul Hoogenboom | 2

Semi-finals (best of 7 legs)
(Germany) Bernd Hebecker | 3
(England) John Lowe | 4
(England) Phil Taylor | 4
(England) Alan Warriner | 2

Final (best of 7 legs)
(England) John Lowe | 2
(England) Phil Taylor | 4

== Men's Pairs ==
1st Round (best of 7 legs)
(Sweden) Mikael Armbladh (Sweden) Reydar Henningsson | 1
(Germany) Andreas Kröckel (Germany) Andree Welge | 4
(England) Bob Anderson (England) John Lowe | 4
(Belgium) Jean Marie de Jonghe (Belgium) Frans de Vooght | 2
(Netherlands) Raymond van Barneveld (Netherlands) Bert Vlaardingerbroek | 4
(Italy) Giorgio Sartor (Italy) Bruno Ladovaz | 2
(Norway) Øyvind Aasland (Norway) Arild Folgerø | 4
(Republic of Ireland) Finian Fox (Republic of Ireland) Jack McKenna | 3
(Wales) Eric Burden (Wales) Martin Phillips | 4
(Northern Ireland) Dermott McGuiness (Northern Ireland) Roy Baillie | 2
(Denmark) Jann Hoffmann (Denmark) Per Eklund | 1
(Switzerland) Gaudenz Coray (Switzerland) Walter Tschudin | 4
(France) Joel Chartier (France) Jean-Luc Leclercq | 0
(Finland) Aulis Nissinen (Finland) Kexi Heinäharju | 4
(Scotland) Jocky Wilson (Scotland) Peter Johnstone | 4
(Gibraltar) George Federico (Gibraltar) Francis Taylor | 0
(Scotland) Ronnie Sharp (Scotland) Jamie Harvey | 4
(Finland) Mauri Hakkala (Finland) Heikki Hermunen | 2
(Wales) Peter Locke (Wales) Geoff Tucker | 4
(Norway) Svein Arne Hjelmeland (Norway) Stein Jaeger | 2
(Switzerland) Stefan Aebi (Switzerland) Pierre Steiner | 4
(Italy) Flavio Donda (Italy) Edy Lineham | 0
(Republic of Ireland) John Joe O'Shea (Republic of Ireland) PJ Moylan | 2
(Northern Ireland) Geoff Wylie (Northern Ireland) Mitchell Crooks | 4
(England) Alan Warriner (England) Phil Taylor | 4
(Germany) Bernd Hebecker (Germany) Kai Pfeiffer | 2
(Belgium) Bruno Raes (Belgium) Leo Laurens | 4
(Netherlands) Paul Hoogenboom (Netherlands) Hans Zeelenberg | 1
(Denmark) Per Skau (Denmark) Torben Christensen | 4
(Gibraltar) Roy Rodgers (Gibraltar) John Neale | 2
(Sweden) Leif Øhrling (Sweden) Rickard Johansson | 4
(France) Stephane Dalancon (France) Jean-Marc Siat | 2

2nd Round (best of 7 legs)
(Germany) Andreas Kröckel (Germany) Andree Welge | 1
(England) Bob Anderson (England) John Lowe | 4
(Netherlands) Raymond van Barneveld (Netherlands) Bert Vlaardingerbroek | 3
(Norway) Øyvind Aasland (Norway) Arild Folgerø | 4
(Wales) Eric Burden (Wales) Martin Phillips | 4
(Switzerland) Gaudenz Coray (Switzerland) Walter Tschudin | 1
(Finland) Aulis Nissinen (Finland) Kexi Heinäharju | 4
(Scotland) Jocky Wilson (Scotland) Peter Johnstone | 1
(Scotland) Ronnie Sharp (Scotland) Jamie Harvey | 4
(Wales) Peter Locke (Wales) Geoff Tucker | 0
(Switzerland) Stefan Aebi (Switzerland) Pierre Steiner | 3
(Northern Ireland) Geoff Wylie (Northern Ireland) Mitchell Crooks | 4
(England) Alan Warriner (England) Phil Taylor | 4
(Belgium) Bruno Raes (Belgium) Leo Laurens | 1
(Denmark) Per Skau (Denmark) Torben Christensen | 2
(Sweden) Leif Øhrling (Sweden) Rickard Johansson | 4

Quarter-finals (best of 7 legs)
(England) Bob Anderson (England) John Lowe | 4
(Norway) Øyvind Aasland (Norway) Arild Folgerø | 1
(Wales) Eric Burden (Wales) Martin Phillips | 3
(Finland) Aulis Nissinen (Finland) Kexi Heinäharju | 4
(Scotland) Ronnie Sharp (Scotland) Jamie Harvey | 4
(Northern Ireland) Geoff Wylie (Northern Ireland) Mitchell Crooks | 0
(England) Alan Warriner (England) Phil Taylor | 4
(Sweden) Leif Øhrling (Sweden) Rickard Johansson | 1

Semi-finals (best of 7 legs)
(England) Bob Anderson (England) John Lowe | 3
(Finland) Aulis Nissinen (Finland) Kexi Heinäharju | 4
(Scotland) Ronnie Sharp (Scotland) Jamie Harvey | 4
(England) Alan Warriner (England) Phil Taylor | 2

Final (best of 7 legs)
(Finland) Aulis Nissinen (Finland) Kexi Heinäharju | 3
(Scotland) Ronnie Sharp (Scotland) Jamie Harvey | 4

== Men's team ==
Round Robin

Group A

| Pos | Team | Pld | Win | Lose | LF | LA | +/- |
|---|---|---|---|---|---|---|---|
| 1 | England | 2 | 2 | 0 | 18 | 3 | +15 |
| 2 | Norway | 2 | 2 | 1 | 9 | 17 | -8 |
| 3 | (Republic of Ireland) Ireland | 2 | 0 | 2 | 11 | 18 | -7 |

- England 9 - 0 Norway
- England 9 - 3 (Republic of Ireland) Ireland
- Norway 9 - 8 (Republic of Ireland) Ireland

Group B

| Pos | Team | Pld | Win | Lose | LF | LA | +/- |
|---|---|---|---|---|---|---|---|
| 1 | Northern Ireland | 3 | 2 | 1 | 25 | 18 | +7 |
| 2 | Denmark | 3 | 2 | 1 | 24 | 23 | +1 |
| 3 | Scotland | 3 | 1 | 2 | 22 | 22 | 0 |
| 4 | Germany | 3 | 1 | 2 | 16 | 24 | -8 |

- Northern Ireland 9 - 6 Scotland
- Northern Ireland 9 - 3 Germany
- Denmark 9 - 7 Northern Ireland
- Denmark 9 - 7 Scotland
- Scotland 9 - 4 Germany
- Germany 9 - 6 Denmark

Group C

| Pos | Team | Pld | Win | Lose | LF | LA | +/- |
|---|---|---|---|---|---|---|---|
| 1 | Finland | 3 | 3 | 0 | 27 | 16 | +11 |
| 2 | Belgium | 3 | 2 | 1 | 24 | 18 | +6 |
| 3 | Sweden | 3 | 1 | 2 | 19 | 23 | -4 |
| 4 | Switzerland | 3 | 0 | 3 | 14 | 27 | -13 |

- Finland 9 - 6 Belgium
- Finland 9 - 5 Sweden
- Finland 9 - 5 Switzerland
- Belgium 9 - 5 Sweden
- Belgium 9 - 4 Switzerland
- Sweden 9 - 5 Switzerland

Group D

| Pos | Team | Pld | Win | Lose | LF | LA | +/- |
|---|---|---|---|---|---|---|---|
| 1 | Wales | 3 | 3 | 0 | 27 | 11 | +16 |
| 2 | Netherlands | 3 | 2 | 1 | 26 | 15 | +11 |
| 3 | Italy | 3 | 1 | 2 | 10 | 24 | -14 |
| 4 | France | 3 | 0 | 3 | 14 | 27 | -13 |

- Wales 9 - 8 Netherlands
- Wales 9 - 0 Italy
- Wales 9 - 3 France
- Netherlands 9 - 1 Italy
- Netherlands 9 - 5 France
- Italy 9 - 6 France

Knock Out

Semi-finals (best of 17 legs)
A1 | England | 9
B1 | Northern Ireland | 6
C1 | Finland | 2
D1 | Wales | 9

Final (best of 17 legs)
A1 | England | 9
D1 | Wales | 3

== Woman's singles ==
1st Round (best of 7 legs)
(Wales) Sandra Greatbatch | 4
(Netherlands) Francis Hoenselaar | 2
(England) Sharon Colclough | 4
(Switzerland) Sabine Beutler | 1
(Denmark) Lene Mikkelsen
Bye
(Republic of Ireland) Breda Doyle | 4
(Norway) Karin Nordahl | 1
(Belgium) Vicky Pruim | 4
(France) Laurence Le Bris | 2
(Finland) Paivi Jussila | 4
(Sweden) Jessica Larsson | 1
(Scotland) Janette Youngson | 4
(Northern Ireland) Nuala Coney | 1
(Germany) Astrid Kamm | 4
(Italy) Cinzia Borgia | 1
(Germany) Heike Ernst
Bye
(Belgium) Maria Vercnocke | 4
(Scotland) Cathie Gibson-McCulloch | 2
(Denmark) Gerda Søgaard-Weltz | 4
(France) Anne Kerneis | 1
(Finland) Sirpa Levanen | 4
(Italy) Maria-Grazia Maran | 0
(England) Sue Edwards | 4
(Sweden) Ewa Kristiansson | 0
(Northern Ireland) Rhonda Henry | 4
(Norway) Kristel Olsen | 2
(Netherlands) Kitty van der Vliet | 4
(Switzerland) Amparo Barbera | 0
(Wales) Rhian Speed | 4
(Republic of Ireland) Joan Flynn | 0

2nd Round (best of 7 legs)
(Wales) Sandra Greatbatch | 4
(England) Sharon Colclough | 1
(Denmark) Lene Mikkelsen | 4
(Republic of Ireland) Breda Doyle | 3
(Belgium) Vicky Pruim | 2
(Finland) Paivi Jussila | 4
(Scotland) Janette Youngson | 2
(Germany) Astrid Kamm | 4
(Germany) Heike Ernst | 4
(Belgium) Maria Vercnocke | 2
(Denmark) Gerda Søgaard-Weltz | 3
(Finland) Sirpa Levanen | 4
(England) Sue Edwards | 4
(Northern Ireland) Rhonda Henry | 0
(Netherlands) Kitty van der Vliet | 3
(Wales) Rhian Speed | 4

Quarter-finals (best of 7 legs)
(Wales) Sandra Greatbatch | 4
(Denmark) Lene Mikkelsen | 0
(Finland) Paivi Jussila | 0
(Germany) Astrid Kamm | 4
(Germany) Heike Ernst | 4
(Finland) Sirpa Levanen | 2
(England) Sue Edwards | 1
(Wales) Rhian Speed | 4

Semi-finals (best of 7 legs)
(Wales) Sandra Greatbatch | 4
(Germany) Astrid Kamm | 0
(Germany) Heike Ernst | 4
(Wales) Rhian Speed | 3

Final (best of 7 legs)
(Wales) Sandra Greatbatch | 1
(Germany) Heike Ernst | 4

== Woman's Pairs ==
Round Robin

Group A

| Pos | Team | Pld | Win | Lose | LF | LA | +/- |
|---|---|---|---|---|---|---|---|
| 1 | (England) Sharon Colclough (England) Sue Edwards | 2 | 2 | 0 | 8 | 2 | +6 |
| 2 | (Northern Ireland) Nuala Coney (Northern Ireland) Rhonda Henry | 2 | 1 | 1 | 6 | 5 | +1 |
| 3 | (France) Anne Kerneis (France) Laurence Le Bris | 2 | 0 | 2 | 1 | 8 | -7 |

- (England) Sharon Colclough & Sue Edwards 4 - 2 (Northern Ireland) Nuala Coney & Rhonda Henry
- (England) Sharon Colclough & Sue Edwards 4 - 0 (France) Anne Kerneis & Laurence Le Bris
- (Northern Ireland) Nuala Coney & Rhonda Henry 4 - 1 (France) Anne Kerneis & Laurence Le Bris

Group B

| Pos | Team | Pld | Win | Lose | LF | LA | +/- |
|---|---|---|---|---|---|---|---|
| 1 | (Denmark) Gerda Søgaard-Weltz (Denmark) Lene Mikkelsen | 3 | 3 | 0 | 12 | 6 | +6 |
| 2 | (Republic of Ireland) Joan Flynn (Republic of Ireland) Breda Doyle | 3 | 1 | 2 | 9 | 9 | 0 |
| 3 | (Finland) Sirpa Levanen (Finland) Paivi Jussila | 3 | 1 | 2 | 9 | 10 | -1 |
| 4 | (Germany) Astrid Kamm (Germany) Heike Ernst | 3 | 1 | 2 | 5 | 10 | -5 |

- (Denmark) Gerda Søgaard-Weltz & Lene Mikkelsen 4 - 3 (Republic of Ireland) Joan Flynn & Breda Doyle
- (Denmark) Gerda Søgaard-Weltz & Lene Mikkelsen 4 - 3 (Finland) Sirpa Levanen & Paivi Jussila
- (Denmark) Gerda Søgaard-Weltz & Lene Mikkelsen 4 - 0 (Germany) Astrid Kamm & Heike Ernst
- (Republic of Ireland) Joan Flynn & Breda Doyle 4 - 1 (Germany) Astrid Kamm & Heike Ernst
- (Finland) Sirpa Levanen & Paivi Jussila 4 - 2 (Republic of Ireland) Joan Flynn & Breda Doyle
- (Germany) Astrid Kamm & Heike Ernst 4 - 2 (Finland) Sirpa Levanen & Paivi Jussila

Group C

| Pos | Team | Pld | Win | Lose | LF | LA | +/- |
|---|---|---|---|---|---|---|---|
| 1 | (Wales) Rhian Speed (Wales) Sandra Greatbatch | 3 | 2 | 1 | 11 | 6 | +5 |
| 2 | (Scotland) Cathie Gibson-McCulloch (Scotland) Janette Youngson | 3 | 2 | 1 | 11 | 7 | +4 |
| 3 | (Norway) Karin Nordahl (Norway) Kristel Olsen | 3 | 2 | 1 | 10 | 8 | +2 |
| 4 | (Sweden) Jessica Larsson (Sweden) Ewa Kristiansson | 3 | 0 | 3 | 1 | 12 | -11 |

- (Wales) Rhian Speed & Sandra Greatbatch 4 - 2 (Norway) Karin Nordahl & Kristel Olsen
- (Wales) Rhian Speed & Sandra Greatbatch 4 - 0 (Sweden) Jessica Larsson & Ewa Kristiansson
- (Scotland) Cathie Gibson-McCulloch & Janette Youngson 4 - 3 (Wales) Rhian Speed & Sandra Greatbatch
- (Scotland) Cathie Gibson-McCulloch & Janette Youngson 4 - 0 (Sweden) Jessica Larsson & Ewa Kristiansson
- (Norway) Karin Nordahl & Kristel Olsen 4 - 3 (Scotland) Cathie Gibson-McCulloch & Janette Youngson
- (Norway) Karin Nordahl & Kristel Olsen 4 - 1 (Sweden) Jessica Larsson & Ewa Kristiansson

Group D

| Pos | Team | Pld | Win | Lose | LF | LA | +/- |
|---|---|---|---|---|---|---|---|
| 1 | (Netherlands) Francis Hoenselaar (Netherlands) Kitty van der Vliet | 3 | 3 | 0 | 12 | 2 | +10 |
| 2 | (Switzerland) Sabine Beutler (Switzerland) Amparo Barbera | 3 | 2 | 1 | 9 | 8 | +1 |
| 3 | (Belgium) Maria Vercnocke (Belgium) Vicky Pruim | 3 | 1 | 2 | 7 | 8 | -1 |
| 4 | (Italy) Maria-Grazia Maran (Italy) Cinzia Borgia | 3 | 0 | 3 | 2 | 12 | -10 |

- (Netherlands) Francis Hoenselaar & Kitty van der Vliet 4 - 1 (Switzerland) Sabine Beutler & Amparo Barbera
- (Netherlands) Francis Hoenselaar & Kitty van der Vliet 4 - 0 (Belgium) Maria Vercnocke & Vicky Pruim
- (Netherlands) Francis Hoenselaar & Kitty van der Vliet 4 - 1 (Italy) Maria-Grazia Maran & Cinzia Borgia
- (Switzerland) Sabine Beutler & Amparo Barbera 4 - 3 (Belgium) Maria Vercnocke & Vicky Pruim
- (Switzerland) Sabine Beutler & Amparo Barbera 4 - 1 (Italy) Maria-Grazia Maran & Cinzia Borgia
- (Belgium) Maria Vercnocke & Vicky Pruim 4 - 0 (Italy) Maria-Grazia Maran & Cinzia Borgia

Knock Out

Semi-finals (best of 7 legs)
A1 | (England) Sharon Colclough (England) Sue Edwards | 4
B1 | (Denmark) Gerda Søgaard-Weltz (Denmark) Lene Mikkelsen | 2
C1 | (Wales) Rhian Speed (Wales) Sandra Greatbatch | 4
D1 | (Netherlands) Francis Hoenselaar (Netherlands) Kitty van der Vliet | 0

Final (best of 7 legs)
A1 | (England) Sharon Colclough (England) Sue Edwards | 2
C1 | (Wales) Rhian Speed (Wales) Sandra Greatbatch | 4
