= Nordic Cup Open =

Tournament information
- Venue: Various
- Location: Various
- Country: Denmark; Finland; Iceland; Norway; Sweden
- Established: 1981
- Organisation(s): WDF
- Format: Legs

Current champion(s)
- Jani Laurila (men's); Rachna David (women's)

The Nordic Cup Open is a darts tournament held at various locations in five Nordic countries – Denmark, Finland, Iceland, Norway and Sweden. First edition of the tournament took place in 1981 in Espoo, Finland. Tournament was held as "Open", but only citizens and residents of this countries can take part in the tournament. Since 1981 tournaments was held every year. From 1996 to 2018 was held every second year. Last edition of this tournament was take place in 2022 after four years due the interruption caused by COVID-19 pandemic.

Among men, the tournament was most often won by representatives of Finland and Sweden, but the last victory of the Finnish player was recorded in 2004. Among women, the representatives of Finland achieved the greatest number of victories.

== List of tournaments ==
=== Men's ===
Year	Champion	Av.	Score	Runner-Up	Av.	Prize Money			Venue
Year	Champion	Av.	Score	Runner-Up	Av.	Total	Ch.	R.-Up	Venue
1981	(Finland) Kexi Heinäharju	n/a	beat	(Sweden) Bo Degling	n/a	n/a	n/a	n/a	(Finland) Espoo
1982	(Finland) Kari Saukkonen	n/a	beat	(Sweden)	n/a	n/a	n/a	n/a	(Sweden) Södertälje
1983	(Finland) Tapani Uitos	n/a	beat	(Denmark) Peter Stauby	n/a	n/a	n/a	n/a	(Norway) Klubben Hotel, Tønsberg
1984	(Sweden) Christer Pilblad	n/a	beat	(Finland) Arto Lintunen	n/a	n/a	n/a	n/a	(Denmark) Aarhus
1985	(Finland) Markku Pönnelin	n/a	beat	(Finland) Kexi Heinäharju	n/a	n/a	n/a	n/a	(Finland) Turku
1986	(Denmark) Michael Larsson	n/a	beat	(Finland) Sulo Suhonen	n/a	n/a	n/a	n/a	(Sweden) Södertälje
1987	(Denmark) Henning von Essen	n/a	beat	(Sweden) Stefan Lord	n/a	n/a	n/a	n/a	(Norway) Sandefjord
1988	(Denmark) Jann Hoffmann	n/a	beat	(Finland) Ari Kokko	n/a	n/a	n/a	n/a	(Denmark) Copenhagen
1989	(Finland) Harri Spora	n/a	beat	(Finland) Ari Kokko	n/a	n/a	n/a	n/a	(Finland) Helsinki
1990	(Denmark) Per Skau	n/a	beat	(Sweden) Stefan Lord	n/a	n/a	n/a	n/a	(Sweden) Upplands-Väsby
1991	(Sweden) Magnus Caris	n/a	beat	(Denmark) Jann Hoffmann	n/a	n/a	n/a	n/a	(Norway) Hamar
1992	(Finland) Heikki Hermunen	n/a	beat	(Denmark)	n/a	n/a	n/a	n/a	(Denmark) Lyngby
1994	(Denmark) Per Skau (2)	n/a	beat	(Norway) Thor Johansen	n/a	n/a	n/a	n/a	(Sweden) Borlänge
1995	(Sweden) Matti Rågegård	n/a	beat	(Sweden) Nils-Gunnar Manshed	n/a	n/a	n/a	n/a	(Iceland) Reykjanesbaer, Keflavík
1996	(Sweden) Jonas Bergström	n/a	beat	(Finland) Jarkko Komula	n/a	n/a	n/a	n/a	(Norway) Plaza Hotel, Oslo
1998	(Denmark) Frede Johansen	n/a	beat	(Sweden) Nils-Gunnar Manshed	n/a	n/a	n/a	n/a	(Denmark) Billund
2002	(Sweden) Markus Korhonen	n/a	beat	(Denmark) James Christoffersen	n/a	n/a	n/a	n/a	(Sweden) Lund
2004	(Finland) Marko Kantele	n/a	beat	(Denmark) Ole Jørgensen	n/a	n/a	n/a	n/a	(Iceland) Hverdagerdi
2006	(Norway) Øyvind Aasland	n/a	beat	(Norway) Jacques Langston	n/a	n/a	n/a	n/a	(Norway) Klubben Hotel, Tønsberg
2008	(Norway) Robert Wagner	n/a	beat	(Norway) Jacques Langston	n/a	n/a	n/a	n/a	(Finland) Tallukka Hotel, Vaaksy
2010	(Norway) Robert Wagner (2)	n/a	beat	(Denmark) Vladimir Andersen	n/a	n/a	n/a	n/a	(Denmark) Vejle
2012	(Denmark) Glenn Honoré	n/a	beat	(Denmark) Vladimir Andersen	n/a	n/a	n/a	n/a	(Sweden) Scandic Alvik, Stockholm
2014	(Denmark) Dennis Lindskjold	n/a	beat	(Sweden) Mats Andersson	n/a	n/a	n/a	n/a	(Iceland) Natura Hotel Icelandair, Reykjavík
2016	Daniel Larsson	n/a	beat	(Sweden) Tony Alanentalo	n/a	NOK 5,000	NOK 2,000	NOK 1,000	(Norway) Sundvolden Hotel, Krokkleiva
2018	Ricky Nauman	n/a	beat	Marko Kantele	n/a	€1,900	€800	€300	(Finland) Clarion Hotel, Helsinki
2022	Andreas Harrysson	77.53	5 – 4	Ricky Nauman	81.60	SEK 10,600	SEK 3,500	SEK 1,750	(Sweden) Scandic Triangeln, Malmö
2024	Björn Lejon	88.35	5 – 2	Edwin Torbjörnsson	88.95	ISK 166,000	ISK 60,000	ISK 30,000	(Iceland) Bullseye, Reykjavík
2026	Jani Laurila	77.33	6 – 4	Dennis Nilsson	78.73	NOK 22,560	NOK 8,000	NOK 3,600	(Norway) Hotel 33, Oslo

=== Women's ===
Year	Champion	Av.	Score	Runner-Up	Av.	Prize Money			Venue
Year	Champion	Av.	Score	Runner-Up	Av.	Total	Ch.	R.-Up	Venue
1981	(Sweden) Madelaine Sandberg	n/a	beat	(Sweden) Maud Westerlund	n/a	n/a	n/a	n/a	(Finland) Espoo
1982	(Sweden) Carina Sahlberg	n/a	beat	(Sweden)	n/a	n/a	n/a	n/a	(Sweden) Södertälje
1983	(Finland) Sirpa Levanen	n/a	beat	(Norway)	n/a	n/a	n/a	n/a	(Norway) Klubben Hotel, Tønsberg
1984	(Finland) Merike Savolainen	n/a	beat	(Denmark) Annette Rasmussen	n/a	n/a	n/a	n/a	(Denmark) Aarhus
1985	(Finland) Lotta Eriksson	n/a	beat	(Sweden) Marjatta Maattanen	n/a	n/a	n/a	n/a	(Finland) Turku
1986	(Finland) Eila Nikander	n/a	beat	(Sweden) Carina Sahlberg	n/a	n/a	n/a	n/a	(Sweden) Södertälje
1987	(Sweden) Maarit Fagerholm	n/a	beat	(Sweden) Helena Ohlssen	n/a	n/a	n/a	n/a	(Norway) Sandefjord
1988	(Finland) Eila Nikander (2)	n/a	beat	(Sweden) Maarit Fagerholm	n/a	n/a	n/a	n/a	(Denmark) Copenhagen
1989	(Norway) Heidi Berdal	n/a	beat	(Sweden) Hannele Varis	n/a	n/a	n/a	n/a	(Finland) Helsinki
1990	(Finland) Paivi Jussila	n/a	beat	(Denmark) Lene Mikkelsen	n/a	n/a	n/a	n/a	(Sweden) Upplands-Väsby
1991	(Denmark) Gerda Weltz	n/a	beat	(Denmark)	n/a	n/a	n/a	n/a	(Norway) Hamar
1992	(Denmark) Gerda Weltz (2)	n/a	beat	(Denmark) Ann-Louise Peters	n/a	n/a	n/a	n/a	(Denmark) Lyngby
1994	(Sweden) Viviann Petterson	n/a	beat	(Norway) Tove Vestrum	n/a	n/a	n/a	n/a	(Sweden) Borlänge
1995	(Norway) Karin Nordahl	n/a	beat	(Denmark) Annette Hakonsen	n/a	n/a	n/a	n/a	(Iceland) Reykjanesbaer, Keflavík
1996	(Finland) Sirpa Levanen	n/a	beat	(Finland) Tarja Salminen	n/a	n/a	n/a	n/a	(Norway) Plaza Hotel, Oslo
1998	(Sweden) Kristina Korpii	n/a	beat	(Denmark) Ann-Louise Peters	n/a	n/a	n/a	n/a	(Denmark) Billund
2002	(Sweden) Kristina Korpii (2)	n/a	beat	(Denmark) Annette Hakonsen	n/a	n/a	n/a	n/a	(Sweden) Lund
2004	(Norway) Hege Løkken	n/a	beat	(Denmark) Mona Lund	n/a	n/a	n/a	n/a	(Iceland) Hverdagerdi
2006	(Finland) Tarja Salminen	n/a	beat	(Norway) Rachna David	n/a	n/a	n/a	n/a	(Norway) Klubben Hotel, Tønsberg
2008	(Sweden) Gretel Glasö	n/a	beat	(Finland) Maret Liiri	n/a	n/a	n/a	n/a	(Finland) Tallukka Hotel, Vaaksy
2010	(Finland) Tarja Salminen (2)	n/a	beat	(Finland) Kirsi Viinikainen	n/a	n/a	n/a	n/a	(Denmark) Vejle
2012	(Finland) Lumi Silvan	n/a	beat	(Sweden) Maud Jansson	n/a	n/a	n/a	n/a	(Sweden) Scandic Alvik, Stockholm
2014	(Finland) Kaisu Rekinen	n/a	beat	(Sweden) Anna Forsmark	n/a	n/a	n/a	n/a	(Iceland) Natura Hotel Icelandair, Reykjavík
2016	(Finland) Lumi Silvan (2)	n/a	beat	(Sweden) Paulina Soderstrom	n/a	n/a	n/a	n/a	(Norway) Sundvolden Hotel, Krokkleiva
2018	(Sweden) Maud Jansson	64.65	4 – 0	(Sweden) Susianne Hagvall	54.87	n/a	n/a	n/a	(Finland) Clarion Hotel, Helsinki
2022	Veronica Simonsen	58.94	4 – 0	Anna Forsmark	55.39	SEK 5,000	SEK 2,000	SEK 1,000	(Sweden) Scandic Triangeln, Malmö
2024	Michelle Merlit	64.39	6 – 5	(Sweden) Maud Jansson	56.42	ISK 166,000	ISK 60,000	ISK 30,000	(Iceland) Bullseye, Reykjavík
2026	Rachna David	61.93	6 – 5	Snežana Veljković	63.31	NOK 22,560	NOK 8,000	NOK 3,600	(Norway) Hotel 33, Oslo
