= 1982 WDF Europe Cup =

Tournament information
- Venue: Cliffs Pavilion
- Location: Westcliff-on-Sea, Southend
- Country: England
- Established: 15–16 October
- Organisation(s): WDF
- Format: Legs

Champion(s)
- Singles; Bobby George (men's singles); Sandra Gibb-Lee (women's singles); Pairs (Sweden) Stefan Lord & Bjørn Enqvist (men's pairs) (Sweden) Charlotte Eriksson & Carina Sahlberg (women's pairs); Team; England (men's team); Overall; England (men's overall); Wales (women's overall)

The 1982 WDF Europe Cup was the 3rd edition of the WDF Europe Cup darts tournament, organised by the World Darts Federation. It was held at the Cliffs Pavilion in Westcliff-on-Sea, Southend, England from October 15 to 16.

== Entered Teams ==
20 countries/associations entered a men's selection in the event.

11 countries/associations entered a women's selection in the event.

Nr.	Country	Men's Selection
1	Belgium	Willy Delaere, Louis van Iseghem, Dirk van der Eycken, Luc Marreel
2	Cyprus	Willie Hanley, Agatholis Pericleous, Andreas Theodorou, Evangelos Sofocleous
3	Denmark	Finn Jensen, Kim Jensen, Jan Larsen, Per-Steen Byrgesen
4	England	Dave Whitcombe, Cliff Lazarenko, Bobby George, Eric Bristow
5	Gibraltar	Freddie Duarte, John Neale, Duncan Stewart, Leslie Ward
6	Finland	Martti Lihavainen, Taisto Piiroinen, Kexi Heinäharju, Kari Saukkonen
7	France	Phillippe Labernardiere, Jean-Claude Fichot, Lucien Lesaout, Patrick Cochepin
8	Guernsey	Barrie Allen, Terry Duquemin, Michael Gamblin, Peter Quertier
9	Ireland	Donnie Corbett, Seamus O'Brien, John Joe O'Shea, John Buckley
10	Jersey	Tony Abbott, Joseph Bell, William Shanks, Michael Wickenden
11	Malta	Alexander Bonnici, Domnic Cachia, Tony Darmanin, Lorry Galea
12	Netherlands	Ellis Elsevijf, Gerard van Dissel, Ruud Kleyweg, Malcolm Nolan
13	Northern Ireland	Steve Brennan, Roy Baillie, Fred McMullan, David Keery
14	Norway	Kjell Jorgensen, Bjorn Torgersen, Rolf Kvasheim, Svein-Arne Hjelmeland
15	Scotland	Peter Masson, Angus Ross, Jocky Wilson, Jim McGuigan
16	Sweden	Peter Hamberg, Christer Pilblad, Stefan Lord, Bjørn Enqvist
17	Switzerland	Klaus Bucher, Jean Cerat, Felix Degen, Tobias Gabor
18	Spain	Juan-Coll Martinez, Tony Martin-Diaz, Pedro Siques-Serda, Steve Watson
19	Wales	Dyfri Jones, Tony Ridler, Ceri Morgan, Peter Locke
20	West Germany	Bernd Hebecker, Wolfgang Damm, Jack Naugle, Colin Rice

Nr.	Country	Woman's Selection
1	Belgium	Jeanne Carton & Vicky Blieck
2	Denmark	Annette Rasmussen & Kirsten Trans
3	England	Linda Batten & Maureen Flowers
4	Finland	Sirpa Levanen & Paivi Lonnroth-Heinäharju
5	Ireland	Pat McKenna & Josephine Ussher
6	Netherlands	Sylvia Gouthier & Valerie Maytum
7	Northern Ireland	Kathleen Lynch & Mary McShane
8	Norway	Bente Knudsen & Elin Timenes
9	Scotland	Lynn MacKay & Cathie Gibson-McCulloch
10	Sweden	Charlotte Eriksson & Carina Sahlberg
11	Wales	Sandra Gibb-Lee & Ann-Marie Davies

== Men's singles ==
Players in bold denote match winners.

**1st Round** (best of 7 legs)
(England) **Eric Bristow**
Bye
(Netherlands) **Gerard van Dissel**	**4**
(Finland) Kari Saukkonen	2
(Northern Ireland) **Steve Brennan**
Bye
(Wales) **Ceri Morgan**	**4**
(France) Lucien Lesaout	0
(Scotland) **Jocky Wilson**
Bye
(Norway) **Svein-Arne Hjelmeland**	**4**
(Belgium) Luc Marreel	2
(Sweden) **Stefan Lord**	**4**
(Republic of Ireland) Donnie Corbett	1
(Denmark) **Finn Jensen**
Bye
(England) **Dave Whitcombe**	**4**
(Norway) Rolf Kvasheim	0
(Belgium) **Willy Delaere**
Bye
(Sweden) **Bjørn Enqvist**	**4**
(Northern Ireland) Fred McMullan	1
(Wales) **Dyfri Jones**
Bye
(Scotland) **Angus Ross**	**4**
(Denmark) Per-Steen Byrgesen	3
(Netherlands) **Ruud Kleyweg**
Bye
(Finland) **Kexi Heinäharju**	**4**
(Republic of Ireland) John Buckley	3
(France) **Jean-Claude Fichot**
Bye
(Denmark) **Kim Jensen**	**4**
(Wales) Peter Locke	3
(Northern Ireland) **David Keery**
Bye
(Republic of Ireland) **Seamus O'Brien**	**4**
(France) Phillippe Labernardiere	0
(Finland) **Taisto Piiroinen**
Bye
(England) **Bobby George**	**4**
(Belgium) Dirk van der Eycken	0
(Sweden) **Christer Pilblad**
Bye
(Scotland) **Peter Masson**	**4**
(Netherlands) Malcolm Nolan	1
(Norway) **Kjell Jorgensen**
Bye
(England) **Cliff Lazarenko**
Bye
(Netherlands) **Ellis Elsevijf**	**4**
(Sweden) Peter Hamberg	3
(Republic of Ireland) **John Joe O'Shea**
Bye
(Belgium) **Louis van Iseghem**	**4**
(Denmark) Jan Larsen	3
(Scotland) **Jim McGuigan**
Bye
(France) **Patrick Cochepin**	**4**
(Norway) Bjorn Torgersen	0
(Finland) **Martti Lihavainen**
Bye
(Wales) **Tony Ridler**	**4**
(Northern Ireland) Roy Baillie	0

**2nd Round** (best of 7 legs)
(England) **Eric Bristow**	**4**
(Netherlands) Gerard van Dissel	0
(Northern Ireland) **Steve Brennan**	**4**
(Wales) Ceri Morgan	0
(Scotland) **Jocky Wilson**	**4**
(Norway) Svein-Arne Hjelmeland	2
(Sweden) **Stefan Lord**	**4**
(Denmark) Finn Jensen	1
(England) **Dave Whitcombe**	**4**
(Belgium) Willy Delaere	2
(Sweden) **Bjørn Enqvist**	**4**
(Wales) Dyfri Jones	3
(Scotland) **Angus Ross**	**4**
(Netherlands) Ruud Kleyweg	0
(Finland) **Kexi Heinäharju**	**4**
(France) Jean-Claude Fichot	1
(Denmark) **Kim Jensen**	**4**
(Northern Ireland) David Keery	2
(Republic of Ireland) **Seamus O'Brien**	**4**
(Finland) Taisto Piiroinen	3
(England) **Bobby George**	**4**
(Sweden) Christer Pilblad	1
(Scotland) **Peter Masson**	**4**
(Norway) Kjell Jorgensen	0
(England) **Cliff Lazarenko**	**4**
(Netherlands) Ellis Elsevijf	3
(Republic of Ireland) **John Joe O'Shea**	**4**
(Belgium) Louis van Iseghem	0
(Scotland) **Jim McGuigan**	**4**
(France) Patrick Cochepin	0
(Finland) **Martti Lihavainen**	**4**
(Wales) Tony Ridler	3

**3rd Round** (best of 7 legs)
(England) **Eric Bristow**	**4**
(Northern Ireland) Steve Brennan	3
(Scotland) **Jocky Wilson**	**4**
(Sweden) Stefan Lord	3
(England) **Dave Whitcombe**	**4**
(Sweden) Bjørn Enqvist	2
(Scotland) **Angus Ross**	**4**
(Finland) Kexi Heinäharju	2
(Denmark) **Kim Jensen**	**4**
(Republic of Ireland) Seamus O'Brien	1
(England) **Bobby George**	**4**
(Scotland) Peter Masson	2
(England) **Cliff Lazarenko**	**4**
(Republic of Ireland) John Joe O'Shea	3
(Scotland) **Jim McGuigan**	**4**
(Finland) Martti Lihavainen	2

**Quarter-finals** (best of 7 legs)
(England) **Eric Bristow**	**4**
(Scotland) Jocky Wilson	0
(England) **Dave Whitcombe**	**4**
(Scotland) Angus Ross	2
(England) **Bobby George**	**4**
(Denmark) Kim Jensen	2
(England) **Cliff Lazarenko**	**4**
(Scotland) Jim McGuigan	1

**Semi-finals** (best of 7 legs)
(England) **Eric Bristow**	**4**
(England) Dave Whitcombe	3
(England) **Bobby George**	**4**
(England) Cliff Lazarenko	1

**Final** (best of 7 legs)
(England) Eric Bristow	1
(England) **Bobby George**	**4**
