= German Gold Cup =

Tournament information
- Location: Bremen
- Country: Germany
- Established: 1985
- Organisation(s): DDV / WDF category 3
- Prize fund: €4,700
- Final Year: 2015

Current champion(s)
- (Germany) Kevin Münch

The German Gold Cup was a darts tournament that has been held annually since 1985.

== List of winners ==
Year	Champion	Score	Runner-up	Total Prize Money	Champion	Runner-up
1984	(West Germany) Manfred Hegmann	?–?	(West Germany) Rolf Kahrau	?	?	?
1985	(West Germany) Bernd Hebecker	?-?	(West Germany) Colin Rice	?	?	?
1986	(West Germany) Colin Rice	?-?	(West Germany) Dieter Sentrup	?	?	?
1987	(West Germany) Holger Hentrup	?-?	(West Germany) Marko Voiges	?	?	?
1988	(West Germany) Bernd Hebecker	?-?	(West Germany) Steve Lewis	?	?	?
1989	(Belgium) Marc De Vuyst	?-?	(Belgium) Frans Devooght	?	?	?
1990	(Belgium) Leo Laurens	?-?	(Germany) Christian Groner	?	?	?
1991	(Denmark) Jann Hoffmann	?-?	(Germany) Colin Rice	?	?	?
1992	(Belgium) Frans Devooght	?-?	(Germany) Andreas Krockel	?	?	?
1993	(Germany) Andreas Krockel	?-?	(Germany) Colin Rice	?	?	?
1994	(Germany) Markus Schulte	?-?	(Germany) Uwe Bohmert	?	?	?
1995	(Germany) Jurgen Nau	?-?	(Germany) Andree Welge	?	?	?
1996	(Germany) Andreas Schendel	?-?	(Germany) Wolfgang Sperl	?	?	?
1997	(Germany) Patrick Klein	?-?	(Germany) Clarenze Sauzier	?	?	?
1998	(Germany) Colin Rice	?-?	(Germany) Bernd Hebecker	?	?	?
1999	(Germany) Andree Welge	?–?	(Germany) Thomas Wille	?	?	?
2000	(England) Martin Adams	?–?	(Germany) Thomas Wille	?	?	?
2001	(England) Martin Adams	?–?	(Germany) Thomas Wille	?	?	?
2002	(England) Martin Adams	?–?	(Germany) Rudiger Preuss	?	?	?
2003	(Austria) Mensur Suljović	?–?	(Germany) Jyhan Artut	?	?	?
2004	(Netherlands) Vincent van der Voort	?–?	(Belgium) Erik Clarys	?	?	?
2005	(Germany) Tomas Seyler	?–?	(Czech Republic) David Miklas	?	?	?
2006	(Belgium) Erik Clarys	?–?	(Netherlands) Johnny Nijs	?	?	?
2007	(England) Tony Eccles	3–1	(Netherlands) Remco van Eijden	€2,210	€700	€350
2008	(England) Steve West	3–2	(Germany) Andree Welge	€3,420	€840	€420
2009	(Germany) Kevin Münch	3–1	(Netherlands) Jan Dekker	€3,420	€840	€420
2010	(Denmark) Vladimir Andersen	3–1	(Germany) Tobias Muller	€3,120	€800	€400
2011	(Germany) Thomas Junghans	3–0	(Germany) Swen Seifert	€2,850	€700	€350
2012	(Germany) Tomas Seyler	3–1	(Belgium) Geert De Vos	€2,850	€700	€350
2013	(Netherlands) Rick Hofstra	3–0	(Germany) Tomas Seyler	€2,850	€700	€350
2014	(Netherlands) Jermaine Wattimena	3–2	(Netherlands) Jan Dekker	€3,120	€800	€400
2015	(Germany) Kevin Münch	3–2	(Germany) Daniel Zygla	€3,120	€800	€400
