= 1990 BDO World Darts Championship =

Tournament information
- Dates: 5–13 January 1990
- Venue: Lakeside Country Club
- Location: Frimley Green, Surrey
- Country: England
- Organisation(s): BDO
- Format: Sets; Final – best of 11
- Prize fund: £153,200
- Winner's share: £24,000
- Nine-dart finish: (United States) Paul Lim (£52,000)
- High checkout: 170 (England) Peter Evison (England) Phil Taylor

Champion(s)
- (England) Phil Taylor

The 1990 BDO World Darts Championship (known for sponsorship reasons as the 1990 Embassy World Darts Championship) was held at the Lakeside Country Club in Frimley Green, Surrey from 5–13 January 1990. It saw then-unknown Phil Taylor win the first of sixteen world titles, beating his mentor Eric Bristow 6–1 in sets in the final, with Taylor playing in his first ever World Championship at the age of 29. Taylor beat Russell Stewart, Dennis Hickling, Ronnie Sharp and Cliff Lazarenko en route to the final. Defending champion Jocky Wilson fell at the quarter-final stage, losing to Mike Gregory.

The event also saw America's Paul Lim hit the first nine-dart finish at the World Championship in his second round match with Ireland's Jack McKenna, receiving £52,000 for his efforts. It was the only nine-dart finish ever thrown in the BDO World Championship.

== Seeds ==
1. (England) Eric Bristow
2. (England) Bob Anderson
3. (England) John Lowe
4. (England) Mike Gregory
5. (Scotland) Jocky Wilson
6. (Australia) Russell Stewart
7. (England) Peter Evison
8. (Wales) Brian Cairns

== Prize money ==
The prize fund was £100,000.

Champion: £24,000
Runner-Up: £12,000
Semi-Finalists (2): £6,000
Quarter-Finalists (4): £3,000
Last 16 (8): £2,200
Last 32 (16): £1,400

There was also a 9 Dart Checkout prize of £52,000, along with a High Checkout prize of £1,000.

== The Results ==
First Round (best of 5 sets)
1	(England) Eric Bristow (91.71)	3
(Wales) Leighton Rees (86.13)	0
(England) Steve Gittins (87.60)	3
(Australia) Wayne Weening (80.61)	0
8	(Wales) Brian Cairns (86.28)	3
(Scotland) Mike Veitch (76.11)	0
(Sweden) Magnus Caris (93.00)	3
(Finland) Antero Rantala (70.41)	0
5	(Scotland) Jocky Wilson (81.81)	3
(Northern Ireland) Mitchell Crooks (81.90)	1
(England) Chris Whiting (85.26)	3
(England) Dave Whitcombe (84.84)	2
4	(England) Mike Gregory (89.46)	3
(England) Alan Warriner (87.81)	0
(Belgium) Leo Laurens (87.93)	3
(Canada) Bob Sinnaeve (86.94)	2
2	(England) Bob Anderson (86.35)	2
(Denmark) Jann Hoffmann (86.09)	3
(England) Cliff Lazarenko (73.86)	3
(Netherlands) Bert Vlaardingerbroek (73.26)	2
7	(England) Peter Evison (78.06)	1
(Republic of Ireland) Jack McKenna (79.62)	3
(United States) Paul Lim (83.55)	3
(England) Ray Battye (80.19)	2
6	(Australia) Russell Stewart (86.31)	1
(England) Phil Taylor (88.62)	3
(England) Dennis Hickling (76.29)	3
(United States) Tony Payne (74.34)	1
3	(England) John Lowe (84.72)	3
(Canada) Albert Anstey (83.19)	1
(Scotland) Ronnie Sharp (77.46)	3
(Denmark) Kim Jensen (72.21)	2

Second Round (best of 5 sets)
1	(England) Eric Bristow (87.87)	3
(England) Steve Gittins (85.47)	2
8	(Wales) Brian Cairns (80.25)	0
(Sweden) Magnus Caris (82.32)	3
5	(Scotland) Jocky Wilson (89.46)	3
(England) Chris Whiting (88.38)	2
4	(England) Mike Gregory (89.40)	3
(Belgium) Leo Laurens (84.87)	1
(Denmark) Jann Hoffmann (79.98)	0
(England) Cliff Lazarenko (90.42)	3
(Republic of Ireland) Jack McKenna (78.66)	2
(United States) Paul Lim (80.97)	3
(England) Phil Taylor (86.67)	3
(England) Dennis Hickling (73.53)	0
3	(England) John Lowe (89.13)	2
(Scotland) Ronnie Sharp (94.11)	3

Quarter-Finals (best of 7 sets)
1	(England) Eric Bristow (95.25)	4
(Sweden) Magnus Caris (89.67)	1
5	(Scotland) Jocky Wilson (89.19)	3
4	(England) Mike Gregory (90.63)	4
(England) Cliff Lazarenko (81.75)	4
(United States) Paul Lim (77.73)	0
(England) Phil Taylor (94.23)	4
(Scotland) Ronnie Sharp (86.79)	2

Semi-Finals (best of 9 sets)
1	(England) Eric Bristow (88.38)	5
4	(England) Mike Gregory (90.27)	2
(England) Cliff Lazarenko (85.41)	0
(England) Phil Taylor (100.80)	5

Final (best of 11 sets)
1	(England) Eric Bristow (93.02)	1
(England) Phil Taylor (97.47)	6
