= Nordic Invitational =

The Nordic Cup is a darts tournament that has been held since 1975. It is the Nordic Championships, and the winners are Nordic Champions.

It is an invitational, the participating countries are: Norway, Finland, Sweden, Denmark and Iceland. Teams consist of 8 men (2 teams of 4 players, A and B teams) & 4 woman players (1 team).

Matches are played as Men's Team Event, Men's Pairs & Men's Singles - Ladies Team event, Ladies Pairs & Ladies Singles. Points are awarded to each nation depending on individual and team performances, with overall gold going to the nation with most points.

From 1976 till 1996 it was played every year. From 1996 and till today it is only played every second year

== Men ==
=== Men's Singles ===
Year	Champion	Runner-up
1974	(England) Mick Norris	(Australia) Hugh Barnsley
1975	(Wales) Leighton Rees	(Wales) Alan Evans
1976	(United States) Conrad Daniels	(United States) Javier Gopar
1977	(England) John Lowe	(England) Tony Brown
1978	(Australia) Barry Atkinson	(Australia) Tim Brown
1979	(Scotland) Rab Smith	(Canada) Allan Hogg
1980	(Denmark) Jan Larsen	(Sweden) Lars Carlèn
1981	(Finland) Kexi Heinäharju	(Sweden) Stefan Lord
1982	(Sweden) Stefan Lord	(Finland) Kexi Heinäharju
1983	(Finland) Tapani Uitos	(Finland) Kexi Heinäharju
1984	(Denmark) Jørgen Rasmussen	(Denmark) Kim Jensen
1985	(Sweden) Stefan Lord	(Sweden) Christer Pilblad
1986	(Finland) Kexi Heinaharju	(Norway) Svend A. Hjelmeland
1987	(United States) Tony Payne	(England) Eric Bristow
1988	(Australia) Russell Stewart	(Sweden) Stefan Lord
1989	(Denmark) Troels Rusel	(Sweden) Mads Hildingsson
1990	(Denmark) Per Skau	(Sweden) Lars Erik Karlsson
1991	(Denmark) Jann Hoffmann	(Denmark) Per Skau
1992	(Denmark) Per Skau	(Sweden) Magnus Caris
1993	(Denmark) Per Skau	(Sweden) Magnus Caris
1994	(Finland) Risto Sundgren	(Sweden) Göran Klemme
1995	(Finland) Marko Englund	(Norway) Thor H.Johansen
1996	(Sweden) Stefan Nagy	(Sweden) Ronny Röhr
1998	(Denmark) Bjarne Iversen	(Norway) Vidar Samuelsen
2000	(Finland) Marko Pusa	(Finland) Jarkko Komula
2002	(Sweden) Jonas Olofsson	(Finland) Kim Viljanen
2004	(Finland) Marko Kantele	(Denmark) Brian Sørensen
2006	(Finland) Marko Kantele	(Finland) Jarkko Komula
2008	(Finland) Jarkko Komula	(Sweden) Markus Korhonen
2010	(Finland) Petri Korte	(Sweden) Magnus Caris
2012	(Sweden) Johan Engstrøm	(Sweden) Daniel Larsson
2014	(Sweden) Daniel Larsson	(Finland) Marko Kantele
2016	(Sweden) Andreas Harrysson	(Sweden) Daniel Larsson
2018	(Sweden) Andreas Harrysson	(Finland) Petri Rasmus

=== Men's Pairs ===
Year	Champion	Runner-up
1974	(England) Mick Norris / Cliff Inglis	(South Africa) Alid Esterhuizen / Jan Blignaut
1975	(Wales) Phil Obbard / Ray Phillips	(United States) Conrad Daniels / Nicky Virachkul
1976	(England) John Lowe / Tony Brown	(England) Eric Bristow / Cliff Lazarenko
1977	(Australia) George Foster / Kevin White	(Australia) Barry Atkinson / Tim Brown
1978	(Scotland) Jocky Wilson / Rab Smith	(Republic of Ireland) Jim McQuillan / Jack McKenna
1979	(Canada) Allan Hogg / Bob Sinnaeve	(Wales) Leighton Rees / Tony Clark
1980	(Denmark) Jan Larsen / Kaj Mortensen	(Denmark) Orla Iversen /Børge Madsen
1981	(Sweden) Bjørn Engqvist / Stefan Lord	(Sweden) Mille Eriksson / Pelle Hamberg
1982	(Sweden) Bjørn Engqvist / Stefan Lord	(Sweden) Mille Eriksson / Pelle Hamberg
1983	(Finland) Seppo Saarinen / Tomi Palmu	(Sweden) Christer Pilblad / Kjell Kulan
1984	(Finland) Taisto Piiroinen / Arto Lintunen	(Finland) Harri Heino / Hans Rönnquist
1985	(Finland) Harri Heino /Reijo Kononen	(Finland) Tapani Uitos / Arto Lintunen
1986	(Sweden) Leif Hornström / Gert Nordling	(Sweden) Stefan Lord / Christer Pilblad
1987	(Sweden) Stefan Lord / Magnus Caris	(England) Mike Gregory / Dave Whitcombe
1988	(Australia) Frank Palko / Russell Stewart	(United States) Tony Payne / Gerald Verrier
1989	(Finland) Nissinen / Kexi Heinähärju	(Sweden) Magnus Caris / Andre Bomander
1990	(Denmark) Per Skau / Kim G. Jensen	(Denmark) Søren Byø / Henning von Essen
1991	(Denmark) Per Skau / Jan Guldsten	(Norway) Knud Nilsen / Arild Folgerø
1992	(Sweden) Magnus Caris / Stefan Nagy	(Denmark) Jann Hoffmann / Per Eklund
1993	(Iceland) Friðrik Jakobsson / Guðjón Hauksson	(Denmark) Mogens Ranum / Kim G. Jensen
1994	(Denmark) Torben Christensen / Stig Jørgensen	(Norway) Øyvind Aasland / Arild Folgerø
1995	(Sweden) Matti Rågegård / Ronny Röhr	(Finland) Heikki Hermunen / Ari Ilmanen
1996	(Denmark) Frede Johansen / Stig Jørgensen	(Sweden) Stefan Nagy / Peter Brolin
1998	(Finland) Marko Pusa / Keijo Survonen	(Denmark) Bjarne Jensen / Frede Johansen
2000	(Finland) Marko Pusa / Jarkko Komula	(Finland) Marko Kantele / Mikko Laiho
2002	(Finland) Ulf Ceder / Kim Viljanen	(Denmark) Frede Johansen / Brian Sørensen
2004	(Sweden) Ronny Röhr / Daniel Larsson	(Denmark) Per Laursen / Dennis Lindskjold
2006	(Sweden) Göran Klemme / Markus Korhonen	(Sweden) Daniel Larsson / Kenneth Högwall
2008	(Finland) Marko Kantele / Jarkko Komula	(Sweden) Tommy Pilblad / Oscar Lukasiak
2010	(Finland) Petri Korte / Asko Niskala	(Finland) Sami Sanssi / Vesa Nuutinen
2012	(Denmark) Frede Johansen / Vladimir Andersen	(Sweden) Johan Engström / Daniel Larsson
2014	(Finland) Kim Viljanen / Marko Kantele	(Denmark) Vladimir Andersen / Mogens Christensen
2016	(Denmark) Per Laursen / Mogens Christensen	(Norway) Robert Wagner / Vegar Elvevoll
2018	(Sweden) Andreas Harrysson / Oskar Lukasiak	(Sweden) Ricky Nauman / Mauri Tuutijärvi

=== Men's Team ===
Year	Champion	Runner-up
1980	Denmark A	Sweden A
1981	Sweden A	Denmark A
1982	Sweden B	Sweden A
1983	Sweden B	Finland B
1984	Sweden A	Finland B
1985	Sweden A	Finland A
1986	Finland A	Norway A
1987	Sweden A	Finland A
1988	Sweden A	Finland A
1989	Sweden B	Norway B
1990	Sweden A	(Sweden) Denmark A
1991	Denmark A	Norway A
1992	Sweden A	Denmark A
1993	Denmark A	Norway A
1994	Norway A	Finland A
1995	Finland B	Finland A
1996	Denmark A	Norway A
1998	Denmark A	Denmark B
2000	Finland A	Denmark A
2002	Finland A	Denmark A
2004	Denmark A	Finland A
2006	Finland A	Finland B
2008	Denmark A	Finland A
2010	Denmark A	Norway A
2012	Finland B	Finland A
2014	Denmark B	Finland B
2016	Sweden B	Sweden A

=== Men's Overall ===
Year	Champion	Runner-up	3rd place
1980	Denmark	Sweden	Finland
1981	Sweden	Finland	Denmark
1982	Finland	Sweden	Denmark
1983	Finland	Sweden	Denmark
1984	Sweden	Finland	Norway
1985	Sweden	Finland	Norway
1986	Sweden	Finland	Norway
1987	No results	No results	No results
1988	No results	No results	No results
1989	Sweden	Denmark	Finland
1990	Denmark	Sweden	Finland
1991	Denmark	Norway	Sweden
1992	Sweden	Denmark	Norway
1993	Sweden	Denmark	Norway
1994	Norway	Finland	Denmark
1995	Finland	Sweden	Norway
1996	Denmark	Sweden	Finland
1998	Denmark	Norway	Finland
2000	Finland	Denmark	Sweden
2002	Finland	Denmark	Sweden
2004	Denmark	Finland	Sweden
2006	Finland	Sweden	Denmark
2008	Finland	Sweden	Denmark
2010	Finland	Norway	Denmark
2012	Sweden	Finland	Norway
2014	Finland	Denmark	Sweden
2016	Sweden	Norway	Denmark

== Ladies ==
=== Ladies Single ===
Year	Champion	Runner-up
1980	(Sweden) Madelaine Sandberg	(Sweden) Gui Deimark
1981	(Finland) Eila Nikander	(Sweden) Anki Ekman
1982	(Finland) Päivi Lönnroth	(Sweden) Carina Sahlberg
1983	(Sweden) Carina Sahlberg	(Sweden) Marta Leeb Lundberg
1984	(Finland) Sirpa Levänen	(Sweden) Carina Sahlberg
1985	(Sweden) Carina Sahlberg	(Finland) Eila Nikander
1986	(Sweden) Carina Sahlberg	(Finland) Eila Nikander
1987	Not played	Not played
1988	Not played	Not played
1989	(Sweden) Carina Sahlberg	(Sweden) Hannele Varis
1990	(Sweden) Yvonne Hylten	(Finland) Päivi Blomster
1991	(Sweden) Anette Ferm	(Norway) Karin Nordahl
1992	(Finland) Paivi Jussila	(Norway) Hege Løkken
1993	(Norway) Hege Løkken	(Finland) Åsa Törmä
1994	(Finland) Päivi Jussila	(Finland) Tarja Salminen
1995	(Norway) Hege Løkken	(Norway) Karin Nordahl
1996	(Norway) Karin Nordahl	(Finland) Riitta Eskelinen
1998	(Denmark) Annette Hakonsen	(Denmark) Ann-Louise Peters
2000	(Finland) Tarja Salminen	(Finland) Satu Ikonen
2002	(Sweden) Kristiina Korpi	(Sweden) Carina Ekberg
2004	(Norway) Hege Løkken	(Denmark) Mona Lund
2006	(Norway) Mette Hansen	(Denmark) Mette Funch
2008	(Sweden) Pernilla Brodin	(Finland) Tarja Salminen
2010	(Sweden) Anna Forsmark	(Finland) Kirsi Viinikainen
2012	(Norway) Rachna David	(Denmark) Janni Larsen
2014	(Sweden) Linda Nilsson	(Denmark) Janni Larsen
2016	(Denmark) Berit Schouw	(Norway) Rachna David

=== Ladies Pairs ===
Year	Champion	Runner-up
1980	(Sweden) Madeleine Sandberg / S.Sandberg	(Sweden) Gunilla Åhlen / Anki Ekman
1981	(Sweden) Mia Jansson / Carina Sahlberg	(Sweden) Madeleine Sandberg / Susanne Sandberg
1982	(Sweden) Carina Sahlberg / Madeleine Rosell	(Finland) Maria Dahlstrom / Marjatta Mattanen
1983	(Sweden) Marianne Wathèn / M.Leeb-Lundberg	(Finland) Maria Dahlstrom / Marjatta Mattanen
1984	(Sweden) Carina Sahlberg / Marianne Wathèn	(Finland) Laila Laaksonen / Tarja Tanskanen
1985	(Finland) Eila Nikander / Paivi Jussila	(Denmark) Bente Iversen / Inge Bujakewitz
1986	(Sweden) Maarit Fagerholm / Carina Sahlberg	(Norway) Åslaug Ekren / Gert Waage
1987	Not played	Not played
1988	Not played	Not played
1989	(Sweden) Cecilia Peterson / Hannele Varis	(Sweden) Carina Sahlberg / Annette Ferm
1990	(Norway) Hege Løkken / Arnhild Larsen	(Denmark) Annette Hakonsen / Gerda Weltz
1991	(Finland) Paivi Jussila / Eila Nikander	(Sweden) Helena Ohlsson / Annette Ferm
1992	(Finland) Paivi Jussila / Levänen	(Sweden) Annette Ferm / Helena Ohlsson
1993	(Finland) Paiva Jussila / Levänen	(Denmark) Ann-Louise Peters / Annette Hakonsen
1994	(Denmark) Gerda Weltz / Ann-Louise Peters	(Norway) Karin Nordahl / Tove Vestrum
1995	(Finland) Paivi Jussila / Eila Nikander	(Denmark) Anne-Louise Peters / Gerda Weltz
1996	(Denmark) Ann-Louise Peters / Annette Hakonsen	(Norway) Karin Nordahl / Lisbeth Hauen
1998	(Sweden) Kristiina Korpi / Linda Nilsson	(Norway) Tove Vestrum / M.Hansen
2000	(Norway) Tove Vestrum / Karin Nordahl	(Norway) Mette Hansen / Lise Gro Finnestad
2002	(Sweden) Kristiina Korpi / Carina Ekberg	(Denmark) Annette Hakonsen / Mona Lund
2004	(Finland) Tarja Salminen / S.Nikula	(Sweden) Carina Ekberg / Maud Jansson
2006	(Sweden) Maud Jansson / Pernilla Söderström	(Sweden) Grethel Glasö / Carina Ekberg
2008	(Norway) Mette Hansen / Hege Løkken	(Finland) M.Juhola / Lumi Silvan
2010	(Sweden) Anna Forsmark / Grethel Glasö	(Finland) Kirsi Viinikainen / Tarja Salminen
2012	(Finland) Lumi Silvan / Kirsi Viinikainen	(Norway) Rachna David / Tone Eriksen Wagner
2014	(Norway) Rachna David / Marta Krol	(Sweden) Anna Forsmark / Maud Jansson
2016	(Finland) Kaisu Rekinen / Sari Nikula	(Finland) Lumi Silvan / M. Juhola

=== Ladies Team ===
Year	Champion	Runner-up
1980	Sweden	Finland
1981	Finland	Finland
1982	Sweden	Sweden
1983	Finland	Unknown
1984	Sweden	Norway
1985	Denmark	Sweden
1986	(Norway) Norge	Finland A
1987	Sweden	Finland
1988	Finland A	Norway A
1989	Sweden	Finland
1990	Denmark	Sweden
1991	Finland	Sweden
1992	Sweden	Denmark
1993	Denmark	Finland
1994	Norway	Denmark
1995	Finland	Denmark
1996	Finland	Sweden
1998	Sweden	Norway
2000	Finland	Norway
2002	Sweden	Finland
2004	Finland	Norway
2006	Sweden	Finland
2008	Finland	Norway
2010	Finland	Sweden
2012	Finland	Sweden
2014	Norway	Finland
2016	Sweden	Norway

=== Ladies Overall ===
Year	Champion	Runner-up	3rd place
1980	Sweden	Finland	Denmark
1981	Finland	Sweden	Denmark
1982	Sweden	Denmark	Finland
1983	Sweden	Finland	Denmark
1984	Sweden	Finland	Norway
1985	Finland	Sweden	Denmark
1986	Sweden	Norway	Finland
1987	No results	No results	No results
1988	No results	No results	No results
1989	Sweden	Finland	Norway
1990	Denmark	Norway	Finland
1991	Sweden	Finland	Norway
1992	Sweden	Finland	Denmark
1993	Denmark	Finland	Sweden
1994	Denmark	Finland	Norway
1995	Finland	Norway	Denmark
1996	Finland	Norway	Denmark
1998	Sweden	Norway	Denmark
2000	Finland	Norway	Denmark
2002	Sweden	Finland	Denmark
2004	Finland	Norway	Sweden
2006	Sweden	Finland	Norway
2008	Finland	Norway	Sweden
2010	Sweden	Finland	Norway
2012	Finland	Sweden	Norway
2014	Norway	Finland	Sweden
2016	Norway	Finland	Denmark
