= German Open (darts) =

Tournament information
- Venue: Wunderland Kalkar
- Location: Kalkar
- Country: Germany
- Established: 1986
- Organisation(s): DSC Bochum
- Prize fund: €10,800
- Month(s) Played: April

Current champion(s)
- (Netherlands) Michael Busscher (men's) (Netherlands) Sharona Veld (women's)

The German Open (known for sponsorship reasons as the Bull's German Open) is a darts tournament that began in 1986. It was abandoned for three years before being recurred in 1990 where it has been held annually. All tournaments was held in Germany at various venues. The first winners of the tournament was Bernd Hebecker from Germany and Mia Mevissen from Netherlands.

Tournament was not organized in 2020–2022 due to coronavirus pandemic. It was announced that the tournament in 2023 will not be organized as part of the World Darts Federation and its results will not be included in the international and regional ranking of this organization. The event is organized by Dart Sport Club Bochum.

== List of tournaments ==
=== Men's ===
Year	Champion	Av.	Score	Runner-Up	Av.	Prize Money			Venue
Year	Champion	Av.	Score	Runner-Up	Av.	Total	Ch.	R.-Up	Venue
1986	(West Germany) Bernd Hebecker	n/a	beat	(Belgium) Franky Velle	n/a	—	—	—	Düsseldorf
1990	(Germany) Kai Pfeiffer	n/a	beat	(England) Harry Robinson	n/a	—	—	—	Bochum
1991	(Belgium) Bruno Raes	n/a	3 – 2	(United States) Steve Brown	n/a	—	—	—	Bochum
1992	(England) Peter Evison	n/a	3 – 0	(Belgium) Leo Laurens	n/a	—	—	—	Herne
1993	(England) Peter Evison (2)	n/a	3 – 1	(England) Rod Harrington	n/a	—	—	—	Herne
1994	(Denmark) Per Skau	94.68	2 – 0	(Wales) Sean Palfrey	93.90	—	—	—	Herne
1995	(England) Ronnie Baxter	n/a	3 – 2	(Scotland) Les Wallace	n/a	—	—	—	Herne
1996	(England) Colin Monk	n/a	3 – 2	(England) Andy Fordham	n/a	—	—	—	Herne
1997	(Belgium) Pascal Lefèvre	n/a	3 – 2	(Belgium) Erik Clarys	n/a	—	—	—	Herne
1998	(England) Alan Warriner	n/a	3 – 1	(England) Robbie Widdows	n/a	—	—	—	Herne
1999	(England) Steve Coote	93.27	3 – 1	(England) Gary Spedding	82.29	—	—	—	Herne
2000	(England) Shayne Burgess	97.38	3 – 2	(England) Dave Askew	86.61	—	—	—	Herne
2001	(England) Martin Adams	n/a	3 – 2	(England) Peter Manley	n/a	—	—	—	Herne
2002	(England) Ted Hankey	n/a	3 – 1	(England) Tony Eccles	n/a	—	—	—	Herne
2003	(England) Ted Hankey (2)	n/a	3 – 2	(Netherlands) André Brantjes	n/a	—	—	—	Herne
2004	(Scotland) Gary Anderson	n/a	3 – 0	(England) Tony O'Shea	n/a	€6,200	€2,000	€1,000	Herne
2005	(Scotland) Paul Hanvidge	n/a	3 – 2	(Netherlands) Arjan Moen	n/a	€5,400	€2,000	€1,000	Herne
2006	(Scotland) Gary Anderson (2)	n/a	3 – 2	(England) Martin Adams	n/a	€7,160	€2,000	€1,000	Städtische Sporthalle, Bochum
2007	(England) Martin Adams (2)	n/a	3 – 1	(England) John Walton	n/a	€6,200	€2,000	€1,000	Städtische Sporthalle, Bochum
2008	(Scotland) Gary Anderson (3)	n/a	3 – 0	(Scotland) Robert Thornton	n/a	€8,400	€2,400	€1,200	Städtische Sporthalle, Bochum
2009	(Scotland) John Henderson	n/a	3 – 2	(England) Stephen Bunting	n/a	€8,400	€2,400	€1,200	Städtische Sporthalle, Bochum
2010	(England) Dean Winstanley	n/a	3 – 2	(Belgium) Ronny Huybrechts	n/a	€8,400	€2,400	€1,200	Städtische Sporthalle, Bochum
2011	(Netherlands) Benito van de Pas	95.22	3 – 2	(England) Tony O'Shea	95.91	€8,000	€2,000	€1,200	Städtische Sporthalle, Bochum
2012	(Belgium) Geert De Vos	n/a	3 – 2	(England) Alan Norris	n/a	€6,000	€2,000	€1,000	Städtische Sporthalle, Bochum
2013	(Belgium) Geert De Vos (2)	n/a	3 – 1	(England) Stephen Bunting	n/a	€6,000	€2,000	€1,000	Städtische Sporthalle, Bochum
2014	(England) Darryl Fitton	n/a	3 – 1	(England) James Wilson	n/a	€6,000	€2,000	€1,000	Städtische Sporthalle, Bochum
2015	(Netherlands) Jeffrey de Graaf	n/a	8 – 7	(England) Martin Adams	n/a	€6,300	€3,000	€1,500	Städtische Sporthalle, Bochum
2016	(Netherlands) Danny Noppert	n/a	6 – 4	(Lithuania) Darius Labanauskas	n/a	€6,200	€2,000	€1,000	Städtische Sporthalle, Bochum
2017	(England) Mark McGeeney	89.47	6 – 2	(Netherlands) Toon Greebe	82.38	€8,400	€2,400	€1,200	Festplatz Castroper Straße, Bochum
2018	(England) Scott Mitchell	n/a	6 – 3	(Netherlands) Derk Telnekes	n/a	€8,400	€2,400	€1,200	Wunderland Kalkar, Kalkar
2019	(Belgium) Mario Vandenbogaerde	n/a	6 – 5	(Netherlands) Martijn Kleermaker	n/a	€8,400	€2,400	€1,200	Wunderland Kalkar, Kalkar
2023	Michael Busscher	n/a	beat	Dennie Olde Kalter	n/a	€7,700	€2,500	€1,000	Wunderland Kalkar, Kalkar

=== Women's ===
Year	Champion (average in final)	Score	Runner-up (average in final)	Total Prize Money	Champion	Runner-up
1986	(Netherlands) Mia Mevissen	bt.	(Netherlands) Anita Vink			
1990	(Netherlands) Valerie Maytum	bt.	(Germany) Marion Diehn			
1991	(Sweden) Vicky Pruim	bt.	(Germany) Claudia Seifert			
1992	(England) Sharon Colclough	bt.	(Germany) Heike Jenkins			
1993	(Finland) Päivi Jussila	bt.	(Germany) Heike Jenkins			
1994	(Netherlands) Valerie Maytum (2)	bt.	(England) Deta Hedman			
1995	(England) Sharon Colclough (2)	bt.	(Denmark) Gerda Weltz			
1996	(Netherlands) Francis Hoenselaar	bt.	(England) Deta Hedman			
1997	(England) Trina Gulliver	bt.	(England) Sharon Colclough			
1998	(England) Sharon Colclough (3)	bt.	(England) Trina Gulliver			
1999	(Netherlands) Francis Hoenselaar (2)	bt.	(England) Trina Gulliver			
2001	(Netherlands) Francis Hoenselaar (3)	bt.	(England) Tricia Wright			
2002	(Netherlands) Francis Hoenselaar (4)	2–1	(England) Trina Gulliver			
2003	(England) Trina Gulliver (2)	bt.	(Sweden) Carina Ekberg			
2004	(Netherlands) Francis Hoenselaar (5)	2–1	(England) Trina Gulliver			
2005	(England) Trina Gulliver (3)	2–0	(Finland) Marika Juhola			
2006	(Netherlands) Carla Molema	2–0	(Netherlands) Francis Hoenselaar			
2007	(Sweden) Carina Ekberg	2–1	(Netherlands) Carla Molema			
2008	(Wales) Julie Gore	2–0	(Netherlands) Rilana Erades			
2009	(England) Trina Gulliver (4)	2–1	(England) Tricia Wright			
2010	(England) Tricia Wright (2)	2–0	(Germany) Irina Armstrong			
2011	(England) Deta Hedman	2–0	(England) Lorraine Winstanley	€2,600	€1,000	€400
2012	(England) Deta Hedman (2)	2–0	(England) Lorraine Winstanley	€2,600	€1,000	€400
2013	(England) Deta Hedman (3)	2–1	(Netherlands) Sharon Prins	€2,600	€1,000	€400
2014	(Russia) Anastasia Dobromyslova	2–1	(England) Lorraine Winstanley	€2,600	€1,000	€400
2015	(England) Lorraine Winstanley	7–5	(England) Zoe Jones	€2,600	€1,000	€400
2016	(Netherlands) Aileen de Graaf	5–3	(Russia) Anastasia Dobromyslova	€2,600	€1,000	€400
2017	(England) Deta Hedman (4)	5–4	(Netherlands) Aileen de Graaf	€2,400	€800	€400
2018	(Netherlands) Aileen de Graaf (2)	5–1	(England) Deta Hedman	€2,400	€800	€400
2019	(Netherlands) Aileen de Graaf (3)	5–4	(England) Fallon Sherrock	€2,400	€800	€400
2023	Sharona Veld	beat	Petra Zimmer	€1,300	€500	€250

=== Boys ===
Year	Champion	Av.	Score	Runner-Up	Av.	Prize Money			Venue
Year	Champion	Av.	Score	Runner-Up	Av.	Total	Ch.	R.-Up	Venue
2012	(Netherlands) Jeffrey de Zwaan	n/a	beat	(Netherlands) Mike Zuydwijk	n/a	—	—	—	Städtische Sporthalle, Bochum
2013	(Netherlands) Jeffrey de Zwaan (2)	n/a	beat	(Netherlands) Colin Roelofs	n/a	—	—	—	Städtische Sporthalle, Bochum
2014	(Netherlands) Colin Roelofs	n/a	beat	(Netherlands) Justin van Tergouw	n/a	—	—	—	Städtische Sporthalle, Bochum
2015	(England) Callan Rydz	n/a	beat	(Netherlands) Wesley Hurrebrink	n/a	—	—	—	Städtische Sporthalle, Bochum
2016	(Netherlands) Justin van Tergouw	n/a	beat	(Austria) Rusty-Jake Rodriguez	n/a	—	—	—	Städtische Sporthalle, Bochum
2017	(Austria) Rusty-Jake Rodriguez	n/a	beat	(Germany) Nico Blum	n/a	—	—	—	Festplatz Castroper Straße, Bochum
2018	(Netherlands) Jurjen van der Velde	n/a	beat	(Netherlands) Danny de Graaf	n/a	—	—	—	Wunderland Kalkar, Kalkar
2019	(Netherlands) Owen Roelofs	n/a	beat	(Germany) Oliver Pieper	n/a	—	—	—	Wunderland Kalkar, Kalkar

=== Girls ===
Year	Champion	Av.	Score	Runner-Up	Av.	Prize Money			Venue
Year	Champion	Av.	Score	Runner-Up	Av.	Total	Ch.	R.-Up	Venue
2012	(Germany) Ann-Kathrin Wigmann	n/a	beat	(Germany) Anna Schultze	n/a	—	—	—	Städtische Sporthalle, Bochum
2013	(England) Casey Gallagher	n/a	beat	(Sweden) Sarah Rosen	n/a	—	—	—	Städtische Sporthalle, Bochum
2014	(Belgium) Shauni Wastyn	n/a	beat	(Netherlands) Kyana Frauenfelder	n/a	—	—	—	Städtische Sporthalle, Bochum
2015	(Denmark) Sofie-Jahn Bendorff	n/a	beat	(Netherlands) Kyana Frauenfelder	n/a	—	—	—	Städtische Sporthalle, Bochum
2016	(Germany) Christina Schuler	n/a	beat	(Netherlands) Kyana Frauenfelder	n/a	—	—	—	Städtische Sporthalle, Bochum
2017	(Germany) Christina Schuler (2)	n/a	beat	(Germany) Denise Schuler	n/a	—	—	—	Festplatz Castroper Straße, Bochum
2018	(Republic of Ireland) Katie Sheldon	n/a	beat	(Germany) Christina Schuler	n/a	—	—	—	Wunderland Kalkar, Kalkar
2019	(Netherlands) Lerena Rietbergen	n/a	beat	(Netherlands) Rosanne van der Velde	n/a	—	—	—	Wunderland Kalkar, Kalkar

== Tournament records ==
- Most wins 3: (Scotland) Gary Anderson
- Most Finals 4: (England) Martin Adams.
- Most Semi Finals 6: (England) Martin Adams.
- Most Quarter Finals 8: (England) Martin Adams.
- Most Appearances 13: (England) Martin Adams.
- Most Prize Money won €6289.85: (Scotland) Gary Anderson.
- Best winning average (96.60) : (Scotland) Gary Anderson v (Netherlands) Michael van Gerwen, SF, 2016.
- Youngest Winner age 18: (Netherlands) Benito van de Pas.
- Oldest Winner age 51: (England) Darryl Fitton.
