= Bernd Hebecker =

German darts player (born 1955)

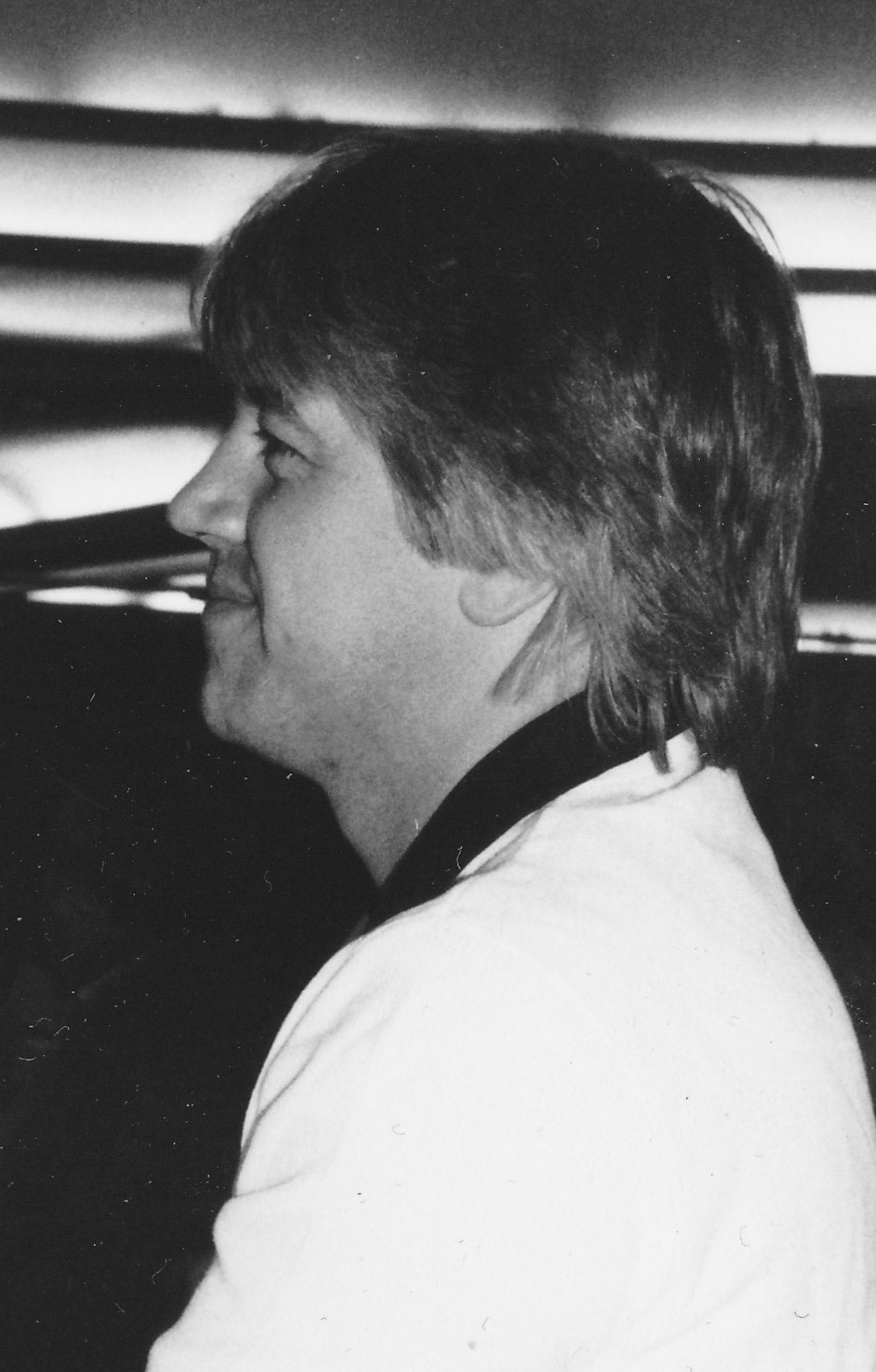
- Hebecker in 1982

Personal information
- Born: 5 October 1955 (age 71) Bremen, West Germany
- Home town: Bremen, Germany

Sport
- Sport: Darts
- Playing since: 1977
- Darts: 23g
- Laterality: Right-handed
- Walk-on music: "In the Air Tonight" by Phil Collins

Organisation (see split in darts)
- BDO: 1982–1999
- WDF: 1982–1999

WDF major events – best performances
- World Championship: Last 32: 1993
- World Masters: Last 64: 1984, 1993

Other tournament wins
- Years
Dortmund Open	1988
German Ch'ship	1984
German Gold Cup	1985, 1988
German Open	1986
Medal record
Men's Darts
Representing Germany
WDF Europe Cup
Bronze medal – third place	1992 Kerava	Men's singles

Bernd Hebecker (born 5 October 1955) is a German former professional darts player who played in British Darts Organisation (BDO) and World Darts Federation (WDF) events in the 1980s and 1990s. He was the first German player who qualified for the World Darts Championship and won a medal at the WDF Europe Cup.

== Career ==
In 1977, Hebecker started playing darts in the Bremen Broadway pub at the age of 22, where the first darts club in Bremen was founded soon after. The start of the first league in Bremen and other German cities soon followed, as well as the organisation of the first German Championships in the early 1980s. In 1981 Hebecker became German vice-champion in doubles, in 1983 he took second place in the national individual championships. In the 1980s he drew attention to himself with his first national titles. He belonged to the first national Germany team during the 1983 WDF World Cup. He lost in the first round match to Hiroshi Watanobe 4–3 in legs. In total, Hebecker represented Germany three times during the WDF World Cup and five times during the WDF Europe Cup.

After winning the German Championship in 1984, Hebecker won the German Open, Dortmund Open and being a two-time Champion of the German Gold Cup. In 1984 and 1985 he also served as President of the Deutschen Dart-Verbandes (German Darts Association), making him one of the pioneers of darts in Germany. In 1992, he won a bronze medal in singles competition at the 1992 WDF Europe Cup in Kerava. On the way to his first and only medal, he defeated Leo Laurens, Jocky Wilson, Øyvind Aasland and Bruno Ladovaz. He finally lost in semi-finals to John Lowe 4–3 in legs.

After good performance at the British Open, he was the first player from Germany to qualify for the BDO World Darts Championship. At the 1993 event he lost to Jann Hoffmann in the first round 3–0 in sets. Between 1996 and 1999 Hebecker turned his hobby into a career and played the entire British Darts Organisation tour as a professional player. He refused to compete in Professional Darts Corporation tournaments and retired in 2000.

== World Championship results ==
=== BDO ===
- 1993: First round (lost to Jann Hoffmann 0–3) (sets)

== Performance timeline ==
Tournament	1983	1984	1985	1986	1987	1988	1992	1993	1998
BDO Ranked televised events
World Championship	DNQ							1R	DNQ
World Masters	1R	2R	Prel.	1R	1R	1R	1R	2R	1R

Performance Table Legend
W	Won the tournament	F	Finalist	SF	Semifinalist	QF	Quarterfinalist	#R; RR; Prel.	Lost in # round Round-robin; Preliminary round	DQ	Disqualified
DNQ	Did not qualify	DNP	Did not participate	WD	Withdrew	NH	Tournament not held	#R; RR; Prel.	Lost in # round Round-robin; Preliminary round	NYF	Not yet founded
