= Dortmund Open =

Darts tournament

The Dortmund Open was a darts tournament that has been held from 1985 until 2012.

== List of winners ==
=== Men's ===
Year	Champion	Score	Runner-up	Total Prize Money	Champion	Runner-up
1985	(Netherlands) Ellis Elsevijf	?–?	(Netherlands) Paul Hoogenboom			
1986	(Netherlands) Jilles Vermaat	?–?	(Netherlands) Bert Vlaardingerbroek			
1987	(Netherlands) Bert Vlaardingerbroek	?–?	(Netherlands) Wiel Schreurs			
1988	(Germany) Bernd Hebecker	?–?	(Germany) Liam Burke			
1988	(Belgium) Stefan Eeckelaert	?–?	(Germany) Christian Groner	?	?	?
1989	(Germany) Kai Pfeiffer	?–?	(Germany) Alex Enders	?	?	?
1990	(Germany) Kai Pfeiffer	?–?	(Germany) Guido Kulik	?	?	?
1991	(Australia) Wayne Weening	?–?	(Germany) Christian Werner	?	?	?
1992	(Germany) Kai Pfeiffer	?–?	(Germany) Markus Schulte	?	?	?
1993	(Germany) Markus Schulte	?–?	(Germany) Colin Rice	?	?	?
1994	(Germany) Volker Backes	?–?	(Germany) Frank Mast	?	?	?
1995	(Germany) Volker Backes	beat	(Germany) Jurgen Nau			
1996	(Belgium) Pascal Rabau	?–?	(Belgium) Kurt Dumarey	?	?	?
1997	(Belgium) Rudy Delannoy	?–?	(Germany) Andreas Krockel	?	?	?
1998	(Belgium) Erik Clarys	?–?	(Germany) Andree Welge	?	?	?
1999	(Belgium) Eric Clarys	?–?	(Germany) Michael Rosenauer	?	?	?
2000	(Austria) Mensur Suljović	?–?	(Germany) Tomas Seyler	?	?	?
2001	(Belgium) Dirk Rosseel	?–?	(Belgium) Erik Clarys	?	?	?
2002	(Belgium) Erik Clarys	?–?	(Belgium) Alain van Bouwel	?	?	?
2003	(Germany) Thomas Wille	?–?	(Germany) Colin Rice	?	?	?
2004	(Germany) Markus Schulte	?–?	(Germany) Tomas Seyler	?	?	?
2005	(Netherlands) Martin Jonkers	?–?	(Netherlands) Ronnie Arts	?	?	?
2006	(Germany) Michael Rosenauer	3–2	(Germany) Karsten Wiegrebbe	?	?	?
2007	(Germany) Michael Rosenauer	3–1	(Germany) Marko Puls	€2,380	€750	€350
2008	(Belgium) Ronny Huybrechts	3–1	(Netherlands) Jerry Hendriks	€3,850	€1,000	€450
2009	(Netherlands) Gino Vos	3–1	(Belgium) Ronny Huybrechts	?	?	?
2010	(Norway) Robert Wagner	?–?	(Belgium) Davyd Venken	?	?	?
2011	(Belgium) Jean Marie Rubais	?–?	(Netherlands) Salmon Renyaan	€3,370	€1,000	€450
2012	(Denmark) Vladimir Andersen	3–1	(Germany) Dominik Wigmann	€3,370	€1,000	€450
2022	(Germany) Christian Soethe	7–6	(Germany) Andree Welge			
2023	(Germany) Michael Rosenauer	7–3	(Germany) Maik Langendorf			
2024	(Germany) Holger Krieg	7–5	(Germany) Rico Lubatsch			
2025	(Germany) Fred Barthel	7–4	(Germany) Gerd Vogelsang			
2026	(Germany) Manfred Bilderl	7–6	(Germany) Rene Pohl			

=== Women's ===
Year	Champion	Score	Runner-up	Total Prize Money	Champion	Runner-up
2024	(Germany) Irina Armstrong	6–5	(Norway) Tamara Schuur			
2025	(Germany) Irina Armstrong	6–4	(Germany) Sylvia Krieg			
2026	(Germany) Stefanie Rennoch	6–0	(Germany) Sylvia Krieg			
