= Finnish Open =

Finnish Open may refer to:

- Finnish Open (darts)
- Finnish Open (badminton)
- Finnish Open (golf)
