= Vlaardingerbroek =

Vlaardingerbroek is a Dutch-language surname. Notable people with the surname include:

- Bert Vlaardingerbroek, Dutch darts player
- Eva Vlaardingerbroek, Dutch conservative political commentator
