= 1993 BDO World Darts Championship =

BDO World Darts Championship

Tournament information
- Dates: 1–9 January 1993
- Venue: Lakeside Country Club
- Location: Frimley Green, Surrey
- Country: England
- Organisation(s): BDO
- Format: Sets; Final – best of 11
- Prize fund: £128,500
- Winner's share: £30,000
- High checkout: 170 (Netherlands) Raymond van Barneveld

Champion(s)
- (England) John Lowe

The 1993 BDO World Darts Championship (known for sponsorship reasons as The 1993 Embassy World Darts Championship) was the 16th staging of the competition, and it turned out to be the last time that the sport had a unified World Championship. In 1994 following a breakaway the PDC staged its own World Championship for the first time.

In 1989, the World Championship was the only darts tournament which had received television coverage, and a group of 16 players (including all but one of the previous World Champions) wanted to appoint a PR consultant to improve the image of the game. They created the World Darts Council (WDC), later the Professional Darts Corporation (PDC) in late January 1992, soon after a controversial VHS release of the 1992 World Final between Phil Taylor and Mike Gregory.

By the time of the 1993 World Championship, the WDC had already held their own tournament, the 1992 UK Masters (won by Mike Gregory) in October 1992. The tournament had been broadcast on Anglia Television, and the WDC players wanted to see their exposure to television coverage increase.

During the 1993 World Championship, the WDC players wore their new insignia on their sleeves. They were soon told to remove them by the tournament organisers, the BDO. The WDC players decided that if they were not going to be recognised by the BDO they would no longer play in the Championships.

During the tournament, the 16 WDC players released a statement saying that they would only play in the 1994 World Championship if it came under the auspices of the WDC, and that they only recognised the WDC as having the authority to sanction their participation in darts tournaments worldwide. Despite this statement, the BDO held firm and the WDC players instead held their own 1994 World Championship, now known as the Split in darts.

The second round saw several upset results including defeats of three former World Champions. Eric Bristow lost to Bob Anderson, while defending champion Phil Taylor lost to Kevin Spiolek. Dennis Priestley, the number one seed and tournament favourite, lost to Steve Beaton, despite Priestley having thrown a record average of 102.63 against Jocky Wilson in the first round. Other notable upsets during the tournament were Kevin Spiolek beating Kevin Kenny in the first round, Wayne Weening beating Rod Harrington in the first round, and Bobby George beating Mike Gregory in the quarter-finals.

John Lowe went on to beat Alan Warriner in a low-quality final and claim this last unified world title in the sports of darts - the third world title of Lowe's career. With his previous victories in 1979 and 1987, he became the first player to win the World title in three different decades.

This was Raymond van Barneveld's second world championship appearance (debut 1991), and he landed the highest checkout of the tournament, 170.

== Prize money ==
Total Prize fund was £128,500 (plus a £51,000 bonus for a nine-dart finish - not won)

- Champion £30,000
- Runner-up £15,000
- Semi-finalists £7,500
- Quarter-finalists £3,750
- 2nd round losers £2,000
- 1st round losers £1,800
- Highest checkout £1,500
- Non-qualifiers £400

== Seeds ==
1. (England) Dennis Priestley
2. (England) Mike Gregory
3. (England) Phil Taylor
4. (England) Rod Harrington
5. (England) Alan Warriner
6. (England) John Lowe
7. (Australia) Keith Sullivan
8. (England) Bob Anderson

== The Results ==
First Round (best of 5 sets)
1	(England) Dennis Priestley (102.63)	3
(Scotland) Jocky Wilson (96.09)	0
(England) Steve Beaton (96.21)	3
(England) Davy Richardson (88.71)	1
8	(England) Bob Anderson (90.48)	3
(England) Scott Coleman (90.90)	1
(England) Eric Bristow (86.67)	3
(Denmark) Per Skau (84.69)	1
5	(England) Alan Warriner (98.46)	3
(Northern Ireland) Mitchell Crooks (91.62)	0
(Scotland) Ronnie Sharp (94.47)	3
(New Zealand) Peter Hunt (82.44)	0
4	(England) Rod Harrington (93.39)	2
(Australia) Wayne Weening (86.64)	3
(Canada) Albert Anstey (82.71)	3
(United States) Sean Downs (73.62)	0
2	(England) Mike Gregory (94.77)	3
(Scotland) Jamie Harvey (86.91)	0
(Denmark) Jann Hoffmann (81.99)	3
(Germany) Bernd Hebecker (70.53)	0
7	(Australia) Keith Sullivan (88.89)	1
(England) Bobby George (86.55)	3
(Wales) Martin Phillips (87.27)	3
(United States) Dave Kelly (83.34)	1
6	(England) John Lowe (85.23)	3
(Wales) Chris Johns (79.56)	1
(Netherlands) Raymond van Barneveld (89.43)	3
(England) Graham Miller (85.68)	2
3	(England) Phil Taylor (91.59)	3
(Republic of Ireland) John Joe O'Shea (86.97)	1
(England) Kevin Spiolek (84.33)	3
(England) Kevin Kenny (82.95)	1

Second Round (best of 5 sets)
1	(England) Dennis Priestley (93.27)	1
(England) Steve Beaton (96.09)	3
8	(England) Bob Anderson (89.88)	3
(England) Eric Bristow (85.41)	0
5	(England) Alan Warriner (95.49)	3
(Scotland) Ronnie Sharp (88.83)	1
(Australia) Wayne Weening (93.93)	3
(Canada) Albert Anstey (89.07)	0
2	(England) Mike Gregory (91.56)	3
(Denmark) Jann Hoffmann (86.55)	1
(England) Bobby George (91.26)	3
(Wales) Martin Phillips (90.00)	0
6	(England) John Lowe (86.97)	3
(Netherlands) Raymond van Barneveld (89.43)	2
3	(England) Phil Taylor (87.93)	1
(England) Kevin Spiolek (86.49)	3

Quarter-finals (best of 7 sets)
(England) Steve Beaton (97.29)	4
8	(England) Bob Anderson (91.20)	1
5	(England) Alan Warriner (90.81)	4
(Australia) Wayne Weening (86.85)	1
2	(England) Mike Gregory (93.39)	2
(England) Bobby George (93.21)	4
6	(England) John Lowe (89.25)	4
(England) Kevin Spiolek (86.46)	3

Semi-finals (best of 9 sets)
(England) Steve Beaton (91.86)	2
5	(England) Alan Warriner (90.24)	5
(England) Bobby George (90.51)	3
6	(England) John Lowe (92.10)	5

Final (best of 11 sets)
5	(England) Alan Warriner (82.32)	3
6	(England) John Lowe (83.97)	6
