= Weltz =

Weltz is a surname of German origin. Notable people with the surname include:

- Gerda Weltz (born 1951), Danish darts player
- Johnny Weltz (born 1962), Danish road bicycle racer
- Scott Weltz (born 1987), American competition swimmer
