= Finnish Open (darts) =

Tournament information
- Venue: SOKOS Hotel
- Location: Helsinki
- Country: Finland
- Established: 1979
- Organisation(s): FDO / BDO, category C / WDF category 2
- Prize fund: €4,700
- Month(s) Played: May

Current champion(s)
- Jonas Masalin

The Finnish Open is a darts tournament that began in 1981. It was abandoned for a year before being recurred in 1983 where it has been held annually.

== List of tournaments ==
Year	Champion (average in final)	Score	Runner-up (average in final)	Total Prize Money	Champion	Runner-up
1981	(Finland) Kexi Heinäharju	?–?	(Finland) Risto Nurmela	?	?	?
1983	(Finland) Tapani Uitos	?–?	(Finland) Aimo Kuusio	?	?	?
1984	(England) Mike Gregory	?–?	(England) Colin Baker	?	?	?
1985	(England) Dave Whitcombe	?–?	(England) Cliff Lazarenko	?	?	?
1986	(Scotland) Jocky Wilson	?–?	(England) Mike Gregory	?	?	?
1987	(England) Mike Gregory	?–?	(England) Bob Anderson	?	?	?
1988	(England) Peter Evison	?–?	(England) Bob Anderson	?	?	?
1989	(England) Steve Gittins	?–?	(Denmark) Jann Hoffmann	?	?	?
1990	(England) Phil Taylor	?–?	(England) Alan Warriner-Little	?	?	?
1991	(Denmark) Per Skau	?–?	(Denmark) Jann Hoffmann	?	?	?
1992	(England) John Lowe	?–?	(Denmark) Jann Hoffmann	?	?	?
1993	(England) Alan Warriner-Little	?–?	(Netherlands) Roland Scholten	?	?	?
1994	(England) Andy Fordham	?–?	(Netherlands) Raymond van Barneveld	?	?	?
1995	(Netherlands) Raymond van Barneveld	?–?	(Australia) Peter Hinkley	?	?	?
1996	(England) Martin Adams	?–?	(England) Matt Clark	?	?	?
1997	(England) Mervyn King	?–?	(England) Ronnie Baxter	?	?	?
1998	(England) Ronnie Baxter	5–1	(England) Andy Jenkins	?	?	?
1999	(England) Paul Williams	?–?	(Belgium) Erik Clarys	?	?	?
2000	(England) Mervyn King	?–?	(Finland) Marko Pusa	?	?	?
2001	(Scotland) Bob Taylor	?–?	(England) Matt Clark	?	?	?
2002	(England) Martin Adams	?–?	(Finland) Jarkko Komula	?	?	?
2003	(Netherlands) Co Stompé	?–?	(England) Martin Atkins	?	?	?
2004	(Netherlands) Raymond van Barneveld	?–?	(Finland) Mika Forss	€4,360	€2,000	€800
2005	(Finland) Marko Pusa (95.34)	5–2	(England) Mervyn King (84.27)	?	?	?
2006	(England) Martin Atkins	?–?	(Netherlands) Jelle Klaasen	?	?	?
2007	(Austria) Dietmar Burger (91.68)	5–3	(Finland) Sami Sanssi (87.66)	€4,700	€2,000	€1,000
2008	(England) Steve West (86.43)	5–4	(Norway) Robert Wagner (87.99)	€4,700	€2,000	€1,000
2009	(Norway) Robert Wagner	5–4	(Sweden) Oskar Lukasiak	€4,700	€2,000	€1,000
2010	(England) Paul Knighton	5–2	(Netherlands) Johnny Nijs	€4,700	€2,000	€1,000
2011	(England) Paul Jennings	5–2	(Finland) Sami Sanssi	€4,700	€2,000	€1,000
2012	(Sweden) Johan Engström	6–5	(Sweden) Mats Andersson	€4,700	€2,000	€1,000
2013	(Latvia) Madars Razma	6–3	(Netherlands) Ron Meulenkamp	€4,300	€1,800	€900
2014	(Netherlands) Jeffrey de Graaf	6–5	(Lithuania) Darius Labanauskas	€4,700	€2,000	€1,000
2015	Daniel Larsson 81.30	7–3	Ulf Ceder 77.70	€4,700	€2,000	€1,000
2016	(Finland) Tony Alanentalo	def.	(Sweden) Daniel Larsson	€4,700	€2,000	€1,000
2017	(Russia) Boris Koltsov	def.	(Sweden) Edwin Torbjörnsson	€5,180	€2,000	€1,000
2018	(Russia) Boris Koltsov	def.	(Gibraltar) Hannu Suominen	€4,900	€2,000	€1,000
2023	(Sweden) Johan Engstrom	5-2	(Finland) Jonas Masalin	€4,900	€2,000	€1,000
2024	(Sweden) Edwin Torbjörnsson	5-1	(Sweden) Viktor Tingström	€2,400	€800	€400
2025	Jonas Masalin 88.53	5 - 1	(Netherlands) Stefan Schröder	€5,600	€1,600	€800
2026	Mursel Yavuz 103.66	5 - 0	Petri Rasmus 65.44	€5,600	€1,600	€800

== Tournament records ==
- Most wins 2: (England) Martin Adams, (England) Mervyn King, (England) Mike Gregory, (Netherlands) Raymond van Barneveld, (England) John Lowe.
- Most Finals 3: Mervyn King, (England) Mike Gregory, (Netherlands) Raymond van Barneveld, (Denmark) Jann Hoffmann .
- Most Semi Finals 4: (Finland) Jarkko Komula.
- Most Quarter Finals 5: (England) Mervyn King, (Finland) Ulf Ceder, (Finland) Marko Pusa, (Scotland) Bob Taylor, (England) Matt Clark.
- Most Appearances 8: (Finland) Sami Sanssi.
- Most Prize Money won €3,384: (Norway) Robert Wagner.
- Best winning average (95.67) : (Sweden) Daniel Larsson v's (Latvia) Madars Razma, 2015, Semi Final .
- Youngest Winner age 23: (Netherlands) Jeffrey de Graaf.
- Oldest Winner age 46: (England) John Lowe.

=== Nine-dart finishes ===
Player	Year (+ Round)	Method (single-in double-out)	Opponent	Result
(Finland) Asko Niskala	2024, 2nd Round	2 x T20, T19; 3 x T20; 2 x T20, D12	(Finland) Kenneth Ljungars	4 – 0

== See also ==
- List of BDO ranked tournaments
- List of WDF tournaments
