= John Joe O'Shea =

Irish darts player

Personal information
- Born: 28 November 1951 (age 74) Bantry, Ireland
- Home town: Bantry, County Cork, Ireland

Sport
- Sport: Darts
- Playing since: 1971
- Darts: 24g Datadart
- Laterality: Right-handed
- Walk-on music: "Make Me an Island" by Joe Dolan

Organisation (see split in darts)
- BDO: 1982–1996

WDF major events – best performances
- World Championship: Last 16: 1984
- World Masters: Last 16: 1982

Other tournament wins
- Tournament: Years
- Irish National Singles: 1985
- Updated on 1 September 2021

John Joe O'Shea (born 28 November 1951) is an Irish former professional darts player. From Bantry in West Cork, he is one of the most successful Irish players in history, having won the Irish National Darts Organisation National Singles title on six occasions as well as having made numerous appearances for his country.

== Career ==
O'Shea is a two-time winner of the Éire division of the News of the World Darts Championship, winning in 1983 and 1987. He represented Ireland in numerous WDF Europe Cup and WDF World Cup tournaments, most recently in 1996. He reached the last 16 of the singles at the 1982 WDF Europe Cup, losing to Cliff Lazarenko and the Quarter-Finals of the 1992 WDF Europe Cup singles, losing to eventual winner Phil Taylor.

O'Shea first qualified for the World Professional Darts Championship in 1984, beating Alex MacKinnon in the first round before losing to John Lowe in the last 16.

O'Shea competed in the Winmau World Masters on ten occasions, making his debut in 1982, beating English, Swedish and American opposition before losing to Eric Bristow in the last 16. Following a last 16 placing in the WDF World Cup singles in Edinburgh, he returned to the World Masters in 1983 as the number 16 seed, winning his first round game before losing to Wales's Kenneth Crook. He reached the last 32 in 1984 and 1991. He also qualified in 1985, 1986, 1989, 1992, 1994 and 1995.

He won the Irish National Darts Organisation National Singles title in 1985 and each year from 1991 to 1995.

== World Championship results ==
=== BDO ===
- 1984: Second round: (lost to John Lowe 0–4) (sets)
