= Henning von Essen =

Danish darts player

Personal information
- Born: 20 March 1964 (age 62) Sønderborg, Denmark

Sport
- Sport: Darts
- Playing since: 1982
- Darts: 18g Loxley
- Laterality: Right-handed
- Walk-on music: "The Cowboy Song" by Thin Lizzy

Organisation (see split in darts)
- BDO: 1986–1988

WDF major events – best performances
- World Masters: Last 128: 1987

Other tournament wins
- Tournament: Years
- Nordic Cup Open: 1987

Henning von Essen (born 20 March 1964) is a Danish former professional darts player.

== Career ==
Von Essen was picked 7 times for Denmark, and in 1987 won the Nordic Cup Open.

He was a dominating figure in Danish darts during the 1980s – but faded away in the beginning at the 1990s

He was part of the Danish team, who played the 1987 WDF World Cup on Danish soil. The same year he won the JFM championships, but amazingly he never won a Danish Championship

In 1988, with his brother Benny, he scored 722.330 points in 24 hours, which still is the Danish record for 2 players.
