= 1992 BDO World Darts Championship =

Tournament information
- Dates: 3–11 January 1992
- Venue: Lakeside Country Club
- Location: Frimley Green, Surrey
- Country: England
- Organisation(s): BDO
- Format: Sets; Final – best of 11
- Prize fund: £119,500
- Winner's share: £28,000
- High checkout: 170 (Australia) Keith Sullivan

Champion(s)
- (England) Phil Taylor

The 1992 BDO World Darts Championship (known for sponsorship reasons as the 1992 Embassy World Darts Championship) was held from 3–11 January 1992 at the Lakeside Country Club, Frimley Green, Surrey.

With Eric Bristow and defending champion Dennis Priestley both going out in round two, the way was paved for the top two seeds, Phil Taylor and Mike Gregory, to make it to the final – notably, the first final since the inauguration of the World Championship in 1978 that featured neither Bristow nor John Lowe.

In a titanic affair, full of big scores and high checkouts, it went to the final set and a tiebreak, where Gregory missed two chances each at double 8, double top and double 10 for the title. It also made Gregory the first player to miss darts at double to win a world championship and eventually lose; none would match this until Mark McGeeney in 2018.

Taylor took full advantage and sent the match to a sudden-death leg, which he won to take his second World title. Taylor's match-winning average of 97.58 remained a record for a BDO world championship final until the tournament's demise in 2020.

== Seeds ==
1. (England) Phil Taylor
2. (England) Mike Gregory
3. (England) Dennis Priestley
4. (England) John Lowe
5. (England) Bob Anderson
6. (Scotland) Jocky Wilson
7. (Australia) Keith Sullivan
8. (England) Eric Bristow

== Prize money ==
The prize fund was £116,400.

Champion: £28,000
Runner-Up: £14,000
Semi-Finalists (2): £7,000
Quarter-Finalists (4): £3,500
Last 16 (8): £2,600
Last 32 (16): £1,600

There was also a 9 Dart Checkout prize of £52,000, along with a High Checkout prize of £1,500.

== The Results ==
First Round (best of 5 sets)
1	(England) Phil Taylor (93.36)	3
(Sweden) Magnus Caris (78.81)	1
(Denmark) Per Skau (84.39)	3
(England) Dave Whitcombe (78.81)	1
8	(England) Eric Bristow (83.67)	3
(Denmark) Jann Hoffmann (80.61)	0
(Wales) Martin Phillips (82.26)	3
(Netherlands) Bert Vlaardingerbroek (74.34)	0
5	(England) Bob Anderson (89.55)	3
(England) Ronnie Baxter (91.68)	1
(England) Graham Miller (82.95)	3
(Belgium) Frans Devooght (82.65)	1
4	(England) John Lowe (90.51)	3
(Norway) Oyvind Aasland (85.65)	0
(Singapore) Paul Lim (86.34)	3
(Canada) Bob Sinnaeve (83.43)	1
2	(England) Mike Gregory (85.41)	3
(Australia) Wayne Weening (79.32)	1
(Wales) Chris Johns (79.98)	3
(England) Steve Beaton (77.45)	1
7	(Australia) Keith Sullivan (85.20)	3
(England) Peter Evison (85.05)	1
(England) Rod Harrington (89.91)	3
(Sweden) Stefan Nagy (69.93)	0
6	(Scotland) Jocky Wilson (80.73)	1
(England) Kevin Kenny (85.02)	3
(Scotland) Jamie Harvey (81.15)	3
(Finland) Heikki Hermunen (77.76)	0
3	(England) Dennis Priestley (90.93)	3
(United States) Larry Butler (85.23)	1
(England) Alan Warriner (86.34)	3
(Scotland) Alex Lister (77.49)	0

Second Round (best of 5 sets)
1	(England) Phil Taylor (94.65)	3
(Denmark) Per Skau (86.94)	1
8	(England) Eric Bristow (88.38)	2
(Wales) Martin Phillips (91.14)	3
5	(England) Bob Anderson (85.92)	2
(England) Graham Miller (79.38)	3
4	(England) John Lowe (92.83)	3
(Singapore) Paul Lim (79.74)	0
2	(England) Mike Gregory (86.82)	3
(Wales) Chris Johns (84.36)	0
7	(Australia) Keith Sullivan (94.44)	2
(England) Rod Harrington (93.15)	3
(England) Kevin Kenny (89.85)	3
(Scotland) Jamie Harvey (88.95)	2
3	(England) Dennis Priestley (93.99)	2
(England) Alan Warriner (91.56)	3

Quarter-Finals (best of 7 sets)
1	(England) Phil Taylor (98.49)	4
(Wales) Martin Phillips (88.74)	0
(England) Graham Miller (86.46)	3
4	(England) John Lowe (92.25)	4
2	(England) Mike Gregory (90.33)	4
(England) Rod Harrington (92.43)	3
(England) Kevin Kenny (89.82)	4
(England) Alan Warriner (88.71)	0

Semi-Finals (best of 9 sets)
1	(England) Phil Taylor (91.47)	5
4	(England) John Lowe (88.98)	4
2	(England) Mike Gregory (90.78)	5
(England) Kevin Kenny (86.28)	3

Final (best of 11 sets)
1	(England) Phil Taylor (97.58)	6
2	(England) Mike Gregory (94.42)	5
