= Peter Masson =

Personal information
- Full name: Peter Masson
- Born: 31 January 1945 Auchterarder, Perth, Scotland
- Died: 29 June 2010 (aged 65) Liverpool, Merseyside, England
- Home town: Auchterarder

Sport
- Sport: Darts
- Playing since: 1965
- Darts: 17g
- Laterality: Left-handed

Organisation (see split in darts)
- BDO: 1981–1993

WDF major events – best performances
- World Championship: Last 32: 1983, 1985
- World Masters: Last 32: 1981

Other tournament wins
- Tournament: Years
- Scottish Masters: 1981, 1988
- Updated on 20 March 2019

Peter Masson (31 January 1945 – 29 June 2010) was a Scottish-born English professional darts player who competed in the 1980s and 1990s. The longest-serving international captain in the history of the sport, he won his first cap for Scotland in 1980 and went on to lead his nation for 13 years.

== Career ==
Masson won the Merseyside Darts Championship no fewer than 8 times in his career and was also Scottish Masters champion in 1981 and 1988.

He appeared in the BDO World Darts Championship twice, losing in the first round on both occasions. In 1983, he lost 2–1 to Eric Bristow and in 1985 he lost 2–0 to Jocky Wilson. He also played in the 1981 Winmau World Masters, losing in the first round to Dave Whitcombe. Masson played in four British Professionals, losing in the first round in three of them and reaching the quarter-finals in 1982.

== Retirement and death ==
He retired from competitive darts in 2000 and died on 29 June 2010.

== World Championship results ==
=== BDO ===
- 1983: 1st round (lost to Eric Bristow 1–2)
- 1985: 1st round (lost to Jocky Wilson 0–2)
