= Jessica Larsson =

Swedish bridge player

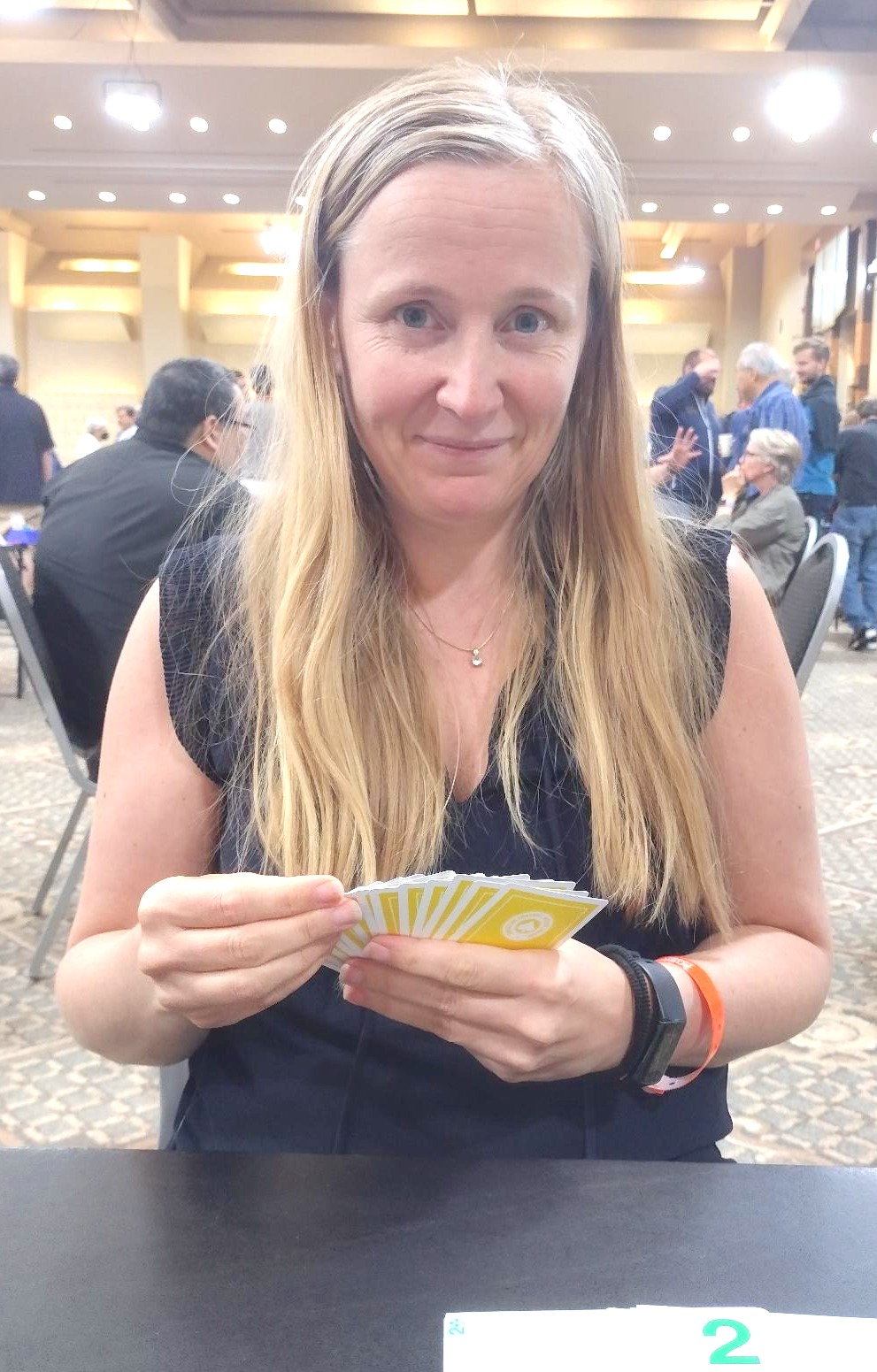

Jessica Larsson is a Swedish two-time world champion bridge player.

== Bridge accomplishments ==
=== Wins ===
- Venice Cup (2) 2019, 2022
