= Martin Phillips (darts player) =

Welsh darts player (born 1960)

Personal information
- Nicknames: Trashman; "The Welsh Legend"
- Born: 30 April 1960 (age 66) Dolgellau, Wales
- Home town: Dolgellau, Wales

Sport
- Sport: Darts
- Laterality: Left-handed
- Walk-on music: "Tubthumping" by Chumbawamba

Organisation (see split in darts)
- BDO: 1988–2019

WDF major events – best performances
- World Championship: Semi-final: 2010, 2011
- World Masters: Winner (1): 2014
- World Trophy: Runner-up 2017
- Finder Masters: Quarter-final: 2008, 2015, 2016

PDC premier events – best performances
- Grand Slam: Last 16: 2011

Other tournament wins
- Years
Austria Open Vienna	2014
Belgium Open	2014
German Masters	2014
Isle of Man Open	2017
Police Masters	2015
Romanian Open	2018
Turkish Open	2007, 2012, 2013, 2016
WDF Europe Cup Pairs	1994, 1998
WDF Europe Cup Singles	2010
WDF Europe Cup Team	2014
WDF World Cup Pairs	1994
WDF World Cup Team	1997
WDF World Cup Team	1997

Other achievements
- 2010 Bala Open; 2009 Border Classic; 2011 Clwyd Open; 2007 Turunc Open; 1999, 2004, 2006, 2010 Wales National Championships

Martin Phillips (born 30 April 1960) is a Welsh former professional darts player who competed in the British Darts Organisation (BDO). He won the 2014 World Masters championship.

== Darts career ==
=== 1988–1994 ===
Phillips was born in Dolgellau, and made his first televised darts appearance at the 1988 British Professional Championship reaching the last 16. In 1991, he appeared at his first World Championship losing in the first round to the defending champion Phil Taylor. In 1992 he defeated the Dutchman Bert Vlaardingerbroek 3–0 in the first round and knocked out five-time world champion Eric Bristow 3–2 in the second round to reach the quarter-final where he was defeated again by Taylor, who went on to clinch his second World title. He also played in 1993 and 1994, reaching the second round in both tournaments, losing both times to Bobby George. Phillips remained in the British Darts Organisation's events during the split in darts between 1993 and 1994 – but the first year after the split proved to be his last appearance at the Lakeside World Championship for nine years.

=== 1994–2006 ===
Although he failed to qualify for the World Championships for several years, he picked up two WDF Europe Cup pairs titles, in 1994 with Eric Burden and 1998 with Sean Palfrey – plus a WDF World Cup pairs title also with Palfrey in 1997. He had limited singles success for over a decade, with only three semi-final appearances at the Isle of Man Open (1996, 1997 and 2000)

He returned for the 2003 BDO World Darts Championship, but lost in the first round to John Walton and would then miss out on qualification for the event for the next three years, leaving him with just the one appearance at the Lakeside in 13 years.

=== 2007–2011 ===
In 2007, Phillips returned to the Lakeside but lost again in the first round, this time to Scotland's Paul Hanvidge. His form began to improve during 2007 with a tournament win at the Turunç Open in Turkey, and semi-final appearances at the Welsh Classic and Northern Ireland Open. Towards the end of 2007 he was on the receiving end of a defeat and a nine-dart finish by John Walton in their last 16 match at the 2007 Winmau World Masters.

At the 2008 BDO World Championship, Phillips beat Shaun Greatbatch in the last 32 but lost in the second round to reigning champion Martin Adams. Another first round exit followed in the 2009 BDO World Championship, losing 3–1 to Ross Montgomery, but he picked up the 2009 Border Classic title and reached the semi-finals of the Scottish Open and Welsh Classic.

In the 2010 BDO World Championship, Phillips went on to reach the semi-finals for the first time in his career beating seventh seed Dave Prins 3–0 in the first round, qualifier Paul Carter 4–2 in the second round and second seed Scott Waites in the quarter-finals. Phillips had gone into a 4–0 lead before Waites brought the scores level at 4–4, before Phillips showed better consistency in the final set to reach the last four where he was beaten 6–4 by Martin Adams.

In October 2010 he won the biggest title of his career so far by winning the WDF Europe Cup beating 2010 World Champion Martin Adams on the way to the final where he beat Willy van de Wiel 7–3. Two weeks later, he won seven matches to reach the semi-finals of the Winmau World Masters for the first time before losing to Stuart Kellett. In November 2010, Phillips made his first appearance at the Grand Slam of Darts having qualified through his runs to the semi-finals at the Lakeside. In the group stages, he beat Adrian Lewis (who went on to become PDC World Champion just two months later) 5–2 in legs. Phillips did not qualify from the group stages after losing 1–5 to Scott Waites and 4–5 to Co Stompé.

He made the semi-finals for the second year running at the 2011 BDO World Championship, beating Mark Barilli 3–0, Joey ten Berge 4–3 and Gary Robson 5–4, then lost a repeat of the previous year's semi-final match with Martin Adams 4–6.

He has appeared at 2011 Grand Slam of darts and he has had a better year then in 2010. He qualified from his group despite losing to Adrian Lewis 5–4 he claimed victories over Dutchman Co Stompé and Vincent van der Voort both 5–2, To set up a last 16 clash with fellow countryman and former World Champion Mark Webster who he lost 10–8 having led 3–0 and 8–5.

=== 2014: Masters Champion ===
After losing as an unseeded player to Wesley Harms in the first round of the World Championship in 2012, Phillips failed to qualify for Lakeside in either 2013 or 2014. However, he bounced back spectacularly by regaining his place in the world's top 8, before winning the first major TV title in his 26-year career at the Winmau World Masters. After reaching the semi-finals without dropping a set, Phillips survived a match dart in a deciding leg victory over Glen Durrant before beating Jamie Hughes 7–3 in the final. Phillips would become the BDO world number one in November that year. However, seeded fifth at the 2015 BDO World Championship, Phillips was defeated 3–0 by Madars Razma in the first round. At the 2015 Winmau World Masters, Phillips' title defence was ended at the quarter-final stage by Glen Durrant, who avenged his semi final loss to Phillips from the previous year.

=== 2019 ===
As of 16 November 2019, Phillips has not participated in any darts tournament.

== World Championship results ==
=== BDO ===
- 1991: 1st round (lost to Phil Taylor 1–3)
- 1992: Quarter–finals (lost to Phil Taylor 0–4)
- 1993: 2nd round (lost to Bobby George 0–3)
- 1994: 2nd round (lost to Bobby George 1–3)
- 2003: 1st round (lost to John Walton 2–3)
- 2007: 1st round (lost to Paul Hanvidge 2–3)
- 2008: 2nd round (lost to Martin Adams 0–4)
- 2009: 1st round (lost to Ross Montgomery 1–3)
- 2010: Semi–finals (lost to Martin Adams 4–6)
- 2011: Semi–finals (lost to Martin Adams 4–6)
- 2012: 1st round (lost to Wesley Harms 1–3)
- 2015: 1st round (lost to Madars Razma 0–3)
- 2016: 2nd round (lost to Dennis Harbour 1–4)
- 2017: 1st round (lost to Paul Hogan 2–3)
- 2018: 2nd round (lost to Michael Unterbuchner 2–4)
- 2019: 1st round (lost to Conan Whitehead 2–3)

== Career finals ==
=== BDO major finals: 2 (1 title) ===
Legend
Winmau World Masters (1–0)
BDO World Trophy (0–1)

Outcome	No.	Year	Championship	Opponent in the final	Score
Winner	1.	2014	Winmau World Masters	(England) Jamie Hughes	7–3 (s)
Runner-up	1.	2017	BDO World Trophy	(Australia) Peter Machin	8-10 (l)

=== WDF major finals: 2 (1 title) ===
Legend
World Cup (0–1)
Europe Cup (1–0)

Outcome	No.	Year	Championship	Opponent in the final	Score
Runner-up	1.	1991	World Cup Singles	(England) John Lowe	4–6 (l)
Winner	1.	2010	Europe Cup Singles	(Netherlands) Willy van de Wiel	7–3 (s)

== Performance timeline ==
Tournament	1988	1989	1990	1991	1992	1993	1994	1995	1996	1997	1998	1999	2000	2001	2002	2003	2004	2005	2006	2007	2008	2009	2010	2011	2012	2013	2014	2015	2016	2017	2018	2019
BDO World Championship	DNQ			1R	QF	2R	2R	DNQ								1R	DNQ			1R	2R	1R	SF	SF	1R	DNQ		1R	2R	1R	2R	1R
Winmau World Masters	DNP			4R	2R	4R	3R	2R	DNP	RR	DNP	3R	2R	DNP		2R	2R	3R	5R	6R	1R	2R	SF	6R	3R	2R	W	QF	5R	QF	4R	
British Professional	2R	Not held																														
Finder Darts Masters	Not held												DNP						NH	RR	QF	DNP					RR	QF	QF	DNP		
BDO World Trophy	Not held																										DNQ	2R	2R	F	1R	
Grand Slam of Darts	Not held																			DNQ			RR	2R	RR	DNQ		RR	DNQ			

Performance Table Legend
W	Won the tournament	F	Finalist	SF	Semifinalist	QF	Quarterfinalist	#R; RR; L#	Lost in # round Round-robin; Last # stage	DQ	Disqualified
DNQ	Did not qualify	DNP	Did not participate	WD	Withdrew	NH	Tournament not held	#R; RR; L#	Lost in # round Round-robin; Last # stage	NYF	Not yet founded
