= Vladimir Andersen =

Danish darts player

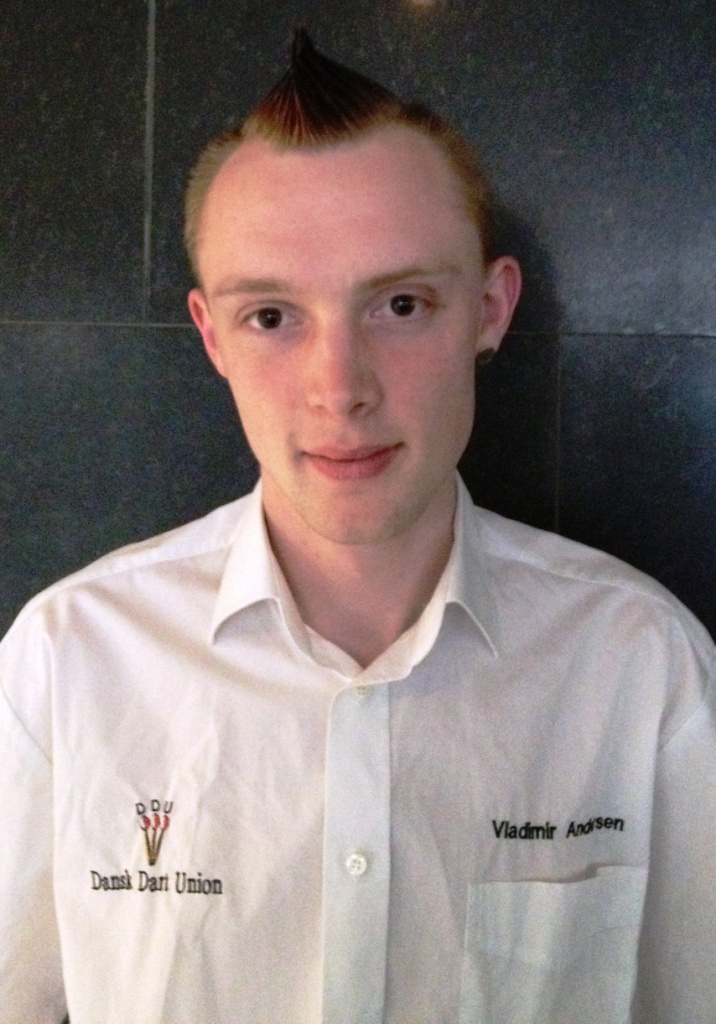

Personal information
- Full name: Vladimir Kim Andersen
- Nickname: "Valle"
- Born: 24 April 1989 (age 37) Vejle, Denmark
- Home town: Vejle, Denmark

Sport
- Sport: Darts
- Playing since: 2003
- Darts: 22g
- Laterality: Right-handed
- Walk-on music: "My Life Is a Party" by ItaloBrothers

Organisation (see split in darts)
- BDO: 2009–2018
- PDC: 2018–2024 (Tour Card: 2022–2023)

WDF major events – best performances
- World Masters: Last 24: 2009

PDC premier events – best performances
- UK Open: Last 160: 2022

Other tournament wins
- Years
| German Gold Cup | 2010 |
| Danish National Championship | 2009 |
| Dortmund Open | 2012 |
| PDCNB Denmark | 2022 |
| PDCNB Iceland | 2023 |

Vladimir Kim Andersen (born 24 April 1989) is a Danish professional darts player.

== Career ==
He partnered Per Laursen in the 2010 World Cup of Darts losing in the first round to Austria.

He won the German Gold Cup and Dortmund Open in 2012, beating respectively Tobias Muller and Dominik Wiegmann. At the 2012 Nordic Invitational, he won the pairs event together with Frede Johansen beating Daniel Larsson and Johan Engström from Sweden in the final.

Andersen was scheduled to play Sweden's Peter Sajwani at the 2016 BDO World Darts Championship but was removed from the field on 27 November 2015 after being suspended by the Danish Darts Union.

At 2022 PDC Q-School, Andersen obtained a PDC Tour Card after finishing 10th in the European Order of Merit, with a total of 6 points.

== Performance timeline ==
=== BDO ===
| Tournament | 2008 | 2009 | 2011 | 2012 | 2015 |
|---|---|---|---|---|---|
| World Masters | L40 | L24 | L136 | L272 | L80 |

=== PDC ===
| Tournament | 2010 | 2022 | 2023 |
|---|---|---|---|
PDC Ranked televised events
| World Championship | Did not qualify | | |
| UK Open | DNQ | 1R | 1R |
PDC Non-ranked televised events
| World Cup | 1R | 2R | 2R |
Career statistics
| Year-end ranking | - | 181 | 143 |

==== European Tour ====
| Tournament | 2023 |
|---|---|
| Hungarian Trophy | 1R |

==== Players Championships ====
| Season | 1 | 2 | 3 | 4 | 5 | 6 | 7 | 8 | 9 | 10 | 11 | 12 | 13 | 14 | 15 | 16 | 17 | 18 | 19 | 20 | 21 | 22 | 23 | 24 | 25 | 26 | 27 | 28 | 29 | 30 |
|---|---|---|---|---|---|---|---|---|---|---|---|---|---|---|---|---|---|---|---|---|---|---|---|---|---|---|---|---|---|---|
| 2022 | DNP | | | | BAR; 2R | BAR; 1R | NIE; 1R | NIE; 1R | BAR; 1R | BAR; 1R | BAR; 3R | BAR; 1R | BAR; 1R | WIG; 1R | WIG; 1R | NIE; 1R | NIE; 1R | BAR; 1R | BAR; 1R | BAR; 1R | BAR; 1R | BAR; Did not participate | | | | | | | | |
| 2023 | BAR; 2R | BAR; 3R | BAR; DNP | | | | HIL; 1R | HIL; 1R | WIG; DNP | | LEI; 1R | LEI; 1R | HIL; 1R | HIL; 2R | LEI; DNP | | HIL; 2R | HIL; 1R | BAR; 4R | BAR; 1R | BAR; 1R | BAR; 1R | BAR; 1R | BAR; 1R | BAR; 1R | BAR; 2R | BAR; 1R | BAR; 1R | BAR; 1R | BAR; 1R |

Performance Table Legend
| W | Won the tournament | F | Finalist | SF | Semifinalist | QF | Quarterfinalist | #R; RR; L# | Lost in # round Round-robin; Last # stage | DQ | Disqualified |
| DNQ | Did not qualify | DNP | Did not participate | WD | Withdrew | NH | Tournament not held | #R; RR; L# | Lost in # round Round-robin; Last # stage | NYF | Not yet founded |
