= Øyvind Aasland =

Norwegian darts player (born 1967)

Personal information
- Full name: Oyvind Aasland
- Born: 11 November 1967
- Died: 24 September 2026 (aged 59) Oslo, Norway

Sport
- Sport: Darts
- Playing since: 1988
- Darts: 22g
- Laterality: Right-handed
- Walk-on music: "Nu Flow" by Big Brovaz

Organisation (see split in darts)
- BDO: 1991–2012
- WDF: 1991–2012

WDF major events – best performances
- World Championship: Last 32: 1992
- World Masters: Last 32: 1995
- Updated on 6 April 2008

Øyvind Aasland (11 November 1967 - 24 September 2026) was a Norwegian former professional darts player who competed in British Darts Organisation (BDO) events.

Aasland competed at the 1992 BDO World Darts Championship, where he was defeated by former World Champion John Lowe 3–0 in the first round. He was the second Norwegian to play in the World Professional Darts Championship, with Knud Nilsen being the first, playing in the previous year. He also played in the 1995 Winmau World Masters, losing in the first round to then reigning World Master and World Champion Richie Burnett. Aasland was Norwegian Champion 34 times (May 2011).

== World Championship results ==
=== BDO ===
- 1992: 1st Round (lost to John Lowe 0–3) (sets)
