= Jack McKenna =

Irish darts player

Personal information
- Born: 10 March 1942 (age 84) Newbridge, County Kildare, Ireland

Sport
- Sport: Darts
- Playing since: 1960
- Darts: 36g Unicorn
- Laterality: Right-handed
- Walk-on music: "The Irish Rover" by The Pogues & The Dubliners

Organisation (see split in darts)
- BDO: 1974–2000, 2006–2007
- PDC: 2002–2005

WDF major events – best performances
- World Championship: Last 16: 1990
- World Masters: Quarter Finals: 1974

PDC premier events – best performances
- World Grand Prix: Last 16: 2002

Other tournament wins
- Tournament: Years
- O'Shea Cup Mens Singles: 1994, 2000, 2003, 2004

Jack McKenna (born 10 March 1942) is an Irish former professional darts player who played in British Darts Organisation (BDO) and Professional Darts Corporation (PDC) tournaments.

== Darts career ==
From Newbridge, County Kildare, McKenna started playing darts at the age of 20. He reached the quarter-finals of the inaugural Winmau World Masters in 1974. In 1989, he reached the final of the WDF World Cup, losing to Eric Bristow.

It was at the 1990 BDO World Darts Championship where McKenna became notorious within the game, as the man on the receiving end of the first nine-dart finish at the World Championship, achieved by Paul Lim of the United States. McKenna had earlier beaten Peter Evison in the first round before losing to Lim in the second round.

He returned to television in the 2002 PDC World Grand Prix, beating Cliff Lazarenko in the first round before losing to Phil Taylor. He returned to the event in 2004, but lost in the first round to Dennis Priestley.

McKenna tried to qualify for the 2008 BDO World Championship but lost in the very first round.

During his career, McKenna claimed to not practice at playing darts at all. He is a non-drinker.

== World Championship results ==
=== BDO ===
- 1990: Second round (lost to Paul Lim 2–3) (sets)

=== WDF major finals: 1 (1 runners-up) ===
Legend
World Cup (0–1)

Outcome	No.	Year	Championship	Opponent in the final	Score
Runner-up	1.	1989	World Cup Singles	(England) Eric Bristow	1–4 (l)
