= Bert Vlaardingerbroek =

Dutch darts player (born 1960)

Personal information
- Nickname: "Big Bert"
- Born: 24 March 1960 (age 66) The Hague, Netherlands

Sport
- Sport: Darts
- Playing since: 1983
- Darts: 28g Datadart
- Laterality: Right-handed
- Walk-on music: "Two Tribes" by Frankie Goes to Hollywood

Organisation (see split in darts)
- BDO: 1985–1999
- PDC: 2003–2006

WDF major events – best performances
- World Championship: Last 32: 1988, 1989, 1990, 1992
- World Masters: Quarter Finals: 1986

Other tournament wins
- Tournament: Years
- Dortmund Open Spring Cup Amsterdam Open: 1987; 1993; 1999

Bert Vlaardingerbroek (born 24 March 1960) is a Dutch former professional darts player who has competed in events of the British Darts Organisation (BDO), Professional Darts Corporation (PDC), and World Darts Federation (WDF).

Vlaardingerbroek was the first Dutch darter to qualify for a world championship tournament.

== Career ==
In 1985 he was the first Dutch darter who qualified for the WDF World Cup, his represented Team Holland with Ellis Elsevijf, Paul Hoogenboom & Graeme Stoddart was not going to Brisbane, Queensland in Australia of 1985.

In 1988 he was the first Dutch darter who qualified for the BDO World Darts Championship.

Vlaardingerbroek made four BDO World Darts Championship appearances and lost in the first round each time, losing to Bob Anderson in 1988, Dennis Hickling in 1989, Cliff Lazarenko in 1990 and Martin Phillips in 1992.

He also played in the Winmau World Masters thirteen times, his best performance was a quarter finals in 1986, who beating Paul Shefford, Alex MacKinnon, Lars Erik Karlsson, Mike Gregory and Lyndon Hextall before losing to Jocky Wilson.

His most successful period in the game came during 1992–93, when he reached the final of the Swiss Open (1992) and twice reached the last four of the Dutch Open (1992–93). He also reached the quarter-finals of the Swiss Open and Belgian Open in 1993. The 1993 Swiss event was the first event to suffer the loss of the 16 "rebel" players who had formed the World Darts Council which led to the split in darts.

The loss of the top players from the BDO/WDF led to opportunities for players to make progress up the world rankings. However, Vlaardingerbroek was not one of those who capitalised and faded from the scene after the 1993 World Masters.

He never featured in the final stages of a major event until reaching the last 32 of the Winmau World Masters in 1999 and then competed in some PDC Pro Tour events in 2003, 2005 & 2006 in his native country, which invites resident country players to compete without having to commit to affiliation of the Professional Dart Players Association.

== World Championship results ==
=== BDO ===
- 1988: 1st Round: (lost to Bob Anderson 1–3) (sets)
- 1989: 1st Round: (lost to Dennis Hickling 0–3)
- 1990: 1st Round: (lost to Cliff Lazarenko 2–3)
- 1992: 1st Round: (lost to Martin Phillips 0–3)

== Performance timeline ==
Tournament	1985	1986	1987	1988	1989	1990	1991	1992	1993	1994	1995	1996	1997	1998	1999
BDO World Championship	Did not qualify			1R	1R	1R	DNQ	1R	Did not qualify						
Winmau World Masters	2R	QF	2R	RR	1R	4R	2R	4R	3R	1R	2R	DNQ		2R	3R
News of the World	???					RR	Not held						DNP	Not held	

Performance Table Legend
DNP	Did not play at the event	DNQ	Did not qualify for the event	NYF	Not yet founded	#R	lost in the early rounds of the tournament (WR = Wildcard round, RR = Round robin)
QF	lost in the quarter-finals	SF	lost in the semi-finals	F	lost in the final	W	won the tournament
