= Gerda Weltz =

Danish darts player

Personal information
- Full name: Gerda Søgaard Weltz
- Born: 16 January 1951 (age 75) Skive, Denmark
- Home town: Middelfart, Denmark

Sport
- Sport: Darts
- Laterality: Right-handed

Organisation (see split in darts)
- BDO: 1985–2006

Other tournament wins
- Tournament: Years
- Danish National Ch'ship Denmark Open Viking Masters: 1989, 1992, 1995 1996; 1989, 1993, 1994

Gerda Søgaard Weltz (née Pedersenborn; born 16 January 1951) is a Danish former female darts player.

Weltz is a three-time Danish singles champion and a former winner of the Denmark Open. She was picked 15 times for the Danish national team, and continued as a national team manager after she stopped playing – until 2012 when she withdrew from the sport.
