= Kexi Heinäharju =

Finnish darts player

Personal information
- Full name: Keijo Heinaharjo
- Nickname: Kexi
- Born: 2 February 1955 (age 71) Jyvaskyla, Finland
- Home town: Jyvaskyla, Finland

Sport
- Sport: Darts
- Playing since: 1975
- Darts: 19g Tungsten
- Laterality: Right-handed
- Walk-on music: "Reach Up" by Perfecto Allstarz

Organisation (see split in darts)
- BDO: 1981–1993

WDF major events – best performances
- World Championship: Last 16: 1984

Other tournament wins
- Tournament: Years
- Finnish Open: 1981

Keijo "Kexi" Heinäharju (born 2 February 1955) is a Finnish former professional darts player.

== Darts career ==
Heinäharju won the 1981 Finland Open, beating fellow Finn Risto Nurmela in the final. He first qualified for the BDO World Darts Championship in 1984, defeating Danny Inglis in the first round before losing to Ceri Morgan in round two. He would make three further appearances in the World Championships in 1987, 1989 and 1991 but lost in the first round each time to Paul Lim, Steve Gittins and Eric Bristow.

== World Championship Results ==
=== BDO ===
- 1984: Second Round (lost to Ceri Morgan 1–4) (sets)
- 1987: First Round (lost to Paul Lim 1–3)
- 1989: First Round (lost to Steve Gittins 0–3)
- 1991: First Round (lost to Eric Bristow 0–3)
