= Leo Laurens =

Belgian darts player

Personal information
- Nickname: "The Lion of Antwerp"
- Born: 30 July 1952 (age 74) Antwerp, Belgium
- Home town: Itegem, Belgium

Sport
- Sport: Darts
- Playing since: 1972
- Darts: 21g
- Laterality: Right-handed
- Walk-on music: "Good Times" by Jimmy Barnes and INXS

Organisation (see split in darts)
- BDO: 1988–1999

WDF major events – best performances
- World Championship: Quarter-final: 1997
- World Masters: Last 32: 1988, 1993, 1995
- Dutch Open: Winner (1): 1992

Other tournament wins
- Tournament: Years
- Belgium Gold Cup Belgium National Championship Antwerp Open French Open North Holland Open: 1988, 1993, 1996; 1989, 1990, 1992; 1990; 1990, 1992; 1995

Leo Laurens (born 30 July 1952) is a Belgian former professional darts player who competed in British Darts Organisation (BDO) events. At the end of 1993, he was number one in the WDF world rankings after all of the BDO's top players broke away to form the World Darts Council (now the Professional Darts Corporation, PDC).

== Career ==
Laurens made his World Championship debut in 1989, losing in the first round to American Rick Ney. He returned a year later, beating Canada's Bob Sinnaeve, before losing to Mike Gregory. His best performance came in 1997, where he reached the quarter-finals after beating Ritchie Davies and Richie Burnett. He lost to reigning champion Steve Beaton. Laurens also holds the record for most 180's scored in a first-round match at the World Championship, with nine, although John Henderson holds the record for a best of 5 sets match with 12.

He also played in the Winmau World Masters in 1988, 1993, and 1995, losing in the first round on each occasion.

== World Championship performances ==
=== BDO ===
- 1989: 1st round (lost to Rick Ney 1–3) (sets)
- 1990: 2nd round (lost to Mike Gregory 1–3)
- 1994: 2nd round (lost to Magnus Caris 0–3)
- 1996: 1st round (lost to Raymond van Barneveld 0–3)
- 1997: Quarter-finals (lost to Steve Beaton 3–4)
