= Jann Hoffmann =

Danish darts player (1957–2023)

Personal information
- Born: 19 July 1957 Vejle, Denmark
- Died: 16 January 2023 (aged 65)
- Home town: Holstebro, Denmark

Sport
- Sport: Darts
- Playing since: 1977
- Darts: 18g Target Darts Signature
- Laterality: Right-handed
- Walk-on music: "The Wild Boys" by Duran Duran

Organisation (see split in darts)
- BDO: 1988–1994, 2001, 2003
- PDC: 2006–2018

WDF major events – best performances
- World Championship: Last 16: 1990, 1993
- World Masters: Last 32: 1990, 1992

Other tournament wins
- Tournament: Years
- Danish National Championship Nordic Championship: 1988, 1991 1988, 1991

Jann Hoffmann (19 July 1957 – 16 January 2023) was a Danish professional darts player who competed in Professional Darts Corporation (PDC) events.

== Career ==
Hoffmann played at the BDO World Darts Championship four times. In 1990, he caused a major shock, beating former world champion Bob Anderson in the first round. He eventually lost to Cliff Lazarenko in the second round. He repeated this performance in 1993, beating Bernd Hebecker in the first round but lost to 1992 runner-up Mike Gregory. He also played in the Winmau World Masters twice, in 1990 and 1992, losing in the first round on both occasions. Hoffmann also made the final of the 1991 Dutch Open, the 1993 Swedish Open and the Finnish Open final three times.

After the 1994 Danish Open, Hoffmann stopped playing due to heart problems. However, in 2006, Hoffmann returned to the oche at the Players Championship in the Netherlands, operated by the Professional Darts Corporation. Hoffmann also signed up to the PDPA.

Hoffmann represented Denmark with Per Laursen in the 2012 PDC World Cup of Darts and together they were beaten 3–1 by Northern Ireland in the second round, having defeated Gibraltar in round 1. He partnered Laursen once again in the 2013 World Cup of Darts and despite beating South Africa 5–4 in their first match, they finished bottom of Group B on leg difference following a 5–0 loss to the Republic of Ireland.

== Personal life ==
Hoffmann was married to Hanne up until her death in 2019. The couple had one daughter.

Hoffmann died on 16 January 2023 following a long illness. He was 65.

== World Championship results ==
=== BDO ===
- 1990: 2nd Round (lost to Cliff Lazarenko 0–3) (sets)
- 1992: 1st Round (lost to Eric Bristow 0–3)
- 1993: 2nd Round (lost to Mike Gregory 1–3)
- 1994: 1st Round (lost to Colin Monk 0–3)
