= 1994 WDF Europe Cup =

Tournament information
- Venue: Solnahallen
- Location: Stockholm
- Country: Sweden
- Established: 13-15 October
- Organisation(s): WDF
- Format: Legs

Champion(s)
- Singles; Steve Beaton (men's singles); Deta Hedman (women's singles); Pairs (Wales) Eric Burden & Martin Phillips (men's pairs) (England) Tammy Montgomery & Deta Hedman (women's pairs); Team; England (men's team); Overall; England (men's overall); England (women's overall)

The 1994 WDF Europe Cup was the 9th edition of the WDF Europe Cup darts tournament, organised by the World Darts Federation. It was held in Stockholm, Sweden from 13 to 15 October.

== Entered teams ==
24 countries/associations entered a men's selection in the event.

18 countries/associations entered a woman's selection in the event.

Nr.	Country	Men's Selection
1	Belgium	Marcel De Vuyst, Pascal Rabau, Leo Laurens, Stefan Eeckelaert
2	Cyprus	George Trypiniotis, Demetris Georgiou, Costas Constantinou, Theo Nicodimou
3	Czech Republic	Jiri Tomanec, Tony Kamernicky, Albert Kolinsky, Blaine Karst
4	Denmark	Jann Hoffmann, Per Skau, Troels Rusel, Stig Jørgensen
5	England	Kevin Kenny, Steve Beaton, Ronnie Baxter, Martin Adams
6	Finland	Ari Ilmanen, Seppo Uutela, Risto Sundgren, Heikki Hermunen
7	France	Stephane Dalancon, Serge Farrando, Pascal Fontaine, Frederic Hogiun
8	Germany	Volker Backes, Andree Welge, Andreas Krockel, Marcus Schulte
9	Greece	Dionissis Pilichos, Tasos Miliotis, Stathis Pantelidis, Paris Chloros
10	Gibraltar	George Federico, Michael Robinson, Francis Taylor, Leslie Ward
11	Hungary	Karoly Kocsis, Sandor Kovacs, Attila Mayer, Istvan Sebestyen
12	Ireland	Brendan McDermott, Danial Maguire, Mick McGowan, Des Byrne
13	Isle of Man	David Clucas, Steve Dentith, Paul Sertin, Paul Whitehead
14	Italy	Giorgio Sartor, Giancarlo Scibetta, Giuseppe Quintiero, Domenico Callegari
15	Latvia	Eglis Vitols, Alexander Gubin, Janis Straume, Uldis Erkis
16	Netherlands	Braulio Roncero, Bert Vlaardingerbroek, Roland Scholten, Raymond van Barneveld
17	Northern Ireland	Charlie Gaile, Louis Doherty, Francis McMahon, Norman Beggs
18	Norway	Øyvind Aasland, Helge Knapskog, Thor-Helmer Johansen, Arild Folgerø
19	Russia	Andrei Podiosinskiy, Dmitri Ostashev, Oleg Ostashev, Dimitry Maslennikov
20	Scotland	Stephen Parkes, Les Wallace, Bob Taylor, Danny Cunningham
21	Sweden	Göran Klemme, Stefan Nagy, Jonas Bergström, Nils-Gunnar Manshed
22	Switzerland	Pierre Steiner, Noel Schlaeppi, Walter Tschudin, Gaudenz Coray
23	Spain	Pedro Minan-Martinez, Salvador Mira-de-Dios, Rafael Ramos-Fuertes, Juan Salpico
24	Wales	Eric Burden, Martin Phillips, Sean Palfrey, Richie Burnett

Nr.	Country	Woman's Selection
1	Czech Republic	Kveta Drahuska & Eva Hrinova
2	Denmark	Gerda Søgaard-Weltz & Ann-Louise Peters
3	England	Tammy Montgomery & Deta Hedman
4	Finland	Eila Nikander & Paivi Jussila
5	France	Josiane Lefebre & Sophie Flieler
6	Germany	Heike Ernst & Gaby Kosuch
7	Greece	Xeni Koutika & Yiota Kouranou
8	Ireland	Maureen Owens & Sharon Rafter
9	Italy	Monica Zago & Nadia Moschion
10	Latvia	Nadedja Boltatch & Galina Gubina
11	Netherlands	Valerie Maytum & Francis Hoenselaar
12	Northern Ireland	Rhonda Henry & Norma Irvine
13	Norway	Karin Nordahl & Mette Engen-Hansen
14	Russia	Maria Novikova & Marina Tsariova
15	Scotland	Cathie Gibson-McCulloch & Janette Youngson
16	Sweden	Ewa Berg & Kristina Korpii
17	Switzerland	Andrea Tanner & Barbara Pfister
18	Wales	Leeanne Maddock & Sandra Greatbatch

== Men's singles ==
1st Round (best of 7 legs)
(Wales) Richie Burnett	4
(Gibraltar) George Federico	0
(Latvia) Uldis Erkis
Bye
(Finland) Seppo Uutela
Bye
(Denmark) Stig Jørgensen	4
(Czech Republic) Tony Kamernicky	3
(England) Ronnie Baxter	4
(Gibraltar) Francis Taylor	1
(France) Stephane Dalancon
Bye
(Scotland) Les Wallace	4
(Republic of Ireland) Brendan McDermott	1
(Northern Ireland) Norman Beggs
Bye
(Netherlands) Raymond van Barneveld	4
(Gibraltar) Michael Robinson	0
(Sweden) Göran Klemme
Bye
(Belgium) Leo Laurens	4
(Russia) Dmitri Ostashev	0
(Italy) Giancarlo Scibetta
Bye
(Denmark) Helge Knapskog
Bye
(Cyprus) George Trypiniotis
Bye
(Germany) Andree Welge	4
(Gibraltar) Leslie Ward	3
(Switzerland) Pierre Steiner	4
(Greece) Dionissis Pilichos	1
(Republic of Ireland) Des Byrne
Bye
(Russia) Dimitry Maslennikov
Bye
(Denmark) Per Skau
Bye
(Belgium) Stefan Eeckelaert	4
(Italy) Giorgio Sartor	1
(Northern Ireland) Francis McMahon
Bye
(Switzerland) Noel Schlaeppi
Bye
(Netherlands) Braulio Roncero	4
(Finland) Heikki Hermunen	1
(Greece) Paris Chloros
Bye
(England) Steve Beaton
Bye
(Cyprus) Demetris Georgiou
Bye
(Wales) Sean Palfrey
Bye
(France) Frederic Hogiun	4
(Latvia) Janis Straume	2
(Scotland) Danny Cunningham
Bye
(Czech Republic) Albert Kolinsky
Bye
(Germany) Volker Backes
Bye
(Norway) Thor-Helmer Johansen	4
(Sweden) Stefan Nagy	1
(Denmark) Jann Hoffmann
Bye
(England) Kevin Kenny
Bye
(Scotland) Bob Taylor
Bye
(Germany) Andreas Kröckel	4
(Northern Ireland) Charlie Gaile	1
(Wales) Eric Burden
Bye
(Greece) Stathis Pantelidis
Bye
(Norway) Øyvind Aasland
Bye
(Switzerland) Walter Tschudin	4
(Cyprus) Costas Constantinou	0
(Sweden) Jonas Bergström
Bye
(Russia) Oleg Ostashev
Bye
(Netherlands) Roland Scholten
Bye
(Republic of Ireland) Mick McGowan	4
(Italy) Domenico Callegari	1
(Belgium) Marcel De Vuyst
Bye
(Latvia) Alexander Gubin
Bye
(Finland) Ari Ilmanen
Bye
(France) Pascal Fontaine	4
(Czech Republic) Blaine Karst	2
(Denmark) Troels Rusel
Bye
(Republic of Ireland) Danial Maguire
Bye
(England) Martin Adams	4
(Norway) Arild Folgerø	0
(Belgium) Pascal Rabau
Bye
(Germany) Marcus Schulte
Bye
(Sweden) Nils-Gunnar Manshed
Bye
(Wales) Martin Phillips	4
(Cyprus) Theo Nicodimou	0
(France) Serge Farrando
Bye
(Switzerland) Gaudenz Coray
Bye
(Czech Republic) Jiri Tomanec
Bye
(Northern Ireland) Louis Doherty
Bye
(Russia) Andrei Podiosinskiy	4
(Latvia) Eglis Vitols	1
(Finland) Risto Sundgren
Bye
(Italy) Giuseppe Quintiero
Bye
(Scotland) Stephen Parkes
Bye
(Netherlands) Bert Vlaardingerbroek	4
(Greece) Tasos Miliotis	1

2nd Round (best of 7 legs)
(Wales) Richie Burnett	4
(Latvia) Uldis Erkis	2
(Finland) Seppo Uutela	4
(Denmark) Stig Jørgensen	1
(England) Ronnie Baxter	4
(France) Stephane Dalancon	0
(Scotland) Les Wallace	4
(Northern Ireland) Norman Beggs	1
(Netherlands) Raymond van Barneveld	4
(Sweden) Göran Klemme	0
(Belgium) Leo Laurens	4
(Italy) Giancarlo Scibetta	1
(Norway) Helge Knapskog	4
(Cyprus) George Trypiniotis	3
(Germany) Andree Welge	4
(Switzerland) Pierre Steiner	3
(Republic of Ireland) Des Byrne	4
(Russia) Dimitry Maslennikov	0
(Denmark) Per Skau	4
(Belgium) Stefan Eeckelaert	1
(Northern Ireland) Francis McMahon	4
(Switzerland) Noel Schlaeppi	3
(Netherlands) Braulio Roncero	4
(Greece) Paris Chloros	0
(England) Steve Beaton	4
(Cyprus) Demetris Georgiou	0
(Wales) Sean Palfrey	4
(France) Frederic Hogiun	3
(Scotland) Danny Cunningham	4
(Czech Republic) Albert Kolinsky	0
(Germany) Volker Backes	4
(Norway) Thor-Helmer Johansen	3
(Denmark) Jann Hoffmann	4
(England) Kevin Kenny	3
(Scotland) Bob Taylor	4
(Germany) Andreas Kröckel	1
(Wales) Eric Burden	4
(Greece) Stathis Pantelidis	0
(Norway) Øyvind Aasland	4
(Switzerland) Walter Tschudin	2
(Sweden) Jonas Bergström	4
(Russia) Oleg Ostashev	0
(Netherlands) Roland Scholten	4
(Republic of Ireland) Mick McGowan	0
(Belgium) Marcel De Vuyst	4
(Latvia) Alexander Gubin	0
(Finland) Ari Ilmanen	4
(France) Pascal Fontaine	1
(Denmark) Troels Rusel	4
(Republic of Ireland) Danial Maguire	0
(England) Martin Adams	4
(Belgium) Pascal Rabau	0
(Germany) Marcus Schulte	4
(Sweden) Nils-Gunnar Manshed	2
(Wales) Martin Phillips	4
(France) Serge Farrando	3
(Switzerland) Gaudenz Coray	4
(Czech Republic) Jiri Tomanec	0
(Northern Ireland) Louis Doherty	4
(Russia) Andrei Podiosinskiy	0
(Finland) Risto Sundgren	4
(Italy) Giuseppe Quintiero	1
(Scotland) Stephen Parkes	4
(Netherlands) Bert Vlaardingerbroek	2

3rd Round (best of 7 legs)
(Wales) Richie Burnett	4
(Finland) Seppo Uutela	0
(England) Ronnie Baxter	4
(Scotland) Les Wallace	1
(Netherlands) Raymond van Barneveld	4
(Belgium) Leo Laurens	3
(Norway) Helge Knapskog	1
(Germany) Andree Welge	4
(Republic of Ireland) Des Byrne	3
(Denmark) Per Skau	4
(Northern Ireland) Francis McMahon	2
(Netherlands) Braulio Roncero	4
(England) Steve Beaton	4
(Wales) Sean Palfrey	0
(Scotland) Danny Cunningham	4
(Germany) Volker Backes	1
(Denmark) Jann Hoffmann	3
(Scotland) Bob Taylor	4
(Wales) Eric Burden	3
(Norway) Øyvind Aasland	4
(Sweden) Jonas Bergström	1
(Netherlands) Roland Scholten	4
(Belgium) Marcel De Vuyst	4
(Finland) Ari Ilmanen	1
(Denmark) Troels Rusel	0
(England) Martin Adams	4
(Germany) Marcus Schulte	2
(Wales) Martin Phillips	4
(Switzerland) Gaudenz Coray	0
(Northern Ireland) Louis Doherty	4
(Finland) Risto Sundgren	1
(Scotland) Stephen Parkes	4

4th Round (best of 7 legs)
(Wales) Richie Burnett	2
(England) Ronnie Baxter	4
(Netherlands) Raymond van Barneveld	4
(Germany) Andree Welge	2
(Denmark) Per Skau	4
(Netherlands) Braulio Roncero	2
(England) Steve Beaton	4
(Scotland) Danny Cunningham	2
(Scotland) Bob Taylor	4
(Norway) Øyvind Aasland	0
(Netherlands) Roland Scholten	4
(Belgium) Marcel De Vuyst	2
(England) Martin Adams	4
(Wales) Martin Phillips	1
(Northern Ireland) Louis Doherty	2
(Scotland) Stephen Parkes	4

Quarter-finals (best of 7 legs)
(England) Ronnie Baxter	4
(Netherlands) Raymond van Barneveld	3
(Denmark) Per Skau	1
(England) Steve Beaton	4
(Scotland) Bob Taylor	4
(Netherlands) Roland Scholten	3
(England) Martin Adams	4
(Scotland) Stephen Parkes	0

Semi-finals (best of 7 legs)
(England) Ronnie Baxter	3
(England) Steve Beaton	4
Final (best of 7 legs)
(England) Steve Beaton	4
(England) Martin Adams	3
(Scotland) Bob Taylor	3
(England) Martin Adams	4

== Men's Pairs ==
1st Round (best of 7 legs)
(Finland) Ari Ilmanen (Finland) Seppo Uutela
Bye
(Germany) Andreas Kröckel (Germany) Volker Backes	3
(France) Stephane Dalancon (France) Frederic Hogiun	4
(Switzerland) Gaudenz Coray (Switzerland) Walter Tschudin
Bye
(England) Kevin Kenny (England) Martin Adams	4
(Gibraltar) George Federico (Gibraltar) Francis Taylor	0
(Netherlands) Roland Scholten (Netherlands) Raymond van Barneveld
Bye
(Belgium) Pascal Rabau (Belgium) Marcel De Vuyst	4
(Cyprus) Theo Nicodimou (Cyprus) George Trypiniotis	1
(Italy) Giorgio Sartor (Italy) Domenico Callegari
Bye
(Norway) Helge Knapskog (Norway) Thor-Helmer Johansen
Bye
(Wales) Eric Burden (Wales) Martin Phillips
Bye
(Sweden) Stefan Nagy (Sweden) Nils-Gunnar Manshed	4
(Russia) Dimitry Maslennikov (Russia) Dmitri Ostashev	2
(Greece) Stathis Pantelidis (Greece) Tasos Miliotis
Bye
(Northern Ireland) Norman Beggs (Northern Ireland) Charlie Gaile
Bye
(Denmark) Per Skau (Denmark) Troels Rusel
Bye
(Republic of Ireland) Des Byrne (Republic of Ireland) Brendan McDermott	4
(Latvia) Janis Straume (Latvia) Uldis Erkis	3
(Czech Republic) Jiri Tomanec (Czech Republic) Albert Kolinsky
Bye
(Scotland) Bob Taylor (Scotland) Stephen Parkes
Bye
(Scotland) Les Wallace (Scotland) Danny Cunningham
Bye
(Denmark) Jann Hoffmann (Denmark) Stig Jørgensen	4
(Greece) Dionissis Pilichos (Greece) Paris Chloros	3
(Cyprus) Costas Constantinou (Cyprus) Demetris Georgiou
Bye
(Wales) Sean Palfrey (Wales) Richie Burnett
(Gibraltar) Michael Robinson (Gibraltar) Leslie Ward
(Sweden) Göran Klemme (Sweden) Jonas Bergström
Bye
(Norway) Øyvind Aasland (Norway) Arild Folgerø	4
(Czech Republic) Tony Kamernicky (Czech Republic) Blaine Karst	0
(France) Pascal Fontaine (France) Serge Farrando
Bye
(Belgium) Stefan Eeckelaert (Belgium) Leo Laurens
Bye
(England) Steve Beaton (England) Ronnie Baxter
Bye
(Netherlands) Braulio Roncero (Netherlands) Bert Vlaardingerbroek	1
(Switzerland) Pierre Steiner (Switzerland) Noel Schlaeppi	4
(Russia) Oleg Ostashev (Russia) Andrei Podiosinskiy
Bye
(Germany) Markus Schulte (Germany) Andree Welge
Bye
(Republic of Ireland) Mick McGowan (Republic of Ireland) Danial Maguire
Bye
(Northern Ireland) Louis Doherty (Northern Ireland) Francis McMahon	4
(Italy) Giancarlo Scibetta (Italy) Giuseppe Quintiero	1
(Latvia) Alexander Gubin (Latvia) Eglis Vitols
Bye
(Finland) Risto Sundgren (Finland) Heikki Hermunen
Bye

2nd Round (best of 7 legs)
(Finland) Ari Ilmanen (Finland) Seppo Uutela	2
(France) Stephane Dalancon (France) Frederic Hogiun	4
(Switzerland) Gaudenz Coray (Switzerland) Walter Tschudin	1
(England) Kevin Kenny (England) Martin Adams	4
(Netherlands) Roland Scholten (Netherlands) Raymond van Barneveld	4
(Belgium) Pascal Rabau (Belgium) Marcel De Vuyst	1
(Italy) Giorgio Sartor (Italy) Domenico Callegari	4
(Norway) Helge Knapskog (Norway) Thor-Helmer Johansen	3
(Wales) Eric Burden (Wales) Martin Phillips	4
(Sweden) Stefan Nagy (Sweden) Nils-Gunnar Manshed	1
(Greece) Stathis Pantelidis (Greece) Tasos Miliotis	1
(Northern Ireland) Norman Beggs (Northern Ireland) Charlie Gaile	4
(Denmark) Per Skau (Denmark) Troels Rusel	4
(Republic of Ireland) Des Byrne (Republic of Ireland) Brendan McDermott	2
(Czech Republic) Jiri Tomanec (Czech Republic) Albert Kolinsky	0
(Scotland) Bob Taylor (Scotland) Stephen Parkes	4
(Scotland) Les Wallace (Scotland) Danny Cunningham	1
(Denmark) Jann Hoffmann (Denmark) Stig Jørgensen	4
(Cyprus) Costas Constantinou (Cyprus) Demetris Georgiou	0
(Wales) Sean Palfrey (Wales) Richie Burnett	4
(Sweden) Göran Klemme (Sweden) Jonas Bergström	4
(Norway) Øyvind Aasland (Norway) Arild Folgerø	2
(France) Pascal Fontaine (France) Serge Farrando	3
(Belgium) Stefan Eeckelaert (Belgium) Leo Laurens	4
(England) Steve Beaton (England) Ronnie Baxter	4
(Switzerland) Pierre Steiner (Switzerland) Noel Schlaeppi	2
(Russia) Oleg Ostashev (Russia) Andrei Podiosinskiy	0
(Germany) Markus Schulte (Germany) Andree Welge	4
(Republic of Ireland) Mick McGowan (Republic of Ireland) Danial Maguire	2
(Northern Ireland) Louis Doherty (Northern Ireland) Francis McMahon	4
(Latvia) Alexander Gubin (Latvia) Eglis Vitols	1
(Finland) Risto Sundgren (Finland) Heikki Hermunen	4

3rd Round (best of 7 legs)
(France) Stephane Dalancon (France) Frederic Hogiun	0
(England) Kevin Kenny (England) Martin Adams	4
(Netherlands) Roland Scholten (Netherlands) Raymond van Barneveld	4
(Italy) Giorgio Sartor (Italy) Domenico Callegari	1
(Wales) Eric Burden (Wales) Martin Phillips	4
(Northern Ireland) Norman Beggs (Northern Ireland) Charlie Gaile	3
(Denmark) Per Skau (Denmark) Troels Rusel	2
(Scotland) Bob Taylor (Scotland) Stephen Parkes	4
(Denmark) Jann Hoffmann (Denmark) Stig Jørgensen	2
(Wales) Sean Palfrey (Wales) Richie Burnett	4
(Sweden) Göran Klemme (Sweden) Jonas Bergström	1
(Belgium) Stefan Eeckelaert (Belgium) Leo Laurens	4
(England) Steve Beaton (England) Ronnie Baxter	4
(Germany) Markus Schulte (Germany) Andree Welge	1
(Northern Ireland) Louis Doherty (Northern Ireland) Francis McMahon	2
(Finland) Risto Sundgren (Finland) Heikki Hermunen	4

Quarter-finals (best of 7 legs)
(England) Kevin Kenny (England) Martin Adams	1
(Netherlands) Roland Scholten (Netherlands) Raymond van Barneveld	4
(Wales) Eric Burden (Wales) Martin Phillips	4
(Scotland) Bob Taylor (Scotland) Stephen Parkes	2
(Wales) Sean Palfrey (Wales) Richie Burnett	4
(Belgium) Stefan Eeckelaert (Belgium) Leo Laurens	1
(England) Steve Beaton (England) Ronnie Baxter	4
(Finland) Risto Sundgren (Finland) Heikki Hermunen	3

Semi-finals (best of 7 legs)
(Netherlands) Roland Scholten (Netherlands) Raymond van Barneveld	1
(Wales) Eric Burden (Wales) Martin Phillips	4
(Wales) Sean Palfrey (Wales) Richie Burnett	4
(England) Steve Beaton (England) Ronnie Baxter	1

Final (best of 7 legs)
(Wales) Eric Burden (Wales) Martin Phillips	4
(Wales) Sean Palfrey (Wales) Richie Burnett	3

== Men's team ==
Round Robin

Group A

Pos	Team	Pld	Win	Lose	LF	LA	+/-
1	England	4	4	0	36	11	+25
2	Norway	4	3	1	33	18	+15
3	Switzerland	4	2	2	28	26	+2
4	Cyprus	4	1	3	14	35	-21
5	Czech Republic	4	0	4	15	36	-21

- England 9 - 6 Norway
- England 9 - 3 Switzerland
- England 9 - 1 Cyprus
- England 9 - 1 Czech Republic
- Norway 9 - 7 Switzerland
- Norway 9 - 2 Cyprus
- Norway 9 - 0 Czech Republic
- Switzerland 9 - 2 Cyprus
- Switzerland 9 - 6 Czech Republic
- Cyprus 9 - 8 Czech Republic

Group B

Pos	Team	Pld	Win	Lose	LF	LA	+/-
1	Northern Ireland	4	4	0	36	10	+26
2	Scotland	4	3	1	34	15	+19
3	France	4	2	2	24	20	+4
4	Greece	4	1	3	12	32	-20
5	Latvia	4	0	4	7	36	-29

- Northern Ireland 9 - 7 Scotland
- Northern Ireland 9 - 2 France
- Northern Ireland 9 - 0 Greece
- Northern Ireland 9 - 1 Latvia
- Scotland 9 - 4 France
- Scotland 9 - 2 Greece
- Scotland 9 - 0 Latvia
- France 9 - 2 Greece
- France 9 - 1 Latvia
- Greece 9 - 5 Latvia

Group C

Pos	Team	Pld	Win	Lose	LF	LA	+/-
1	Wales	4	4	0	36	10	+26
2	Belgium	4	3	1	33	22	+11
3	Sweden	4	2	2	30	28	+2
4	Italy	4	1	3	14	30	-16
5	Russia	4	0	4	13	36	-23

- Wales 9 - 6 Belgium
- Wales 9 - 4 Sweden
- Wales 9 - 0 Italy
- Wales 9 - 0 Russia
- Belgium 9 - 8 Sweden
- Belgium 9 - 2 Italy
- Belgium 9 - 3 Russia
- Sweden 9 - 3 Italy
- Sweden 9 - 7 Russia
- Italy 9 - 3 Russia

Group D

Pos	Team	Pld	Win	Lose	LF	LA	+/-
1	Netherlands	4	3	1	35	22	+13
2	Denmark	4	3	1	34	26	+8
3	(Republic of Ireland) Ireland	4	2	2	23	29	-6
4	Finland	4	1	3	30	30	0
5	Germany	4	1	3	20	35	-20

- Netherlands 9 - 2 (Republic of Ireland) Ireland
- Netherlands 9 - 8 Finland
- Netherlands 9 - 3 Germany
- Denmark 9 - 8 Netherlands
- Denmark 9 - 5 Finland
- Denmark 9 - 4 Germany
- (Republic of Ireland) Ireland 9 - 7 Denmark
- (Republic of Ireland) Ireland 9 - 4 Germany
- Finland 9 - 3 (Republic of Ireland) Ireland
- Germany 9 - 8 Finland

Knock Out

Quarter-finals (best of 17 legs)
A1	England	9
D2	Netherlands	5
B1	Northern Ireland	8
C2	Belgium	9
C1	Wales	9
B2	Norway	6
D1	Denmark	4
A2	Scotland	9

Semi-finals (best of 17 legs)
A1	England	9
C2	Belgium	1
C1	Wales	9
A2	Scotland	7

Final (best of 17 legs)
A1	England	9
C1	Wales	7

== Woman's singles ==
1st Round (best of 7 legs)
(Finland) Eila Nikander	4
(Latvia) Nadedja Boltatch	0
(England) Tammy Montgomery
Bye
(Wales) Sandra Greatbatch
Bye
(Northern Ireland) Norma Irvine
Bye
(Sweden) Kristina Korpii
Bye
(France) Josiane Lefebre
Bye
(Scotland) Janette Youngson
Bye
(Russia) Marina Tsariova
Bye
(Germany) Gaby Kosuch
Bye
(Norway) Mette Engen-Hansen	4
(Czech Republic) Kveta Drahuska	1
(Netherlands) Francis Hoenselaar
Bye
(Italy) Monica Zago
Bye
(Republic of Ireland) Maureen Owens
Bye
(Switzerland) Barbara Pfister
Bye
(Denmark) Ann-Louise Peters
Bye
(Greece) Yiota Kouranou
Bye
(Denmark) Gerda Søgaard-Weltz
Bye
(Republic of Ireland) Sharon Rafter	4
(France) Sophie Flieler	2
(Germany) Heike Ernst
Bye
(Scotland) Cathie Gibson-McCulloch
Bye
(Switzerland) Andrea Tanner
Bye
(Sweden) Ewa Berg
Bye
(Northern Ireland) Rhonda Henry
Bye
(Latvia) Galina Gubina
Bye
(Russia) Maria Novikova	4
(Greece) Xeni Koutika	1
(Wales) Leeanne Maddock
Bye
(Netherlands) Valerie Maytum
Bye
(Finland) Paivi Jussila
Bye
(Norway) Karin Nordahl
Bye
(Czech Republic) Eva Hrinova
Bye
(England) Deta Hedman
Bye
(Italy) Nadia Moschion
Bye

2nd Round (best of 7 legs)
(Finland) Eila Nikander	4
(England) Tammy Montgomery	2
(Wales) Sandra Greatbatch	4
(Northern Ireland) Norma Irvine	1
(Sweden) Kristina Korpii	4
(France) Josiane Lefebre	2
(Scotland) Janette Youngson	4
(Russia) Marina Tsariova	1
(Germany) Gaby Kosuch	4
(Norway) Mette Engen-Hansen	2
(Netherlands) Francis Hoenselaar	4
(Italy) Monica Zago	1
(Republic of Ireland) Maureen Owens	4
(Switzerland) Barbara Pfister	2
(Denmark) Ann-Louise Peters	4
(Greece) Yiota Kouranou	1
(Denmark) Gerda Søgaard-Weltz	4
(Republic of Ireland) Sharon Rafter	2
(Germany) Heike Ernst	4
(Scotland) Cathie Gibson-McCulloch	2
(Switzerland) Andrea Tanner	4
(Sweden) Ewa Berg	1
(Northern Ireland) Rhonda Henry	4
(Latvia) Galina Gubina	0
(Russia) Maria Novikova	4
(Wales) Leeanne Maddock	3
(Netherlands) Valerie Maytum	4
(Finland) Paivi Jussila	2
(Norway) Karin Nordahl	4
(Czech Republic) Eva Hrinova	0
(England) Deta Hedman	4
(Italy) Nadia Moschion	0

3rd Round (best of 7 legs)
(Finland) Eila Nikander	0
(Wales) Sandra Greatbatch	4
(Sweden) Kristina Korpii	1
(Scotland) Janette Youngson	4
(Germany) Gaby Kosuch	3
(Netherlands) Francis Hoenselaar	4
(Republic of Ireland) Maureen Owens	2
(Denmark) Ann-Louise Peters	4
(Denmark) Gerda Søgaard-Weltz	1
(Germany) Heike Ernst	4
(Switzerland) Andrea Tanner	3
(Northern Ireland) Rhonda Henry	4
(Russia) Maria Novikova	3
(Netherlands) Valerie Maytum	4
(Norway) Karin Nordahl	1
(England) Deta Hedman	4

Quarter-finals (best of 7 legs)
(Wales) Sandra Greatbatch	4
(Scotland) Janette Youngson	3
(Netherlands) Francis Hoenselaar	4
(Denmark) Ann-Louise Peters	3
(Germany) Heike Ernst	4
(Northern Ireland) Rhonda Henry	0
(Netherlands) Valerie Maytum	3
(England) Deta Hedman	4

Semi-finals (best of 7 legs)
(Wales) Sandra Greatbatch	3
(Netherlands) Francis Hoenselaar	4
(Germany) Heike Ernst	1
(England) Deta Hedman	4

Final (best of 7 legs)
(Netherlands) Francis Hoenselaar	2
(England) Deta Hedman	4

== Woman's Pairs ==
Round Robin

Group A

Pos	Team	Pld	Win	Lose	LF	LA	+/-
1	(Wales) Leeanne Maddock (Wales) Sandra Greatbatch	3	3	0	12	3	+9
2	(Scotland) Cathie Gibson-McCulloch (Scotland) Janette Youngson	3	2	1	10	6	+4
3	(Italy) Monica Zago (Italy) Nadia Moschion	3	1	2	6	9	-3
4	(Latvia) Nadedja Boltatch (Latvia) Galina Gubina	3	0	3	2	12	-10

- (Wales) Leeanne Maddock & Sandra Greatbatch 4 - 2 (Scotland) Cathie Gibson-McCulloch & Janette Youngson
- (Wales) Leeanne Maddock & Sandra Greatbatch 4 - 1 (Italy) Monica Zago & Nadia Moschion
- (Wales) Leeanne Maddock & Sandra Greatbatch 4 - 0 (Latvia) Nadedja Boltatch & Galina Gubina
- (Scotland) Cathie Gibson-McCulloch & Janette Youngson 4 - 1 (Italy) Monica Zago & Nadia Moschion
- (Scotland) Cathie Gibson-McCulloch & Janette Youngson 4 - 1 (Latvia) Nadedja Boltatch & Galina Gubina
- (Italy) Monica Zago & Nadia Moschion 4 - 1 (Latvia) Nadedja Boltatch & Galina Gubina

Group B

Pos	Team	Pld	Win	Lose	LF	LA	+/-
1	(Netherlands) Valerie Maytum (Netherlands) Francis Hoenselaar	3	3	0	12	2	+10
2	(Denmark) Gerda Søgaard-Weltz (Denmark) Ann-Louise Peters	3	2	1	10	5	+5
3	(Switzerland) Andrea Tanner (Switzerland) Barbara Pfister	3	1	2	5	9	-4
4	(Russia) Maria Novikova (Russia) Marina Tsariova	3	0	3	1	12	-11

- (Netherlands) Valerie Maytum & Francis Hoenselaar 4 - 2 (Denmark) Gerda Søgaard-Weltz & Ann-Louise Peters
- (Netherlands) Valerie Maytum & Francis Hoenselaar 4 - 0 (Switzerland) Andrea Tanner & Barbara Pfister
- (Netherlands) Valerie Maytum & Francis Hoenselaar 4 - 0 (Russia) Maria Novikova & Marina Tsariova
- (Denmark) Gerda Søgaard-Weltz & Ann-Louise Peters 4 - 1 (Switzerland) Andrea Tanner & Barbara Pfister
- (Denmark) Gerda Søgaard-Weltz & Ann-Louise Peters 4 - 0 (Russia) Maria Novikova & Marina Tsariova
- (Switzerland) Andrea Tanner & Barbara Pfister 4 - 1 (Russia) Maria Novikova & Marina Tsariova

Group C

Pos	Team	Pld	Win	Lose	LF	LA	+/-
1	(Germany) Heike Ernst (Germany) Gaby Kosuch	4	4	0	16	8	+8
2	(Sweden) Ewa Berg (Sweden) Kristina Korpii	4	3	1	14	8	+6
3	(Norway) Karin Nordahl (Norway) Mette Engen-Hansen	4	1	3	13	13	0
4	(Northern Ireland) Rhonda Henry (Northern Ireland) Norma Irvine	4	1	3	7	13	-6
5	(France) Josiane Lefebre (France) Sophie Flieler	4	1	3	7	15	-8

- (Germany) Heike Ernst & Gaby Kosuch 4 - 2 (Sweden) Ewa Berg & Kristina Korpii
- (Germany) Heike Ernst & Gaby Kosuch 4 - 3 (Norway) Karin Nordahl & Mette Engen-Hansen
- (Germany) Heike Ernst & Gaby Kosuch 4 - 2 (Northern Ireland) Rhonda Henry & Norma Irvine
- (Germany) Heike Ernst & Gaby Kosuch 4 - 1 (France) Josiane Lefebre & Sophie Flieler
- (Sweden) Ewa Berg & Kristina Korpii 4 - 3 (Norway) Karin Nordahl & Mette Engen-Hansen
- (Sweden) Ewa Berg & Kristina Korpii 4 - 0 (Northern Ireland) Rhonda Henry & Norma Irvine
- (Sweden) Ewa Berg & Kristina Korpii 4 - 1 (France) Josiane Lefebre & Sophie Flieler
- (Norway) Karin Nordahl & Mette Engen-Hansen 4 - 1 (Northern Ireland) Rhonda Henry & Norma Irvine
- (Northern Ireland) Rhonda Henry & Norma Irvine 4 - 1 (France) Josiane Lefebre & Sophie Flieler
- (France) Josiane Lefebre & Sophie Flieler 4 - 3 (Norway) Karin Nordahl & Mette Engen-Hansen

Group D

Pos	Team	Pld	Win	Lose	LF	LA	+/-
1	(England) Tammy Montgomery (England) Deta Hedman	4	4	0	16	3	+13
2	(Finland) Eila Nikander (Finland) Paivi Jussila	4	3	1	14	4	+10
3	(Republic of Ireland) Maureen Owens (Republic of Ireland) Sharon Rafter	4	2	2	9	10	-1
4	(Greece) Xeni Koutika (Greece) Yiota Kouranou	4	1	3	5	14	-9
5	(Czech Republic) Kveta Drahuska (Czech Republic) Eva Hrinova	4	0	4	3	16	-13

- (England) Tammy Montgomery & Deta Hedman 4 - 2 (Finland) Eila Nikander & Paivi Jussila
- (England) Tammy Montgomery & Deta Hedman 4 - 1 (Republic of Ireland) Maureen Owens & Sharon Rafter
- (England) Tammy Montgomery & Deta Hedman 4 - 0 (Greece) Xeni Koutika & Yiota Kouranou
- (England) Tammy Montgomery & Deta Hedman 4 - 0 (Czech Republic) Kveta Drahuska & Eva Hrinova
- (Finland) Eila Nikander & Paivi Jussila 4 - 0 (Republic of Ireland) Maureen Owens & Sharon Rafter
- (Finland) Eila Nikander & Paivi Jussila 4 - 0 (Greece) Xeni Koutika & Yiota Kouranou
- (Finland) Eila Nikander & Paivi Jussila 4 - 0 (Czech Republic) Kveta Drahuska & Eva Hrinova
- (Republic of Ireland) Maureen Owens & Sharon Rafter 4 - 1 (Greece) Xeni Koutika & Yiota Kouranou
- (Republic of Ireland) Maureen Owens & Sharon Rafter 4 - 1 (Czech Republic) Kveta Drahuska & Eva Hrinova
- (Greece) Xeni Koutika & Yiota Kouranou 4 - 2 (Czech Republic) Kveta Drahuska & Eva Hrinova

Knock Out

Quarter-finals (best of 7 legs)
A1	(Wales) Leeanne Maddock (Wales) Sandra Greatbatch	4
D2	(Finland) Eila Nikander (Finland) Paivi Jussila	2
B1	(Netherlands) Valerie Maytum (Netherlands) Francis Hoenselaar	4
C2	(Sweden) Ewa Berg (Sweden) Kristina Korpii	2
C1	(Germany) Heike Ernst (Germany) Gaby Kosuch	3
A2	(Scotland) Cathie Gibson-McCulloch (Scotland) Janette Youngson	4
D1	(England) Tammy Montgomery (England) Deta Hedman	4
B2	(Denmark) Gerda Søgaard-Weltz (Denmark) Ann-Louise Peters	0

Semi-finals (best of 7 legs)
D2	(Wales) Leeanne Maddock (Wales) Sandra Greatbatch	2
B1	(Netherlands) Valerie Maytum (Netherlands) Francis Hoenselaar	4
A2	(Scotland) Cathie Gibson-McCulloch (Scotland) Janette Youngson	3
D1	(England) Tammy Montgomery (England) Deta Hedman	4

Final (best of 7 legs)
B1	(Netherlands) Valerie Maytum (Netherlands) Francis Hoenselaar	2
D1	(England) Tammy Montgomery (England) Deta Hedman	4
