= WDF World Cup =

Biennial darts tournament

Tournament information
- Venue: Various
- Location: Various
- Established: 1977
- Organisation(s): WDF Category Major
- Format: Legs
- Month(s) Played: September/October

Current champion(s)
- Singles (Austria) Franko Giuliani (men's singles) (Philippines) Lovely-Mae Orbeta (women's singles) (Canada) Peyton Hammond (boys' singles) (Turkey) Ayşegül Karagöz (girls' singles); Pairs (Italy) Alex Bassetti & Daniele Petri (men's pairs); Kosuzu Iwao & Shiori Sato (women's pairs) (Republic of Ireland) Aidan O'Hara & Jack Courtney (boys' pairs) (Chinese Taipei) Tsai Yung-En & Yang Yi-Ching (girls' pairs) (Netherlands) Kendji Steinbach & Kimberly Kersbergen (youth mixed); Team; Wales (men's team); Ireland (women's team); Overall; Japan (men's overall); Ireland (women's overall); Netherlands (youth overall)

The WDF World Cup is a darts tournament organised by the World Darts Federation and held biennially since 1977. It has featured men's events since the beginning, while women's events were added in 1983 and youth events in 1999. The most recent tournament, the 2025 World Cup, was held in Seoul, South Korea. The event used to be broadcast on ITV in the United Kingdom, but coverage of the tournament ceased after the 1987 World Cup.

== Tournament structure ==
Men's national teams participating in the WDF World Cup consist of four players per country, competing as singles, pairs and in a four-player team event. Starting in 2015, women's teams will also consist of four players each and compete in these three types of events, having previously comprised only two players for singles and pairs competitions. Youth teams have been expanded as well and will now include two male and two female players under the age of 18 who compete in their respective singles and pairs competitions as well as a mixed pairs event.

Points are scored depending on placement in the various events, with the national teams achieving the highest points totals being crowned WDF World Cup Champions in the three categories of men, women and youth.

== List of tournaments ==
Year	Venue	Men's World Cup		Women's World Cup		Youth World Cup	
1977	(England) London	Overall	Wales				
1977	(England) London	Singles	(Wales) Leighton Rees				
1977	(England) London	Pairs	(England) Eric Bristow & John Lowe				
1977	(England) London	Team	(Wales) Leighton Rees, Alan Evans, David Jones, Phil Obbard				
1979	(United States) Las Vegas	Overall	England				
1979	(United States) Las Vegas	Singles	(United States) Nicky Virachkul				
1979	(United States) Las Vegas	Pairs	(England) Eric Bristow & John Lowe				
1979	(United States) Las Vegas	Team	(England) Eric Bristow, John Lowe, Tony Brown, Bill Lennard				
1981	(New Zealand) Nelson	Overall	England				
1981	(New Zealand) Nelson	Singles	(England) John Lowe				
1981	(New Zealand) Nelson	Pairs	(England) Cliff Lazarenko & Tony Brown				
1981	(New Zealand) Nelson	Team	(England) Eric Bristow, John Lowe, Tony Brown, Cliff Lazarenko				
1983	(Scotland) Edinburgh	Overall	England	Overall	England		
1983	(Scotland) Edinburgh	Singles	(England) Eric Bristow	Singles	(United States) Sandy Reitan		
1983	(Scotland) Edinburgh	Pairs	(England) Eric Bristow & John Lowe	Pairs	(England) Maureen Flowers & Audrey Derham		
1983	(Scotland) Edinburgh	Team	(England) Eric Bristow, John Lowe, Keith Deller, Dave Whitcombe	Team	Not Held		
1985	(Australia) Brisbane	Overall	England	Overall	England		
1985	(Australia) Brisbane	Singles	(England) Eric Bristow	Singles	(England) Linda Batten		
1985	(Australia) Brisbane	Pairs	(England) Eric Bristow & John Lowe	Pairs	(England) Linda Batten & Sharon Kemp		
1985	(Australia) Brisbane	Team	(United States) Tony Payne, Rick Ney, John Kramer, Dan Valletto	Team	Not Held		
1987	(Denmark) Copenhagen	Overall	England	Overall	United States		
1987	(Denmark) Copenhagen	Singles	(England) Eric Bristow	Singles	(Netherlands) Valery Maytum		
1987	(Denmark) Copenhagen	Pairs	(England) Eric Bristow & John Lowe	Pairs	(United States) Kathy Karpowich & Kathy Maloney		
1987	(Denmark) Copenhagen	Team	(England) Eric Bristow, John Lowe, Cliff Lazarenko, Bob Anderson	Team	Not Held		
1989	(Canada) Toronto	Overall	England	Overall	England		
1989	(Canada) Toronto	Singles	(England) Eric Bristow	Singles	(United States) Eva Grigsby		
1989	(Canada) Toronto	Pairs	(England) Eric Bristow & John Lowe	Pairs	(England) Sharon Colclough & Sue Edwards		
1989	(Canada) Toronto	Team	(Canada) Bob Sinnaeve, Rick Bisaro, Tony Holyoake, Albert Anstey	Team	Not Held		
1991	(Netherlands) Zandvoort	Overall	England	Overall	New Zealand		
1991	(Netherlands) Zandvoort	Singles	(England) John Lowe	Singles	(New Zealand) Jill MacDonald		
1991	(Netherlands) Zandvoort	Pairs	(Australia) Keith Sullivan & Wayne Weening	Pairs	(Wales) Sandra Greatbatch & Rhian Speed		
1991	(Netherlands) Zandvoort	Team	(England) Eric Bristow, John Lowe, Phil Taylor, Alan Warriner	Team	Not Held		
1993	(United States) Las Vegas	Overall	Wales	Overall	United States		
1993	(United States) Las Vegas	Singles	(Netherlands) Roland Scholten	Singles	(United States) Kathy Maloney		
1993	(United States) Las Vegas	Pairs	(Canada) John Part & Carl Mercer	Pairs	(Netherlands) Valery Maytum & Francis Hoenselaar		
1993	(United States) Las Vegas	Team	(England) Steve Beaton, Ronnie Baxter, Kevin Kenny, Dave Askew	Team	Not Held		
1995	(Switzerland) Basel	Overall	England	Overall	England		
1995	(Switzerland) Basel	Singles	(England) Martin Adams	Singles	(England) Mandy Solomons		
1995	(Switzerland) Basel	Pairs	(England) Martin Adams & Andy Fordham	Pairs	(England) Deta Hedman & Mandy Solomons		
1995	(Switzerland) Basel	Team	(England) Steve Beaton, Ronnie Baxter, Martin Adams, Andy Fordham	Team	Not Held		
1997	(Australia) Perth	Overall	Wales	Overall	United States		
1997	(Australia) Perth	Singles	(Netherlands) Raymond van Barneveld	Singles	(New Zealand) Noeline Gear		
1997	(Australia) Perth	Pairs	(Wales) Sean Palfrey & Martin Phillips	Pairs	(United States) Stacy Bromberg & Lori Verrier		
1997	(Australia) Perth	Team	(Wales) Eric Burden, Marshall James, Sean Palfrey, Martin Phillips	Team	Not Held		
1999	(South Africa) Durban	Overall	England	Overall	England	Overall	Australia
1999	(South Africa) Durban	Singles	(Netherlands) Raymond van Barneveld	Singles	(England) Trina Gulliver	Boys	(Finland) Kim Viljanen
1999	(South Africa) Durban	Pairs	(Wales) Ritchie Davies & Richie Herbert	Pairs	(England) Trina Gulliver & Apylee Jones	Girls	(Australia) Harrena Williamson
1999	(South Africa) Durban	Team	(England) Ronnie Baxter, Martin Adams, Andy Fordham, Mervyn King	Team	Not Held	Mixed	(Australia) Beau Anderson & Harrena Williamson
2001	(Malaysia) Kuala Lumpur	Overall	England	Overall	Netherlands	Overall	Sweden
2001	(Malaysia) Kuala Lumpur	Singles	(England) Martin Adams	Singles	(Netherlands) Francis Hoenselaar	Boys	(England) Stephen Bunting
2001	(Malaysia) Kuala Lumpur	Pairs	(England) Andy Fordham & John Walton	Pairs	(Netherlands) Francis Hoenselaar & Mieke de Boer	Girls	(Australia) Venus Johnson
2001	(Malaysia) Kuala Lumpur	Team	(England) Martin Adams, Andy Fordham, Mervyn King, John Walton	Team	Not Held	Mixed	(Sweden) Markus Korhonen & Johanna Ehn
2003	(France) Epinal	Overall	England	Overall	England	Overall	Australia
2003	(France) Epinal	Singles	(Netherlands) Raymond van Barneveld	Singles	(England) Trina Gulliver	Boys	(Netherlands) Jerry Hendriks
2003	(France) Epinal	Pairs	(England) Martin Adams & Mervyn King	Pairs	(England) Trina Gulliver & Clare Bywaters	Girls	(England) Kate Dando
2003	(France) Epinal	Team	(United States) Ray Carver, John Kuczynski, Bill Davis, George Walls	Team	Not Held	Mixed	(Australia) Kyle Anderson & Kathleen Logue
2005	(Australia) Perth	Overall	Netherlands	Overall	England	Overall	Netherlands
2005	(Australia) Perth	Singles	(Netherlands) Dick van Dijk	Singles	(England) Clare Bywaters	Boys	(Netherlands) Jonny Nijs
2005	(Australia) Perth	Pairs	(Netherlands) Raymond van Barneveld & Vincent van der Voort	Pairs	(England) Trina Gulliver & Clare Bywaters	Girls	(Netherlands) Carla Molema
2005	(Australia) Perth	Team	(Finland) Jarkko Komula, Ulf Ceder, Marko Pusa, Kim Viljanen	Team	Not Held	Mixed	(Netherlands) Jonny Nijs & Carla Molema
2007	(Netherlands) Rosmalen	Overall	Netherlands	Overall	Wales	Overall	Netherlands
2007	(Netherlands) Rosmalen	Singles	(Wales) Mark Webster	Singles	(Wales) Jan Robbins	Boys	(Hungary) Tibor Tax
2007	(Netherlands) Rosmalen	Pairs	(Netherlands) Mario Robbe & Joey ten Berge	Pairs	(Russia) Anastasia Dobromyslova & Irina Armstrong	Girls	(Sweden) Linda Odén
2007	(Netherlands) Rosmalen	Team	(England) Martin Adams, Steve Farmer, Tony O'Shea, John Walton	Team	Not Held	Mixed	(Netherlands) Maarten Pape & Thea Kaaijk
2009	(United States) Charlotte	Overall	Netherlands	Overall	England	Overall	Finland
2009	(United States) Charlotte	Singles	(England) Tony O'Shea	Singles	(United States) Stacy Bromberg	Boys	(Wales) Jamie Lewis
2009	(United States) Charlotte	Pairs	(Australia) Anthony Fleet & Geoff Kime	Pairs	(England) Lisa Ashton & Karen Lawman	Girls	(Finland) Aliisa Koskivirta
2009	(United States) Charlotte	Team	(Netherlands) Joey ten Berge, Willy van de Wiel, Frans Harmsen, Daniel Brouwer	Team	Not Held	Mixed	(Finland) Tuomas Tikka & Aliisa Koskivirta
2011	(Republic of Ireland) Castlebar	Overall	England	Overall	England	Overall	England
2011	(Republic of Ireland) Castlebar	Singles	(England) Scott Waites	Singles	(England) Trina Gulliver	Boys	(Netherlands) Jimmy Hendriks
2011	(Republic of Ireland) Castlebar	Pairs	(England) Martin Adams & Tony O'Shea	Pairs	(England) Trina Gulliver & Deta Hedman	Girls	(England) Fallon Sherrock
2011	(Republic of Ireland) Castlebar	Team	(England) Scott Waites, Tony O'Shea, Martin Atkins, Martin Adams	Team	Not Held	Mixed	(England) Jake Jones & Fallon Sherrock
2013	(Canada) St. John's	Overall	England	Overall	England	Overall	Australia
2013	(Canada) St. John's	Singles	(Netherlands) Wesley Harms	Singles	(England) Deta Hedman	Boys	(Australia) Jamie Rundle
2013	(Canada) St. John's	Pairs	(England) Stephen Bunting & Tony O'Shea	Pairs	(England) Trina Gulliver & Deta Hedman	Girls	(England) Casey Gallagher
2013	(Canada) St. John's	Team	(Scotland) Ross Montgomery, Craig Baxter, Gary Stone, Alan Soutar	Team	Not Held	Mixed	(Canada) Dawson Murschell & Alicia Looker
2015	(Turkey) Antalya	Overall	England	Overall	England	Overall	Netherlands
2015	(Turkey) Antalya	Singles	(Wales) Jim Williams	Singles	(England) Lisa Ashton	Boys Singles	(Netherlands) Maikel Verberk
2015	(Turkey) Antalya	Pairs	(Netherlands) Wesley Harms & Richard Veenstra	Pairs	(England) Lisa Ashton & Claire Brookin	Boys Pairs	(Netherlands) Maikel Verberk & Justin van Tergouw
2015	(Turkey) Antalya	Team	(England) Glen Durrant, Scott Mitchell, Jamie Hughes, Mark McGeeney	Team	(England) Deta Hedman, Lisa Ashton, Fallon Sherrock, Claire Brookin	Girls Singles	(South Africa) Tayla Carolissen
2015	(Turkey) Antalya					Girls Pairs	(Germany) Christina Schuler & Nina Puls
2015	(Turkey) Antalya					Mixed	(Netherlands) Maikel Verberk & Kyana Frauenfelder
2017	(Japan) Kobe	Overall	Australia	Overall	Netherlands	Overall	Netherlands
2017	(Japan) Kobe	Singles	(Canada) Jeff Smith	Singles	(Sweden) Vicky Pruim	Boys Singles	(Netherlands) Justin van Tergouw
2017	(Japan) Kobe	Pairs	(Russia) Boris Koltsov & Aleksandr Oreshkin	Pairs	(Russia) Anastasia Dobromyslova & Marina Kononova	Boys Pairs	(Netherlands) Justin van Tergouw & Wessel Nijman
2017	(Japan) Kobe	Team	(Australia) Peter Machin, Justin Thompson, Andrew Townes, Raymond Smith	Team	(Netherlands) Aileen de Graaf, Sharon Prins, Anca Zijlstra, Vanessa Zuidema	Girls Singles	(Iran) Deniz Hashtbaran
2017	(Japan) Kobe					Girls Pairs	(Iran) Deniz Hashtbaran & Mahshad Avazzadeh
2017	(Japan) Kobe					Mixed	(Netherlands) Justin van Tergouw & Layla Brussel
2019	(Romania) Cluj-Napoca	Overall	Netherlands	Overall	England	Overall	England
2019	(Romania) Cluj-Napoca	Singles	(New Zealand) Darren Herewini	Singles	(Japan) Mikuru Suzuki	Boys Singles	(England) Keelan Kay
2019	(Romania) Cluj-Napoca	Pairs	(Canada) David Cameron & Jeff Smith	Pairs	(Japan) Mikuru Suzuki & Mayumi Ouchi	Boys Pairs	(England) Brad Phillips and Keelan Kay
2019	(Romania) Cluj-Napoca	Team	(Wales) Jim Williams, Darren Bingham, Arwyn Morris, Nick Kenny	Team	(England) Maria O'Brien, Lorraine Winstanley, Deta Hedman, Fallon Sherrock	Girls Singles	(England) Beau Greaves
2019	(Romania) Cluj-Napoca					Girls Pairs	(England) Beau Greaves and Shannon Reeves
2019	(Romania) Cluj-Napoca					Mixed	(Czech Republic) Tomas Houdek and Anna Votavova
2023	(Denmark) Esbjerg	Overall	Netherlands	Overall	England	Overall	England
2023	(Denmark) Esbjerg	Singles	(Netherlands) Berry van Peer	Singles	(England) Beau Greaves	Boys Singles	(England) Jenson Walker
2023	(Denmark) Esbjerg	Pairs	(New Zealand) Haupai Puha & Ben Robb	Pairs	(England) Deta Hedman & Beau Greaves	Boys Pairs	(England) Jenson Walker & Thomas Banks
2023	(Denmark) Esbjerg	Team	(Netherlands) Jelle Klaasen, Wesley Plaisier, Ryan de Vreede, Berry van Peer	Team	(Republic of Ireland) Robyn Byrne, Caroline Breen, Aoife McCormack, Katie Sheldon	Girls Singles	(England) Paige Pauling
2023	(Denmark) Esbjerg					Girls Pairs	(England) Paige Pauling & Hannah Meek
2023	(Denmark) Esbjerg					Mixed	(England) Paige Pauling & Thomas Banks
2025	(South Korea) Seoul	Overall	Japan	Overall	Ireland	Overall	Netherlands
2025	(South Korea) Seoul	Singles	(Austria) Franko Giuliani	Singles	(Philippines) Lovely-Mae Orbeta	Boys Singles	(Canada) Peyton Hammond
2025	(South Korea) Seoul	Pairs	(Italy) Alex Bassetti & Daniele Petri	Pairs	(Japan) Kosuzu Iwao & Shiori Sato	Boys Pairs	(Republic of Ireland) Aidan O'Hara & Jack Courtney
2025	(South Korea) Seoul	Team	(Wales) David Davies, Llew Bevan, Liam Meek, Mark Challenger	Team	(Republic of Ireland) Katie Sheldon, Robyn Byrne, Aoife McCormack, Denise Cassidy	Girls Singles	(Turkey) Ayşegül Karagöz
2025	(South Korea) Seoul					Girls Pairs	(Chinese Taipei) Tsai Yung-En & Yang Yi-Ching
2025	(South Korea) Seoul					Mixed	(Netherlands) Kendji Steinbach & Kimberly Kersbergen

== See also ==
- List of WDF tournaments
- List of BDO ranked tournaments
- World Professional Darts Championship
- BDO World Darts Championship
- PDC World Darts Championship
- WDF World Darts Championship
- World Masters (darts)
- WDF Europe Cup
- WDF Asia-Pacific Cup
- WDF Americas Cup
