= Johan Engström =

Swedish darts player (born 1976)

Personal information
- Nickname: Sweet Ferret
- Born: 16 July 1976 (age 50) Södertälje, Sweden

Sport
- Sport: Darts
- Playing since: 2003
- Darts: 21g Dimitri Van den Bergh
- Laterality: Right-handed
- Walk-on music: "You're the Best" by Joe "Bean" Esposito

Organisation (see split in darts)
- BDO: 2004–2020
- PDC: 2012–present
- WDF: 2004–present
- Current world ranking: (PDC) 149 ▼1 (18 October 2026) (WDF) 103 ▼12 (17 August 2026)

WDF major events – best performances
- World Championship: Last 48: 2025
- World Masters: Last 32: 2015, 2022

PDC premier events – best performances
- World Series Finals: Last 32: 2024

Other tournament wins
- Years
Estonian Open	2011
Finnish Open	2012, 2023
Nordic Cup	2012
Northern Cyprus Open	2024
PDCNB Tour	2024 (x2)
Medal record
Men's Darts
Representing Sweden
WDF World Cup
Silver medal – second place	2011 Castlebar	Men's pairs
Bronze medal – third place	2011 Castlebar	Men's team
Bronze medal – third place	2011 Castlebar	Men's overall
Bronze medal – third place	2023 Esbjerg	Men's team
Bronze medal – third place	2025 Seoul	Men's team
WDF Europe Cup
Gold medal – first place	2024 Šamorín	Men's pairs
Gold medal – first place	2024 Šamorín	Men's team
Gold medal – first place	2024 Šamorín	Men's overall

Johan Engström (born 16 July 1976) is a Swedish professional darts player who competes in Professional Darts Corporation (PDC) and World Darts Federation (WDF) events.

Known as the "Sweet Ferret", Engström has made multiple appearances on the PDC European Tour via the Nordic & Baltic qualifiers, and made his debut for Sweden at the 2021 PDC World Cup of Darts alongside Daniel Larsson.

== Performance timeline ==
=== BDO ===
Tournament	2011	2012	2015	2016
BDO Ranked major events
World Masters	1R	1R	5R	1R

=== WDF ===
Tournament	2022	2024	2025
WDF Ranked major/platinum events
World Championship	DNQ		1R
World Masters	4R	QF	QF

=== PDC ===
Tournament	2021	2022	2024
PDC Non-ranked televised events
World Cup	1R	2R	DNQ
World Series Finals	Did not qualify		1R

==== European Tour ====
Season	1	2	3	4	5	6	7	8	9	10	11	12	13	14	15
2018	Did not qualify					DDM; 1R	Did not qualify								
2019	Did not qualify				ADO; 1R	Did not qualify									
2021	HDT; 1R	GDT; DNQ													
2022	DNQ			ADO; 1R	DNQ		EDG; 2R	DDC; DNQ	EDM; 1R	Did not qualify					
2024	DNQ			EDG; 2R	Did not qualify				GDC; 1R	Did not qualify					
2025	DNQ			GDG; 1R	ADO; DNQ	EDG; 1R	DNQ		BSD; 1R	FDT; 1R	DNQ				
2026	DNQ						IDO; 1R	BSD; DNQ	SDO; 1R	DNQ		CDO; 1R	DNQ		

Performance Table Legend
W	Won the tournament	F	Finalist	SF	Semifinalist	QF	Quarterfinalist	#R; RR; Prel.	Lost in # round Round-robin; Preliminary round	DQ	Disqualified
DNQ	Did not qualify	DNP	Did not participate	WD	Withdrew	NH	Tournament not held	#R; RR; Prel.	Lost in # round Round-robin; Preliminary round	NYF	Not yet founded
