= 1996 WDF Europe Cup =

Tournament information
- Venue: Astoria Convention Centre
- Location: Bundoran
- Country: (Republic of Ireland) Ireland
- Established: 9 Oct-12 Oct
- Organisation(s): WDF
- Format: Legs

Champion(s)
- Singles; Martin Adams (men's singles) (Netherlands) Francis Hoenselaar (women's singles); Pairs; Martin Adams & Andy Fordham (men's pairs) (England) Deta Hedman & Mandy Solomons (women's pairs); Team; England (men's team); Overall; England (men's overall); England (women's overall)

The 1996 WDF Europe Cup was the 10th edition of the WDF Europe Cup darts tournament, organised by the World Darts Federation. It was held in Bundoran, Ireland from 9 to 12 October.

== Entered Teams ==
24 countries/associations entered a team in the event.

Nr.	Country	Men's Selection
1	Austria	Franz Thaler, Vasil Hristovski, Franz Strobl, Axel Tschinkowitz
2	Belgium	Rudi Ladang, Pascal Rabau, Stefan Eeckelaert, Leo Laurens
3	Cyprus	George Trypiniotis, Ioannis Ioannoy, Demetris Georgiou, Loucas Themistoclous
3	Czech Republic	Ondres Veselovsky, Pavel Veselovsky, Jaroslav Zenisek, Blaine Karst
4	Denmark	Henrik Larsen-Primdal, Jan Guldsten, Olle Nissen, Anders Pedersen
5	England	Martin Adams, Steve Beaton, Ronnie Baxter, Andy Fordham
6	Finland	Jari Siren, Ari Ilmanen, Jarkko Komula, Marko Kantele
7	France	Pascal Fontaine, Serge Farrando, Stephane Dalancon, Cristian Le Borgne
8	Germany	Colin Rice, Andreas Krockel, Andreas Schendel, Frank Mast
9	Greece	Paris Chloros, Akis Mavrogalos, Christos Padazopoulos, Kostas Sakellariou
10	Gibraltar	George Federico, Francis Taylor, James King, John Neale
11	Hungary	Gabor Tarrosi, Istvan Ban, István Csitári, Attila Laibl
12	Ireland	Mick McGowan, John Joe O'Shea, Jack McKenna, Seamus Gormley
13	Isle of Man	Paul Sertin, Geoffrey Gilbert, Charlie Cover, Robbie Cannell
14	Italy	Andrea Barbo, Giorgio Sartor, Daniele Nocent, Alberto De Corti
15	Latvia	Janis Straume, Eglis Vitols, Uldis Erkis, Ivaers Adamson
16	Malta	Vincent Busuttil, Godfrey Abela, Alfred Desira, Emmanuel Ciantar
17	Netherlands	Braulio Roncero, Co Stompé, Raymond van Barneveld, Roland Scholten
18	Northern Ireland	Louis Doherty, Charlie Gaile, John Magowan, Geoff Wylie
19	Norway	Thor-Helmer Johansen, Stein Trondsen, Arne Sivertsen, Per-Otto Jacobsen
20	Scotland	Andy Wallace, Bob Taylor, Les Wallace, Alan Brown
21	Spain	Juan Salpico, Antonio Hibernon-Cano, Jose-Real Maron, Lorenzo Penas
22	Sweden	Stefan Nagy, Jan-Erik Hermansson, Jonas Bergström, Ronny Rohr
23	Switzerland	Walter Tschudin, Urs Von Rufs, Gaudenz Coray, Rene Handschin
24	Wales	Marshall James, Eric Burden, Sean Palfrey, Mark Salmon
