= 2013 WDF World Cup =

Tournament information
- Dates: October 1–5, 2013
- Venue: PowerPlex
- Location: St. John's, NL
- Country: Canada
- Organisation(s): WDF category Major

Champion(s)
- Singles (Netherlands) Wesley Harms (men's singles) (England) Deta Hedman (women's singles); Jamie Rundle (boys' singles) (England) Casey Gallagher (girls' singles); Pairs (England) Stephen Bunting & Tony O'Shea (men's pairs) (England) Trina Gulliver & Deta Hedman (women's pairs) (Canada) Dawson Murschell & Alicia Looker (youth mixed); Team; Scotland (men's team); Overall; United States (men's overall); United States (women's overall); Australia (youth overall)

The 2013 WDF World Cup was the 19th edition of the WDF World Cup darts tournament, organised by the World Darts Federation. It was held in St. John's, Newfoundland and Labrador, Canada from October 1 to 5.

== Entered teams ==
27 countries/associations entered a team in the event, which is eleven less than 2011. Not all teams took part in all events (for example Switzerland did not enter the youth events).

Australia
(The Bahamas) Bahamas
Barbados
Bermuda
Brazil
Canada
Denmark
England
Finland

Germany
Iceland
Italy
Japan
Jersey
Netherlands
Northern Ireland
Norway
Republic of Ireland

Scotland
South Africa
Sweden
Switzerland
Trinidad and Tobago
Turks and Caicos Islands
Turkey
United States
Wales

Guyana and Uganda originally entered but both pulled out with visa issues

== Men's singles ==
Third round
(England)	Stephen Bunting	4
(South Africa)	Jan Smith	0
(Brazil)	Diogo Portela	0
(Switzerland)	Rocco Fulciniti	4
(Canada)	Troy Hanlon	2
(Scotland)	Alan Soutar	4
(Denmark)	Glenn Honore	3
(Netherlands)	Benito van de Pas	4
(Brazil)	Mario Portela	0
(Wales)	Wayne Warren	4
(Japan)	Hiroaki Shimizu	1
(Australia)	Peter Machin	4
(South Africa)	Mathinus Grobbelaar	4
(Northern Ireland)	Philip Carson	2
(United States)	Tom Sawyer	4
(Germany)	Karsten Koch	1
(Sweden)	Daniel Larsson	2
(Switzerland)	Thomas Bremgartner	4
(England)	Tony O'Shea	4
(Scotland)	Craig Baxter	0
(Turkey)	Cemal Gingi	3
(United States)	Larry Butler	4
(Northern Ireland)	Kevin Burness	4
(Netherlands)	Rick Hofstra	3
(Australia)	Eddy Sims	2
(South Africa)	Christo Meiring	4
(Denmark)	Stig Jørgensen	0
(Switzerland)	Thomas Junghans	4
(Canada)	Chris Wallace	2
(Netherlands)	Wesley Harms	4
(Finland)	Kim Viljanen	4
(Wales)	David Smith Hayes	0

Fourth round
(England)	Stephen Bunting	4
(Switzerland)	Rocco Fulciniti	0
(Scotland)	Alan Soutar	4
(Netherlands)	Benito van de Pas	3
(Wales)	Wayne Warren	4
(Australia)	Peter Machin	2
(South Africa)	Mathinus Grobbelaar	2
(United States)	Tom Sawyer	4
(Switzerland)	Thomas Bremgartner	0
(England)	Tony O'Shea	4
(United States)	Larry Butler	3
(Northern Ireland)	Kevin Burness	4
(South Africa)	Christo Meiring	4
(Switzerland)	Thomas Junghans	1
(Netherlands)	Wesley Harms	4
(Finland)	Kim Viljanen	1

Quarter-finals
(England)	Stephen Bunting	5
(Scotland)	Alan Soutar	4
(Wales)	Wayne Warren	5
(United States)	Tom Sawyer	4
(England)	Tony O'Shea	5
(Northern Ireland)	Kevin Burness	3
(South Africa)	Christo Meiring	0
(Netherlands)	Wesley Harms	5

Semi-finals
(England)	Stephen Bunting	6
(Wales)	Wayne Warren	2
(England)	Tony O'Shea	2
(Netherlands)	Wesley Harms	6

Final
(England)	Stephen Bunting	6
(Netherlands)	Wesley Harms	7

== Women's singles ==
Round of 64
(England)	Trina Gulliver	-
bye	-
(Sweden)	Anna Forsmark	4
(South Africa)	Junita Abrahams	0
(Japan)	Tamao Gunji	0
(United States)	Brenda Roush	4
(Wales)	Rhian Edwards	4
(Trinidad and Tobago)	Charmaine H Marshall	0
(Australia)	Natalie Carter	-
bye	-
(Turks and Caicos Islands)	Delphine Simons	0
(Norway)	Rachna David	4
(Finland)	Maret Liiri	4
(Italy)	Giada Ciofi	0
bye	-
(Germany)	Irina Armstrong	-
(Republic of Ireland)	Olive McIntyre	-
bye	-
(Turkey)	Eda Erdem Kemaoglu	0
(Switzerland)	Fiona Gaylor	4
(Barbados)	Shelley Taylor	4
(Northern Ireland)	Kelly McGivern	3
bye	-
(The Bahamas)	Sandra Ferguson	-
(Netherlands)	Sharon Prins	4
(Brazil)	Maria Ana	0
(Iceland)	Ólafía Gudmundsdóttir	0
(Denmark)	Mette Funch	4
(Scotland)	Louise Hepburn	-
bye	-
bye	-
(Canada)	Cindy Hayhurst	-
(Finland)	Kirsi Viinikainen	-
bye	-
(Northern Ireland)	Grace Crane	4
(Norway)	Marta Krol	2
(United States)	Cali West	4
(Brazil)	Adelia Tavares	0
bye	-
(Republic of Ireland)	Caroline Breen	-
(Italy)	Veleda Gaiga	-
bye	-
(Canada)	Dianne Gobeil	4
(Barbados)	Elouise Martin	0
(England)	Deta Hedman	4
(Denmark)	Janni Larsen	0
bye	-
(Japan)	Kiyo Shimizu	-
(Netherlands)	Floortje van Zanten	-
bye	-
(Sweden)	Kristin Bomander	4
(Trinidad and Tobago)	Petrica Massiah	0
(Australia)	Corrine Hammond	4
(Turks and Caicos Islands)	Danzella Jennings	0
bye	-
(Iceland)	Elinborg Björnsdóttir	-
(Switzerland)	Jeannette Stoop	4
(The Bahamas)	Faith Sawyer	0
(Germany)	Anne Willkomm	4
(Scotland)	Frances Lawson	0
(Turkey)	Rabia Dolgun	1
(South Africa)	Tanya Thomas	4
bye	-
(Wales)	Julie Gore	-

Round of 32
(England)	Trina Gulliver	4
(Sweden)	Anna Forsmark	2
(United States)	Brenda Roush	0
(Wales)	Rhian Edwards	4
(Australia)	Natalie Carter	1
(Norway)	Rachna David	4
(Finland)	Maret Liiri	1
(Germany)	Irina Armstrong	4
(Republic of Ireland)	Olive McIntyre	4
(Switzerland)	Fiona Gaylor	2
(Barbados)	Shelley Taylor	4
(The Bahamas)	Sandra Ferguson	0
(Netherlands)	Sharon Prins	4
(Denmark)	Mette Funch	1
(Scotland)	Louise Hepburn	0
(Canada)	Cindy Hayhurst	4
(Finland)	Kirsi Viinikainen	4
(Northern Ireland)	Grace Crane	2
(United States)	Cali West	4
(Republic of Ireland)	Caroline Breen	1
(Italy)	Veleda Gaiga	1
(Canada)	Dianne Gobeil	4
(England)	Deta Hedman	4
(Japan)	Kiyo Shimizu	3
(Netherlands)	Floortje van Zanten	1
(Sweden)	Kristin Bomander	4
(Australia)	Corrine Hammond	4
(Iceland)	Elinborg Björnsdóttir	0
(Switzerland)	Jeannette Stoop	4
(Germany)	Anna Willkomm	2
(South Africa)	Tanya Thomas	1
(Wales)	Julie Gore	4

Round of 16
(England)	Trina Gulliver	3
(Wales)	Rhian Edwards	4
(Norway)	Rachna David	3
(Germany)	Irina Armstrong	4
(Republic of Ireland)	Olive McIntyre	3
(Barbados)	Shelley Taylor	4
(Netherlands)	Sharon Prins	2
(Canada)	Cindy Hayhurst	4
(Finland)	Kirsi Viinikainen	4
(United States)	Cali West	1
(Canada)	Dianne Gobeil	2
(England)	Deta Hedman	4
(Sweden)	Kristin Bomander	3
(Australia)	Corrine Hammond	4
(Switzerland)	Jeannette Stoop	4
(Wales)	Julie Gore	3

Quarterfinals
(Wales)	Rhian Edwards	3
(Germany)	Irina Armstrong	5
(Barbados)	Shelley Taylor	1
(Canada)	Cindy Hayhurst	5
(Finland)	Kirsi Viinikainen	4
(England)	Deta Hedman	5
(Australia)	Corrine Hammond	5
(Switzerland)	Jeannette Stoop	3

Semifinals
(Germany)	Irina Armstrong	6
(Canada)	Cindy Hayhurst	4
(England)	Deta Hedman	6
(Australia)	Corrine Hammond	4

Finals
(Germany)	Irina Armstrong	5
(England)	Deta Hedman	7

== Men's team ==
First round
England	9
Northern Ireland	2
Wales	9
(Republic of Ireland) Ireland	5
(United States) USA	9
Finland	4
Japan	3
Denmark	9
Sweden	9
Canada	1
Australia	9
Switzerland	1
Norway	9
Germany	5
Scotland	9
South Africa	5

Quarter-finals
England	9
Wales	4
(United States) USA	9
Denmark	6
Sweden	9
Australia	4
Norway	5
Scotland	9

Semi-finals
England	2
(United States) USA	9
Sweden	5
Scotland	9

Final
(United States) USA	7
Scotland	9

== Men's Pairs ==
Round of 32
(England) Bunting/O'Shea	4
(South Africa) Julal/Smith	2
(Norway) Elvevoll/David	4
(Republic of Ireland) Cullen/McDonnell	1
(Japan) Shimizu/Asada	4
(Jersey) Eusebini/Quemard	2
(Italy) Contino/Mantarro	4
(Sweden) Andersson/Nilsson	2
(Wales) Smith-Hayes/Clayton	4
(The Bahamas) Bain/Copeland	1
(Canada) Cameron/Wallace	4
(Barbados) Forde/Murrell	0
(Netherlands) Harms/van de Pas	1
(Australia) Machin/Bailey	4
(Finland) Viljanen/Roberts	3
(Scotland) Montgomery/Soutar	4
(Sweden) Larsson/Efraimsson	4
(Bermuda) Lewis/Coleman	0
(Australia) Sims/Miles	3
(The Bahamas) Albury/Lewis	4
(Barbados) Griffith/Edwards	0
(Canada) St. Croix/Hanlon	4
(Germany) Rice/Koch	2
(South Africa) Meiring/Grobbelaar	4
(Italy) Sergi/Vigato	1
(England) Waites/Durrant	4
(United States) Butler/Dixon	2
(Denmark) Jorgensen/Honorè	4
(Scotland) Baxter/Stone	4
(Brazil) Portela/Portela	0
(Netherlands) van Eijden/Hofstra	4
(Finland) Nuutinen/Niskala	0

Round of 16
(England) Bunting/O'Shea	4
(Norway) Elvevoll/David	3
(Japan) Shimizu/Asada	3
(Italy) Contino/Mantarro	4
(Wales) Smith-Hayes/Clayton	4
(Canada) Cameron/Wallace	2
(Australia) Machin/Bailey	0
(Scotland) Montgomery/Soutar	4
(Sweden) Larsson/Efraimsson	3
(The Bahamas) Albury/Lewis	4
(Canada) St. Croix/Hanlon	0
(South Africa) Meiring/Grobbelaar	4
(England) Waites/Durrant	4
(Denmark) Jorgensen/Honorè	1
(Scotland) Baxter/Stone	4
(Netherlands) van Eijden/Hofstra	3

Quarterfinals
(England) Bunting/O'Shea	4
(Italy) Contino/Mantarro	3
(Wales) Smith-Hayes/Clayton	4
(Scotland) Montgomery/Soutar	1
(The Bahamas) Albury/Lewis	0
(South Africa) Meiring/Grobbelaar	4
(England) Waites/Durrant	4
(Scotland) Baxter/Stone	0

Semifinals
(England) Bunting/O'Shea	5
(Wales) Smith-Hayes/Clayton	4
(South Africa) Meiring/Grobbelaar	5
(England) Waites/Durrant	3

Finals
(England) Bunting/O'Shea	6
(South Africa) Meiring/Grobbelaar	0

== Women's Pairs ==
Quarter Finals onwards. Full draw - https://web.archive.org/web/20131008062922/http://dartswdf.com/WC2013/WDFWorldCup2013WomensPairsRoundRobin.pdf

Quarter-finals

Semi-finals

Final

== Youth Winners ==
Event	Winner	Score	Runner-up
Youth Singles - Boys	(Australia) Jamie Rundle	6–0	(Netherlands) Quin Wester
Youth Singles - Girls	(England) Casey Gallagher	6–3	(Australia) Tiarna Smith
Youth Pairs	(Canada) Murschell/Looker	6–4	(Australia) Rundle/Smith

== Final Points Tables ==
=== Men ===
Ranking	Team	Points
1	England	127
2	Scotland	102
3	United States	61
4	South Africa	58
5	Wales	54

=== Women ===
Ranking	Team	Points
1	England	60
2	Canada	37
3	Germany	26
4	Wales	23
5	Australia	20

=== Youth ===
Ranking	Team	Points
1	Australia	69
2	England	61
3	Canada	56
4	Denmark	35
5	Netherlands	35
