= Gary Stone =

Scottish darts player

Gary Stone (born 19 June 1981) is a Scottish professional darts player who currently plays in the World Darts Federation tournaments.

== Career ==
=== BDO ===
Stone qualified for the 2012 BDO World Championship and reached the last 16, defeating Ron Meulenkamp 3–0 but losing 4–0 to Martin Adams. He won the WDF Europe Cup, beating reigning world champion Christian Kist in the final. He qualified for the 2013 BDO World Championship and lost 3–1 to Steve Douglas in the first round.

Stone was part of the Scotland team that won gold in the men's team event at the WDF World Cup in 2013, with teammates Ross Montgomery, Craig Baxter and Alan Soutar. Scotland defeated America 9–7 in the team final. Stone also helped Scotland win silver in the overall competition.

In 2019, Gary Stone won the Swedish Classic, defeating John Scott 5–2 in the final.

=== PDC ===
Stone entered the PDC Q School in January 2014, and secured a tour card on the third day with a 5–2 win over Steve Grubb in the final round. He made his debut in the European Tour at the European Darts Open in July, losing 6–4 to Ryan de Vreede in the first round. He also reached the last 32 of two Players Championship events during the season.

He qualified for the 2015 German Darts Masters and overcame Rowby-John Rodriguez 6–4, before losing 6–2 to Michael van Gerwen. Stone also reached the second round of the Dutch Darts Masters by beating Dean Winstanley 6–4 with an average of almost 100, but then narrowly lost 6–5 to Steve Beaton. His tour card expired at the end of 2015 and with Stone ranked 100th on the Order of Merit he needed to enter Q School. A single last 16 showing over the four days was not enough for Stone to win his place back. A trio of last 64 defeats saw him qualify for the 2016 UK Open, where he beat Johnny Haines 6–5, before losing 6–2 to Jamie Caven in the second round. Stone played in the majority of Challenge Tour events, with two last 16 defeats being his best runs.

== World Championship results ==
=== BDO ===
- 2012: Second round (lost to Martin Adams 0–4)
- 2013: First round (lost to Steve Douglas 1–3)
- 2020: First round (lost to Jim Williams 2–3)

=== WDF ===
- 2023: Third round (lost to Andy Baetens 1–3)
- 2024: Third round (lost to Paul Lim 2–3)
