= WDF Europe Cup =

Tournament information
- Venue: Various
- Location: Various
- Established: 1978
- Organisation(s): WDF
- Format: Legs

Current champion(s)
- Singles; Dennie Olde Kalter (men's singles) (Republic of Ireland) Robyn Byrne (women's singles); Pairs; Andreas Harrysson & Johan Engström (men's pairs) (Netherlands) Aletta Wajer & Noa-Lynn van Leuven (women's pairs); Team; Sweden (men's team); Netherlands (women's team); Overall; Sweden (men's overall); Netherlands (women's overall)

The WDF Europe Cup is a darts tournament held biennially since 1978. The tournament consists of a team championship, a pairs championship and a singles championship. All events have a men's competition, and a women's competition (since 1982).

== Tournament structure ==
The country achieving the highest total of points from all three events shall be crowned the WDF Europe Cup Champions. In the event of a tie for first place those countries shall be declared the Joint WDF Europe Cup Champions.

The WDF announced in early 2014 that a women's team (fours) event would be added to the schedule for the first time at the 2014 Europe Cup as well as future WDF Europe and World Cup tournaments. The most recent Europe Cup was held in 2024, in Šamorín, Slovakia.

== Previous winners ==
Year	Venue	Men's Europe Cup		Women's Europe Cup	
1978	(Denmark) Copenhagen	Overall	England		
1978	(Denmark) Copenhagen	Singles	(England) John Lowe		
1978	(Denmark) Copenhagen	Pairs	(England) Eric Bristow & John Lowe		
1978	(Denmark) Copenhagen	Team	(Scotland) Jocky Wilson, Rab Smith, George Nicholl, Eric MacLean		
1980	(Wales) Ebbw Vale	Overall	England		
1980	(Wales) Ebbw Vale	Singles	(England) Tony Brown		
1980	(Wales) Ebbw Vale	Pairs	(Sweden) Stefan Lord & Björn Enqvist		
1980	(Wales) Ebbw Vale	Team	(England) Eric Bristow, John Lowe, Tony Brown, Cliff Lazarenko		
1982	(England) Southend	Overall	England	Overall	Wales
1982	(England) Southend	Singles	(England) Bobby George	Singles	(Wales) Sandra Gibb
1982	(England) Southend	Pairs	(Sweden) Stefan Lord & Björn Enqvist	Pairs	(Sweden) Charlotte Eriksson & Carina Sahlberg
1982	(England) Southend	Team	(England) Eric Bristow, Dave Whitcombe, Bobby George, Cliff Lazarenko	Team	Not Held
1984	(Netherlands) The Hague	Overall	England	Overall	England
1984	(Netherlands) The Hague	Singles	(England) John Lowe	Singles	(England) Linda Batten
1984	(Netherlands) The Hague	Pairs	(England) Cliff Lazarenko & Dave Whitcombe	Pairs	(England) Linda Batten & Sharon Kemp
1984	(Netherlands) The Hague	Team	(England) Eric Bristow, John Lowe, Dave Whitcombe, Cliff Lazarenko	Team	Not Held
1986	(Finland) Turku	Overall	England	Overall	England
1986	(Finland) Turku	Singles	(England) John Lowe	Singles	(England) Jayne Kempster
1986	(Finland) Turku	Pairs	(England) Eric Bristow & John Lowe	Pairs	(England) Linda Batten & Jayne Kempster
1986	(Finland) Turku	Team	(England) Eric Bristow, John Lowe, Dave Whitcombe, Cliff Lazarenko	Team	Not Held
1988	(England) Great Yarmouth	Overall	England	Overall	England
1988	(England) Great Yarmouth	Singles	(England) Mike Gregory	Singles	(England) Sue Edwards
1988	(England) Great Yarmouth	Pairs	(Sweden) Stefan Lord & Lars Erik Karlsson	Pairs	(Wales) Linda Rogers & Ann Thomas
1988	(England) Great Yarmouth	Team	(Wales) Eric Burden, Chris Johns, Richie Burnett, Geraint Wilson	Team	Not Held
1990	(Malta) Verdala	Overall	England	Overall	England
1990	(Malta) Verdala	Singles	(England) Phil Taylor	Singles	(England) Sue Edwards
1990	(Malta) Verdala	Pairs	(England) Phil Taylor & Bob Anderson	Pairs	(England) Sharon Colclough & Sue Edwards
1990	(Malta) Verdala	Team	(England) Eric Bristow, John Lowe, Phil Taylor, Bob Anderson	Team	Not Held
1992	(Finland) Helsinki	Overall	England	Overall	Wales
1992	(Finland) Helsinki	Singles	(England) Phil Taylor	Singles	(Germany) Heike Ernst
1992	(Finland) Helsinki	Pairs	(Scotland) Ronnie Sharp & Jamie Harvey	Pairs	(Wales) Rhian Speed & Sandra Greatbatch
1992	(Finland) Helsinki	Team	(England) John Lowe, Phil Taylor, Bob Anderson, Alan Warriner	Team	Not Held
1994	(Sweden) Stockholm	Overall	England	Overall	England
1994	(Sweden) Stockholm	Singles	(England) Steve Beaton	Singles	(England) Deta Hedman
1994	(Sweden) Stockholm	Pairs	(Wales) Eric Burden & Martin Phillips	Pairs	(England) Deta Hedman & Tammy Montgomery
1994	(Sweden) Stockholm	Team	(England) Steve Beaton, Martin Adams, Ronnie Baxter, Kevin Kenny	Team	Not Held
1996	(Republic of Ireland) Bundoran	Overall	England	Overall	England
1996	(Republic of Ireland) Bundoran	Singles	(England) Martin Adams	Singles	(Netherlands) Francis Hoenselaar
1996	(Republic of Ireland) Bundoran	Pairs	(England) Martin Adams & Andy Fordham	Pairs	(England) Deta Hedman & Mandy Solomons
1996	(Republic of Ireland) Bundoran	Team	(England) Steve Beaton, Martin Adams, Ronnie Baxter, Andy Fordham	Team	Not Held
1998	(Norway) Oslo	Overall	Wales	Overall	England
1998	(Norway) Oslo	Singles	(Netherlands) Co Stompé	Singles	(Northern Ireland) Denise Cassidy
1998	(Norway) Oslo	Pairs	(Wales) Sean Palfrey & Martin Phillips	Pairs	(England) Trina Gulliver & Mandy Solomons
1998	(Norway) Oslo	Team	(England) Steve Beaton, Martin Adams, Ronnie Baxter, Andy Fordham	Team	Not Held
2000	(Netherlands) Veldhoven	Overall	England	Overall	Netherlands
2000	(Netherlands) Veldhoven	Singles	(Northern Ireland) Mitchell Crooks	Singles	(England) Trina Gulliver
2000	(Netherlands) Veldhoven	Pairs	(Netherlands) Raymond van Barneveld & Co Stompé	Pairs	(Netherlands) Francis Hoenselaar & Karin Krappen
2000	(Netherlands) Veldhoven	Team	(England) Martin Adams, Mervyn King, Kevin Painter, Ted Hankey	Team	Not Held
2002	(Belgium) Mechelen	Overall	Scotland	Overall	Netherlands
2002	(Belgium) Mechelen	Singles	(Scotland) Peter Johnstone	Singles	(England) Claire Bywaters
2002	(Belgium) Mechelen	Pairs	(England) Martin Adams & Mervyn King	Pairs	(Netherlands) Francis Hoenselaar & Karin Krappen
2002	(Belgium) Mechelen	Team	(Scotland) Mike Veitch, Peter Johnstone, Gary Anderson, George Dalglish	Team	Not Held
2004	(Finland) Tampere	Overall	Netherlands	Overall	England
2004	(Finland) Tampere	Singles	(Netherlands) Raymond van Barneveld	Singles	(Netherlands) Francis Hoenselaar
2004	(Finland) Tampere	Pairs	(Netherlands) Raymond van Barneveld & Vincent van der Voort	Pairs	(England) Trina Gulliver & Clare Bywaters
2004	(Finland) Tampere	Team	(England) Martin Adams, Mervyn King, John Walton, Ted Hankey	Team	Not Held
2006	(Republic of Ireland) Ennis	Overall	Netherlands	Overall	England
2006	(Republic of Ireland) Ennis	Singles	(Wales) Mark Webster	Singles	(England) Trina Gulliver
2006	(Republic of Ireland) Ennis	Pairs	(Scotland) Paul Hanvidge & Paul McGimpsey	Pairs	(England) Trina Gulliver & Clare Bywaters
2006	(Republic of Ireland) Ennis	Team	(Netherlands) Co Stompé, Vincent van der Voort, Jelle Klaasen, Niels de Ruiter	Team	Not Held
2008	(Denmark) Copenhagen	Overall	Denmark	Overall	Scotland
2008	(Denmark) Copenhagen	Singles	(Wales) Mark Webster	Singles	(Scotland) Louise Hepburn
2008	(Denmark) Copenhagen	Pairs	(England) Martin Adams & John Walton	Pairs	(Sweden) Grethel Glasö & Carina Ekberg
2008	(Denmark) Copenhagen	Team	(Denmark) Per Laursen, Frede Johansen, Stig Jørgensen, Preben Krabben	Team	Not Held
2010	(Turkey) Antalya	Overall	England	Overall	Wales
2010	(Turkey) Antalya	Singles	(Wales) Martin Phillips	Singles	(Netherlands) Francis Hoenselaar
2010	(Turkey) Antalya	Pairs	(England) Martin Adams & Scott Waites	Pairs	(Wales) Julie Gore & Rhian Edwards
2010	(Turkey) Antalya	Team	(Belgium) Ronny Huybrechts, Kim Huybrechts, Kurt van de Rijck, Geert De Vos	Team	Not Held
2012	(Turkey) Antalya	Overall	Netherlands	Overall	Netherlands
2012	(Turkey) Antalya	Singles	(Scotland) Gary Stone	Singles	(Belgium) Patricia De Peuter
2012	(Turkey) Antalya	Pairs	(Netherlands) Jan Dekker & Christian Kist	Pairs	(Netherlands) Karin Krappen & Tamara Schuur
2012	(Turkey) Antalya	Team	(Netherlands) Christian Kist, Wesley Harms, Jan Dekker, Benito van de Pas	Team	Not Held
2014	(Romania) Bucharest	Overall	England	Overall	England
2014	(Romania) Bucharest	Singles	(Republic of Ireland) David Concannon	Singles	(Russia) Anastasia Dobromyslova
2014	(Romania) Bucharest	Pairs	(England) Scott Waites & Scott Mitchell	Pairs	(Germany) Irina Armstrong & Anne Willkomm
2014	(Romania) Bucharest	Team	(Wales) Jonny Clayton, Martin Phillips, David Smith-Hayes, Wayne Warren	Team	(England) Deta Hedman, Lisa Ashton, Lorraine Winstanley, Trina Gulliver
2016	(Netherlands) Egmond aan Zee	Overall	Netherlands	Overall	England
2016	(Netherlands) Egmond aan Zee	Singles	(Netherlands) Richard Veenstra	Singles	(Netherlands) Sharon Prins
2016	(Netherlands) Egmond aan Zee	Pairs	(Netherlands) Wesley Harms & Richard Veenstra	Pairs	(Wales) Rhian Edwards & Rhian Griffiths
2016	(Netherlands) Egmond aan Zee	Team	(England) Scott Mitchell, Glen Durrant, Jamie Hughes, James Hurrell	Team	(England) Trina Gulliver, Deta Hedman, Fallon Sherrock, Lorraine Winstanley
2018	(Hungary) Budapest	Overall	England	Overall	England
2018	(Hungary) Budapest	Singles	(Republic of Ireland) Martin Heneghan	Singles	(Switzerland) Fiona Gaylor
2018	(Hungary) Budapest	Pairs	(England) Scott Mitchell & Daniel Day	Pairs	(England) Deta Hedman & Maria O'Brien
2018	(Hungary) Budapest	Team	(Sweden) Andreas Harrysson, Daniel Larsson, Edwin Torbjörnsson, Oskar Lukasiak	Team	(England) Maria O'Brien, Deta Hedman, Fallon Sherrock, Lorraine Winstanley
2022	(Spain) Gandía	Overall	England	Overall	England
2022	(Spain) Gandía	Singles	(France) Jacques Labre	Singles	(England) Beau Greaves
2022	(Spain) Gandía	Pairs	(England) Joshua Richardson & Scott Williams	Pairs	(England) Beau Greaves & Deta Hedman
2022	(Spain) Gandía	Team	(England) James Hurrell, Luke Littler, Joshua Richardson, Scott Williams	Team	(England) Claire Brookin, Beau Greaves, Deta Hedman, Lorraine Winstanley
2024	Slovakia	Overall	Sweden	Overall	Netherlands
2024	Slovakia	Singles	(Netherlands) Dennie Olde Kalter	Singles	(Republic of Ireland) Robyn Byrne
2024	Slovakia	Pairs	(Sweden) Johan Engström & Andreas Harrysson	Pairs	(Netherlands) Aletta Wajer & Noa-Lynn van Leuven
2024	Slovakia	Team	(Sweden) Johan Engström, Andreas Harrysson, Edwin Torbjörnsson, Viktor Tingström	Team	(Netherlands) Aletta Wajer, Noa-Lynn van Leuven, Lerena Rietbergen, Priscilla Steenbergen
