= 2011 WDF World Cup =

18th WDF World Cup darts tournament

The 2011 WDF World Cup was the 18th edition of the WDF World Cup darts tournament, organised by the World Darts Federation. It was held in Castlebar, Republic of Ireland from September 21 to 24.

== Entered teams ==
38 countries/associations entered a team and then played in the event. Not all teams took part in all events (for example Scotland did not enter the youth events).

Australia Austria (The Bahamas) Bahamas Barbados Belgium Brazil Canada Catalonia Czech Republic Denmark	England Finland Germany Iceland India Iran Isle of Man Italy Japan Latvia	Lithuania Luxembourg Netherlands Northern Ireland Norway Poland Republic of Ireland Romania Russia	Scotland South Africa Spain Sweden Switzerland (Trinidad and Tobago) Trinidad & Tobago Turkey United States Wales

Slovenia also entered a team but did not compete.

== Men's singles ==
Last 64 onwards. Full results - https://web.archive.org/web/20120324192412/http://dartswdf.com/WC2011/WDFWorldCup2011MensSingles.pdf

Second round
(England)	Martin Adams	4
(Denmark)	Stig Jørgensen	2
(Northern Ireland)	Gary Elliott	4
(Belgium)	Ronny Huybrechts	1
(Austria)	Rowby-John Rodriguez	4
(Germany)	Daniel Zygla	3
(India)	Sarthak Patel	1
(Norway)	Vegar Elvevoll	4
(South Africa)	Shawn Hogan	4
(Latvia)	Arnis Gerners	0
(Japan)	Tsukuda Kengo	3
(Sweden)	Daniel Larsson	4
(United States)	Jim Widmayer	4
(Canada)	Dion Laviolette	1
(Wales)	Kevin Thomas	2
(Finland)	Jarkko Komula	4
(Australia)	Damon Heta	2
(United States)	Scott Wollaston	4
(Spain)	José de Sousa	0
(Scotland)	Craig Baxter	4
(Denmark)	Vladimir Andersen	4
(Belgium)	Didier De Vuyst	0
(Germany)	Marko Puls	4
(Norway)	Robert Hansen	1
(Finland)	Sami Sanssi	2
(Netherlands)	Ron Meulenkamp	4
(Lithuania)	Arūnas Čiplys	3
(Italy)	Luca Catallo	4
(Catalonia)	Antonio Muñoz Ramos	4
(Barbados)	Anthony Forde	1
(Switzerland)	Tobias Anliker	2
(Wales)	Jamie Lewis	4
(Japan)	Hiroaki Shimizu	4
(Romania)	László Kádár	2
(Wales)	Martin Phillips	4
(Denmark)	Glenn Honore	0
(South Africa)	Charl Pietersen	4
(United States)	Jerry van Loan	2
(Norway)	Robert Wagner	2
(Australia)	Peter Machin	4
(Lithuania)	Gintaras Nagevicius	1
(Latvia)	Guntars Grebskis	4
(England)	Scott Waites	4
(Finland)	Petri Korte	2
(Netherlands)	Salmon Renyaan	4
(Switzerland)	Willy Kolli	0
(Sweden)	Dennis Nilsson	4
(Canada)	Terry Hayhurst	1
(Germany)	Olaf Tupuschis	4
(Italy)	Danilo Vigato	1
(Austria)	Franz Thaler	1
(Australia)	Mick Mullaney	4
(Belgium)	Geert De Vos	4
(Canada)	David Cameron	1
(Iceland)	Kristjan Torsteinsson	0
(United States)	Larry Butler	4
(Wales)	Wayne Warren	4
(Isle of Man)	Colin Tyrer	1
(Luxembourg)	Roland Weis	1
(Japan)	Goto Takuya	4
(Denmark)	Frede Johansen	3
(Republic of Ireland)	Connie Finnan	4
(Iran)	Amir Beiranvand	0
(Netherlands)	Jan Dekker	4

Third round
(England)	Martin Adams	4
(Northern Ireland)	Gary Elliott	1
(Austria)	Rowby-John Rodriguez	4
(Norway)	Vegar Elvevoll	3
(South Africa)	Shawn Hogan	0
(Sweden)	Daniel Larsson	4
(United States)	Jim Widmayer	0
(Finland)	Jarkko Komula	4
(United States)	Scott Wollaston	1
(Scotland)	Craig Baxter	4
(Denmark)	Vladimir Andersen	4
(Germany)	Marko Puls	3
(Netherlands)	Ron Meulenkamp	4
(Italy)	Luca Catallo	3
(Catalonia)	Antonio Muñoz Ramos	1
(Wales)	Jamie Lewis	4
(Japan)	Hiroaki Shimizu	1
(Wales)	Martin Phillips	4
(South Africa)	Charl Pietersen	2
(Australia)	Peter Machin	4
(Latvia)	Guntars Grebskis	0
(England)	Scott Waites	4
(Netherlands)	Salmon Renyaan	1
(Sweden)	Dennis Nilsson	4
(Germany)	Olaf Tupuschis	4
(Australia)	Mick Mullaney	2
(Belgium)	Geert De Vos	4
(United States)	Larry Butler	3
(Wales)	Wayne Warren	4
(Japan)	Goto Takuya	1
(Republic of Ireland)	Connie Finnan	4
(Netherlands)	Jan Dekker	0

Fourth round
(England)	Martin Adams	4
(Austria)	Rowby-John Rodriguez	1
(Sweden)	Daniel Larsson	4
(Finland)	Jarkko Komula	3
(Scotland)	Craig Baxter	3
(Denmark)	Vladimir Andersen	4
(Netherlands)	Ron Meulenkamp	1
(Wales)	Jamie Lewis	4
(Wales)	Martin Phillips	4
(Australia)	Peter Machin	2
(England)	Scott Waites	4
(Sweden)	Dennis Nilsson	0
(Germany)	Olaf Tupuschis	3
(Belgium)	Geert De Vos	4
(Wales)	Wayne Warren	4
(Republic of Ireland)	Connie Finnan	0

Quarter-finals
(England)	Martin Adams	5
(Sweden)	Daniel Larsson	0
(Denmark)	Vladimir Andersen	2
(Wales)	Jamie Lewis	5
(Wales)	Martin Phillips	4
(England)	Scott Waites	5
(Belgium)	Geert De Vos	2
(Wales)	Wayne Warren	5

Semi-finals
(England)	Martin Adams	6
(Wales)	Jamie Lewis	3
(England)	Scott Waites	6
(Wales)	Wayne Warren	4

Final
(England)	Martin Adams	3
(England)	Scott Waites	7

== Women's singles ==
Last 16 onwards. Full results - https://web.archive.org/web/20120324192432/http://dartswdf.com/WC2011/WDFWorldCup2011WomensSingles.pdf

Third round
(Japan)	Mayumi Ouchi	4
(Republic of Ireland)	Angela De Ward	3
(Finland)	Kirsi Viinikainen	4
(Germany)	Marene Westermann	2
(Switzerland)	Andrea Kaelin	0
(Canada)	Jenelle Legge	4
(Wales)	Rhian Edwards	3
(England)	Trina Gulliver	4
(England)	Deta Hedman	4
(Germany)	Heike Jenkins	2
(Belgium)	Sylvie Storez	0
(Netherlands)	Karin Krappen	4
(Republic of Ireland)	Olive McIntyre	4
(Northern Ireland)	Jackie O'Neill	1
(Canada)	Cindy Hayhurst	1
(Wales)	Julie Gore	4

Quarter-finals
(Japan)	Mayumi Ouchi	1
(Finland)	Kirsi Viinikainen	5
(Canada)	Jenelle Legge	2
(England)	Trina Gulliver	5
(England)	Deta Hedman	5
(Netherlands)	Karin Krappen	0
(Republic of Ireland)	Olive McIntyre	0
(Wales)	Julie Gore	5

Semi-finals
(Finland)	Kirsi Viinikainen	3
(England)	Trina Gulliver	6
(England)	Deta Hedman	5
(Wales)	Julie Gore	6

Final
(England)	Trina Gulliver	7
(Wales)	Julie Gore	6

== Men's team ==
Quarter Finals onwards

Quarter-finals
(England)	England	9
(Canada)	Canada	6
(Australia)	Australia	6
(Sweden)	Sweden	9
(Denmark)	Denmark	7
(Finland)	Finland	9
(South Africa)	South Africa	6
(Belgium)	Belgium	9

Semi-finals
(England)	England	9
(Sweden)	Sweden	5
(Finland)	Finland	9
(Belgium)	Belgium	6

Final
(England)	England	9
(Finland)	Finland	8

== Men's Pairs ==
Quarter Finals onwards. Full results - https://web.archive.org/web/20120324192422/http://dartswdf.com/WC2011/WDFWorldCup2011MensPairs.pdf

Quarter-finals
(Wales)	Jamie Lewis; Kevin Thomas	2
(Finland)	Ulf Ceder; Jarkko Komula	4
(South Africa)	Shawn Hogan; Charl Pietersen	2
(England)	Martin Adams; Tony O'Shea	4
(Finland)	Sami Sanssi; Petri Korte	2
(Sweden)	Johan Engström; Daniel Larsson	4
(Scotland)	Ross Montgomery; Ewan Hyslop	4
(Isle of Man)	Colin Tyrer; Robbie Nelson	2

Semi-finals
(Finland)	Ulf Ceder; Jarkko Komula	1
(England)	Martin Adams; Tony O'Shea	5
(Sweden)	Johan Engström; Daniel Larsson	5
(Scotland)	Ross Montgomery; Ewan Hyslop	3

Final
(England)	Martin Adams; Tony O'Shea	6
(Sweden)	Johan Engström; Daniel Larsson	4

== Women's Pairs ==
Quarter Finals onwards.

Quarter-finals
(England)	Trina Gulliver; Deta Hedman	4
(Sweden)	Anna Forsmark; Maud Jansson	1
(United States)	Cali West; Brenda Roush	1
(Finland)	Lumi Silvan; Kirsi Viinikainen	4
(Wales)	Julie Gore; Rhian Edwards	4
(Japan)	Ohkubo Ayumi; Ouchi Mayumi	3
(Norway)	Rachna David; Tone Eriksen Wagner	1
(Netherlands)	Karin Krappen; Francis Hoenselaar	4

Semi-finals
(England)	Trina Gulliver; Deta Hedman	5
(Finland)	Lumi Silvan; Kirsi Viinikainen	3
(Wales)	Julie Gore; Rhian Edwards	2
(Netherlands)	Karin Krappen; Francis Hoenselaar	5

Final
(England)	Trina Gulliver; Deta Hedman	6
(Netherlands)	Karin Krappen; Francis Hoenselaar	5

== Youth Winners ==
Event	Winner	Score	Runner-up
Youth Singles - Boys	(Netherlands) Jimmy Hendriks	6-4	(Germany) Max Hopp
Youth Singles - Girls	(England) Fallon Sherrock	6-0	(South Africa) Courtney Mulder
Youth Pairs	(England) Jake Jones; Fallon Sherrock	6-3	(Germany) Max Hopp; Ann-Kathrin Wigmann

== Final Points Tables ==
=== Men ===
Ranking	Team	Points
1	England	157
2	Finland	85
3	Sweden	74
4	Wales	63
5	Belgium	47

=== Women ===
Ranking	Team	Points
1	England	65
2	Wales	34
3	Netherlands	30
4	Finland	27
5	Japan	20

=== Youth ===
Ranking	Team	Points
1	England	74
2	Germany	56
3	Netherlands	42
4	Australia	35
4	Finland	35
