= Göran Klemme =

Swedish darts player

Personal information
- Full name: Goran Klemme
- Born: 7 July 1964 (age 62) Stockholm, Sweden
- Home town: Stockholm, Sweden

Sport
- Sport: Darts
- Playing since: 1984
- Darts: 23g
- Laterality: Right-handed
- Walk-on music: "Down Down" by Status Quo

Organisation (see split in darts)
- BDO: 1993–2011
- WDF: 1993–2011

WDF major events – best performances
- World Championship: Last 32: 2007
- World Masters: Runner Up: 2005
- World Trophy: Last 32: 2006
- Int. Darts League: Preliminary round: 2007

Other tournament wins
- Tournament: Years
- Scottish Open Sweden National Championships Swedish Open: 2006; 2006 2010

Göran Klemme (born 7 July 1964) is a former Swedish professional darts player who played in British Darts Organisation (BDO) events.

== Career ==
Klemme made his name in the 2005 Winmau World Masters. He defeated Bobby George, Gary Robson and John Walton on the way to the final, where he played reigning BDO world champion Raymond van Barneveld. Klemme took the first three sets, but ultimately lost the final by 7 sets to 3.

Klemme qualified for the 2007 BDO World Darts Championship, but was beaten 3 sets to 0 by Mike Veitch in the first round. After a preliminary round exit from the 2007 International Darts League, he took a break from darts.

He returned to darts in 2010, beating Finland's Veijo Viinikka to win the Swedish Open.

== World Championship results ==
=== BDO ===
- 2007: 1st Round (lost to Mike Veitch 0–3) (sets)
