= Deta Hedman =

English darts player (born 1959)

Deta Hedman OBE
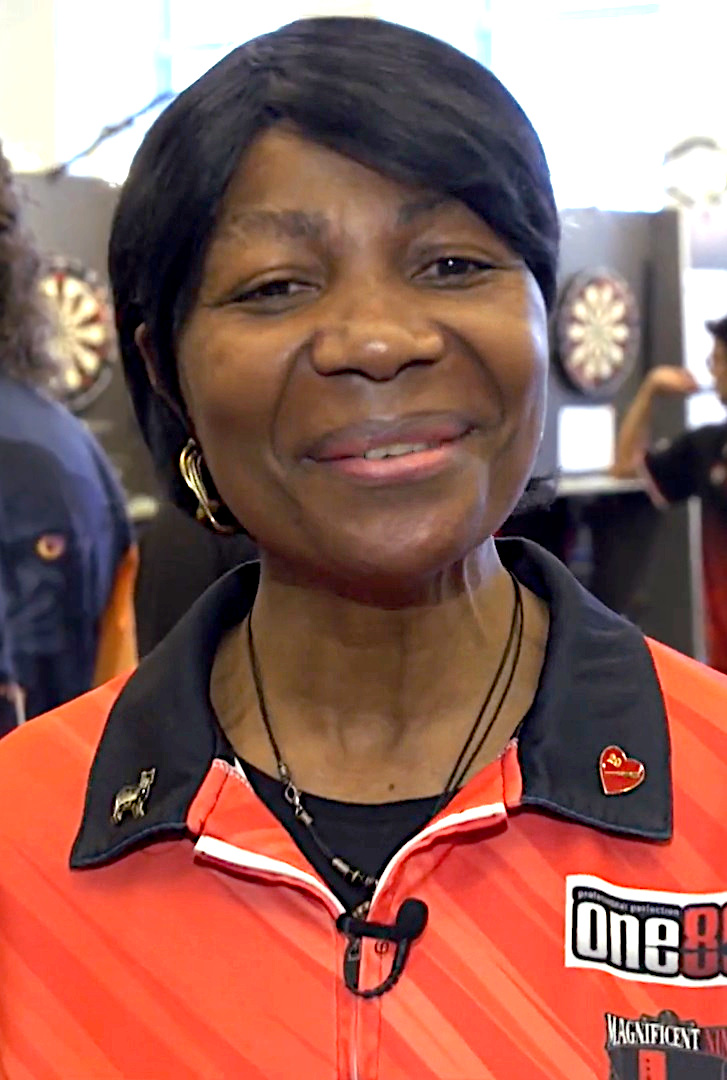
- Hedman in 2021

Personal information
- Nicknames: "Caribbean Queen" "The Heart of Darts"
- Born: 14 November 1959 (age 66) St Thomas, Jamaica
- Home town: Witham, Essex, England

Sport
- Sport: Darts
- Playing since: 1980s
- Darts: 27g One80 Signature
- Laterality: Right-handed
- Walk-on music: "Hot Hot Hot" by Buster Poindexter

Organisation (see split in darts)
- BDO: 1989–1996, 2010–2020
- PDC: 2002–2007, 2019–
- WDF: 1994–1996, 2010–
- Current world ranking: (WDF W) 1 (17 August 2026)

WDF major events – best performances
- World Championship: Winner (1): 2025
- World Masters: Winner (2): 1994, 2013
- World Trophy: Runner-up: 2016
- Finder Masters: Winner (2): 1996, 2011
- Dutch Open: Winner (3): 2010, 2017, 2018

PDC premier events – best performances
- World Championship: (Women's) Quarter-final: 2010 (Mixed gender) Last 96: 2021
- UK Open: Last 64: 2005
- Desert Classic: (Women's) Winner: 2002

WSDT major events – best performances
- World Championship: Last 24: 2022
- World Matchplay: Last 16: 2022
- World Masters: Last 16: 2022

Other tournament wins
- Years
PDC Women's Series	2020, 2026
Medal record
Women's Darts
Representing England
WDF World Cup
Gold medal – first place	1995 Basel	Women's pairs
Gold medal – first place	1995 Basel	Women's overall
Gold medal – first place	2011 Castlebar	Women's pairs
Gold medal – first place	2011 Castlebar	Women's overall
Gold medal – first place	2013 St. John's	Women's singles
Gold medal – first place	2013 St. John's	Women's pairs
Gold medal – first place	2013 St. John's	Women's overall
Gold medal – first place	2015 Antalya	Women's team
Gold medal – first place	2015 Antalya	Women's overall
Gold medal – first place	2019 Cluj	Women's team
Gold medal – first place	2019 Cluj	Women's overall
Gold medal – first place	2023 Esbjerg	Women's pairs
Silver medal – second place	2015 Antalya	Women's singles
Silver medal – second place	2015 Antalya	Women's pairs
Silver medal – second place	2019 Cluj	Women's singles
Bronze medal – third place	1995 Basel	Women's singles
Bronze medal – third place	2011 Castlebar	Women's singles
WDF Europe Cup
Gold medal – first place	1994 Stockholm	Women's singles
Gold medal – first place	1994 Stockholm	Women's pairs
Gold medal – first place	1994 Stockholm	Women's overall
Gold medal – first place	1996 Bundoran	Women's pairs
Gold medal – first place	1996 Bundoran	Women's overall
Gold medal – first place	2014 Bucharest	Women's team
Gold medal – first place	2014 Bucharest	Women's overall
Gold medal – first place	2016 Egmond aan Zee	Women's team
Gold medal – first place	2016 Egmond aan Zee	Women's overall
Gold medal – first place	2018 Budapest	Women's pairs
Gold medal – first place	2018 Budapest	Women's team
Gold medal – first place	2018 Budapest	Women's overall
Gold medal – first place	2022 Gandía	Women's pairs
Gold medal – first place	2022 Gandía	Women's team
Gold medal – first place	2022 Gandía	Women's overall
Silver medal – second place	1996 Bundoran	Women's singles
Silver medal – second place	2014 Bucharest	Women's singles
Silver medal – second place	2016 Egmond aan Zee	Women's pairs
Bronze medal – third place	2012 Kemer	Women's pairs
Bronze medal – third place	2014 Bucharest	Women's pairs

Deta Hedman (born 14 November 1959) is a British-Jamaican darts player who competes both in World Darts Federation (WDF) and Professional Darts Corporation (PDC) events and previously competed in British Darts Organisation (BDO) events. She is the reigning WDF women's world champion, having won the 2025 WDF World Championship. She is a two-time World Masters and Finder Masters champion and a three-time Dutch Open champion. She is also a three-time BDO World Championship finalist.

Hedman began playing BDO events in 1987 and reached her first BDO women’s major final at the World Masters in 1990. She won the event in both 1994 and 2013.

== Early life ==
Hedman was born in Jamaica in 1959. Her parents emigrated to the United Kingdom in the early 1960s, leaving Hedman and her siblings in the care of relatives in Jamaica. She spent her childhood with her aunt in Castleton in a shack without running water or electricity, going to school from Monday to Thursday and working on the farm on Fridays. Her parents eventually settled in Witham, Essex and over time, brought their children to the UK, with Hedman joining them in January 1973. She started playing darts with her older brother after babysitting for him and then at the local pub in Witham and further afield in Essex. When she was 25, she joined a super league. She was selected for the county, and in 1987 she began playing in British Darts Organisation (BDO) events.

== Career ==
Hedman reached the Women's World Masters final for the first time in 1990, losing to Rhian Speed. She beat defending champion Mandy Solomons to win the Women's World Masters in 1994. When she retired from darts in 1997 due to work commitments, she had been Women's World Number 1 since 1994.

Hedman returned to darts in 2002 with the Professional Darts Corporation. She qualified for the UK Open in 2004, and more famously in 2005, when she defeated Aaron Turner and Norman Fletcher before losing to Wayne Atwood in the last 64. Her win over Turner was the first time that a female darts player had beaten a male player in a televised major.

Due to work commitments, Hedman retired again in 2007 but returned to the BDO in 2009. After winning numerous open titles in 2009, she qualified for the BDO Women's World Championship for the first time in 2010. She defeated Irina Armstrong 2–0 in the quarter-finals, but was beaten 2–0 by eventual champion Trina Gulliver in the semi-finals. Hedman won the 2010 BDO Classic tournament beating Karen Lawman 3-2 in the final.

Hedman also competed in the first PDC Women's World Darts Championship in 2010, but lost to Fiona Carmichael in the quarter-finals.

At the 2011 BDO World Darts Championship, Hedman defeated Patricia De Peuter 2–1 in the quarter-finals before being whitewashed 2–0 by Rhian Edwards in the semi-finals.

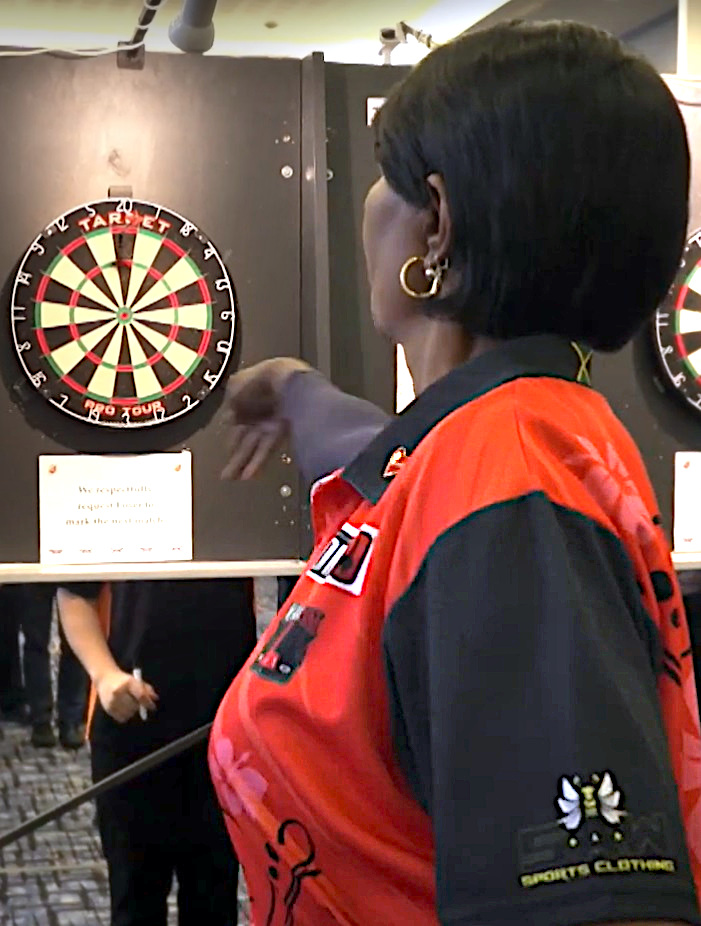
Deta Hedman at the Czech Open Darts, 2021

Hedman's best run at the BDO World Darts Championship came in 2012, where she beat Rhian Edwards and Lorraine Farlam to reach the final. In the final, she led Anastasia Dobromyslova by a set and threw for the championship, but was broken and ultimately lost 2–1. This was equalled by her 2016 run where she lost in the final to Gulliver.

Despite being ranked No.1 for the 2013 BDO World Darts Championship Hedman was knocked out in the first round 0–2 by Lisa Ashton. The following season, Hedman won 14 titles and once again reached the world final, but lost once again this time from 2–0 in sets and 2–1 in legs having again thrown for the title. Hedman lost the final 3–2 to Lisa Ashton despite having a checkout percentage over 75%.

Hedman reached the final of the 2016 BDO World Darts Championship but was beaten by Gulliver who won her 10th title.

She competed at 2020 PDC Q-School but failed to gain a PDC Tour Card. In October 2020, the PDC held the inaugural Women's Series, a set of four events with two qualifying spots for the 2021 PDC World Darts Championship. She tied with Fallon Sherrock on the Order of Merit, however Hedman won beating Sherrock 85–83 on legs won, meaning Hedman would make her debut in the 2021 PDC World Darts Championship. She lost 3–1 to Andy Boulton in the first round.

At the 2025 WDF World Darts Championship, Hedman competed in her fourth women's world final and won her first world title, defeating Lerena Rietbergen 4–1 in the final.

== Awards ==
Hedman was on the list of the BBC's 100 Women announced on 23 November 2020.

In June 2025, Hedman was appointed an Officer of the Order of the British Empire (OBE) in the 2025 Birthday Honours for services to darts and charity.

== Personal life ==
Hedman's brother Rudi was a professional footballer who played for Colchester United and Crystal Palace. Her other brother, Al, was a professional darts player and former 1995 BDO British Open Champion. Her nephew Graham is a 400-metre runner.

In a post on Facebook in December 2023, Hedman voiced support for banning transgender players from playing in women's events. During the WDF Denmark Women's Open in May 2024, she withdrew in the quarter-finals against transgender player Noa-Lynn van Leuven, leading to speculation that she withdrew from the tournament in protest. Speaking to Deutsche Welle, Hedman cited issues relating to skeletal difference and menstrual cycles as justification for her stance. In October 2025, Hedman forfeited her quarter-final match against Van Leuven in event 22 of the 2025 PDC Women's Series.

== World Championship results ==
=== PDC World Championship ===
- 2010 (women's): Quarter-finals (lost to Fiona Carmichael 2–4)
- 2021: First round (lost to Andy Boulton 1–3)

=== BDO World Championship ===
- 2010: Semi-finals (lost to Trina Gulliver 0–2)
- 2011: Semi-finals (lost to Rhian Edwards 0–2)
- 2012: Runner-up (lost to Anastasia Dobromyslova 1–2)
- 2013: Quarter-finals (lost to Lisa Ashton 0–2)
- 2014: Runner-up (lost to Lisa Ashton 2–3)
- 2015: First round (lost to Lisa Ashton 1–2)
- 2016: Runner-up (lost to Trina Gulliver 2–3)
- 2017: First round (lost to Casey Gallagher 1–2)
- 2018: Semi-finals (lost to Lisa Ashton 0–2)
- 2019: First round (lost to Maria O'Brien 0–2)
- 2020: First round (lost to Laura Turner 0–2)

=== WDF World Championship ===
- 2022: Second round (lost to Tori Kewish 0-2)
- 2023: Quarter-finals (lost to Rhian O'Sullivan 0–2)
- 2024: Semi-finals (lost to Beau Greaves 0–3)
- 2025: Winner (beat Lerena Rietbergen 4–1)

=== World Seniors Championship ===
- 2022: First round (lost to Peter Manley 1–3)
- 2024: First round (lost to Martin Adams 2–3)

The 2010 PDC World Championship was scored in legs but all the other scores were sets.

== Performance timeline ==
Deta Hedman's performance timeline is as follows:

=== BDO ===
Tournament	1990	1994	2010	2011	2012	2013	2014	2015	2016	2017	2018	2019	2020
BDO Ranked televised events
World Championship	NH		SF	SF	F	QF	F	1R	F	1R	SF	1R	1R
World Masters	F	W	L16		F	W	L64	SF	F	QF	SF	QF	NH
Finder Masters	NH		SF	W	RR	RR	RR	RR	RR	F	RR	NH	

=== WDF ===
Tournament	2022	2023	2024	2025
WDF Major/platinum events
World Championship	2R	QF	SF	W
World Masters	3R	NH		SF

Performance Table Legend
W	Won the tournament	F	Finalist	SF	Semifinalist	QF	Quarterfinalist	#R; RR; L#	Lost in # round Round-robin; Last # stage	DQ	Disqualified
DNQ	Did not qualify	DNP	Did not participate	WD	Withdrew	NH	Tournament not held	#R; RR; L#	Lost in # round Round-robin; Last # stage	NYF	Not yet founded

== Titles ==
=== WDF titles ===
- WDF World Cup
  - Singles: 2013
  - Doubles (4): 1995 (with Mandy Solomons), 2011, 2013 (each with Trina Gulliver), 2023 (with Beau Greaves)
  - Teams (2): 2015 (with Lisa Ashton, Fallon Sherrock and Claire Brookin), 2019 (with Lorraine Winstanley, Sherrock and Maria O'Brien)
  - Overall standings (6): 1995, 2011, 2013, 2015, 2019, 2023
- WDF Europe Cup
  - Singles: 1994
  - Doubles (4): 1994 (with Tammy Montgomery), 1996 (with Mandy Solomons), 2018 (with Maria O'Brien), 2022 (with Beau Greaves)
  - Teams: (4) 2014 (with Lisa Ashton, Lorraine Winstanley and Trina Gulliver), 2016 (with Winstanley, Gulliver and Fallon Sherrock), 2018 (with Winstanley, Sherrock and Maria O'Brien), 2022 (with Winstanley, Claire Brookin and Greaves)
  - Overall standings (6): 1994, 1996, 2014, 2016, 2018, 2022
- Platinum tournaments (majors)
  - Dutch Open (3): 2010, 2017, 2018
  - German Open (4): 2011, 2012, 2013, 2017
  - German Masters (3): 2014, 2015, 2017
  - WDF World Darts Championship: 2025
- Gold Tournaments (Category 1)
  - Denmark Open (7): 1994, 1995, 2014, 2016, 2017, 2022, 2026
  - Northern Ireland Open: (4) 2010 2, 2013 2, 2015, 2016
  - Police Masters (6): 2011, 2012, 2013, 2015, 2016, 2019
  - Polish Open (6): 2011, 2012, 2013, 2015, 2016, 2018
  - England Open (3): 2013, 2016, 2021
  - Hal Masters: 2015
  - Las Vegas Open (2): 2025, 2026
  - Toronto Area Open (2): 2025, 2026

Silver Tournaments (Category 2)

  - Swiss Open (7): 1989, 1991, 1992, 1996, 2012 3, 2016, 2019
  - Antwerp Open (5): 1993, 2010, 2015, 2017 1, 2023
  - French Open (5): 1994, 1995, 2014 3, 2016, 2019
  - Scottish Open (7): 1995, 1997, 2012 1, 2013, 2015, 2022, 2023
  - England Classic: (4) 2010, 2012, 2013, 2024
  - Czech Open (3): 2011, 2013, 2021
  - Denmark Masters: 2014, 2016, 2018, 2021
  - Hungarian Masters (3): 2016, 2019, 2021
  - Romanian Classic (2): 2018, 2024
  - Irish Classic: 2021
  - Las Vegas Classic: 2026
  - Romanian Open (3): 2020, 2024, 2026
  - Toronto Area Classic (2): 2025, 2026
- Bronze Tournaments (Category 3)
  - Finnish Open (5): 1989, 1991, 1992, 1996, 2010
  - Swedish Open (5): 1990, 1991, 1992, 1995, 2010
  - Luxembourg Open (3): 2015 2, 2016, 2018
  - Hungarian Classic: (4) 2016, 2017, 2019, 2021
  - Italian Grand Masters: 2017
  - Malta Open (2): 2017, 2018
  - Isle of Man Masters: 2025
  - England Selsey Open: 2026
- Other
  - Isle of Man Open (6): 1990, 1991, 1992, 1996, 2011, 2017
  - Norway Open (2): 1992, 1994
  - Berlin Open (2): 1993, 1994
  - Australian Grand Masters: 1994
  - Jersey Festival of Darts: 1994
  - Pacific Masters: 1994
  - Granite City Open (6): 2009, 2012, 2013, 2014, 2015, 2017
  - Sunpark's Masters (2): 2009, 2011
  - Turkish Classic (2): 2009, 2015
  - England Masters (3): 2010 2, 2016, 2017
  - Mariflex Open (3): 2010, 2012, 2013
  - Vantaa Sunday
    - Singles 2010
  - Greenpoint Masters: 2011
  - Poznan Open: 2011
  - Welsh Classic: 2013
  - Hal Open: 2014
  - Munsterland Trophy: 2014
  - Scottish Classic: 2015
  - Isle of Man Classic: 2016
  - Jersey Classic (2): 2016, 2017
  - Masters of Waregem: 2016
  - Antwerp Masters: 2017
  - Belgium Masters: 2017
  - Bruges Open: 2017
  - Helvetia Open: 2017
  - Vizcaya Open: 2017
  - Welsh Masters: 2017
  - Welsh Open (7): 1993, 1994, 2011, 2012, 2016, 2018, 2026
  - Luxembourg Masters: 2018
  - French Open: 2019
  - West Fries Masters: 2019
