= Claire Brookin =

English darts player

Personal information
- Full name: Claire Brookin
- Born: England

Sport
- Sport: Darts
- Playing since: 2008
- Darts: 23 Gram
- Laterality: Right-handed
- Walk-on music: "Tsunami" by Tinie Tempah

Organisation (see split in darts)
- BDO: 2012–2020
- WDF: 2022–

WDF major events – best performances
- World Championship: Last 16: 2017
- World Masters: Quarter Finals: 2012, 2015

Other tournament wins
- Years
Women's British Classic	2016
Women's Cambridgeshire Open	2015

Claire Brookin is an English professional darts player who played in British Darts Organisation (BDO) events.

== Darts career ==
Brookin made her international debut for England in 2012, winning gold medals at the 2015 WDF World Cup and 2022 WDF Europe Cup. Brookin reached the quarter-finals of the World Masters in 2012 and 2015. She won the Cambridgeshire Open in 2015 and won the British Classic in 2016. She qualified for the 2017 BDO World Darts Championship, and faced the defending champion Trina Gulliver in the last 16, where she lost 2–0.

== World Championship results ==
=== BDO ===
- 2017: Last 16 (lost to Trina Gulliver 0–2)
