= Stefan Nagy =

Swedish darts player

Personal information
- Born: 31 July 1951 Stockholm Sweden
- Died: 22 June 2016 (aged 64)
- Home town: Enkoping, Sweden

Sport
- Sport: Darts
- Playing since: 1981
- Laterality: Right-handed
- Walk-on music: It Feels So Good by Sonique

Organisation (see split in darts)
- BDO: 1990–2006
- Current world ranking: –

WDF major events – best performances
- World Championship: Last 16: 2002
- World Masters: Quarter Final: 1996
- World Trophy: Last 32: 2002

Other tournament wins
- Tournament: Years
- Viking Masters Swedish Open: 1995, 1996; 2001

Stefan Nagy (31 July 1951 – 22 June 2016) was a former Swedish darts player who competed in British Darts Organisation events.

== Career ==
At the 1992 BDO World Darts Championship he was defeated 3–0 by Rod Harrington in the first round. 2002 saw Nagy's return to Lakeside, where he beat Gary Anderson in the first round 3-0 but lost in the last 16 to Wayne Mardle. He made his third and final appearance in 2003 where he lost in the first round to Andy Fordham.

== Injury ==
Nagy's last tournament was the 2006 Finnish Open. Stefan Nagy had an accident with an electric motorbike in the summer of 2006 which left him paralyzed for six months (he broke his neck). He subsequently recovered sufficiently to be able to walk, but he was never able to play darts again due to his handicap.

== Death ==
Nagy died of cancer on 22 June 2016.

== World Championship results ==
=== BDO ===
- 1992: 1st round (lost to Rod Harrington 0–3)
- 2002: 2nd round (lost to Wayne Mardle 1–3)
- 2003: 1st round (lost to Andy Fordham 0–3)
