= Peter Machin (darts player) =

Australian darts player

Personal information
- Nickname: "Machie"
- Born: 30 August 1973 (age 53) Adelaide, Australia

Sport
- Sport: Darts
- Playing since: 1983
- Darts: 23g One80 Signature
- Laterality: Right-handed
- Walk-on music: "Earthquake" by Labrinth ft. Tinie Tempah

Organisation (see split in darts)
- BDO: 2005–2020
- PDC: 2021–
- WDF: 2005–
- Current world ranking: (WDF) NR (17 August 2026)

WDF major events – best performances
- World Championship: Quarter Final: 2024
- World Masters: Last 136: 2008
- World Trophy: Winner (1): 2017

PDC premier events – best performances
- Grand Slam: Group Stage: 2017

Other tournament wins
- Years
Australian Grand Masters	2015, 2017, 2018
Murray Bridge Grand Prix	2016, 2019, 2022
NDDA Open	2010
Pacific Masters	2015, 2018, 2019
South Australian Open	2015
Van Diemen Classic	2014, 2022
West Coast Classic	2020
Medal record
Men's Darts
Representing Australia
WDF Asia-Pacific Cup
Gold medal – first place	2008 Palmertson	Men's singles
Gold medal – first place	2008 Palmertson	Team event
Gold medal – first place	2012 Darwin	Team event
Gold medal – first place	2016 Osaka	Team event
Silver medal – second place	2014 Hong Kong	Men's pairs
Silver medal – second place	2016 Osaka	Men's singles
Bronze medal – third place	2008 Palmertson	Men's pairs
Bronze medal – third place	2014 Hong Kong	Team event
Bronze medal – third place	2016 Osaka	Men's pairs
Bronze medal – third place	2018 Seoul	Men's pairs
Bronze medal – third place	2018 Seoul	Team event

Peter Machin (born 30 August 1973) is an Australian professional darts player.

== Career ==
Machin started to play darts when he was ten years old; his father Brian was also a darts player. When he was 14, Machin played on stage in the inaugural Australian Youth Masters where he reached the final. In 2001, he played as a senior for South Australia for the first time. In 2008, he was nominated for the national team and took part in the WDF Asia-Pacific Cup. He won the singles and was part of the winning Australian team.

Since 2011, Machin is a permanent member of the national team and took part in several World Cups. In 2015, he won the Pacific Masters and the Australian Grand Masters. In 2016, he took part in the BDO World Trophy and reached the final where he lost to Darryl Fitton. In 2017, he again reached the final at the BDO World Trophy. This time, he won the title by beating Martin Phillips in the final. As a result, he made his Grand Slam debut at the 2017 edition.

At the 2023 WDF World Darts Championship, Machin missed double 12 for a nine-dart finish.

== Personal life ==
Machin's wife Debbie is also a darts player.

In 2014, Machin trained to be a darts coach.

== World Championship results ==
=== WDF ===
- 2023: Second round: (lost to James Richardson 0–3)
- 2024: Quarter-finals: (lost to Shane McGuirk 0–4)
