= Eric Burden =

Personal information
- Born: 15 July 1945 (age 81) Pont-Henri, Wales

Sport
- Sport: Darts
- Playing since: 1963
- Darts: 20g
- Laterality: Right-handed
- Walk-on music: "U Can't Touch This" by MC Hammer

Organisation (see split in darts)
- BDO: 1984–1999

WDF major events – best performances
- World Championship: Last 32: 1989, 1991, 1994, 1996
- World Masters: Last 32: 1985, 1993, 1994

Other tournament wins
- Tournament: Years
- Swedish Open WDF Europe Cup Pairs: 1994; 1994
- Updated on 1 September 2021

Eric Burden is a Welsh former professional darts player who competed in the 1980s and 1990s.

== Career ==
Burden played in the BDO World Darts Championship four times and lost in the first round each time. He lost in 1989 to Russell Stewart, in 1991 to Bob Sinnaeve, in 1994 to Leo Laurens and in 1996 to Per Skau. Burden also played in the Winmau World Masters three times, again losing in the first round each time. In 1985, he lost to Tony Payne, in 1993 to George Dalgleish and in 1994 to Les Wallace. Despite his poor record on televised majors, Burden fared better on floor events, reaching the final of the 1990 WDF Europe Cup, losing to Phil Taylor and the 1995 WDF World Cup, losing to Martin Adams. Burden won the 1994 Swedish Open, beating local player Magnus Caris in the final.

Burden also appeared on the popular British game show, "Bullseye" scoring 207 in 1993.

Burden quit the BDO in 1999.

== World Championship Performances ==
=== BDO ===
- 1989: 1st Round (lost to Russell Stewart 1–3) (sets)
- 1991: 1st Round (lost to Bob Sinnaeve 2–3)
- 1994: 1st Round (lost to Leo Laurens 0–3)
- 1996: 1st Round (lost to Per Skau 0–3)

=== WDF major finals: 1 (1 runner-up) ===
Legend
Europe Cup (0–1)

Outcome	No.	Year	Championship	Opponent in the final	Score
Runner-up	1.	1990	Europe Cup Singles	(England) Phil Taylor	3–4 (l)
