= Kevin Kenny =

English darts player

Personal information
- Born: 3 April 1961 (age 65) Liverpool, Merseyside, England

Sport
- Sport: Darts
- Playing since: 1978
- Darts: 18g
- Laterality: Right-handed

Organisation (see split in darts)
- BDO: 1982–1994

WDF major events – best performances
- World Championship: Semi-final: 1991, 1992
- World Masters: Quarter-final: 1993

Other tournament wins
- Tournament: Years
- Welsh Open WDC World Cup Team WDF Europe Cup Team WDF Europe Cup Overall: 1990; 1993; 1994; 1994

Kevin Kenny (born 3 April 1961) is an English former professional darts player who played for England and Merseyside.

== Career ==
Kenny received 12 caps for England, winning 11 times, and 116 caps for Merseyside, winning 92. He was also a two time semi-finalist at the BDO World Darts Championships and a semi-finalist at the News of the World Darts Championship in 1983. Kenny also won the 1990 Welsh Open.

Kenny is remembered for his quarter-final match against Jocky Wilson in the 1991 BDO World Darts Championship. Jocky was a former World Champion, winning it in 1982 and 1989, and this was only Kenny's second appearance at the Lakeside. However, the match went to 3 sets all, 5 legs all, with Kenny winning the deciding leg. He also hit a 170 finish in that final set, to achieve the highest checkout of the tournament.

Kenny also could have played for Scotland as his mother was born there, and with the home internationals only days away, his mind was on Scotland until he got the call from the English squad.

After the big split in darts when the PDC was formed, Kenny stayed with the BDO and went to Las Vegas to represent England in the WDF World Cup in 1993. At the time, he was a full international anyway, but it was doubtful whether he would have taken his place in the four-man team (home internationals had a team of 12, whereas the world cup was squads of 4). Kenny represented England 12 times, winning 11 of those matches. He retired from competitive darts in 1995 aged just 34, the age when most players are just reaching their peak.

Other notable achievements was twice being on the winning team in the Champions Cup, a darts event which yearly finds the best pub darts team in the land. The fact that he and teams from Liverpool won it twice was quite special due to the size of darts in the city at the time, compared to places with more darting pedigree like Lancashire, Yorkshire, and London. Secondly winning the county men's individual averages twice, a feat which at the time had only been equalled by five-time World Champion Eric Bristow (who became great friends with Kenny and also represented Merseyside with him as well).

Kenny quit the BDO in 1994.

== World Championship results ==
=== BDO ===
- 1987: 1st round (lost to Dave Lee 0–3)
- 1991: Semi-finals (lost to Eric Bristow 2–5)
- 1992: Semi-finals (lost to Mike Gregory 3–5)
- 1993: 1st round (lost to Kevin Spiolek 1–3)
- 1994: Quarter-finals (lost to Bobby George 2–4)
