= World Darts Federation =

Darts governing body and tournament organiser

- Abbreviation: WDF
- Formation: 1974; 52 years ago
- Type: Darts organisation
- Headquarters: Downey, California, USA
- Website: www.dartswdf.com

The World Darts Federation (WDF) is a sport governing body and (along with the PDC) a tournament organiser for the game of darts. It was formed in 1974 by representatives of the original fourteen founding members. Membership is open to the national organising body for darts in all nations. The WDF encourages the promotion of the sport of darts among and between those bodies, in an effort to gain international recognition for darts as a major sport. The WDF was a full member of Global Association of International Sports Federations, which was the governing body for international sports federations, until dissolution in 2023.

== Main events ==
The WDF stages a world championship (called the WDF World Cup), as well as continental championships such as the WDF Americas Cup, the WDF Asia-Pacific Cup and the WDF Europe Cup. The country that is first in the overall leader board (overall best result in the two events, singles, pairs, teams) becomes the world champion. Winners of any of the events can also call themselves the official World Champion. Winners of continental championships can call themselves the official champion of their own areas.

After the collapse of the British Darts Organisation in September 2020, the WDF announced plans to launch the WDF World Championship and WDF World Masters. Both competitions took place for the first time in 2022, starting with the 2022 WDF World Darts Championship in April.

== Members ==
80 national full members :

- Australia
- Austria
- Bahamas
- Bahrain
- Belgium
- Brunei
- Bulgaria
- Canada
- Catalonia
- Chinese Taipei
- Croatia
- Cyprus
- Czech Republic
- Denmark
- Egypt
- England
- Estonia
- Ethiopia
- Faroe Islands
- Finland
- France
- Germany
- Gibraltar
- Greece
- Guernsey
- Hong Kong
- Hungary
- Iceland
- India
- Iran
- Isle of Man
- Italy
- Jamaica
- Japan
- Jersey
- Kenya
- Latvia
- Liechtenstein
- Lithuania
- Luxembourg
- Macau
- Malaysia
- Malta
- Mauritania
- Monaco
- Mongolia
- Netherlands
- New Zealand
- Nigeria
- Northern Ireland
- Norway
- Pakistan
- Palestine
- Papua New Guinea
- Philippines
- Poland
- Republic of Ireland
- Romania
- Russia
- Scotland
- Serbia
- Singapore
- Slovakia
- Slovenia
- South Africa
- South Korea
- Spain
- Sweden
- Switzerland
- Thailand
- Trinidad & Tobago
- Tunisia
- Turkey
- Turks & Caicos
- Uganda
- Ukraine
- United Arab Emirates
- United States
- Wales
- Yemen

The WDF Rankings, as defined by the World Darts Federation, are the "objective merit-based method used for determining qualification for entry and seeding in all of its tournaments for both male and female singles, pairs and team". The rankings tables are "rolling tables", and points from an event are counted until that event occurs the following year. If a particular event does not occur in the following year, points are deleted after a calendar year.

== Tournament levels and points allocation ==
A player's WDF Ranking is based on the points they have accrued from their best 10 performances over the previous 12 month rolling period. The eligible tournaments include a selection of Platinum, Gold, Silver, and Bronze level tournaments with decreasing points at each level.

Since the formation of the WDF rankings in 1974 the method used to calculate a player's ranking points has changed several times. Notes: The WDF international tournaments have six categories for both men and women (singles, pairs and teams)

=== Current points distribution ===
Points are currently awarded as follows:

Tournament category	W	F	SF	QF	R16	R32	R64
WDF Platinum tournaments	270	167	103	64	39	26	13
WDF Gold tournaments	180	111	68	43	26	17	9
WDF Silver tournaments	90	56	34	21	13	9	
WDF Bronze tournaments	45	28	17	11	6		

== Current WDF World Rankings ==
The rankings are based on a cumulative points system similar to ATP rankings in tennis they are done on a rolling one year basis. When a tournament is played, the previous year's results are removed from the rankings. This list is used to determine seeds for some of the WDF Opens. The World Darts Federation also have a ranking system designed to provide a measure of the global activities of darts players in every WDF recognised darts event. It used to be very similar to the BDO system but was revised in January 2007 to include categories by country and by events, and the distribution of ranking points reflect the levels of prize money on offer and the numbers of entries in a tournament. Therefore, the WDF World Rankings give a better reflection on BDO player world ranking. The leading players gain points in different levels of categorised events and prize money and at the end of the season the leading players receive monetary bonus rewards from the WDF.

In 2025, in response to a motion put forth by England and seconded by Scotland and Wales, the WDF voted to implement an immediate ban on transgender women from competing as women. In accordance with the change in policy, the WDF renamed its "Men's" and "Boys'" events to "Open" and "Open Youth" events.

WDF Open World Rankings as of 17 August 2026.
Rank	Change	Player	Points
1	Steady	Mitchell Lawrie	988
2	▲1	Paul Krohne	850
3	▼1	Jenson Walker	757
4	▲1	Jeff Smith	597
5	▼1	Neil Duff	581
6	▲2	Leonard Gates	511
7	Steady	Corné Groeneveld	507
8	▼2	Jason Brandon	485
9	▲7	Stefan Schröder	480
10	▲3	Moreno Blom	473
11	Steady	James Beeton	459
12	Steady	Ben Robb	418
13	▲85	Chris Lim	416
14	▲14	András Borbély	416
15	▼5	Raymond Smith	412
16	▲1	Jarno Bottenberg	378
17	▼2	Daniel Zapata	372
18	▲20	Kaya Baysal	357
19	Steady	Caleb Hope	343
20	▼11	Alex Spellman	337
21	▲11	Mursel Yavuz	336
22	▼2	Ross Montgomery	335
23	▲11	Marcus Maier	331
24	▼3	Cliff Prior	327
25	▼11	Alex Williams	327
26	▲69	Mark Cleaver	319
27	▲3	Ethan De Veyra	315
28	▼3	Darren Johnson	303
29	▼3	François Schweyen	292
30	▼6	Thomas Junghans	287
31	▼2	Franko Giuliani	279
32	▼5	Kevin Luke	276

WDF Women's World Rankings as of 17 August 2026.
Rank	Change	Player	Points
1	Steady	Deta Hedman	1384
2	Steady	Lerena Rietbergen	967
3	Steady	Priscilla Steenbergen	856
4	Steady	Rhian O'Sullivan	819
5	Steady	Gemma Hayter	818
6	Steady	Kirsi Viinikainen	795
7	Steady	Nicole Regnaud	776
8	Steady	Irina Armstrong	711
9	Steady	Aileen de Graaf	698
10	Steady	Maria Carli	650
11	Steady	Lorraine Hyde	643
12	Steady	Paula Jacklin	619
13	Steady	Jitka Císařová	600
14	Steady	Paula Murphy	524
15	Steady	Eve Watson	517
16	Steady	Cali West	500
17	Steady	Paige Pauling	496
18	Steady	Mayumi Ouchi	489
19	Steady	Rachna David	487
20	Steady	Anca Zijlstra	465
21	Steady	Tracy Feiertag	448
22	Steady	Emine Dursun	406
23	Steady	Desi Mercer	400
24	Steady	Sophie McKinlay	390
25	Steady	Lovely-Mae Orbeta	386
26	Steady	Aaja Jalbert	385
27	Steady	Aurora Fochesato	357
28	Steady	Miyu Miyawaki	347
29	Steady	Kosuzu Iwao	337
30	Steady	Steph Clarke	320
31	Steady	Christine Richardson-Clark	315
32	Steady	Yukie Sakaguchi	314

== WDF World No1 men's and women's players (1976–current) ==
Year	Men	Women
1976	(Wales) Alan Evans	No rankings
1977	(England) John Lowe	No rankings
1978	(Wales) Leighton Rees	No rankings
1979	(England) John Lowe (2)	No rankings
1980	(England) Eric Bristow	No rankings
1981	(England) Eric Bristow (2)	No rankings
1982	(Scotland) Jocky Wilson	No rankings
1983	(England) Eric Bristow (3)	No rankings
1984	(England) Eric Bristow (4)	(England) Sandy Reitan
1985	(England) Eric Bristow (5)	(New Zealand) Lilian Barnett
1986	(England) John Lowe (3)	(England) Linda Batten
1987	(England) Bob Anderson	(Sweden) Maarit Fagerholm
1988	(England) John Lowe (4)	(England) Jayne Kempster
1989	(England) Bob Anderson (2)	(England) Sharon Colclough
1990	(England) Eric Bristow (6)	(England) Sharon Colclough (2)
1991	(England) Phil Taylor	(England) Sharon Colclough (3)
1992	(England) Rod Harrington	(England) Mandy Solomons
1993	(Belgium) Leo Laurens	(England) Mandy Solomons (2)
1994	(England) Steve Beaton	Deta Hedman
1995	(Wales) Richie Burnett	Deta Hedman (2)
1996	(England) Martin Adams	Deta Hedman (3)
1997	(England) Martin Adams (2)	Deta Hedman (4)
1998	(England) Ronnie Baxter	(Netherlands) Francis Hoenselaar
1999	(Netherlands) Raymond van Barneveld	(England) Trina Gulliver
2000	(Netherlands) Raymond van Barneveld (2)	(England) Trina Gulliver (2)
2001	(England) Mervyn King	(England) Trina Gulliver (3)
2002	(England) John Walton	(England) Trina Gulliver (4)
2003	(England) Martin Adams (3)	(England) Trina Gulliver (5)
2004	(Netherlands) Raymond van Barneveld (3)	(England) Trina Gulliver (6)
2005	(Netherlands) Raymond van Barneveld (4)	(England) Trina Gulliver (7)
2006	(Netherlands) Jelle Klaasen	(England) Trina Gulliver (8)
2007	(Scotland) Gary Anderson	(England) Trina Gulliver (9)
2008	(England) Scott Waites	(Netherlands) Francis Hoenselaar (2)
2009	(England) Tony O'Shea	(England) Trina Gulliver (10)
2010	(England) Martin Adams (4)	Deta Hedman (5)
2011	(England) Scott Waites (2)	Deta Hedman (6)
2012	(England) Stephen Bunting	Deta Hedman (7)
2013	(England) James Wilson	Deta Hedman (8)
2014	(England) Alan Norris	Deta Hedman (9)
2015	Darius Labanauskas	Deta Hedman (10)
2016	Darius Labanauskas (2)	Deta Hedman (11)
2017	Scott Mitchell	Aileen de Graaf
2018	Jim Williams	Deta Hedman (12)
2019	Nick Kenny	(Netherlands) Aileen de Graaf (2)
2020	Wayne Warren	Deta Hedman (13)
2021	Brian Raman	Deta Hedman (14)
2022	Jelle Klaasen (2)	Beau Greaves
2023	Andy Baetens	Beau Greaves (2)
2024	Jimmy van Schie	Beau Greaves (3)
2025	Jimmy van Schie (2)	Deta Hedman (15)

The rankings show Deta Hedman and Trina Gulliver as consistently being the leading women's player's, having been number one on a record ten or more occasions each. No male player has held the number one position as many years Gulliver and Hedman, although Eric Bristow has held the top position for a record six times. The rankings for the men has become even more complex since the inception of the Professional Darts Corporation (PDC) formerly the World Darts Council (WDC). The leading ranked players in 1993/94 split from the BDO and they have their own world ranking system known as the Order of Merit. The players from the PDC are not included in the rankings because the BDO, the former British governing body of amateur darts, was the one recognised by the WDF.

== See also ==
- WDF World Darts Championship
- BDO World Darts Championship
- PDC World Darts Championship
- World Professional Darts Championship

== Sources ==
- Kramer, Anne (2013). The Ultimate Book of Darts A Complete Guide to Games, Gear, Terms, and Rules. New York: Skyhorse Publishing, Inc. ISBN 9781626365261.
- McNeely, Scott (2012). The ultimate book of sports. San Francisco: Chronicle Books. ISBN 9781452121871.
- Nauright, John; Parrish, Charles (2012). Sports around the world : history, culture, and practice. Santa Barbara, Calif.: ABC-CLIO. ISBN 9781598843002.
