= The Price Is Right Live! =

American staged game show

- Original language: English
- Subject: The Price Is Right

Premiere
- Date: September 25, 2003
- Place: Harrah's Reno
- Official website

The Price Is Right LIVE! is a staged production show based on the television game show The Price Is Right.

The live stage shows were originally held at Caesars Entertainment casinos, as well as the Foxwoods Resort & Casino in Connecticut and the Seminole Casino Coconut Creek in Coconut Creek, Florida. Following the expiration of the contract with Caesars, the show now travels to various venues throughout the United States and Canada. The show made its Canadian debut at Great Canadian Casino’s River Rock and Boulevard Casino Resorts in British Columbia in 2010. This tour occurred following Howard Blank visiting the production at Bally’s Las Vegas and meeting with the Fremantle team in Burbank. They are produced in association with Fremantle.

== Game play ==
In some cases, audience members for each show are asked a series of pricing questions; in some venues, this involves the use of audience response keypads; in others, a pricing game is played at registration prior to the show. The top scorers in both accuracy and speed are called as contestants for the One-Bid. In still other cases (such as the former Las Vegas and Atlantic City productions, the Branson show and the current touring production), contestants are chosen through a random drawing. Unlike on the television show, an entirely new set of contestants are chosen to bid on each One-Bid item and participate in the Showcase Showdown and Showcase. "Contestants not appearing on stage" receive a T-shirt.

A contestant who bids exactly correctly on a One-Bid receives $100 in cash.

In addition to the people chosen as contestants, other audience members are randomly chosen to win small prizes in-between each pricing game. When the show ran at Caesars casinos, the prizes were Caesars Total Rewards credits; the current touring production gives away gift cards for Amazon.com.

Typically, the pricing games and Showcases are played for lower stakes and smaller prizes than on the TV version. Like the television series, contestants do not have to pay an admission fee to be eligible to be selected as contestants, although they must purchase a ticket to see the entire show.

=== Pricing games ===
Eleven of the show's pricing games have been featured in the live show:

- Any Number—Played using the original rules, with no repeating digits. The top prize is typically worth around $2,000.
- Check-Out
- Cliff Hangers
- Clock Game—Played using the original rules, with no bonus for winning both prizes.
- Hole in One (or Two)—Played for merchandise instead of a car.
- It's in the Bag—The top prize is $2,400, with the first four bags worth $150, $300, $600, and $1,200.
- One Wrong Price—During some shows, the host will invoke the Monty Hall problem and remove one of the non-selected correctly-priced prizes, then offer the contestant any of the three prizes to keep and end the game. If the contestant turns down this offer, the game's normal all-or-nothing rules apply.
- Plinko—The top prize is currently $2,500, with a value distribution of $100-$150-$250-$0-$500-$0-$250-$150-$100.
- Punch-a-Bunch—The top prize is $5,000, with a valure distribution of 1-$5,000, 1-$1,000, 2-$750, 4-$500, 12-$300, 15-$200, 15-$100.
- Race Game
- Secret 'X'
- Ten Chances—A modified version of the game, dubbed "Ten Chances—Showcase Edition", features four prizes. However, more than one incorrect number can be displayed in the numbers to choose from. The contestant is still told how many numbers make up the price. No more than three chances can be used for any one prize (except the final prize), allowing for at least one chance at the last prize, which is a car normally in the $14,000 range.

=== Showcase Showdown ===
Three contestants are called down to play. Getting $1 in one or two spins awards $100, in the bonus spin, getting a green section awards $500 while the dollar is worth $1,000. The winning contestant (under normal Showcase Showdown rules) receives $250. In the event of a tie, the players get one spin in a spinoff, the higher number won; if the tie involved concurrently with the bonus spin, another spinoff was done but no more money to be won.

=== Showcase ===
Two contestants are called down to play. Both contestants are shown a single showcase and bid on it by writing down their bids. After the bids are checked to ensure neither is duplicated, the contestant closer to the actual retail price of the showcase wins a pre-determined prize from the showcase. The contestant must be within $100 of the actual price of the showcase to win the entire showcase, which typically includes a car, the only time a car is given away on the live show.

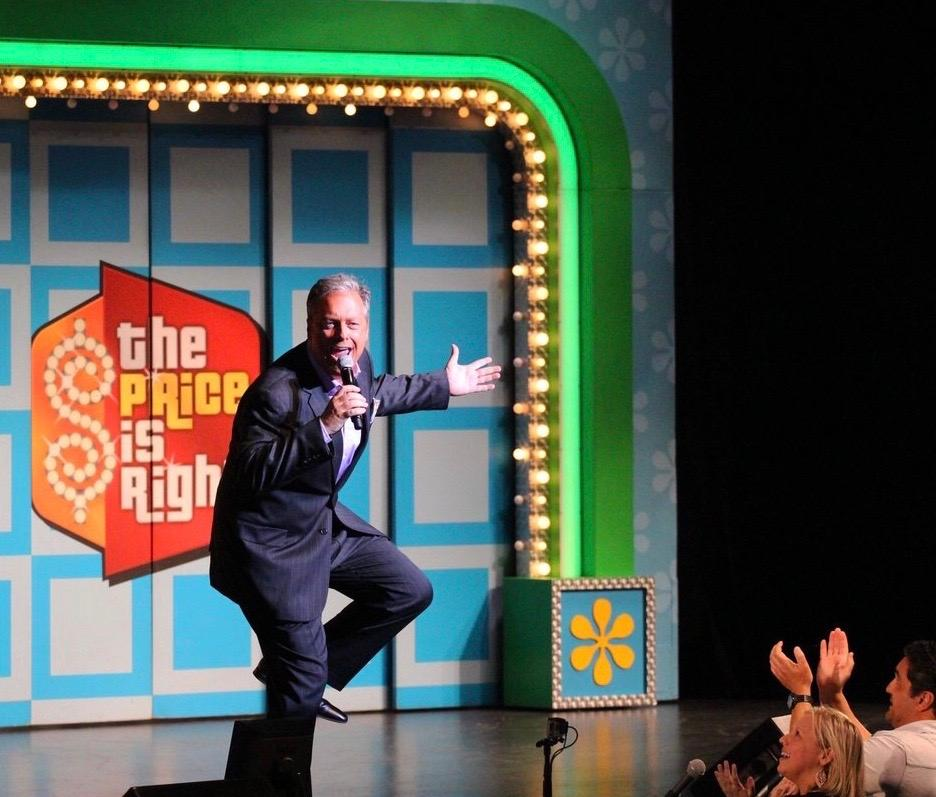
Todd Newton hosts The Price Is Right Live in Miami, FL. 2019

== Hosts ==
The production features a rotating series of hosts. Hosts have included Todd Newton, Marc Summers, David Ruprecht, Pat Finn, Mark L. Walberg, Roger Lodge, Michael Burger, JD Roberto, George Hamilton, Doug Davidson, Bob Goen, Chuck Woolery, Marco Antonio Regil, Alan Thicke, Drew Lachey, Jerry Springer, Joey Fatone, and current television announcer George Gray.

Newton, Summers, Regil, Davidson, and Hamilton were contenders to replace Bob Barker, a job that ultimately went to Drew Carey. Davidson was also the host of a short-lived syndicated spinoff of the show known as The New Price Is Right, which ran for four months in 1994. Regil, who is bilingual, hosted the Mexican version of the show (Atinale al Precio), which has aired at various times since 1997, including the current Warman-style UK Showcase format that debuted in April 2010. Roberto has also been an announcer for the television version in 2010 (episodes taped August 2010 to start season 39). Gray, who became announcer in 2011, began doing occasional shows starting in 2013.

== Announcers ==
Announcers for the show include James "Jim" Gruessing (2018-Present), Randy West (who was the regular Las Vegas announcer for several years), Daniel Rosen, David Ruprecht, JD Roberto, Dave Walls and others. West, Rosen, and Roberto have been substitute announcers for select episodes of the CBS version in both daytime and prime time, with West and Rosen during the 2003 announcer search and Roberto in the 2010 search. Roberto was the announcer who debuted the television high-stakes pricing game "Pay the Rent". Andy Taylor, formerly of radio station KTTS in Springfield, MO is the announcer for the Branson show. Chinese-Canadian television presenter Benny Yau was co-announcer with Howard Blank for the show's Canadian debut at Vancouver, Canada in May 2011, where the show was done in English, Cantonese, and Mandarin. Howard Blank was the announcer for the cross Canada tour presented by Live Nation in March of 2013.
