= Atínale al precio =

Mexican game show

- Created by: Bob Stewart
- Developed by: Grundy (1997-2000); Fremantle (2010)
- Presented by: Marco Antonio Regil
- Announcer: Jaime Kurt; Rubén Aguirre; Héctor Sandarti; Julio César Palomera
- Country of origin: Mexico
- Original language: Spanish
- No. of episodes: c. 900

Production
- Production locations: Televisa Studios; Mexico City, Mexico
- Running time: 60 Minutes

Original release
- Network: Canal de las Estrellas
- Release: 6 October 1997 – December 2000
- Release: October 2010 – January 2011

Related
- The Price Is Right (1972-present)

Atínale al Precio (Get the Price Right) is a Mexican game show based on The Price Is Right that has aired in two separate runs on Televisa, both hosted by Marco Antonio Regil. The format is similar to the American version of the show, featuring many pricing games that have also appeared on that version. The first run was from October 1997 to December 2000 and the second run was from October 2010 to January 2011.

== Format ==
Both versions of the show were very similar, including being hosted by Marco Antonio Regil (who had in 2007 been considered as host for the American version), but the 2010 run had increased price points, new music, and new scenery. The 1997 version borrowed elements from the American show, including the set and game styles, and a logo with a light border in its intro. It also used a salsa arrangement of the U.S. main theme. Elements borrowed from the British version included in-show sponsorship and a car in the Showcase Showdown.

In March 2000, El Universal reported that more than MXN$130 million pesos had been up to that point. It was announced in August that the show would conclude in December after its 785th episode.

The 2010 version incorporated elements from the American, British, French and Italian versions, including using an intro similar to the French show. The show was sponsored by the supermarket chain Chedraui, and cars were supplied by General Motors. Unlike in the previous incarnation, the announcer introduced host Regil before the first four contestants were called on down.

=== One Bid ===
The four players in Contestants' Row compete in a One Bid qualifying game to determine which contestant will play the next pricing game. A prize usually worth MXN$2,500 (1997 version) or MXN$6,000 (2010 version) or less is shown and, beginning with the last player to be called down (or the player farthest-left during the first One Bid), each contestant gives a single bid for the item. The order of bidding moves from left to right. Contestants must bid in whole pesos and may not bid the same amount as any player bid previously for that item. The player whose bid is closest to the actual retail price of the prize without going over wins the prize and plays the next pricing game.

Both versions awarded a bonus of MXN$1,000 for bidding the exact price of the item.

If all four contestants overbid, a buzzer sounds before the price is revealed. The host announces the lowest bid, the bids are erased and the bidding process is repeated in the same manner with the contestants instructed to bid lower than the lowest of the original bids.

=== Pricing games ===
A total of 48 (1997) or 43 (2010) pricing games were played in rotation. Fifteen new games were introduced, replacing several from the 1997 version.

Game	English equivalent	1997 version	2010 version	Notes	Refs
3 Strikes	3 Strikes	Yes	Yes	Rules in effect in 1997 on US version used with three strikes in the bag; the one-strike rule, adopted in 1998, was not used in this version	
4 Rounds	Punch-a-Bunch	Yes	Yes		
A la 1, A las 2, A las 3	Easy as 1 2 3	Yes	Yes		
A lo dado, dado	Dice Game	Yes	No		
Águila o Sol	Flip Flop	No	Yes	First number was given for free	
Al Final del Arcoiris	Golden Road	Yes	No		
Cambalache	Switch?	Yes	Yes		
Cambiadero	Switcheroo	No	Yes	Played for a car, three 3-digit prizes, and one 2-digit prize	
Cero A La Derecha	Grand Game	Yes	No		
Cero de La Fortuna	Grand Game	No	Yes	Seven items, of which five are below the given target price for a top prize of MXN$100,000	
Cinco Precios en Busca de un Premio	Five Price Tags	Yes	Yes	Never played for a car	
Con Melón o con Sandía	Double Prices	Yes	Yes	The top price represents "Melón" [cantaloupe] whereas bottom price represents "Sandía" [watermelon]. The rules are to say "Melón" or "Sandía" by both the contestant and audience to guess which price.	
Contra Reloj	Race Game	Yes	Yes		
Contrapeso	Balance Game	No	Yes		
¿Cuánto Fue?	Check-Out	No	Yes		
Cubreprecios	Cover Up	No	Yes		
Cuestión Centavos	Penny Ante	Yes	No		
Dale Al Centro	Bullseye	Yes	No		
Dame Carta	Card Game	Yes	No		
De Par en Par	Money Game	Yes	Yes		
Dígito Aventura	Any Number	Yes	Yes		
¿Dόnde Quedό La Bolita?	Shell Game	Yes	Yes	Played with groceries instead of small prizes in the 2010 version	
Échatelo A la Bolsa	It's in the Bag	Yes	Yes		
El Apretón	Squeeze Play	Yes	Yes		
El Cofre del Tesoro	Fortune Hunter	Yes	Yes		
El Derroche	Hi Lo	No	Yes		
El Gato Encerrado	Secret "X"	Yes	Yes		
El Misterio de los Números Perdidos	None	No	Yes	Not based in any US game; the contestant is shown a partially filled-in price and two "lost numbers." The contestant must place the "lost numbers" in the correct position to win the prize.	
El Panal	Spelling Bee	Yes	Yes	Played with groceries in earlier episodes of the 2010 version	
El Revoltijo	2 for the Price of 1	Yes	No	Played for a four-digit small prize with the first digit already given; likewise, the contestant still can give a choice of the other three for free as well	
El Tiempo Es Oro	Clock Game	Yes	Yes	45 seconds played	
En la Zona Ganadora	Range Game	Yes	Yes		
Engarroteseme Ahí	Freeze Frame	Yes	No		
Entre Azúl y Buenas Noches	Magic #	Yes	No		
Escoge Un Par	Pick-a-Pair	Yes	No		
¡Está Carísimo!	That's Too Much!	No	Yes		
Hoyo En Uno o Dos	Hole in One or Two	Yes	Yes		
Juego de Poker	Poker Game	Yes	No		
La Caja Fuerte	Safe Crackers	Yes	Yes		
La Ganga	Barker's Bargain Bar/Bargain Game	Yes	Yes		
La Línea de la Fortuna	Line 'em Up	Yes	No		
La Llave Maestra	Master Key	Yes	Yes	Played with grocery items in the 2010 version	
La Montaña Siniestra	Cliff Hangers	Yes	Yes	Played with grocery items instead of small prizes	
La Morralla	Pocket ¢hange	No	Yes		
La Movida	Make Your Move	Yes	No		
Las Marcas de Marco	Barker's Markers	Yes	No		
Límite de Crédito	Credit Card	No	Yes	Game was removed from U.S. rotation at the time	
Los Cazadores del Precio Perdido	Pathfinder	Yes	No		
Número A La Casa	Pick-A-Number	Yes	Yes		
Para Un Lado O Para El Otro	Side by Side	Yes	Yes		
Pasa El Peso	Pass the Buck	No	Yes		
Paso A Pasito	Step Up	No	Yes		
Plinko	Plinko	Yes	Yes	In the 1997 version, it was played with grocery items; in the 2010 version, it was played for a MXN$100,000 cash prize, and played with grocery items	
Rodar y Rodar	Let 'em Roll	Yes	Yes		
Siete de La Suerte	Lucky $even	Yes	Yes	Played with MX$13 in the 2010 version	
Tanque Lleno	Gas Money	No	Yes	2008-09 rules used in that price of car had to be picked first, then the contestant had to discard the four wrong prices	
Te Doy Diez	Ten Chances	Yes	No	Used wipes-off boards like in the UK version	
Tentación	Temptation	Yes	No		
Toma O De	Give or Keep	Yes	No		
Trece de La Suerte	Lucky $even	Yes	No	Siete de La Suerte for cars with 6-digit prices	
Uno Arriba o Uno Abajo	One Away	Yes	Yes		
Vamos a Gastar	Shopping Spree	Yes	No		
Vamos A Mitas	1/2 Off	No	Yes		
Vienes o Te Vas	Coming or Going	No	Yes		

=== La Ruleta (Showcase Showdown) ===
La Ruleta was played the same way as the Showcase Showdown on the American version and had the same wheel patterns (100, 15, 80, 35, 60, 20, 40, 75, 55, 95, 50, 85, 30, 65, 10, 45, 70, 25, 90, 5). The bonus for MXN$1 (one or two spins) was worth MXN$1,000. The highest number won the showdown; in the event of a tie, the contestants got one spin each, with the highest number winning the showdown.

In the bonus spin in both versions, if the wheel stopped on MXN$0.05, the contestant won a bonus prize of MXN$5,000; if it stopped on MXN$0.15, the player won a bonus prize of MXN$15,000; and if it stopped on MXN$1, a new car was won. The higher number without exceeding MXN$1 (if nobody spun the peso) went on to El Gran Paquete (Showcase); in the event of a tie, the tied players advanced to a one-spin spin-off. The highest number won the place in the Showcase. If multiple players spun the peso, the bonus spin simultaneously acted as a spin-off; only the spin-off score counted, not the bonus prizes (i.e., if a player spun 15 and won MXN$15,000, it would not beat the second player if their spin was anywhere from 20 to the peso, or 1.00). The highest number again won the place in El Gran Paquete. However, if the bonus spin also ended in a tie, there was another spin-off, but no more money could be won.

Regardless of whether the player was over or under MXN$1, a two-note buzzer sounded if they lost the showdown.

=== El Gran Paquette (The Showcase) ===
In the 1997 version, El Gran Paquette followed the same rules as the Showcase when the show aired in 1997, with a 100 peso rule for both showcases. The US version's rule changed in 1998 to US$250, but the rule stayed at MXN$100. The closest bid without going over won the showcase, and won both if their bid came within 100 pesos of the actual price of the Showcase. If there was a double overbid, neither won their showcase. The show had only two double showcase winners in its original run; the first winner came within MXN$83 of the actual retail price, while the second came within MNX$36.

El Gran Paquete in the 2010 version was played in a one-player format similar to European versions and the 1994 syndicated version of the show, with the price ranges between MXN$5,000 and MXN$30,000, and whatever the contestant stopped was the range the contestant had to come from the actual retail price of the Showcase without going over to win it. The closest win was MXN$16 from the actual retail price.

== Merchandise ==
A board game based on the 2010 version with Marco Antonio Regil along with La Ruleta (Showcase wheel) on the cover of the box has been released by Fotorama in 2010.
