= The New Price Is Right =

The New Price is Right can refer to the following incarnations of the television game show The Price Is Right:

- The Price Is Right (American game show), which used the title from 1972–1973 on the daytime show and in print ads for the nighttime show until at least 1974
- The New Price Is Right (1994 game show), a short-lived syndicated version hosted by Doug Davidson
- The Price Is Right (Australian game show), which used the title during Ian Turpie's hosting run from 1981–1986
- The Price Is Right (British game show), which used the title during Bob Warman's hosting run in 1989
