= Cindy Fisher =

Cindy Fisher may refer to:

- Cindy Fisher (basketball)
- Cindy Fisher (actress)
