= British Polio Fellowship =

British charitable organisation

The British Polio Fellowship
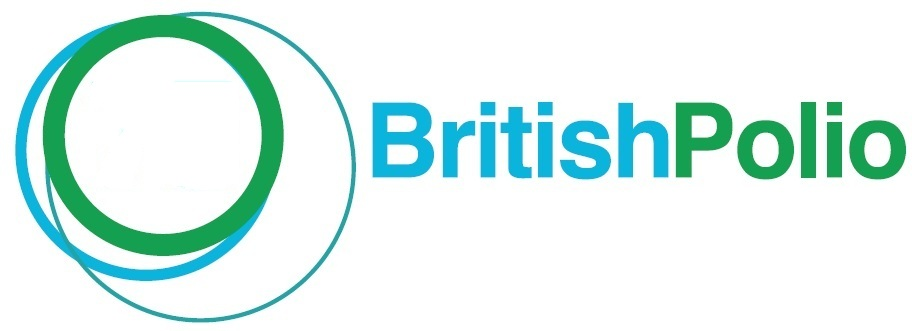
- Founded: 1939
- Founder: Patricia Carey & Frederic Morena
- Type: Charitable organisation
- Registration no.: England & Wales (1108335); Scotland (SC038863)
- Location: CP House, Otterspool Way, Watford, WD25 8HR
- Origins: London, England (UK)
- Region served: UK
- CEO: Ted Hill
- Website: www.britishpolio.org.uk
- Formerly called: The Infantile Paralysis Fellowship

The British Polio Fellowship is a charitable organisation supporting and empowering people in the UK living with the late effects of polio and post-polio syndrome (PPS). It provides information, welfare and support to those affected, to enable them to live full, independent and integrated lives and campaigns to raise awareness of PPS.

== Purpose ==
The charity's purpose is to empower and support all people in the UK living with the effects of polio and PPS by providing information, welfare and support to enable them to live full independent and integrated lives; by supporting a regional/branch/group structure that enables mutual support amongst members to be carried out in a caring and inclusive environment; and by developing worldwide alliances with other polio and post-polio groups. It aims to be the first resource on polio and post polio syndrome.

== Activities ==
It is a membership organisation with branches and groups across the UK. It publishes a quarterly magazine, the bulletin; and campaigns to raise awareness of PPS among healthcare professionals, members of parliament and the general public and supports the efforts of fellow polio organisations in their attempts to eradicate the disease worldwide.

== History ==
The British Polio Fellowship, then called The Infantile Paralysis Fellowship, was founded on 29 January 1939 by Patricia Carey, who had contracted polio aged eight, and Frederic Morena, who had contracted the disease at the age of 42, as a self-help and mutual aid society for those affected by polio. They called a meeting in January 1938 at Bloomsbury, London which was attended by 30 people and which acted as the foundation of the organisation being formed the following year. The first issue of the charity's newsletter was published in April 1939. On 18 May 1939 a letter from Hugh Moulton, Liberal politician, was published informing the public of the formation of the Infantile Paralysis Fellowship which "seeks to help the sufferers help themselves and to afford each other mutual aid and sympathy". The letter went on to say the principal objective of the Fellowship was to help members find work and suggested that there were (at that time) somewhere between 5,000 and 7,000 people with the after-effects of infantile paralysis in Britain.

Over time the focus of the charity's work has shifted due to the eradication of polio in the UK during the 1980s and the discovery of post-polio syndrome, and the fellowship's work has become more about supporting those with PPS.

== Patrons ==
- Michael Cassidy CBE
- Baroness Fookes of Plymouth, DBE, DL
- Julian P Harriss, BSc, MSc, MD, FRCP (Can)
- Dr Robin Luff, MBBS, FRCP, FRCS, BSc
- Professor Steve Sturman, Mbch, FRCP, UBH
- Jonathan Cavendish
- Richard Scudamore CBE
- Mark Isherwood AM
- Dr Rosalind Miles
- Robin Askwith

== Ambassadors ==
- Julia Roberts (QVC presenter)
- Anne Wafula Strike MBE
- Professor Gareth Williams
- Hamish Thompson
- Julia Roberts
