= Julia Roberts (television presenter) =

British television host

Julia Roberts (born 10 June 1956) is a British television home shopping host on the shopping channel QVC.

== Dancer ==
Roberts started her career as a cabaret dancer, supporting Cannon and Ball in a summer season in Guernsey, and then followed their act on to television. She supplemented this work with various supporting cast roles on TV including Citizen Smith and Doctor Who in 1979, Christmas pantomimes and dancing on cruise liners. She then took a job in a cabaret show in Hong Kong, dancing and singing.

Roberts returned to the UK, and appeared in various commercials, including the Woolwich Building Society and Head & Shoulders shampoo. In 1980, she was approached by a group called The Main Event to sing on their Eurovision Song contest entry, "I'm Gonna Do My Best To Please You" – which came last. The ensemble included Cheryl Baker, who won the following year as part of Bucks Fizz.

== Television ==
Wishing to undertake more television, she appeared as a hostess on The Price is Right with Leslie Crowther. After two series she had her first child, Daniel, and then worked on the 'Hit Squad' on Beadle's About, before having her second child, Sophie.

After the birth of her first child, Roberts and her husband Chris were living in South London, when Croydon Cable started cabling the local streets. Looking to get into television presentation, she sent in an audition tape based on her time at the 1989 Motorshow at Olympia for Vauxhall Motors. Roberts got the job undertaking general reporting duties, developing her role by presenting on her own 'magazine-style' program on the station. It was during this period that she began presenting the channel's shows on Crystal Palace F.C., which resulted in her great enthusiasm for the football club. Roberts is a season ticket holder, has in the past written a column in Palace News and been interviewed for Sky TV, and has presented half-time slots on the giant screen in the stadium, promoting club merchandise.

Asked by her agent to apply for a new shopping channel in 1993, she presented a pilot slot on presenting her own mobile phone for 15 minutes, and a pencil for 5 minutes. Appearing on the channel's opening sequences with co-presenter Jon Briggs, Roberts is one of two original cast members who have been with QVC since its launch in the UK in October 1993. Roberts was one of two judges, the other being Head of Presenters Mark West, who selected Craig Rowe as winner of QVC's 'Search for a Presenter'.
