= Natalie Pike =

British model and presenter (born 1983)

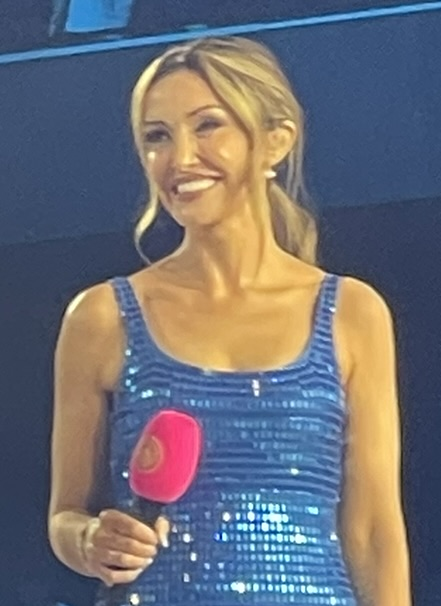
- Pike in 2026
- Born: Natalie Sheila Hannah Pike; 4 April 1983 (age 43); Edinburgh, Scotland
- Occupations: Sports broadcaster; model
- Modelling information
- Height: 5 ft 7 in (170 cm)
- Hair colour: Brown
- Eye colour: Brown

Natalie Sheila Hannah Pike (born 4 April 1983) is a British sports broadcaster, currently working as a presenter for Manchester City FC, BBC Radio 5 Live, TalkSport, DAZN and TNT.

== Early life ==
Pike was born in Edinburgh, Scotland, and raised in Berwick-on-Tweed and Stockport in England. She attended Ladybrook Primary School until the age of 11, then went to Bramhall High School until the age of 16, and sat her A-levels at Aquinas Sixth Form College, in maths, communication studies and performing arts. Pike completed a degree in film and media studies at Manchester Met University in 2004.

== Career ==
=== Modelling ===
Pike won the FHM magazine High Street Honeys modelling competition in 2004. She appeared on the front cover of FHM again in 2005 and 2007.

She was a hostess on the ITV1 game show The Price Is Right, presented by Joe Pasquale.

Pike appeared on the first season of the UK version of Beauty and the Geek, which aired on Channel 4 and E4. She was partnered with Mathematics student Jamie Sawyer, and they were eliminated after three episodes.

=== Broadcasting ===
Pike is an avid Manchester City supporter, and modelled the new kit in 2006. Since 2011, she has worked as a presenter for the club's in-house media team, including City Square Live, the Manchester City match day programme, interviewing players and celebrities, as well as providing analysis on games. She presents Match Day Live at Manchester City with guests including former players, pundits and fans.

Pike began her radio career at local radio station XS Manchester, presenting a weekly football talk show on Friday nights, and later, providing maternity cover for the station's breakfast show.

On 29 May 2021, Pike became the first female winner of the 'Champion of Champions' edition of BBC Radio 5 Live's sports show Fighting Talk.

In August 2021, Pike became the new co-presenter of Talking Balls, which she presents with Gaz Drinkwater on BBC Radio Manchester three nights a week. She is also a relief presenter for BBC Radio 5 Live's football phone-in show, 606.

Pike was a director of the Stockport-based homeless charity, The Wellspring, from 1 March 2018 to 7 February 2019.

Pike and Sam Allardyce began hosting a podcast called No Tippy Tappy Football in October 2022.

== Personal life ==
On 26 December 2013, Pike escaped serious injury as her car spun off the A1 on black ice as she was driving from Scotland to Manchester, and was taken to hospital in Newcastle-upon-Tyne. She has a son born on 1 October 2017.
