= Calyssa Davidson =

American violinist

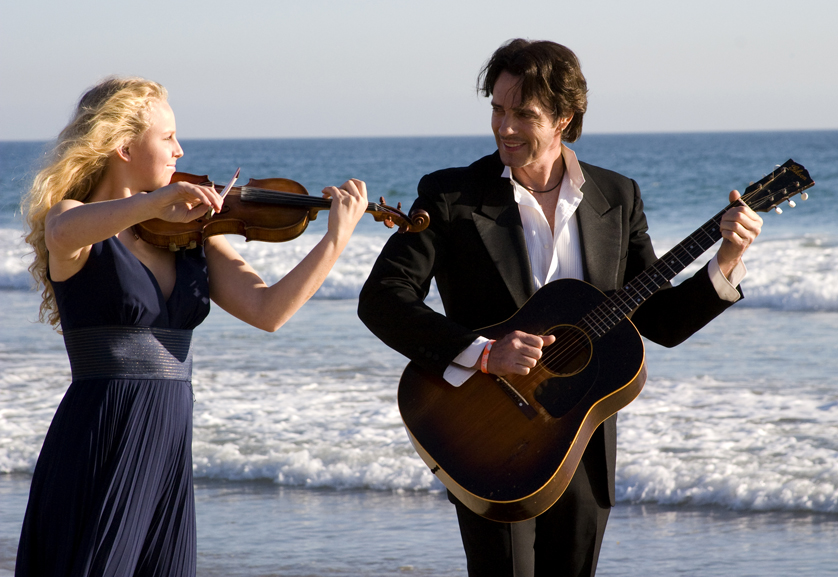
- Calyssa Davidson with Rick Springfield from music video, "Christmas With You".

Background information
- Born: Calyssa Rae Davidson; December 27, 1989 (age 36)
- Origin: Los Angeles, California, United States
- Genres: Classical, rock
- Occupation: Violinist
- Instrument: Violin
- Years active: 2007– Present

Calyssa Rae Davidson (born December 27, 1989) is an American violinist. She is the daughter of Emmy Award winning actor Doug Davidson and actress Cindy Fisher.

== Education ==
Davidson was born in Beverly Hills, California. In 2006, she dropped out of Dos Pueblos High School to pursue a music career, completing her General Educational Development (GED) requirements at Santa Barbara City College graduating ahead of her class. While at Santa Barbara City College, she studied the violin at the Colburn School in Los Angeles, California. She went on to earn her Bachelor of Music Degree in Violin Performance and her Master's Degree in both Violin Performance and Composition for Screen from the Royal College of Music in London, England.

== Career ==
Davidson worked and appeared in Zac Efron's film, 17 Again. She can also be seen in rock and roll legend Rick Springfield's music video, "Christmas With You".

At the age of 16, she began recording solo violin for numerous bands, groups and commercials in her hometown of Santa Barbara, California, including the theme for the Santa Barbara International Film Festival.

Davidson played alongside Rick Springfield once again for the Holiday Celebration on Ice in Little Rock, Arkansas before a sold-out Verizon Arena. Also featured was classic rock band REO Speedwagon. The concert was filmed and then aired later on NBC nationwide and was rebroadcast on five other networks.

In late 2008, Davidson was offered a role on the Disney Channel series JONAS, but turned it down when producers insisted on the character playing the cello instead of the violin. Despite declining the job, Davidson was asked to perform for the cast and crew on the set of JONAS.

== Music videos ==
- "Christmas with You" – Rick Springfield

== Discography ==
- 2007: "Eye and Brain" – CD Recording Solo Violin
- 2008: "SPARO" – CD Recording Solo Violin
- 2009: "Carmelo" – CD Recording Solo Violin
- 2010: Goodbye Elliott – CD Recording Lead Violin
- 2011: Grover Anderson – CD Recording Lead Violin
- 2013: Roo Panes – CD Recording Solo Violin
- 2016: NORD by Ezra Axelrod – EP Recording Lead Violin
- 2020: After Midnight by Gareth Murphy – Single Release Solo Violin
- 2021: Paradise with Julia Thomsen – CD Recording Solo Violin

== Filmography ==
Year	Title	Role	Notes
2006	Santa Barbara International Film Festival	Lead Violin	Theme Tune
2009	Holiday Celebration on Ice	Solo Violin	NBC's Televised Live Concert
2011	PlayStation 3: Medieval Moves	Lead Violin	Video Game Advert
2011	Monsieur Noir	Solo Violin	Short Film – nominated for best film score at the SoundTrack Cologne 8.0 European Talent Awards
2014	Normandy '44: The Battle Beyond D-Day	Solo Violin	BBC TV Movie Documentary
2014	"Albert Bachtold's Phantastische Reise" (The Fantastic Journey of Albert Bachtold)	Lead Violin	Swiss Film – dir. C. Ruloff
2015	Shakespeare's Mother: The Secret Life of a Tudor Woman	Solo Violin	BBC TV Movie Documentary
2015	The Cutting Room	Solo Violin	Documentary
2015	A Date with Miss Fortune	Solo Violin	Film
2016	The Story of China	Solo Violin	BBC TV Mini-Series
2016	Michael	Solo Violin	Short Film
2017	Across Frontiers	Solo Violin	Short Film
2017	SPIT: The Story of a Caveman and a Chicken	Solo Violin	Film
2018	Coming Home	Lead Violin	Documentary
2018	Harry & Meghan: A Royal Romance	Solo Violin	Lifetime TV Movie

== Acting ==
Year	Title	Role	Notes
2001	Drug Free America	Lead	Public Service Announcement
2009	17 Again	Suzanne	Feature Film

== Appearances ==
Year	Title	Role	Notes
Holiday Celebration on Ice	Herself	NBC	N/A
Good Morning America	Herself	ABC	N/A
The Early Show	Herself	CBS	N/A
The Rose Parade	Herself	ABC	N/A
"Soap Talk"	Herself	SoapNet	N/A
The Phil Donahue Show	Herself	NBC	N/A
Doug and Lauralee	Herself	Family Channel	N/A

== Theatre ==
Year	Title	Role	Notes
2002	Hansel and Gretel	Gretel	Directed by Bodo Igesa (NY MET)
2018	Pippin (musical)	Violinist	Directed by Jonathan O’Boyle (Southwark Playhouse, London)

== Her instruments ==
Her instruments include a 19th-century, Italian violin made by Francesco Covi, and an electric violin, handcrafted and custom made for Davidson by T.B. of the UK.
