= Liar's Moon =

- Theatrical release poster
- Directed by: David Fisher
- Screenplay by: David Fisher
- Story by: Billy Hanna; Janice Hanna
- Produced by: Don P. Behrns
- Starring: Matt Dillon; Cindy Fisher; Christopher Connelly
- Cinematography: John Hora
- Edited by: Christopher Greenbury
- Music by: Ray Benson
- Production company: Hanna Productions
- Distributed by: Crown International Pictures
- Release dates: April 1981 (WorldFest-Houston); September 10, 1982 (United States)
- Running time: 106 min
- Country: United States
- Language: English
- Budget: $3.2 million

Liar's Moon is a 1981 film directed by David Fisher and starring Matt Dillon, Cindy Fisher, Yvonne De Carlo, and Hoyt Axton. It tells the story of two star-crossed lovers in 1940s Texas—a working-class teen and the banker's daughter who elope to much strife. Texas band Asleep At The Wheel provided multiple songs for the film.

== Synopsis ==
In 1940s east Texas, Jack Duncan, a high school graduate from a blue-collar family, falls in love with Ginny Peterson, who has just returned to town from four years of boarding school. Ginny's father Alex is the town's wealthy banker and was formerly high school sweethearts with Jack's mother, Babs. However, Alex strenuously objects to Ginny's relationship with Jack. At the end of the summer, Jack and Ginny elope in Louisiana—where 17-year-olds can marry without their parents' permission. Jack gets a job in the oil fields while Ginny earns money for household work in the boarding house they now live in.

Alex hires private eye Ray Logan to find the couple. Meanwhile, Ginny learns she is pregnant. Before she can tell Jack, her doctor contacts her previous physician in Texas and reveals that she and Jack share the same father. Upon hearing this upsetting news, Ginny asks Lora Mae Bouvier, a resident in the boarding house who works as a prostitute, to direct her to a midwife who provides illegal abortions.

While Ginny goes to find the provider, the doctor gets an update from Texas that the couple aren’t actually related as Jack’s mother had his birth records changed out of spite when Ginny’s dad dumped her. Ginny goes ahead with the back-alley procedure, which goes badly and results in complications. Jack manages to find Ginny, who has been kidnapped by Logan who intends to finish his job and get his payment despite Ginny's condition. Jack ends up beating up Logan and takes Ginny to a hospital. At the hospital, Jack confronts Alex and Babs and despite the latter expressing their love for both of them, insists that unlike Ginny's teaching him about love, Alex and Babs both ended up only teaching him about lying, based on their years of lies about their history as well as Alex and Ginny's connection. Jack enters Ginny's hospital room, where Ginny tells him, "I bet there's a lover's moon out tonight", and the film ends with her survival implied.

=== Alternate ending ===
Two different endings were filmed and distributed. In the original ending, Ginny dies from complications after the unsafe abortion. This ending was deemed too dark for test audiences, and the happier ending where Ginny lives was screened in some theaters. Cable TV airings have shown both the more positive ending or the original ending, depending on the television channel. VHS copies of the film also included both endings.

== Cast ==
- Matt Dillon as Jack Duncan
- Cindy Fisher as Ginny Peterson
- Hoyt Axton as Cecil Duncan
- Margaret Blye as Ellen 'Babs' Duncan (as Maggie Blye)
- Broderick Crawford as Colonel Tubman
- Christopher Connelly as Alex Peterson
- Molly McCarthy as Connie Peterson
- Tiffany Stettner as Lisa Peterson
- Yvonne De Carlo as Jeanene Dubois
- Susan Tyrrell as Lora Mae Bouvier
- Jim Greenleaf as Mike Miller
- Mark Atkins as Bobby Adams
- Tonja Walker as Karen Covucci
- Richard Moll as Det. Roy Logan
- David Underwood as Richard Thompson
- Clint Hughes as Clifford DeHaven
- Pat Perkins as Pearl
- Dawn Dunlap as Teaser

== Production ==
According to the making-of featurette on the film's Blu-ray release, Billy Hanna wrote the screenplay with his daughter Janice, "drawing on his own experiences growing up on the wrong side of the tracks in Illinois."

The film was shot in and around Houston, Texas. It was Broderick Crawford's last film after 45 years and one of Matt Dillon's earliest films. Liar's Moon was choreographed by Patsy Swayze.

== Critical response ==
In retrospective reviews, critics said Liar's Moon is "highlighted by some fresh young performances", but "veers into an abyss of melodrama in the final reel."

== Home media ==
On February 8, 2022, the MVD Rewind Collection released the film in a high definition Blu-ray edition, which includes making-of featurettes and the alternate ending.
