= Bramhall High School =

Comprehensive school in Greater Manchester, England

Location
- Seal Road; Stockport, Greater Manchester, SK7 2JT; England; 53.36701°N 2.15338°W

Information
- Type: Community school
- Motto: Respect, Resilience, Excellence
- Established: 1967
- Local authority: Stockport
- Department for Education URN: 106139 Tables
- Ofsted: Reports
- Chair of Governors: Sarah Brown
- Headteacher: Paul Williams
- Staff: 134
- Gender: Co-educational
- Age: 11 to 16
- Enrolment: 1317
- Houses: Oliver, Conway, Wharton and Winbolt
- Website: http://bhsweb.co.uk

Bramhall High School is a nine form entry, comprehensive high school for 11 to 16-year-olds in Bramhall, Stockport, Greater Manchester, England. It is a teacher training school in connection with Manchester Metropolitan University.

== History ==
The school opened as Bramhall County Grammar School on Seal Road in 1967, as a co-educational three-form entry grammar school.

It became Bramhall County High School in 1971, with a ten-form entry and a sixth form. New buildings were added to prepare for the comprehensive intake. Until April 1974, it was administered by Cheshire Education Committee. By 1973, it had a twelve-form entry, with around 1,400 pupils.

With the new LEA of Stockport, it became known as Bramhall High School in 1974. In 1975, it was a nine-form entry school, with around 300 in the sixth form; it returned to a twelve-form entry in 1980. Similar to Marple Hall School in Marple, the sixth form was closed in the early 1990s.

Since the introduction of academies under the educational reforms of Michael Gove, several secondary schools in Stockport have opened sixth form centres. Bramhall High School started the consultation process into opening a sixth form at the school, with the view of opening in September 2015.

== Historic press coverage ==
The school came under the spotlight in 2002, when they asked parents of pupils to pay £10 per month to help following cuts in funding from Stockport Education Authority, under the Labour government.

The school was initially criticised after the installation of unisex toilets in 2000, as a move to tackle bullying and smoking. Subsequently, this development has become accepted Government policy and the school features on the 'Bog Standard' website, was selected as a case study in good design by the Design Council and was the subject of a follow-up documentary for the BBC Breakfast programme in 2007 The unisex toilets were segregated again in August 2013.

The school also was the focus of critical news headlines, after it introduced sniffer dogs to search the school premises for traces of illegal drugs.

In March 2007, the school was in the news after banning traditional knotted ties from the school uniform and replacing them with clip-on ties.

== Ofsted report ==
An Ofsted inspection in 2014 rated the school as "Requires improvement" in all categories. Following the previous inspection in 2010, the school had been described as "a good and improving school, with some outstanding features."

In September 2019, the school was inspected again. The inspectors found all aspects to be "Good" or "Outstanding" but, before the inspection, referred to the school's two year Key Stage 3 curriculum model as "the elephant in the room." Ofsted claimed that the requirements of the National Curriculum for a broad and balanced Key Stage 3 syllabus had not been met and repeated the "Requires improvement" judgement. Two months later a similar judgement depressed the judgement at Impington Village College and has caused other schools and academies to make adjustments to their curriculum model, and rewrite their curriculum intent.

== Notable former pupils and staff ==
- Christine Bottomley, actress
- Richard Burden, former Labour MP for Birmingham Northfield
- Tina Cullen, hockey player
- Sacha Dhawan, actor
- Lauren Drummond, actress
- Daniel Ellis, professional footballer
- Keith Fielding, rugby league footballer (former teacher and deputy headteacher)
- Yvette Fielding, television presenter
- Martin Fry, lead singer with 1980s new romantic band ABC
- Aaron Geramipoor, basketball player
- Esther Hall, television actor
- Owen Jones, journalist and writer
- Harriet Millar-Mills, England rugby union International
- Natalie Pike, model and broadcaster
- Graeme Smith, swimmer
- Ben Spencer, rugby union player
- Kelly Wenham, actress
- Hannah Whelan, Olympic gymnast.
