= Leslie Crowther =

English comedian (1933–1996)

Leslie Crowther CBE
- Crowther in The Price Is Right circa.1986
- Born: Leslie Douglas Sargent Crowther; 6 February 1933; West Bridgford, Nottinghamshire, England
- Died: 28 September 1996 (aged 63); Bath, Somerset, England
- Occupations: Comedian; actor; television presenter; game show host
- Years active: Mid-1940s–1992; 1993–94
- Spouse: Jean Stone (m. 1954)
- Children: 5, including Liz

Leslie Douglas Sargent Crowther (6 February 1933 – 28 September 1996) was an English comedian, actor, TV presenter, and game-show host.

== Early life and career ==
Leslie Crowther was born on 6 February 1933 in West Bridgford, Nottinghamshire, son of Leslie Frederick Crowther (1887–1955), of Twickenham, Middlesex and Ethel Maraquita née Goulder (1894–1951).

At the end of 1944, he moved to London with his parents, but was evacuated for a few months to the Isle of Bute until just after the Second World War ended.

Crowther's stage experience began in the mid-1940s. As a youngster he showed promise as a pianist, and in 1944 won a junior scholarship to the Royal Academy of Music. He attended the respected Cone-Ripman Drama School in London, where he met his future wife, and whilst there competed (in 1947) at the Star Junior Ballroom Championships partnering Pamela Cochran, and then at 16, he appeared as a member of the Ovaltineys Concert Party of the Air on Radio Luxembourg. He also attended Nottingham High School and then Thames Valley Grammar School.

On 14 November 1951, Crowther's 56-year-old mother died of a stroke. His father was also an actor. Leslie senior died in January 1955, aged 67, ten days after being hit by a car. Leslie junior had a half-brother, Frank Ronald, from his father's first marriage.

During the late 1950s and early 1960s, Crowther worked on the stage and on radio. His radio work included Ovaltine programmes, Variety Playhouse and Crowther's Crowd.

== Television career ==
Crowther made a name for himself in television in the 1950s, with appearances as presenter of such programmes as the Billy Cotton Band Show and The Black and White Minstrel Show, and later the long-running children's television show Crackerjack for the BBC, from 1960 to 1968. In September 1967, Crowther was the presenter chosen to host the first series of the revamped children's favourites show, Junior Choice, on the newly opened Radio One station. The next year, 1968, he recorded the LP Songs for Swinging Children, released on Pye Records's blue Label.

From 1964 to 1967, Crowther presented Meet the Kids, an annual trip to a children's hospital ward that was screened by the BBC on Christmas Morning. He would walk around the ward meeting the patients, and the show would feature a surprise celebrity, and a present hidden under each bed. Typical locations were Great Ormond Street and Hackney Hospitals. In 1969, Crowther switched to ITV, and A Merry Morning was screened annually, following the same format, usually from the Seacroft Hospital in Leeds.

From the 1970s, Crowther appeared in a number of television commercials for Stork SB Margarine. In 1971, he made The Leslie Crowther Show, a comedy sketch show, with three older comics, Arthur English, Chic Murray and Albert Modley ("Eee it's grand to be daft!") as the internal "rep" company. In 1972 and 1973, he appeared in a television sitcom called My Good Woman, alongside Richard Wilson, Sylvia Syms and Keith Barron. He also narrated two storytelling LPs for children, Tallulah Supercat and Tallulah and the Cat-Burglars. Crowther also appeared as Chesney Allen with Bernie Winters as Allen's partner Bud Flanagan in performances on television and on stage.

In mid-1977, Crowther made an effort to break into radio with the pilot of a comedy show, It's Leslie, by Crowther, recorded in the Regent Sound Stage (now the Vue Cinema in Lower Regent Street) and produced by John Browell. This however did not come to anything and he returned to television.

=== Game shows ===
Crowther was one of the many hosts of the ITV panel/game show Whose Baby? which he presented in the mid-1980s. He also presented the fifth series of Southern Television's children's game show Runaround in 1977, standing in for Mike Reid. He was also host of the first British version of the game show The Price Is Right, from 1984 to 1988, during which time his "Come on down!" catchphrase became familiar. In 1994, Crowther said that when The Price Is Right was cancelled in May 1988, the producers never bothered to contact him directly. Instead, he learned the news from the press who called at his house and asked him how he felt.

In February 1990, he was chosen to be host of the TV show Stars in Their Eyes by Granada TV. The first episode was transmitted on 21 July 1990. Crowther hosted the first three series, and a Christmas special in 1991. At the time of his car crash in October 1992 he was booked to record an Elvis Presley special, which was then hosted by Russ Abbot, and a fourth series, eventually hosted by Matthew Kelly (who would later host the show for 11 years).

== 1992 car crash ==
Crowther's show business career came to a sudden end on 3 October 1992, on the M5 near Cheltenham, when he sustained serious head injuries in a car crash. His Rolls-Royce skidded into the embankment, overturned and ended up on its roof on the hard shoulder of the motorway. It was a complete write-off.

In the months before the crash, Crowther was busy with Lord's Taverners events and functions as well as charity work and public appearances and on the previous evening, 2 October, he had been to a dinner in Swansea where he was guest speaker. He then opened Allied Carpets stores in West Bromwich and Brierley Hill on the morning and early afternoon of 3 October. Crowther was returning home when the crash occurred.

At first, Crowther did not appear to be seriously injured. He could not remember what had happened when he crashed but he was able to tell the traffic police his personal details, including his address, his home telephone number and what tablets he was taking for a heart condition and a faulty heart valve after telling them to contact his family to inform them of the accident. He was taking anti-coagulants and had been diagnosed with heart trouble three years earlier when he complained of feeling breathless. However, after being taken to Cheltenham General Hospital, his condition rapidly deteriorated and he lapsed into unconsciousness. A brain scan revealed a blood clot had formed on the surface of the left-hand side of his brain. It is possible the medication Crowther was taking either triggered the bleeding in his brain after the crash or made it worse. Crowther was taken to Bristol's Frenchay Hospital for brain surgery to remove the blood clot that evening. The operation took four hours.

On the morning of 5 October, a further brain scan revealed that another blood clot, the size of a small apple, had formed on the left frontal lobe of the brain. Crowther then underwent a second brain operation lasting two hours and a tracheotomy was needed to help him breathe. He remained in a coma for 17 days. He was allowed to spend Christmas Day 1992 at home but was a patient in Frenchay Hospital until 12 February 1993. After his discharge, he underwent months of occupational therapy and physiotherapy.

== After the crash and retirement ==
Crowther was appointed a CBE in the 1993 New Year Honours list in recognition of his years of charity work and on 21 July 1993 he went to Buckingham Palace to receive his appointment. On 15 November 1993, he made his first TV appearance since his crash in the Royal Variety Performance, appearing alongside Cilla Black. On stage, he announced that he had just started to write an autobiography. Entitled The Bonus of Laughter, it was published in the autumn of 1994.

Crowther retired from showbusiness on 4 November 1994, accepting that "I wouldn't be able to do things I've done in the past the way I would want to and the way my fans would expect". He also said that he was considering starting a new career as a writer. As he later acknowledged, his mind was still sharp but his body had slowed down. Five days after retiring, he appeared as the subject on This Is Your Life for the second time when he was surprised by Michael Aspel during a book-signing session in Selfridges on London's Oxford Street. He had previously been honoured by This Is Your Life in March 1973 when Eamonn Andrews surprised him at an antiques fair at Earls Court in London. Crowther's final television appearance was in March 1995, as a guest on June Whitfield's This Is Your Life episode.

== Personal life ==
Crowther was an alcoholic and this problem continued throughout the 1960s, 1970s and 1980s. On 14 November 1983, Crowther was arrested for drink-driving. A fortnight later, he was fined £350, and banned from driving for nine months. In October 1988, Crowther arrived drunk at a gala in Glastonbury. This made him realise that he had a serious problem and needed help. Revelation of his alcohol addiction received much publicity. From 5 February to 17 March 1989, Crowther was a resident in Clouds House, a drug and alcohol treatment centre near Shaftesbury. He never drank alcohol again.

On 27 March 1954, Crowther married Jean Elizabeth Stone (12 May 1931 – 10 December 2017). They had five children. Their daughters included Caroline (born 9 December 1954), who married Phil Lynott, and her twin sister Liz.

== Death ==
Crowther died suddenly from heart failure on 28 September 1996 in the Royal United Hospital in Bath, aged 63, with his wife Jean and family at his side. He had been admitted two days earlier for suspected renal failure. He had lived near Bath since 1978 and had a flat in London overlooking Lord's Cricket Ground.

The 30 September 1996 episode of Bruce's Price Is Right, the Bruce Forsyth version of The Price Is Right, was dedicated to the memory of Crowther at the request of Forsyth himself, according to the ITV continuity announcement.

Crowther's remains were cremated a week later, on 7 October. His ashes were later scattered at Lord's and a memorial service was held for him in London on 27 November. Also, at that year's National Television Awards, Matthew Kelly dedicated an award he won for Stars In Their Eyes to Crowther.

Preceded by Eamonn Andrews	Host of Crackerjack; 1960 – 1968	Succeeded by Michael Aspel
Preceded by First host	Host of The Price Is Right; 1984 – 1988	Succeeded by Bob Warman
Preceded by First host	Host of Stars in Their Eyes; 1990 – 1992	Succeeded by Matthew Kelly
Preceded by Tim Rice	President of Lord's Taverners; 1991 – 1992	Succeeded by Prince Edward
