= Bob Warman =

English television presenter

Bob Warman MBE
- Born: Robert Paul Warman; 11 October 1946 (age 79); Walsall, Staffordshire, England
- Education: Wrekin College
- Occupation: Broadcaster
- Years active: 1973–2022
- Employer: ITV

Robert Paul Warman MBE (born 11 October 1946) is an English retired television presenter.

== Early life ==
Warman was born on 11 October 1946 in the Chuckery district of Walsall, Staffordshire. He attended a prep school in Shrewsbury called Kingsland Grange (since renamed Shrewsbury High Prep School) from 1955 to 1959, then from ages of 13 to 18 Wrekin College in Wellington, Shropshire.

== Career ==
Warman originally trained as a civil engineer for two years but took up journalism after being inspired by an older brother who worked on a newspaper. Warman trained in print journalism at the Birmingham Post and Mail. Warman has also owned a series of businesses outside his television work, including a second-hand china dealer shop, video production company, tea/coffee bar in Walsall, and public relations group called Warman PR.

Warman spent most of his television career at ATV and Central, presenting regional news programmes. He was also a regional presenter on Yorkshire Television from 1976 to 1979. During this time he presented Britain's first breakfast programme Good Morning Calendar in 1977. In 1979, he returned to Associated Television, whom he had originally joined in 1973 following a previous position at BBC Radio Birmingham, to work on ATV News. When ATV became Central in 1982, Warman presented the West edition of Central News.

In 1989, Warman hosted the Sky Television version of The Price Is Right based on the American show of the same name as The New Price is Right until 1990.

On 12 April 2022, Warman announced his retirement from ITV News Central, after a career spanning 49 years, and presented his last edition on 4 July 2022.

Warman was appointed Member of the Order of the British Empire (MBE) in the 2022 Birthday Honours for services to broadcasting and journalism in the West Midlands.
