= The Price Is Right (British game show) =

British television quiz show

- Also known as: The New Price Is Right; Bruce's Price Is Right
- Genre: Game show
- Created by: Bob Stewart
- Presented by: Bruce Forsyth; Leslie Crowther; Bob Warman; Joe Pasquale; Alan Carr
- Announcer: Simon Prebble; Bobby Bragg; Al Sherwin; Peter Dickson; Mike Hurley; Tony Hirst; John Sachs
- Country of origin: United Kingdom
- Original language: English
- No. of series: 5 (Leslie Crowther); 1 (Bob Warman); 7 (Bruce Forsyth); 1 (Joe Pasquale)
- No. of episodes: 100 (Leslie Crowther); 250+ (Bob Warman); 116 (3 unaired) (Bruce Forsyth); 124 (Joe Pasquale); 1 (Alan Carr)

Production
- Production locations: Television House (1984–88); The Leeds Studios (1995–2001); Granada Studios (2006–07); Dock10 (2017)
- Running time: 60 minutes (inc. adverts) (1984–88, 2006–07, 2017); 30 minutes (inc. adverts) (1989–90, 1995–2001, 2006)
- Production companies: Central in association with Mark Goodson Productions and Talbot Television (1984–88); Talbot Telegame and Mark Goodson Productions (1989–90); Yorkshire Television and Talbot Television in association with Mark Goodson Productions (1995–96); Yorkshire Television and Fremantle (UK) Productions (Grundy) (1996–2001); Talkback Thames (2006–07); Thames (2017)

Original release
- Network: ITV
- Release: 24 March 1984 – 8 April 1988
- Network: Sky One
- Release: 4 September 1989 – 31 August 1990
- Network: ITV
- Release: 4 September 1995 – 16 December 2001
- Release: 8 May 2006 – 12 January 2007
- Network: Channel 4
- Release: 30 December 2017

Related
- The Price Is Right

The Price Is Right is a British television game show based on the American version of the same name. It originally aired on ITV from 24 March 1984 to 8 April 1988 and was hosted by Leslie Crowther. The show later briefly moved to Sky One for one series as The New Price Is Right from 4 September 1989 to 31 August 1990 with Bob Warman as the host.

The show returned to ITV, as Bruce's Price Is Right, from 4 September 1995 to 16 December 2001, with Bruce Forsyth hosting for seven series consisting of 116 episodes. Another series aired from 8 May 2006 until 12 January 2007, this time hosted by Joe Pasquale. Two one-off specials aired as part of ITV's Gameshow Marathon in September 2005 and April 2007. On 30 December 2017, it was revived for a one-off pilot hosted by Alan Carr on Channel 4.

In June 2019, it was announced that The Price Is Right had been chosen as one of the country's five all-time favourite game shows to be "supersized and rebooted" in new series Alan Carr's Epic Gameshow commissioned by ITV. A seven-episode series was filmed at dock10 studios and broadcast in May 2020.

== Crowther era (The Price Is Right) ==
Logo from Leslie Crowther-era.

Leslie Crowther hosted the original UK version, having beaten Joe Brown to the role of host after both recorded pilot episodes. It was also notable for being produced by William G. Stewart (of later Fifteen to One fame), who made the occasional cameo appearance. The Crowther version is popular with fans of the show for its near-campiness, frenetic pace, glamour, and the endearing presentation skills of its host, not for its cheaper prizes (which were forced on it by the Independent Broadcasting Authority's prize limits). Its format was nearly identical to that of CBS's daytime show in the United States. It initially used the Big Wheel to decide who would go through to the Range Finder (Scoring 100 won £500 and a bonus spin which awarded an additional £1,000 for spinning 100 or £250 for landing on an adjacent section), but the IBA forced Central to abandon this because of the lack of pricing skill involved. While the show had to go off air for a while during its first season due to an electricians' strike, the format was adapted to fit into a much more tightly regulated UK broadcasting environment.

After this ruling was made, the show replaced the Big Wheel rounds with a game called "Supermarket", a game loosely based on the American version's "Grocery Game" pricing game. The three contestants were shown an assortment of small retail items, such as groceries or hardware, and had 15 seconds to select up to four apiece. Duplicates of each item were provided to allow multiple contestants to select the same one if desired; however, contestants could take no more than one of any item. The prices of the chosen items were revealed and added up, and the contestant who came the closest to £20 (high or low) advanced to the Showcase.

Series two saw the Big Wheel return for a spin-off to see who would have the option of bidding or passing on the first showcase; each contestant had to take two spins. If a person scored 100, £400 would be donated to charity on their behalf, and Leslie would ask the person a consumer-related question to win £100 for him/herself. The winner was the contestant who came closer to 100 in either direction.

The Crowther version later replaced Supermarket and the Big Wheel called with the "Showcase Showdown", where all six on-stage contestants played a series of estimated-guess questions and the person farthest away from the actual prize was eliminated. This was done until the last two contestants were left, and they then advanced to the Range Finder (by now simply called the "Showcase Final".)

The final round, the Range Finder, was played largely the same way as on the Showcase finale on the American version. In the first season, the winner would not win the largest prize in their showcase if their winning guess was not within 10% of the showcase total. In subsequent seasons, the game was played with 1972–74 United States rules (no Double Showcase rule), while it did use the rule for a double overbid.

=== Pricing Games ===
- Any Number (used numbers 1–9 with all values having three digits each)
- Bargain Bar ("Barker's Bargain Bar" in the U.S.)
- Blank Cheque (Now known as "Check Game" in the U.S.)
- Bonus Game
- (The) Card Game
- Check-Out
- Cliffhanger ("Cliff Hangers" in the U.S.)
- (The) Clock Game
- Danger Price (only the non-Danger Price items can be won)
- Dice Game
- Escalator ("Walk of Fame" in the U.S., except only one prize could be won; the player had to choose whether to keep the last item won or try for the next one)
- Five Price Tags
- Give or Keep
- Hi Lo (played with small prizes instead of grocery items.)
- Hole in One
- Lucky 7 (played with seven £1 coins for a prize with a three-digit price.)
- Master Key
- Matchmaker (not based on any U.S. game; a pricing game in name only, as it actually involved memory, with six prizes available.)
- Money Game (played for a vehicle with a three-digit price. Also, there is no consolation prize like the US version, making the game name an artifact)
- Most Expensive (an original game later introduced in the US as "Easy as 1, 2, 3"; not the U.S.'s "Most Expensive"; contestants only won the most expensive prize.)
- One Away
- Partners (loosely based on The Phone Home Game.)
- The Penny Drops ("Penny Ante" in the U.S.)
- Permutation (not based on any U.S. game; played much like Balance Game II.)
- Pick-a-Pair (played with small prizes instead of grocery items.)
- Punch a Bunch (contestant won the chance to win cash prizes from a collection of hidden IOU's behind a screen, if they chose an IOU of zero value, the game ended)
- Race Game (contestant had to match the prices of four prizes to cards given by Crowther against the clock in 45 seconds)
- Range Game
- Safecracker ("Safe Crackers" in the U.S.)
- Secret X (contestant has three chances to win up to two X's in addition to the one given at the outset.)
- Side by Side (not based on any US game; not related to the U.S.'s Side by Side in any way.)
- Squeeze Play (played for a three-digit prize; players remove two numbers instead of one from a set of five digits or one number from a set of four.)
- Switcheroo (played for four two-digit prizes and one three-digit prize.)
- Take Two
- Temptation
- Ten Chances (played for two two-digit prizes and one three-digit prize.)
- 3 in a Row (not based on any U.S. game; played for a three-digit prize, using a grid of nine two-digit prizes.)
- 3 Strikes
- Tic~Tac~Toe (functionally a variation on Joker with the pricing portion of On the Nose.)
- Time-Play (a variation on Clock Game; played for three three-digit prizes in ascending order of price.)
- Trade Up ("Trader Bob" in the U.S.)

=== Announcer ===
- Simon Prebble (1984–1988)

=== Models ===
- Marie-Elise Grepne (1984–1985)
- Jacqueline Bucknell (1984–1986)
- Julia Roberts (1984–1986)
- Denise Kelly (1984–1988)
- Sandra Easby (1985)
- Cindy Day (1986–1988)
- Carol Greenwood (1986–1988)
- Gillian de Terville (1986–1988)
- Elsa O'Toole (1986)
- Judy Bailey (1986–1988)
- Laura Calland (1987–1988)
- Sarah Wynter (1988)

== Warman era (The New Price Is Right) ==
Logo from Bob Warman-era.

The second version hosted by Bob Warman is considered to be a precursor to the third version hosted by Bruce Forsyth, as it was a half-hour and used the Showcase range game. Having premiered shortly after Leslie Crowther's version went off the air, it retained many elements from the set and props, but was somewhat "Americanized". The show was hence called "The New Price Is Right" and had a red, yellow and green pound sign. The Warman version also had slightly better and more expensive prizes than the Crowther version due to the program's shorter length, in-show sponsorship, and lighter government regulation of satellite television channels. The show also had a light border in the opening (mimicking the American version), used US music (including the opening theme, the Match Game-Hollywood Squares Hour theme and Concentration car cues, to name a few), and had more colour on the set.

The Showcase round was played considerably differently: After three games and a single Showcase Showdown at the Big Wheel (in which spinning 100 earned a bonus spin worth a bonus prize), the Showdown winner selected a range at random from £250 to £1,000; if the bid was within the selected range of the price of the presented showcase without going over, they won the Showcase.

=== Pricing Games ===
- Bargain Bar
- Cliffhanger
- Danger Price
- Five Price Tags (played with grocery items, and players are given a free pick at the start.)
- Hi Lo
- Lucky 7 (played with seven tokens.)
- Money Game (played for a car, as in America.)
- Pick-a-Pair (played with grocery items.)
- Plinko
- Race Game
- Side by Side (not based on any American pricing game, including "Side by Side".)
- Switcheroo
- Temptation
- Ten Chances

=== Announcers ===
- Bobby Bragg
- Al Sherwin

=== Models ===
- Suzie Marlowe
- Tracie Williams
- Katrina Maltby
- Julie Broster
- Peitra Caston

== Forsyth era (Bruce's Price Is Right) ==
Logo for the Bruce Forsyth-era.

When it started in 1995, Bruce's Price Is Right was one of the first shows to fully take advantage of the Independent Television Commission's lifting of the prize limits and the general deregulation of the UK broadcasting environment. The Showcase Showdown was played on the Big Wheel (objections to lack of skill no longer being a factor), with the highest-scoring contestant on one spin or a combination of two spins going through to the Range Finder, and any contestant who scored 100 on one spin or a combination of two spins would win £1,000. The ranges for the Range Finder in this version went from £1,000 to £5,000. (Unlike the other three versions, this version did not involve any bonus spin.)

Although, it was only in a half-hour format with three pricing games per show (the Crowther show had been an hour long with six games), it still gave away more valuable prizes each week than the previous ITV version had done (for example, it was possible for a contestant to win two cars, one in a pricing game and one in the showcase, which would have been utterly unthinkable on British TV in the 1980s). Cars offered were usually superminis, from makers like Daihatsu and Daewoo, or models like a Ford Ka or Mazda Demio, but small sports cars like a Hyundai Accent or Vauxhall Tigra were offered on occasion.

On the Forsyth version, the game Plinko was played to very different rules from the US version; considerably less money could be won, and contestants could risk their cash winnings on one final Plinko chip in hopes of adding a car or other large prize to their winnings (the cash spaces on the board were replaced with alternating "WIN" and "LOSE" tags). Landing on "LOSE" would lose all the money accumulated, while landing on "WIN" won the car or other large prize plus the money. (Ant and Dec's Gameshow Marathon used these rules for their playing of Plinko, with an extra choice of a pound sign in addition to "WIN" and "LOSE", so that landing in the pound sign slot would double the winnings. Vernon Kay's extra chip, however, landed in a "WIN" slot.)

Many European versions of the show that debuted after the Forsyth version based their games and sound cues on that show. The main theme, an update of the US theme, and the "come on down" music are from the short-lived 1994 US syndicated version.

Forsyth initially opened this version with a modified version of his trademark line of "Nice to see you, to see you...NICE!" (where the audience yells the word "nice" at the end) adding "...and it's nice to meet the stars of our show, whoever you are!" In later series the original line was used, followed by "Let's meet the stars of our show, whoever you are!"

The Forsyth incarnation was a co-production between Yorkshire Television and Fremantle (UK) Productions (formerly Talbot Television), and not made by Central like its predecessor.

=== Pricing games ===
Introduced in series 1 (1995)

- Cliffhanger ("Cliff Hangers" in the US; contestants were told that the prices increased as the game progressed.)
- Clock Game (rules modified after Series 1 so that all prizes ended in either '0' or '5'.)
- Danger Price (contestant could not win the prize that cost the danger price.)
- Double Price Tags ("Double Prices" in the US.)
- Hole in One (played with four small prizes instead of six grocery products, uses two-putt rule.)
- Master Key
- Money Game
- Most Expensive (contestant only won the most expensive prize.)
- One Right Price (regularly played for two cars, though the contestant could only choose one.)
- Pathfinder
- Pick-a-Pair (played with the prizes themselves instead of with grocery products.)
- Plinko
- Race Game (played with a 30-second timer.)
- Secret "X" (except on earliest playings, contestants had three chances to win the two additional Xs.)
- Swap ("Switch?" in the US; contestant could only win one prize they would choose.)
- Switcheroo (a non-car game)

Introduced in series 2 (1996)

- Check-Out
- Lucky Seven (modified so that no numbers appeared in the price more than once.)
- Make Your Move
- Pick-a-Number

Introduced in series 3 (1997)

- Credit Card (contestant won the three prizes they picked, and only one prize can create a loss and may still win the game; rules modified later on so that they also kept the remaining money on the card)
- Most Expensive (replaced original "Most Expensive" from Series 1; now a renamed version of "Easy as 1, 2, 3".)
- Split Decision (used the game's timed format.)
- Three Strikes ('one strike in the bag' rule implemented from Series 5 onward.)

Introduced in series 4 (1998)

- Any Number
- Bruce's Bargain Bar ("Barker's Bargain Bar" in the US, contestant only won one of the prizes.)
- Hi Lo (played for two prizes, contestants chose one prize if game was won.)

Introduced in series 5 (1999)

- Joker
- Side by Side
- Price Tags ("Barker's Markers"/"Make Your Mark" in the US)

Introduced in series 6 (2000)

- Clearance Sale
- Let 'em Roll (except on earliest playings, the number of rolls was determined using a grocery product and three price choices.)
- Push Over (the blocks went "to Australia" according to Bruce.)

Introduced in series 7 (2001)

- No new games were introduced.

=== Announcer ===
- Peter Dickson (1995–2001)

=== Models ===
- Kimberley Cowell (1995–2001)
- Emma Noble (1995–1998)
- Emma Steadman (1995–2001)
- Brian Tattersall (1995–1998)
- Simon Peat (1998–2001)
- Lea Kristensen (1998–2001)

== Ant and Dec's Gameshow Marathon (The Price Is Right) ==
On 17 September 2005, as part of a celebration of the 50th birthday of ITV, Ant & Dec hosted a one-off revival of The Price Is Right as part of Ant & Dec's Gameshow Marathon; they also hosted revivals of several other game shows that were once popular on the ITV network. The original titles were from the Central version, however the Yorkshire Television logo was used instead.

=== Announcer ===
- Peter Dickson (2005)

=== Games played ===
- Cliffhanger (Carol Vorderman); game won
- Plinko (Vernon Kay); gamble taken and extra prize (car) won
- Race Game (Ruby Wax); one prize out of four won

=== Other results ===
Carol Vorderman won the Showcase Showdown and proceeded to win her showcase.

== Pasquale era (The Price Is Right) ==
Logo from Joe Pasquale-era.

Talkback Thames debuted a revival on ITV on 8 May 2006, this time with former I'm a Celebrity...Get Me Out of Here! winner Joe Pasquale as host. It followed the same gameplay format as Bob Warman and Bruce Forsyth's versions, with Range Finder ranges going from £500 to £3000 (sometimes £4000), and the Showcase Showdown adapted the bonus spin from the Warman version, with a car at stake; later replaced by the £1000 bonus. It had a very "panto" feel to it, and it relies on nostalgia of the Crowther version, which was known for its cheap prizes because of the regulations of the time. Joe's tour manager, Ray Tizzard, made appearances as his "twin" in various pricing games.

The show expanded to an hour from 3 July 2006. This involved three games being played, a Showcase Showdown, three more games, another Showcase Showdown, and then, the winners from both showdowns take part in the 'Pasquale Finale', a spin-off on the wheel to see who will go through to the Range Finder. In addition, prior to this, the maximum range in the Range Finder increased to £4000, as the budget increased.

After the first three games and Showcase Showdown, Contestants' Row was cleared of people, and a new set of four contestants was called down. (This differs from the US version, which keeps all contestants in Contestants' Row who do not go on stage.)

In all versions of the programme, a perfect bid in Contestants' Row resulted in a £100 bonus in either cash or, in the Warman version, gift certificates.

=== Pricing Games ===
- Any Number
- Cliffhanger ("Cliff Hangers" in the US.)
- Danger Price
- Deck of Cards ("Card Game" in the US; introduced when the show went hour-long.)
- Easy as 1, 2, 3
- Find the Lady ("Shell Game" in the US, played here with playing cards, including a Queen.)
- Half & Half ("Money Game" in the US.)
- Hi Lo
- Hole in One
- Joe's Bargain Bar ("Barker's Bargain Bar" in the US.)
- Joe's Lucky Bag ("3 Strikes" in the US.)
- Joe Ker (introduced when the show went hour-long; known as "Joker" in the US.)
- Lucky 7 ("Lucky Seven" in the US; introduced when the show went hour-long; follows the same rules as Bruce Forsyth's version, although not always played for a car.)
- On the Nose
- One Right Price (not the US' 1 Right Price; actually more similar to the US' Double Prices, with three choices, so you could call it "Triple Prices".)
- One Wrong Price
- Pick a Number
- Pick-a-Pair (played with only four items.)
- Plinko
- Price Tags ("Five Price Tags" in the US; introduced when the show went hour-long.)
- Push Over
- Safecracker ("Safe Crackers" in the US.)
- Side by Side
- Swap ("Switch?" in the US; like Bruce Forsyth's version, contestants can only win one prize, and they select the one they want.)
- Take 2
- Walk the Line (the grocery portion of Let 'em Roll with five items; based on the high-low game on Play Your Cards Right with prices of grocery items instead of playing cards; to win, a contestant must correctly run the board with no mistakes.)

=== Announcers ===
- Peter Dickson (2006–2007)
- Mike Hurley (2006–2007) (occasional cover for Peter Dickson)

=== Models ===
- Natalie Denning (2006–2007)
- Amanda Robbins (2006–2007)
- Richard Kyte (2006–2007)
- Natalie Pike (2006–2007)

=== Merchandise ===
A DVD game based on this version of the show was released by Circle Studio in November 2006.

=== Cancellation ===
ITV chiefs cancelled The Price Is Right at the end of its latest run on 12 January 2007, citing the fact that while The Paul O'Grady Show on Channel 4 regularly attracted over 2.5 million viewers, Pasquale only managed to pull in 800,000.

== Vernon Kay's Gameshow Marathon (The Price Is Right) ==
After the success of Ant & Dec's Gameshow Marathon in 2005, ITV brought the show back, this time hosted by Vernon Kay, a contestant in the first series. Vernon Kay's Gameshow Marathon began on 7 April 2007 with The Price Is Right.

=== Contestants ===
- Michael Le Vell (Coronation Street actor)
- Jamelia (Singer)
- Graeme Le Saux (Footballer)
- Wendy Richard (Former EastEnders actress)
- Ben Shephard (TV presenter)
- Andrea Catherwood (The Sunday Edition presenter)

The winner of the show was Graeme Le Saux, who as a result advanced to the quarter-final of the show. The five remaining contestants returned in the next week's show, Blockbusters, to battle for the second spot in the quarter-final round.

=== Announcer ===
- Peter Dickson (2007)

== Carr era (The Price Is Right) ==
On 30 December 2017, the revival was a one-off pilot filmed at Dock10 studios that aired as a Christmas special on Channel 4 hosted by Alan Carr and was announced by Tony Hirst. According to a press release by FremantleMedia, Carr said "I'm so excited to be the new host of The Price Is Right. It's proper bucket list territory for me as I loved it when I was growing up and now for me to be at the helm of such a legendary show is a dream come true. It just leaves me with one thing to say … COME ON DOWN!". Viewers had praised Carr's hosting ability as they took it to Twitter by demanding it to become a full series. However, it has been declined since then.

After five pricing games (Cliffhangers, Pay the Rent, Plinko, Bonkers and Clock Game), those five players spun the wheel with the Showcase Showdown winner going through to the Showcase Final which was played exactly the same way as on Bruce’s Price Is Right. Scoring exactly 100 on the wheel won £100. A tie would be broken via spin-off with no bonus for spinning 100.

=== Announcer ===
- Tony Hirst

=== Models ===
- Nichola Dixon
- Dorretta Maynard
- Zoe Nicholas

== Alan Carr's Epic Gameshow (The Price Is Right) ==
On 30 May 2019, ITV ordered a series called Alan Carr's Epic Gameshow (also known as Epic Gameshow) hosted by Alan Carr and filmed at dock10 studios, who had previously hosted a reboot of The Price Is Right on Channel 4 in 2017 where like Gameshow Marathon, it would see five classic game shows being supersized and brought back such as Play Your Cards Right, The Price Is Right, Take Your Pick, Strike it Lucky and Bullseye. However, unlike GSM this would feature only civilian contestants hoping to win either a big cash reward or top of the range prizes instead of celebrities playing for their favourite charities along with a viewer at home (except the first episode which was Play Your Cards Right).

According to the press release, Carr said: "It is such a privilege for me to be involved in these truly iconic shows that have brought so much joy to my childhood. A little bit nostalgia but a whole load of fun. Big shoes to fill I know, these shows should be back on telly for a whole new generation to sit down and enjoy with their family just like I did all those years ago!"

Intended for April 2020, the show was broadcast on 6 June 2020. Just like the regular editions from the 80s, 90s and the early 2000s, the episode featured regular civilians as contestants with an exact bid in contestant's row earning that contestant £200.

=== Pricing games ===
The five pricing games that were played in the episode were:

1. Cliffhangers
2. Hole in One
3. Any Number
4. Plinko
5. Push Over

In Cliffhangers, the face of the mountain climber is supposed to resemble its host Alan Carr, it also never revealed the actual price of the Popcorn Maker after the contestant's win when it was in fact £50

=== Announcer ===
- John Sachs (2020)

=== Models ===
- Matt Peacock (2020)
- Rachel Trevaskis (2020)
- Kimberley Williams (2020)

The three players closest to each item up for bids got to spin the big wheel in which 100 won only £1000.

=== Epic Showcase ===
Similar to the Warman era, the biggest difference here is that there were no random range choice of any kind as the range was a flat £3000 but still coming within the range without going over won the showcase.

== Transmissions ==
=== Crowther era (The Price Is Right) ===
Series	Start date	End date	Episodes
1	24 March 1984	16 June 1984	9
2	29 December 1984	15 June 1985	25
3	18 January 1986	21 June 1986	23
4	22 November 1986	23 May 1987	25
5	27 November 1987	8 April 1988	18

=== Warman era (The New Price Is Right) ===
Series	Start date	End date	Episodes
1	4 September 1989	31 August 1990	250+

=== Forsyth era (Bruce's Price Is Right) ===
Series	Start date	End date	Episodes
1	4 September 1995	1 January 1996	17
1	27 December 1996		17
2	2 September 1996	23 December 1996	17
3	29 August 1997	9 January 1998	17
4	4 September 1998	15 January 1999	17
5	10 September 1999	4 September 2000	17
6	8 September 2000	16 December 2000	17
7	23 June 2001	16 December 2001	14

(Series 7 also had 17 editions, but three of these were not screened nationally - they were shown however in 2002 in a daytime slot on STV, Grampian and UTV)

=== Pasquale era (The Price Is Right) ===
Series	Start date	End date	Episodes
1	8 May 2006	12 January 2007	124

=== Carr era (The Price Is Right) ===
Series	Start date	End date	Episodes
1	30 December 2017		1
