= Cindy Fisher (actress) =

American actress

Cindy Fisher is an American stage, film and television actress.

== Career ==
Fisher is best known for the role of Rebecca in the soap opera The Young and the Restless, in which she starred in the early 1980s. While working on the show she met actor Doug Davidson, who became her husband in 1984. They have two children, Calyssa and Caden. After The Young and the Restless she starred in several films and TV movies, including leading roles in the drama Liar's Moon (1982), alongside Matt Dillon, and in the television film Intimate Agony (1983), one of the first movies to be themed on the disease herpes. She was featured in the soap opera Days of Our Lives, in which she played the role of Patti Griffin between 1978 and 1979 and the role of Diane Parker in 1984. She was a character named Nancy in a Waltons episode entitled "The Lie" which first aired 1/2/1975.

Her other film credits include roles in Bad Ronald (1974), Hometown U.S.A. (1979), The Blues Brothers (1980), Airplane II: The Sequel (1982), and The Stone Boy (1984). Her stage work includes Cat on a Hot Tin Roof, Annie Get Your Gun, Summer and Smoke, and Twelfth Night.

== Filmography ==
=== Film ===
Year	Title	Role	Notes
1975	The Swiss Family Robinson	Helga Wagner	
1979	Hometown U.S.A.	Ginger	
1980	The Blues Brothers	Daughter #2	
1981	Liar's Moon	Ginny Peterson	
1982	Airplane II: The Sequel	I don't want to sound forward	Uncredited
1984	The Stone Boy	Amalie	

=== Television ===
Year	Title	Role	Notes
1972, 1975	The Waltons	Nancy Madden	2 episodes
1974	The ABC Afternoon Playbreak	Tracy Davenport	Episode: "Miss Kline, We Love You"
1974	Bad Ronald	Babs Wood	Television film
1977	Police Story	Annie	Episode: "Ice Time"
1977	Rafferty	Bonnie Milligan	Episode: "Brothers & Sons"
1977–1978	Days of Our Lives	Patti Griffin	26 episodes
1978	More Than Friends	Wind	Television film
1980	The Incredible Hulk	Mickey	Episode: "Falling Angels"
1980–1987	The Young and the Restless	Dana / Rebecca	14 episodes
1981	Hellinger's Law	Jill Gronouski	Television film
1981	Hill Street Blues	Laurie	Episode: "The Second Oldest Profession"
1982	Strike Force	Sunset	Episode: "Fallen Angel"
1982	Teachers Only	Ginger Peterson	Episode: "Diana, Substitute Mother"
1982	Family Ties	Kimberly Blanton	Episode: "Pilot"
1983	Intimate Agony	Kate Fairmont	Television film
1984	You Are the Jury	Dorothy Landrum	Episode: "The Case of the People of Florida vs. Joseph Landrum"
1985	T. J. Hooker	Yvonne Winslow	Episode: "Trackdown"
1985	Cover Up	Sally Benson	Episode: "Adams' Ribs"
1986	Remington Steele	Cindy Wellington	Episode: "Steele at Your Service"
1986	Magnum, P.I.	Patty 'Bunny' Emory	Episode: "Straight and Narrow"
1986, 1987	Murder, She Wrote	Nancy Bates / Linda Bonner	2 episodes
