= Doug Davidson =

American television actor (born 1954)

- Born: Douglas Donald Davidson; October 24, 1954 (age 71); Glendale, California, U.S.
- Occupation: Actor
- Years active: 1978–present
- Known for: Paul Williams on The Young and the Restless
- Spouse: Cindy Fisher (m. 1984)
- Children: 2 (including Calyssa)

Douglas Donald Davidson (born October 24, 1954) is an American television actor. He has portrayed Paul Williams on the CBS soap opera The Young and the Restless from 1978 to 2020, making him one of the soaps' longest-serving cast members.

== Career ==
Davidson appeared as captain of The Young and the Restless team when they played for charity on Family Feud several times from 1989 until 1995. Through connections he made during those appearances, Davidson eventually got a position hosting a five-night-a-week, syndicated, half-hour version of the game show The New Price Is Right, beginning on September 12, 1994. The show was canceled just four and a half months later on January 27, 1995. Davidson was one of a few people given an audition to replace Bob Barker after his retirement from The Price Is Right on June 15, 2007, a role which ultimately went to Drew Carey. Davidson has also hosted the live stage show adaptation, The Price Is Right Live!, at Harrah's-owned casinos in Las Vegas, Nevada. Davidson appeared in the 1996 pilot of the classic game show Card Sharks hosted by Tom Green (not to be confused with the formerly popular MTV personality of the same name) as a video clip in the bonus round.

From 1998 through 2003, Davidson served as a host of the annual Tournament of Roses Parade.

On September 12, 2018, it was reported that Davidson's contract was not renewed. Davidson confirmed that he was "not included" in the new direction for The Young and the Restless. In a turnaround following the departure of executive producer and head writer Mal Young, CBS announced on February 19, 2019 that Davidson would be returning to the role.

== Personal life ==
He has been married to actress Cindy Fisher since 1984. They have two children, daughter Calyssa and son Caden.

== Filmography ==
Year	Title	Role	Notes
1977	Fraternity Row	Collin	
1978	The Initiation of Sarah	Tommy	TV movie
1978–2020	The Young and the Restless	Paul Williams	Contract role: 1978–2018; Recurring role: 2018–2020
1987	I'll Take Manhattan	Male Model	TV miniseries
1994	Mr. Write	Roger	
1994–95	The New Price Is Right	Host	Syndicated, half-hour version
1995	Diagnosis: Murder	Doug Davidson	Episode: "Death in the Daytime"
1997	L.A. Johns	Roger Langley	TV movie
1999	Dreaming of Joseph Lees	Saxophone Player	
2013	Next Week's Game	Dad	Short film

== Awards and nominations ==
List of acting awards and nominations
Year	Award	Category	Title	Result	Ref.
1986	Soap Opera Digest Award	Outstanding Young Lead Actor	The Young and the Restless	Nominated	
1988	Soap Opera Digest Award	Outstanding Hero: Daytime	The Young and the Restless	Nominated	
1990	Soap Opera Digest Award	Outstanding Hero: Daytime	The Young and the Restless	Won	
1991	Soap Opera Digest Award	Outstanding Hero: Daytime	The Young and the Restless	Won	
1992	Soap Opera Digest Award	Outstanding Supporting Actor: Daytime	The Young and the Restless	Won	
1997	Soap Opera Digest Award	Outstanding Supporting Actor: Daytime	The Young and the Restless	Won	
2003	Daytime Emmy Award	Outstanding Lead Actor in a Drama Series	The Young and the Restless	Nominated	
2010	Daytime Emmy Award	Outstanding Lead Actor in a Drama Series	The Young and the Restless	Nominated	
2011	Daytime Emmy Award	Outstanding Supporting Actor in a Drama Series	The Young and the Restless	Nominated	
2013	Daytime Emmy Award	Outstanding Lead Actor in a Drama Series	The Young and the Restless	Won	
2014	Daytime Emmy Award	Outstanding Lead Actor in a Drama Series	The Young and the Restless	Nominated	
