= List of The Price Is Right pricing games =

Pricing games are featured on the current version of the American game show The Price Is Right. The contestant from Contestants' Row who bids closest to the price of a prize without going over wins the prize and has the chance to win additional prizes or cash in an onstage game. After the pricing game ends, a new contestant is selected for Contestants' Row and the process is repeated. Six pricing games are played on each hour-long episode. Prior to expanding to one hour in length, three games per episode were played during the half-hour format.

A total of 113 pricing games have been played on the show, 76 of which are in the current rotation. On a typical hour-long episode, two games—one in each half of the show—will be played for a car, at most one game will be played for a cash prize and the other games will offer merchandise or trips. Usually, one of the six games will involve grocery products, while another will involve smaller prizes that can be used to win a larger prize package.

Some rules of pricing games have been modified over the years due to the effects of inflation. On the 1994 syndicated version hosted by Doug Davidson, the rules of several games were modified. Notably, the grocery products used in some games on the daytime version were replaced by small merchandise prizes, generally valued less than $100. Other certain episodes—including The Price Is Right $1,000,000 Spectacular that aired in 2008, and special weeks such as Big Money Week and Dream Car Week—also featured temporary rule changes to some pricing games. The names of some games are occasionally changed for episodes with specific themes, such as Earth Day, Halloween, and College Day.

== Active games ==
=== A ===
==== Any Number ====
A gameboard contains spaces representing five digits in the price of a car, three digits in the price of a smaller prize, and three digits representing an amount of money (less than $10, in dollars and cents) in a piggy bank. The first digit in the price of the car is revealed at the beginning of the game (a rule implemented after cars valued at more than $10,000 were used in the game). The digits 0 through 9 each appear once in the remaining ten spaces, including a duplicate of the first digit in the price of the car. The contestant calls out digits one at a time, revealing them in the prices of the prizes on the gameboard, and wins the first prize whose price is completely revealed.

=== B ===
==== Back to '76 ====
Three small prizes that first appeared on the show 50 years earlier are displayed on a turntable housed inside a stylized vintage television set. The contestant has to guess the price of each individual item from that year. The contestant turns a knob on the television to dial in their guess for each price, using a $50 range for the first two prizes and a $100 range for the third. The contestant wins a large, modern prize if the total difference of their guesses and the actual prices of the items does not exceed $50.

The game debuted under the name Back to '72 during the show's 50th season. It returned in January 2023 as Back to '73 and has since been added to the current pricing game lineup, with the name being updated each year.

==== Balance Game ====
A prop bag of money representing the last three digits in the price of a prize is placed on one side of a balance scale. The contestant is then shown three more bags, each representing a different value in multiples of $1,000, and must choose two of them to place on that same side so that the total of all three bags equals their guess at the correct price. A bag representing the full price is then placed on the other side of the scale. The contestant wins the prize if the two sides balance.

==== Bargain Game ====
Two prizes are shown, each displaying a bargain price lower than its actual retail price. The contestant wins both prizes by choosing the one that has been marked down farther from retail.

The game was known as Barker's Bargain Bar, named for previous host Bob Barker, until it was removed from rotation on December 5, 2008. The game returned on April 10, 2012 after a hiatus and was renamed Bargain Game, with a new set.

==== Bonkers ====
A gameboard displays an incorrect four-digit price for a prize and contains eight spaces: one space above and one space below each digit. The contestant is given four markers to place on the board and has 30 seconds to determine whether each correct digit in the price of the prize is higher or lower than the digit displayed, placing a marker above or below the incorrect digit to denote their choice. The contestant then presses a button. The contestant wins the prize if the guessed pattern is correct. If the guess is incorrect, a buzzer sounds and the contestant must try again, not knowing how many digits are wrong or which ones. Changes can be made until the contestant finds the right pattern or until time has expired.

==== Bonus Game ====
The contestant is asked whether each of four small prizes is priced higher or lower than the incorrect price given. Each prize corresponds to one of four windows on a gameboard, one of which conceals the word "Bonus", and each correct guess wins the small prize and control of the window. The contestant wins a large bonus prize by controlling the window containing the word "Bonus".

==== Bullseye ====
Five grocery items are shown, and the contestant is asked to purchase a quantity of a single item such that the total price is between $10 and $12. The contestant may make three attempts, each with a different item, and immediately wins the game by succeeding on any one attempt. If the total for an item is between $2 and $9.99, the host places a marker on a target-shaped gameboard to indicate it. If the total is less than $2 or over $12, no marker is placed.

One item has a bullseye hidden behind its price tag. If the contestant fails to reach the $10–$12 range on all three attempts, the contestant can still win if the hidden bullseye is behind the price tag of an item for which the contestant earned a marker on the target.

Originally, the target featured a $5 to $10 range, with $9 to $10 as the bullseye range. Shortly thereafter, the target became $1 to $6, with a $5 to $6 bullseye range.

=== C ===
==== Card Game ====
The contestant uses playing cards from a standard deck to bid on a car. Before playing the game, the contestant draws a card from another deck to determine how close their bid must be to the actual price, without going over, in order to win. The contestant's bid starts at the set price and increases as the contestant draws cards. Face cards add $1,000 and numbered cards add their face value multiplied by $100. Aces are wild and can either be played immediately or held aside. When the contestant chooses to stop drawing cards, the price of the car is revealed. The contestant wins the car if the bid is within the target range without going over.

==== Check Game ====
The contestant is shown a prize and asked to write an amount on an oversized blank check made out in their name. The value of the prize is then added to the amount written on the check. The contestant wins both the prize and the cash amount of the check if the total falls between $8,000 and $9,000.

==== Check-Out ====
The contestant is asked to individually price five grocery items. After all five guesses are tallied, the total of the contestant's guesses is revealed, then the actual prices of the items are revealed. The contestant wins a bonus prize if their cumulative total is within $2.00 of the actual total price of the five grocery items (high or low).

==== Cliff Hangers ====
The contestant faces a gameboard consisting of a mountain slope divided into 25 steps, with a figure of a climber at its base and a cliff at the top. The contestant must guess the retail prices of three small prizes, one at a time. The climber moves one step up the slope for every dollar the contestant is off, high or low, and the correct price is not revealed until after the climber has either stopped or fallen off the cliff. The contestant wins the three small prizes and a larger prize if the total of the contestant's errors on all three guesses is no more than $25. If the climber falls off the cliff, the game ends and the contestant wins only the small prizes priced before exceeding $25.

==== Clock Game ====
The game is played for three prizes. The actual price of the first prize is shown to the studio and home audiences. After the contestant gives their first bid, a 30-second clock is started and the host tells the contestant whether the actual price is higher or lower than the bid. The contestant continues to bid, responding to the host's clues, until either the contestant wins by correctly guessing the price of the prize or the time expires. If time remains after the first prize is won, the process is repeated for the second prize. A bonus prize is awarded if the contestant prices both prizes within 30 seconds. Unlike other pricing games, the audience is required to remain silent while the contestant is making their bids.

==== Coming or Going ====
The contestant is shown a prize and the numbers in a four-digit price, which are displayed on a shelf as tiles that are strung together. The shelf can be tilted in two directions ("coming" or "going"), producing two possible prices, one being the reverse of the other. In order to win the prize, the contestant must tilt the shelf in the right direction.

==== Cover Up ====
Five spaces are shown on a gameboard. Above each space are numbers: two above the first space, three above the second space and so on up to six above the fifth space. The contestant is asked to choose a number in each column to create a price for a car. If any of the digits are correct, they are lit and the contestant then covers each incorrect digit with a new choice from its column. The game continues until the contestant either wins by getting all five digits correct, or loses by providing a price in which no new digits are correct.

=== D ===
==== Danger Price ====
The contestant is shown four prizes and a "danger price," which is the price of one of them. To win all four prizes, the contestant must select the three that do not match the danger price.

==== Dice Game ====
The game is played for a car with a price that only contains the digits one through six among the last four digits. The first digit of the price is revealed, and the contestant rolls four dice on a gaming table, one at a time. The table has a line painted across its width near the end opposite the contestant, and a die must land entirely across the line in order to count. Each die corresponds to one of the remaining digits in the price. If the contestant rolls the actual digit, it is revealed on a gameboard. Otherwise, they must guess whether the correct digit is higher or lower than the one rolled. Any incorrect roll of one or six is defaulted to "higher" or "lower" respectively. The contestant wins the car by guessing correctly and/or getting an exact roll on all four missing digits.

Prior to 1977, the car price occasionally included zeros and digits higher than six.

==== Do the Math ====
A contestant is shown two prizes and the difference in their prices. The contestant must decide whether that amount must be added to or subtracted from the price of the prize on the left to yield the price of the one on the right. A correct answer wins both prizes, plus a cash amount equal to their price difference.

==== Double Cross ====
An X-shaped touch screen board contains two rows of seven digits each, intersecting at the fourth digit. Each row corresponds to one of two prizes and contains a bar that highlights four consecutive digits. Whenever either bar is moved, the other one moves in the same way. The contestant wins both prizes by positioning the bars to highlight the correct prices, reading from upper left to lower right for one and lower left to upper right for the other.

==== Double Prices ====
The contestant is shown two possible prices for a prize, one of which is correct. The contestant wins the prize if they choose the correct price.

=== E ===
==== Easy as 1 2 3 ====
The contestant is given three blocks marked "1", "2" and "3", which are used to rank three prizes from least expensive to most expensive. The contestant wins everything by correctly ranking all three items.

=== F ===
==== Five Price Tags ====
The contestant is briefly shown five price tags, one of which is the correct price of a car. Four small prizes are then presented. For each prize, the contestant must guess whether its displayed price is "true" (correct) or "false" (incorrect). Each correct guess wins that prize and one choice from the five price tags. After playing through all four prizes, the tags are brought out again and the contestant wins the car by selecting the correct price before running out of choices.

==== Flip Flop ====
A gameboard displays four digits in the price of a prize arranged in pairs (e.g., 12|34) on two panels. At least one of the pairs of digits needs to be reversed. The contestant may "flip" the first pair ($2,134), "flop" the second pair ($1,243), or "flip flop" both pairs ($2,143). The contestant wins the prize by making the correct choice.

==== Freeze Frame ====
A ring of eight tiles, each with a two-digit number, rotates clockwise through a frame at the top of a gameboard. Two of the tiles appear in the frame at a time, forming a four-digit price. The contestant pulls a lever to stop the ring from moving when they believe the price within the frame is the price of the prize. If the contestant is correct, they win the prize.

=== G ===
==== Gas Money ====
The contestant is shown five prices for a car. One at a time, the contestant selects the four prices they believe to be incorrect. Each successful choice wins one of four different cash amounts hidden behind the prices ($1,000, $2,000, $3,000, or $4,000). After each guess, the contestant may choose to either stop and keep any cash won, or risk what has already been won by selecting another price. If the contestant successfully guesses all four incorrect prices, they win the car and $10,000. If the contestant guesses the correct price at any time, the game ends and the contestant loses everything.

==== Golden Road ====
Three prizes are presented. The first and second have three- and four-digit prices. The final prize is often billed as one of "the most expensive single prizes offered on the show", with a price consisting of five or occasionally six digits. The hundreds digit is missing from the price of each prize, and the digits in the prices of the first two prizes do not repeat.

The contestant is shown the price of a grocery item worth less than $1 and is then asked which of the two unique digits in its price belongs in the price of the first prize. If correct, the three digits in that price are used to select the missing digit for the second prize. If the contestant prices the second prize correctly, the four numbers in its price are used to select the missing digit for the final prize. If the contestant makes an incorrect choice at any time, the game ends but they win any correctly priced prizes.

==== Grand Game ====
The contestant is shown a target price and six grocery items, four of which are priced below the target price. One at a time, the contestant selects items they believe are priced lower than the target. The contestant's winnings start at $1 and are multiplied by ten for each correct selection, to $10, $100 and $1,000. A contestant who makes an incorrect guess prior to reaching the $1,000 level keeps whatever money is accumulated to that point. After reaching the $1,000 level, the contestant may choose to quit the game and keep their winnings or to risk that money in order to attempt to select the one remaining product priced lower than the target. A correct final choice wins the maximum of $10,000. However, if the final item the contestant selects is one of the two above the target price, they lose everything.

==== Gridlock! ====
The contestant is shown a row of seven model cars, the leftmost of which displays the first digit in the price of a car. The remaining six (three blue, followed by three red) each display a pair of digits. The contestant attempts to select the blue car that shows the correct second and third digits in the price. A correct choice allows them to choose from the red cars in order to find the last two digits. Successfully completing the price awards the car. Selecting one incorrect pair of digits allows the contestant to choose again from the remaining two cars in that group, but a second mistake at any time ends the game.

==== Grocery Game ====
The contestant is shown five grocery items and asked to purchase quantities of them to total between $20 and $22. The contestant can purchase any quantity of any item, but may not use any item more than once. After the contestant selects an item, its price is revealed and multiplied by the quantity, then added to the contestant's running total on a cash register. If the contestant succeeds, they win a prize. The game is lost if the contestant's total exceeds $22 or they exhaust all five items before reaching $20.

Prior to 1989, the original total range was $6.75 to $7. From 1989 through 2016, the winning range was $20 to $21. The first four times the game was played, the contestant received $100 at the start of the game, which they kept if they won, chose to stop before exceeding $7, or lost without exceeding $7. The contestant also received supplies of the five items in each of those four games. The quantities varied but always totaled at least $100 and counted toward the contestant's winnings.

=== H ===
==== 1/2 Off ====
A $10,000 cash prize is hidden in one of 16 boxes. The contestant is presented with three pairs of small prizes. Within each pair, one prize is correctly priced and the other has had its price cut in half. Each time the contestant selects a half-price prize, they win that pair of prizes and half of the remaining boxes are eliminated, leaving the winning box still in play. After all three pairs have been played, the contestant has one chance to select that box and win the $10,000. Guessing correctly on all three pairs awards a $1,000 bonus, which the contestant keeps regardless of the outcome.

After Drew Carey began hosting the show, the show began implementing his recommendation that a cash bonus be added for the pricing portion of the game. From Season 36 to 38, each correct guess added a $500 bonus in addition to the pair of prizes in that round, for a total of $1,500. Since Season 39 (September 28, 2010), the bonus can only be won by making three correct guesses, which is now $1,000. Under both formats, the contestant keeps the bonus money even if they do not win the grand prize.

==== Hi Lo ====
The contestant is shown six grocery items and must choose the three with the highest prices in order to win. These items' prices are placed in the "Hi" row of the gameboard, and the lowest price in that row is kept and the others discarded before the other three items' prices are revealed and placed in the "Lo" row. The contestant wins a large prize if all three of the remaining prices are lower than the remaining "Hi" price.

Early in the game's history, the contestant was asked whether each individual item's price belonged in the "Hi" row or the "Lo" row. The contestant either won the game by correctly placing each of the six prices or lost by making a mistake.

==== Hole in One (or Two) ====
The game is played for a car. The contestant must putt a golf ball into a hole (similar to miniature golf) in order to win a car. The putting green has six white lines painted across its width, and the contestant begins at the one farthest from the hole. They are asked to put six grocery items in ascending order of price. For every successive price that is higher than the one before it, the contestant moves one line closer to the hole. Correctly ordering all six items awards a $500 bonus, which the contestant keeps regardless of the outcome. If the contestant misses the putt, the host reveals the full name of the game as "Hole in One or Two" and they are given a second chance to make the putt from the same line.

Prior to the contestant's first attempt, the host usually takes an "inspiration putt" from the farthest line to demonstrate the use of the putter, although a model or golf-involved guest will occasionally perform this instead.

Until October 10, 1986, the contestant was allowed only one putt to win the car. The game's name became Hole in One or Two when the second-putt rule was instituted.

==== Hot Seat ====
Five small prizes are displayed onstage, arranged on a row of pedestals, and the contestant sits in a chair that moves automatically from one to the next. As the contestant reaches each prize, an incorrect price is revealed and the contestant must press one of two buttons to guess whether the true price is higher or lower. The contestant has 35 seconds to make all five guesses. If time runs out, any prizes the contestant has not reached are taken out of play.

The contestant is told that all of his/her correct guesses will be revealed first, and the chair moves to one of the five prizes. The contestant wins $500 for the first correct guess. Successive correct guesses increase the winnings to $2,500, $5,000, $10,000, and finally $20,000. After the chair has moved to the next item, the contestant may choose to stop before the price is revealed and keep all money won to that point, but if an incorrect guess is revealed, the game ends, and the contestant loses everything. However, the contestant keeps any small prizes won to that point.

=== I ===
==== It's in the Bag ====
The contestant is shown a series of five grocery bags, with a price tag on each one indicating the retail price of a grocery item in the bag. Six grocery items are then shown: five of the six items correspond to the items in the bags, while the sixth item does not match any of the displayed prices. One at a time, the contestant must match up the grocery items with their prices. After all five choices have been made, the host reveals the price of each item. If the item in the bag matches the one the contestant chose, the contestant wins the corresponding amount of money and must decide whether or not to continue to the next level or quit with the money they have already won. If the contestant chooses to continue and an incorrect item is revealed, the game ends and they lose everything. The first correct match wins $1,000, and each successive correct match doubles the contestant's winnings ($2,000, $4,000, $8,000 and $16,000).

=== L ===
==== Let 'em Roll ====
This game, loosely based on the dice game yacht, is played for a car or a cash prize of up to $7,500. It uses five large dice, each marked with an image of a car on three sides and cash values of $500, $1,000 and $1,500 on the other three. The contestant is given one roll of the dice and can earn up to two more using three grocery products. The price of the first item is given, and the contestant must determine whether the price of each of the next two items is higher or lower than the one preceding it.

In order to win the car, the contestant must roll a car on all five dice within their allotted number of rolls. Any dice that display cars are taken out of play after each roll. At any point, the contestant can elect to take the sum of the cash values rolled and quit. Contestants who use all of their rolls without winning the car automatically receive the total of the cash values on their final roll.

==== Line 'em Up ====
Line 'em Up is played for a car and three other prizes. The contestant is shown the first and last digits of the car's price. Two of the smaller prizes each have a three-digit price and one has a two-digit price. In order to win the car and the prizes, the contestant must line up the three prices in a frame to display a price for the car. The contestant wins everything if the guess is correct. Otherwise, the contestant is told how many of the digits are correctly placed—but not specifically which ones—and the contestant then makes a second guess. The contestant wins nothing if they guess incorrectly on the second attempt.

==== The Lion's Share ====
The contestant enters a wind chamber containing 40 numbered balls; five balls have the top prize of $100,000 each, five balls say "Lose It All," and the remaining balls have smaller cash amounts or other prize values. The contestant is given one free ball at the outset and shown a series of four small prizes. For each prize, a two-digit price is determined at random by the dropping of two balls with different digits, and the contestant must decide whether the price is "true" (correct) or "false" (with the digits reversed). Each correct guess wins that prize and one additional ball.

The wind chamber is then activated, and the contestant has 30 seconds to choose the appropriate number of balls and place them in a chute. The contestant chooses one of the numbers to reveal the prize behind it, which is added to their pot. They may stop at any time; revealing a "Lose It All" resets the pot to zero, but the contestant may continue if additional balls remain. The maximum potential total is $500,000, achieved by choosing all five $100,000 balls.

The game is named for the lion mascot of BetMGM, the presenting sponsor of the game.

==== Lucky Seven ====
The contestant is given seven $1 bills and shown the first digit in the price of a car. The contestant guesses the remaining digits in the price, one at a time, losing $1 for each digit of difference between their guess and the correct digit. If the contestant has at least $1 remaining after all digits are played, they win the car (using $1 to buy it), plus any additional money not used in the game.

Originally, all cars appearing in this game were priced under $10,000 and no free digits were revealed. When cars priced above $10,000 began to regularly appear, the free digit rule varied: on six special episodes which aired in prime time during the summer of 1986, the last digit in the price was revealed at the start of the game and the contestant had to guess the first four digits. Later that year on the daytime show, the contestant was offered the first digit and was required to guess the last four digits in the price.

=== M ===
==== Magic # ====
The contestant is shown two prizes and told which one is more expensive. The contestant pulls a lever to adjust a "magic number" on a display, and can win both prizes by setting it anywhere between the two prices or equal to either of them.

==== Make Your Move ====
The contestant is shown a sequence of nine digits on a gameboard which include, consecutively but in unknown order, the prices of three prizes: one of each with a two-, three- and four-digit price. Three sliding markers are set underneath the digits, one for each prize. In order to win everything, the contestant must correctly position the markers under the corresponding prices, using each digit once without overlapping.

For a brief time in October 1990, a second prize with a three-digit price replaced the prize with a two-digit price. Under these rules, one of the numbers on the board appeared in the price of two prizes, requiring the sliders to overlap.

==== Master Key ====
This game is played for a car and two additional prizes, each represented by a giant padlock. The contestant is shown two small prizes, each displaying a string of three digits, and must decide whether the first two or last two digits make up the correct price. For example, a prize showing "357" has a price of either $35 or $57. Each time the contestant chooses a correct price, they win that prize and select one key from a rack of five. Three of the keys correspond to one prize lock each, one will open none of the locks, and one (the "Master Key") opens all three. If the contestant earns any keys, they try them in the locks and win any prizes they are able to unlock.

==== Money Game ====
The contestant is shown a board of nine two-digit numbers, two of which are the first and last two digits in the price of a car. The middle digit is revealed at the outset, and the contestant chooses one number at a time. The correct numbers hide the front and rear halves of the car, while all others hide dollar signs. Any incorrect numbers chosen by the contestant are placed into a column of four blank spaces and awarded as cash worth the face value. The contestant wins both the car and the sum of the incorrect guesses if the contestant completes the price before filling the column. The contestant wins only the cash total if the column is filled first.

When the game was first played for cars with a five-digit price, the game was titled Big Money Game. For cars with four-digit prices, no digit in the price was revealed at the start of the game. Also, on the Tom Kennedy-hosted syndicated version in 1985, the contestant was shown the last digit in a five-digit price, meaning the contestant had to find the third and fourth digits in addition to the first two.

==== More or Less ====
The game is played for a car and three additional prizes. The contestant is shown an incorrect price for the first prize and is asked to guess whether its actual price is more or less than the one displayed. If the contestant is correct, they win that prize and move on to the next one, with the car as the last prize. A mistake at any point ends the game, but the contestant keeps any prizes correctly priced up to that point.

==== Most Expensive ====
The contestant is shown three prizes and must choose which is the most expensive in order to win everything.

=== N ===
==== Now....or Then ====
The contestant is shown six grocery items, each marked with a price and arranged on a circular gameboard. The contestant chooses one item at a time and must decide whether its price is correct as of the taping date ("now"), or whether it corresponds to a specific past year and month displayed on the board ("then"). In order to win the game and a large prize, the contestant must guess correctly on any three adjacent items. The contestant loses if incorrect guesses make it impossible to claim three adjacent items.

Prior to December 2, 1986, the original name of the game was Now....and Then. The name was changed to reflect the decision made by the contestants.

=== O ===
==== One Away ====
The contestant is shown an incorrect price for a car. Each digit displayed is either one higher or one lower than the correct digit in the price (e.g., an initial 7 is either a 6 or an 8). The contestant adjusts each digit and wins the car if they choose all five digits correctly. If all five digits are wrong, the contestant automatically loses. Otherwise, they are told the total number of correct digits and given an opportunity to make the necessary changes. The actual price of the car is then revealed and the contestant wins if their guess matches the price.

==== One Right Price ====
The contestant is shown two prizes and a price corresponding to one of them. The contestant wins both prizes by correctly choosing the prize associated with the price.

==== One Wrong Price ====
The contestant is shown three prizes, each with accompanying prices. Two prices are correct and one is incorrect. The contestant wins everything by choosing the prize with the incorrect price.

=== P ===
==== Pass the Buck ====
The game is played for a car and/or a cash prize. The contestant is shown a board with six numbered spaces. Behind the numbers are one space marked with an image of a car, two spaces marked "Lose Everything," and three spaces marked with cash values: $1,000, $3,000 and $5,000. The contestant is given one choice of a space at the start of the game and can earn two more.

The contestant is shown two pairs of grocery items. Within each pair, one item is correctly priced, while the other has had its price reduced by $1. Each time the contestant correctly chooses a reduced-price item, they win another choice from the board. The contestant then chooses one number at a time and can quit after any turn, keeping everything they have won to that point. Otherwise, the game ends when all choices have been used. Finding a "Lose Everything" space forfeits the accumulated winnings, but a contestant with choices remaining may continue to play.

Early in the game's history, the board had eight spaces instead of six, a third "Lose Everything" space and a $2,000 cash award, and the maximum cash amount that could have been won without winning the car was $10,000. Additionally, the contestant was not given a free choice at the start of the game. Instead, a third pair of grocery items (for a total of six items) was used to earn a third choice. During this period, the game ended immediately if the contestant failed to win a choice.

==== Pathfinder ====
The game is played for a car. The gameboard features a five-by-five floor grid of 25 digits, on which the contestant must walk a five-step path to spell out the price of the car in order to win it. The contestant begins in the center square, which contains the first digit, and every correct square is horizontally or vertically adjacent to the one before it. Diagonal steps, backtracking, and stepping onto already-used squares are not allowed. If the contestant steps onto an incorrect digit at any time, they must back up to the last correct digit and earn a second chance by pricing one of three smaller prizes. The contestant chooses a prize and must choose the correct price from two options. If the contestant succeeds, they win that prize and another chance to choose the next correct digit in the car's price. If the contestant fails to choose the correct price, they may try to win another second chance with a different prize. If the contestant steps on an incorrect digit with no small prizes remaining or guesses the incorrect price for the third small prize, the game ends.

The game originally offered cars with four-digit prices and an asterisk was on the center square. Contestants had to step onto all four digits without being given a free digit.

==== Pick-a-Number ====
The contestant is shown a prize and its price with one digit missing. The contestant wins the prize by correctly selecting the missing digit from three possible choices.

==== Pick-a-Pair ====
The contestant is shown six grocery items that form three pairs of equal price. The contestant selects two items, trying to pick one such pair; the price of the first item selected is revealed before the contestant selects the second. If the first attempt is unsuccessful, the contestant is given a second chance by discarding one of the two chosen items and matching the remaining one.

==== Plinko ====
Plinko is played for a potential grand prize of $50,000. The contestant is given one free Plinko chip and can win up to four more by pricing four small prizes, all of which are under $100 each. For each prize, the contestant is shown a price and must choose which digit of two displayed—the first or the second—is correct. The contestant wins the small prize and an extra chip for choosing the correct digit. After pricing all of the items, the contestant places one chip at a time atop a giant pegboard (styled similarly to a bean machine) and drops it, where it eventually falls into one of nine spaces at the bottom. The values of these spaces are arranged symmetrically. From the outside in, the sequence is $100–$500–$1,000–$0, with the middle space worth $10,000. The contestant wins the corresponding amount of money once the chip falls into a space, and the chip is removed from the board. If a chip becomes stuck on the board where the contestant cannot reach it to set it in motion again, it is knocked loose, and returned to the contestant to drop once again, with any and all stuck drops not being counted against contestants. The process is repeated until the contestant uses all of their Plinko chips.

Plinko premiered on January 3, 1983, and up until 1998, the center space on the Plinko board was worth $5,000, for a potential grand prize of $25,000.

==== Pocket Change ====
The game is played for a car. The contestant begins the game with $0.25, which is given as the car's initial selling price. Six digits are shown, five of which belong to the price of the car. The first digit in the price is revealed, and the contestant attempts to guess the remaining four digits, one at a time. Each incorrect choice raises the car's selling price by $0.25. When a digit is correctly chosen, it is removed from play and the contestant selects one of 20 envelopes from a gameboard without opening it. Each envelope contains a value between $0.00 and $2.00.

After the contestant correctly guesses the fifth digit and selects a final envelope, the envelopes (four in all) are opened and the values inside are added to the initial bank of $0.25. The contestant wins if the bank total meets or exceeds the car's selling price, or if the contestant fills in the entire price without an incorrect guess.

The first time the game was played, the contestant was not given the first digit and was required to guess all five digits in the price, resulting in five envelopes to be added to the initial $0.25.

==== Punch-a-Bunch ====
The game is played for a top prize of $25,000. The contestant answers higher-or-lower pricing questions about four items, one at a time. Each correct answer earns a punch on a 5-by-10 punchboard. The contestant punches holes into the appropriate number of spaces on the board, each of which contains a slip of paper with an amount of money written on it. The host then reveals the amount written on each slip, one at a time, beginning with the first hole punched. One hole contains the $25,000 prize, while the others contain amounts ranging from $100 to $10,000. The contestant may either accept the amount on the slip and end the game, or discard it in favor of the next hole punched. The game continues until the contestant either quits, wins the top prize, or reaches the last of their slips, in which case they must keep the last amount.

Prior to September 29, 2011, four slips displayed both a cash amount and the message "Second Chance." Finding one allowed the contestant to punch another hole immediately, and the value inside was added to the one on the Second Chance slip. While this rule was in effect, a contestant could win more than the top prize amount by finding it on a Second Chance punch.

The top prize from September 27, 1978 to October 1, 2008 was $10,000, with $50 as the lowest amount on the board.

Although the same pricing method was used to earn punches, the first 11 playings of Punch-a-Bunch used a different cash distribution and punch format. Each of the letters in the word "PUNCHBOARD" concealed a different number, with two each of 1 through 4 and one each of 5 and 10. After punching one of the letters, the contestant punched a hole in the field of 50 holes on the board. Twenty of the holes contained slips marked "Dollars", another 20 contained slips marked "Hundred" and the remaining 10 contained slips marked "Thousand". The number punched was multiplied by the phrase on the slip to determine the contestant's award (e.g., punching a ten and the word "Thousand" earned the contestant $10,000).

==== Push Over ====
The contestant is shown a prize and a series of nine numbered blocks which includes the correct price. A blue window, four or five blocks wide, is positioned at the far right end of a shelf, beyond which is a bin. The contestant wins the prize by pushing the entire row of blocks until the correct price is shown in the window; any blocks that fall over the edge into the bin cannot be retrieved.

=== R ===
==== Race Game ====
The contestant is shown four prizes and given a set of tags with their prices. The contestant then has 45 seconds to match the prices with the correct prizes. To see how many they have got right, the contestant pulls a lever on a display which then lights up the number of correctly placed tags. If the contestant has fewer than four right, they may rearrange the prices and pull the lever as often as time allows. The contestant wins any prizes they have correctly priced once time runs out.

==== Range Game ====
A $6,000 range for the price of a prize is displayed as a vertical scale. A $1,500 range finder moves up the scale, starting from the bottom, and the contestant has one opportunity to stop it by pressing a button. The contestant wins the prize if the range finder is covering the correct price when stopped.

Prior to 2026, the range was $600 and the range finder was $150.

==== Rat Race ====
The game is played for a car and two prizes. The contestant must price three items within specified ranges: a grocery item priced under $10 within $1; a small prize priced under $100 within $10; and a medium prize priced under $500 within $100. For each bid given within the correct range, the contestant chooses one of five colored mechanical rats (yellow, green, pink, orange and blue), which are positioned on a large dollar sign-shaped racetrack. The rats are then set in motion on the track; the contestant wins a car, a large prize, or a medium-valued prize if a chosen rat finishes first, second, or third respectively. More than one prize can be won, depending upon the number of rats chosen and how they finish the race.

=== S ===
==== Safe Crackers ====
The contestant attempts to win two prizes by guessing the three-digit combination of a giant safe that contains both prizes. The combination is the same as the price of the less expensive prize. The contestant is given the three unique digits and must use each of them only once to determine the correct price in order to open the safe and win both prizes.

==== Secret "X" ====
This game is played on a giant tic-tac-toe board with a secret X hidden in the center column. At the start of the game, the contestant is given one free X to place anywhere in either the left or right column of the board. Two small prizes are then shown, each with two possible prices. Each time the contestant correctly prices a prize, they win it and receive another X. After placing the additional X's, the secret X is revealed. The contestant wins the game and a large prize if they have formed a line of three either horizontally or diagonally; contestants cannot win with a vertical line.

==== Shell Game ====
Played similarly to the carnival game of the same name, the game features four shells, one of which conceals a ball. The contestant is asked whether each of four prizes is actually priced higher or lower than a given incorrect price. The contestant wins that small prize and a chip to place beside one of the shells for each correct guess. If the contestant places a chip beside the shell containing the ball, they win a bonus prize. A contestant who correctly prices all four items automatically wins the prize, and can also win a cash amount equal to the prize value by correctly guessing which shell conceals the ball. Previously, this bonus was $500 on the daytime show, and $1,000 on the 1970s syndicated version. On the 1985–86 syndicated version, the bonus was originally $500, then $1,000; eventually, it was awarded for correctly pricing all four items, without having to select the right shell.

==== Side by Side ====
This game is played for prize with a four-digit price. The contestant is shown a pair of two-digit numbers and must decide which order to place them and form the correct price (e.g. "75" and "42" can give options of $7,542 and $4,275). The contestant wins the prize if the correct choice is made.

==== Spelling Bee ====
The game is played for a car or a cash prize of up to $5,000. A gameboard contains 30 cards: eleven Cs, eleven As, six Rs, and two "CAR"s. In order to win the car, the contestant must choose either one of each letter or a CAR card. The contestant chooses two free cards from the board and may win up to three more by pricing each of three small prizes within $10 of their actual prices, high or low. The contestant automatically wins all three prizes and cards by guessing any price exactly, even if the contestant had missed any previous guesses. After the cards are chosen, the contestant is offered $1,000 per card to quit the game and walk away. The cards are revealed one at a time. If the car is not yet won, the cash buyout offer is repeated with the remaining cards. The contestant wins nothing if they fail to spell CAR or get one of the two CAR cards after the last card is revealed. If the contestant does win the car, however, they do not receive cash for any remaining cards.

Prior to 2007, each card was worth $500, for a maximum buyout of $2,500.

==== Squeeze Play ====
The contestant is shown a prize and a price that has had one incorrect digit inserted. The first and last digits are always correct. To win the prize, the contestant must remove the extra middle digit to leave behind the correct price. This game has been played for prizes with four- and five-digit prices, giving the contestant a choice between three and four middle digits, respectively.

==== Stack the Deck ====
The game is played for a car. The contestant is shown seven playing cards containing digits, five of which make up the price of the car. Three pairs of grocery items are displayed, and the contestant must guess which item in each pair corresponds to a given price. Each correct guess allows him/her to fill in one correct digit in the price of the car. After all three pairs have been played, the contestant has one chance to win the car by correctly filling in all remaining digits.

==== Swap Meet ====
The contestant is shown a base prize and three more prizes. In order to win all four, they must choose the one prize in the group of three that has the same price as the base prize.

==== Switch? ====
The contestant is shown two prizes, each with a price. The contestant must decide whether the prices are correct as shown or need to be switched with each other. A correct decision wins both prizes.

==== Switcheroo ====
This game is played for a car and four additional prizes priced under $100. The contestant is shown the prices for the five prizes, each of which is missing its tens digit, and given five blocks with the missing digits. The contestant has 30 seconds to complete the prices using these blocks. After either the time limit expires or the contestant is satisfied, the number of correct prices is revealed, but not specifically which are correct. The contestant wins everything if every price is correct; otherwise, they may either take another 30 seconds to change the prices or leave them alone. The extra time is given by default if every price in the first attempt is incorrect. The contestant wins any prizes that are correctly priced once the game ends.

=== T ===
==== Take Two ====
The contestant is shown four prizes and a target amount. The contestant has two chances to win everything by choosing the two prizes whose prices match the target when added together.

==== Temptation ====
The contestant is shown the first digit in the price of a car and is then presented with four additional prizes, each of which has only two distinct digits in its price. As each prize is presented, the contestant selects one digit from its price to fill in the price of the car. After the last prize is shown, they are given a chance to change any digits and must then make another choice: take the four prizes and quit the game, or risk them and try for the car. If the contestant tries for the car and has the correct price, they win everything. If any digits are incorrect, they lose everything.

Originally, when the game was played for cars with four-digit prices, the first digit was not given. Also, early playings of the game included prizes with three different digits in their prices as well as prizes with two-digit prices. In addition, when the game debuted, contestants were not given the option to change any digits after making their initial selections.

==== 10 Chances ====
The contestant is given ten chances to correctly price three prizes. The first has a two-digit price, the second a three-digit price, and the third is a car. The contestant is given three unique digits for the first prize and must guess the price using two of them. The process repeats for the second prize, with four digits given to the contestant, three of which are used. For the car, the contestant is given five digits and must use all of them to guess its price. No digit may be repeated in any guess. The game ostensibly includes a ten-second time limit for writing down each choice, though this is rarely enforced. The contestant wins any prizes that they have correctly priced after all ten chances are used.

Originally, the game used cars with four digits in the price and the contestant had to use four of the five available digits in each guess.

==== That's Too Much ====
The contestant is shown up to ten prices for a car in ascending order, one at a time. The contestant wins the car by correctly identifying the first revealed price which is higher than the actual price by calling out "That's Too Much!"

==== 3 Strikes ====
The contestant is shown eight baseballs: five white ones marked with digits in the price of a car, and three red ones marked with an X to represent strikes. The balls are placed into a hopper and mixed, and the contestant blindly draws one ball at a time. If a digit is drawn, the contestant must guess where it belongs in the price. If correct, the digit appears in that position on the gameboard and the ball is removed from play. If incorrect, the ball is returned to the hopper without penalty. If a strike is drawn, an X is lit up in the strike display on the gameboard and the ball is removed from play. To win the car, the contestant must fill in every digit before drawing all three strikes.

When the game debuted in 1976, the digits and strikes were marked on chips that were dropped into a bag and mixed. As car prices exceeded $10,000 in the mid-1980s, the game was briefly known as 3 Strikes + when cars priced above $10,000 were first offered. Since 1993, the game has been played for vehicles priced at least $30,000, typically luxury vehicles, premium trucks, or electric cars. From 2013-18, in instances where cars priced above $100,000 are offered, all six digits are placed into the bag along with the strikes.

From 1998 to 2008, only one strike chip was used, and it was returned to the bag after being drawn. The contestant lost by drawing the strike chip three times. During a brief period during Season 37 (2008), the first digit in the price was lit at the beginning of the game, with chips representing the remaining four digits plus the three strike chips placed in the bag.

==== Time Is Money ====
The contestant is shown five grocery items that must be placed on tables with specific price ranges: $0 to $2.99, $3 to $5.99, and $6 and higher. The contestant is given ten seconds and one chance to place all five items in their proper categories. Doing so correctly awards $20,000. If the contestant fails to place them correctly, they are given 40 seconds to make changes, with the potential prize decreasing steadily at a rate of $500 per second. The contestant may rearrange items as often as time permits, and must press a button after each attempt to learn the result. If they place the items correctly, the clock stops and they win any remaining money. The contestant is never told how many items or which ones are correctly placed. The revamped game premiered on September 22, 2014.

Under the original rules the game was played for a large prize and $500 instead of $20,000 cash. The contestant had 15 seconds to correctly group all of the items. If the contestant was correct, they also won $500 in addition to the prize. If unsuccessful, the contestant could stop playing and keep the $500, or exchange it for another 15 seconds to regroup the items, without knowing how many items were incorrectly placed or which ones. After two playings, the rules were changed to remove the $500 bonus and offer the contestant two chances to correctly place the items, with a 20-second time limit for each chance. If any were placed incorrectly after the first chance, the contestant was told how many items were incorrectly placed (although not specifically which individual products were placed correctly). If the contestant was incorrect on the second chance, the game ended and they won nothing.

==== To the Penny ====
The contestant is shown five grocery items and must guess their prices. The first item has two possible choices for its price, and each successive item has one more choice than the one preceding it, up to six for the final item. A correct guess on the first item awards the contestant $1,500, and subsequent correct guesses increase the contestant's winnings to $3,000, $6,000, $12,000, and finally $25,000.

The contestant is given five oversized pennies at the start of the game and can use one to eliminate one incorrect price for the current item, and/or two to continue the game after an incorrect guess. The contestant may use multiple pennies on the same item. At any time, the contestant may choose to end the game and keep all winnings. If the contestant makes an incorrect guess with fewer than two pennies remaining, the game ends and they lose everything.

==== 2 for the Price of 1 ====
The game is played for two prizes, one of which has three digits in its price. The contestant must select which of two digits displayed is the correct digit in each position of the price. The contestant is offered a free digit of their choice and then selects which of the remaining digits are correct. If the contestant correctly determines the price, they win both prizes.

=== V ===
==== Vend-O-Price ====
Three grocery items are displayed on separate shelves of a gameboard resembling a vending machine, from top to bottom in increasing order of price. The contestant inserts a coin into the machine, and the shelves' sliding doors open to reveal a different quantity of each item. In order to win, the contestant must choose the shelf with the highest total price, based on the price for one unit multiplied by the number of items on its shelf.

== Retired games ==
When the 1972 version of the show premiered, many games did not have official names which were used on the air. Some of the names below are unofficial or assigned by the production staff.

=== A ===
==== Add 'Em Up ====
The contestant was shown a car with a price which contained four unique digits and was told the sum. The contestant chose one digit to be revealed and had to guess the other three, one at a time and in any order. The total of all correctly guessed digits was shown on a gameboard. In order to win the car, the contestant had to guess all of the missing digits before making two mistakes.

=== B ===
==== Balance Game ====
Five small prizes were presented and the contestant was given five "Barker silver dollar" coins. The contestant attempted to balance a scale with a combination of prizes added to each side. The contestant chose one prize at a time and assigned it to either the left or right side of the scale. Coins representing the value of the prize were placed on the side selected. If the totals of the prizes on both sides matched at any time, the contestant won a larger prize package. If the totals agreed to within $5, they could use the provided coins to balance the scale and win. Regardless of the outcome, the contestant kept any prizes they chose during the game as well as any unused coins.

==== Bullseye ====
The contestant was given seven chances to guess the actual price of a car. In response to each guess, the host told the contestant whether the actual price was higher or lower. In some appearances of the game, the contestant was given a $500 range into which the price fell.

==== Bump ====
The contestant was shown two prizes and a British-themed gameboard containing four double-decker buses, each marked with a price. The far left and far right buses displayed the same price, and the prizes' names were placed below the two middle buses. A model stood at each end of the row, and the contestant chose one of them to bump the buses, resulting in either the leftmost or rightmost two coming to rest above the prize names and the others being removed/knocked from the board. The contestant won both prizes if the buses' prices matched those of the prizes below them.

==== Buy or Sell ====
Three prizes were shown, each with an incorrect price. The contestant bought prizes they believed were under-priced and sold prizes they believed were overpriced. The actual prices were then revealed, one at a time. For each correct decision, the difference between the two prices was added to a bank. For each incorrect decision, the difference was subtracted from the bank. If the contestant ended the game with a positive bank balance, they won that amount of money and all three prizes. The most money that could be accumulated was $1,900. Prior to 1997, winning contestants did not receive the accumulated money.

=== C ===
==== Clearance Sale ====
Three prizes were shown and the contestant was given three price tags, each of which bore a sale price lower than one of the items' actual retail price. The contestant placed a price tag on each prize and won everything if each sale price was below the actual price of its respective prize.

==== Credit Card ====
Five prizes were shown. The contestant was then presented with a large credit card, which they inserted into an ATM to reveal its credit limit. The contestant then chose three prizes, one at a time, and their prices were deducted from the credit limit. The contestant won all five prizes by not exceeding the limit with the three choices.

=== D ===
==== Double Bullseye ====
The original Bullseye game was reworked into a two-player format after never producing a winner. In doing so, the game became the only pricing game which guaranteed a winner and use more than one player at a time. After the first contestant won their way on stage, another contestant was called from the audience, and another item went up for bids. After the second contestant won their way on stage, the car was shown. Barker asked each one to give him a bid on the price of the car after giving a price range of $500. He then told the opponent whether the price was higher or lower than the bid, and the two alternated until one gave the exact price, winning the car.

Australia's version of The Price is Right used this format for their Showcase round. Hosts Ian Turpie or Larry Emdur gave a price range and asked the two contestants to bid in the same manner. Whoever gave the exact price won the opportunity to play for the showcase.

==== Double Digits ====
A car was shown along with four small prizes. For each small prize, the contestant was shown the second digit in that prize's price, and then two possibilities for the first digit. The contestant attempted to select the correct first digit in the price, which also corresponded to a digit in the car's price. If the four correct digits had been chosen, the contestant won everything. If the contestant failed to win the car, they still won any small prizes which were priced correctly.

=== F ===
==== Finish Line ====
Six small prizes were described in three pairs. For each pair, the contestant tried to pick the more expensive item. The sum of the prices of the rejected prizes made up a finish line that a miniature horse and jockey would have to cross. After all three choices were made, the horse moved one step for each dollar in the total value of the prizes the contestant had selected. If the horse passed the finish line, the contestant won a larger prize. Regardless of the outcome, the contestant kept the three chosen prizes.

==== Fortune Hunter ====
Four prizes were displayed, each with a gift box next to it; one box contained a $5,000 cash prize. Barker read three clues based on the prices of the prizes to help the contestant eliminate the associated item, after which the box for the one remaining prize was opened. The contestant won all four prizes and the $5,000 if that box contained the cash, or nothing if it was empty.

The contestant did not have to eliminate the prizes in the order the clues were read. The prizes could be eliminated in any order, as long as only the box that contained the money was left.

=== G ===
==== Gallery Game ====
A painting of a prize was shown to the contestant. Below the painting was a price, in which one digit was only partly shown (e.g., the bottom of a "0" or the middle part of a "3"). The contestant won by correctly painting in the remainder of that digit.

==== Give or Keep ====
Three pairs of small prizes were presented, and the contestant chose one prize from each pair to keep and one to give back. If the total value of the kept prizes equaled or exceeded the total value of the ones given back, the contestant won a larger prize. Regardless of the outcome, the contestant won the three kept prizes.

=== H ===
==== Hit Me ====
The contestant played blackjack against the house, trying to get as close to 21 as possible without going over (busting). Before the game began, the contestant cut a deck of oversized playing cards and two were dealt out as the house's starting hand, the first one face down as a hole card. The contestant was then shown six grocery items, each of which displayed a price that was equal to its actual price multiplied by a whole number from 1 to 10. Each item had a card hidden underneath it with a value equal to that item's multiplier. One of the six items displayed its actual price and would give an ace if chosen, while another showed a price multiplied by 10. Aces could count as 1 or 11.

The contestant chose items and received their cards until they either reached a total of 21, busted, or chose to stop. Reaching 21 with any combination of cards was an automatic win, regardless of the house's hand. If the contestant stopped, the house's hole card was revealed and, if necessary, additional cards were dealt from the deck until its total reached 17 or higher. The contestant won if their total matched or exceeded the house's total without busting, or if the house busted. If the contestant busted, they immediately lost the game.

Situations involving an ace in the house's hand (whether it should be counted as one or eleven even when the result would be in favor of the house) were handled inconsistently over the course of the game's time on the show.

==== Hurdles ====
A grocery item was described, and its price was attached to a runner figure on a gameboard. The contestant was shown three pairs of items and asked to choose the one in each pair that was lower in price than the base item. Each choice was marked with a blue flag. Once the contestant had made all three choices, a starter's pistol was fired and the runner began to move across the board, with a hurdle rising from each chosen item as he approached it. If the contestant chose correctly, the hurdle would stop rising in time for the runner to clear it. If the runner cleared all three hurdles, the contestant won the game and a large prize. However, if the contestant chose incorrectly at any point, the runner would crash into that item's hurdle and the game ended.

=== I ===
==== It's Optional ====
Two cars of the same make and model were shown, and the contestant was told the price difference between them. A list of available options was then displayed; the contestant chose one at a time, whose price was revealed and added to the price of the first car. In order to win the cars, the contestant had to bring the first car to within $100 of the second one without going over. The maximum number of options that the contestant could choose varied from one playing to the next, but was generally between three and five.

=== J ===
==== Joker ====
The contestant was shown a hand of five face-down cards, one of which was a joker. Four small prizes were presented, each with a displayed price. For each one, the contestant had to decide whether or not to reverse the digits in order to obtain the correct price (e.g. $37 or $73). Each correct choice awarded that prize and allowed the contestant to discard one card from the hand. The contestant won the game if the joker was found among the discards.

=== M ===
==== Make Your Mark ====
Three prizes were shown along with four prices on a gameboard. The contestant was given $500 and chose the three prices they believed were correct, using a marker to note each selection. Two correct prices were revealed among the three marked ones and matched to their prizes, and the contestant then decided to leave the last marker alone, or return the $500 and switch the marker to the one un-chosen price. If the contestant chose correctly, the contestant won all three prizes and kept the $500 if the contestant had not returned it. If the third choice was incorrect, the contestant won nothing.

The game was originally titled Barker's Markers in reference to former host Bob Barker, but was re-titled Make Your Mark after Drew Carey took over as host and during the game's single appearance on the 1994 syndicated version hosted by Doug Davidson.

==== Mystery Price ====
A prize package was presented to the contestant and the price of the least expensive item in the package was dubbed the "mystery price". Four smaller prizes were shown individually and the contestant placed a bid on each of them. If their bid was equal to or lower than the item's actual price, the contestant won that prize and the amount of their bid was placed into a bank. If the contestant overbid on the prize, it was lost and no value was added to the bank.

After all four small prizes were played, the mystery price was revealed. The contestant won the larger prize package in addition to any small prizes the contestant did not overbid on if the bank was equal to or greater than the mystery price.

=== O ===
==== On the Nose ====
In order to win a car, the contestant competed in one of five possible sporting events. The events varied each time the game was played and included throwing a baseball or football into a specified area, shooting a basketball into a hoop, hitting a tennis ball with a racket into a specified area or popping a balloon with a dart.

After being shown the car, the contestant was presented with four possible prices and selected the one they believed was the actual price of the car. The contestant won a $1,000 bonus if correct and four attempts at the sporting event preselected for that day. The contestant received fewer attempts at the sporting event the further away the selected price was from the actual price. If the contestant succeeded in the sporting event, they won the car.

==== On the Spot ====
Six small prizes were described and the contestant was shown three paths, colored blue, yellow and pink, extending outward from a center black spot. Each path was marked with three prices. To win a car, the contestant attempted to match the three prices in any path to the six prizes in play. After choosing a path, the contestant had to correctly determine which prize was associated with each price along the path in turn. The contestant returned to the center spot after making a mistake and chose a new path. Some paths repeated prices, and if a contestant had already correctly matched a price with its prize, they could bypass it and go to the next price. Making mistakes on all three paths ended the game, though the contestant won any correctly priced prizes.

=== P ===
==== Pay the Rent ====
This game was played using six grocery items and offered a top prize of $100,000. The main prop was a house with two stories, an attic, and a mailbox. The first and second stories each had space to hold two items, while the attic and mailbox could each hold only one. The contestant was asked to arrange the grocery items in the house so that the total price of the item(s) on any level was higher than the total for the previous one, starting at the mailbox and working upward toward the attic.

After placing all six items, starting from the mailbox and working upward, the contestant immediately received $1,000 for the item in the mailbox. The item prices were revealed, one level at a time. The contestant's winnings increased each time the total for a level was higher than the previous one: $5,000 for the first story, $10,000 for the second story, and $100,000 for the attic. The contestant could choose to stop the game at any time and keep all money won to that point. However, if a level total was lower than the previous one, the game ended and the contestant lost everything.

==== Penny Ante ====
Two grocery items were shown, each with four possible prices. The contestant was given three oversized pennies and attempted to choose the correct price for each item, one at a time. Each wrong guess cost them a penny. In order to win a large prize, the contestant had to find both correct prices without losing all three pennies.

The first five times the game was played, the board was not divided into halves for each grocery item. Instead, the two correct prices were hidden among all eight choices. Whenever an incorrect price was guessed, one penny fell from the side of the gameboard into a bucket for each cent in the amount of the guess. A scoreboard was attached to the front of the gameboard, which kept track of the pennies accumulated. The contestant lost the game if the total of the incorrect guesses made before finding the two correct prices equaled 100 pennies or more.

==== The Phone Home Game ====
The contestant and a preselected home viewer participating via telephone teamed to attempt to win up to $15,000. Before the game began, the home viewer was given a list of the actual prices for each of seven grocery items. The items were then described to the contestant and the home viewer gave a price for one of them. The contestant selected the item they believed matched that price. If the contestant was correct, the team shared a hidden cash award associated with that specific item. If the contestant was incorrect, both the guessed item and the correct one were removed from play and their cash awards were lost. The contestant and home viewer played three turns in this manner; if the home viewer read the name of an item instead of its price, it was removed from play and that turn was lost.

The contestant and home viewer split the total of the cash awards for all correctly guessed items. The awards included one each of $10,000, $3,000, and $2,000, and two each of $1,000 and $200.

==== Poker Game ====
Four prizes were shown, all with three-digit prices. The contestant selected two of the prizes and the digits in their prices were used to form the best possible five-card poker hand, with nines high and zeroes low. After the hand was revealed, the contestant chose either to keep it or pass it to the house. The prices of the other two prizes were then revealed and assembled into a second poker hand. If the contestant had a better hand than the house, they won everything.

The hand rankings were similar to those of poker and were, from highest to lowest: five of a kind, four of a kind, full house, three of a kind, two pair, one pair, and high card. However, straights did not count, and without suits, flushes were not possible.

In early playings, the contestant was responsible for declaring their own poker hand, using any five of the six digits from the two chosen prizes, and could not pass it to the house.

==== Professor Price ====
The last two digits in the price of a car were revealed, and the contestant was asked a series of general knowledge questions with single-digit numerical answers. (Example: "How many ounces are there in half a pound?" – answer: 8.) After each question, the contestant had to guess whether that digit was one of the first two in the price. If it was, it was revealed whether the contestant guessed correctly or not. The contestant won the car by giving three correct answers/guesses, or lost by missing three.

A large animatronic puppet known as Professor Price was central to the game. The contestant's progress was tracked by the puppet's hands, with correct answers/guesses counted by upward-pointing fingers on the right hand and incorrect ones counted by downward-pointing fingers on the left. As with Clock Game, the audience was required to remain silent while the game was in progress.

The game was played only twice, making it the shortest-lived game in the show's history. It was also the only game to have a perfect record, having been won both times it was played.

=== S ===
==== Shopping Spree ====
The contestant was shown four prizes and a dollar amount. To win all four prizes, they had to choose three prizes, one at a time, such that the total of their prices exceeds that dollar amount.

==== Shower Game ====
The contestant was shown six shower stalls, each marked with a possible price for a car. Three stalls contained confetti, two contained $100 in one-dollar bills, and the one with the actual price contained a giant car key. The contestant entered a stall and pulled its chain, triggering the release of its contents. Finding confetti allowed them to choose again. As soon as the contestant found either the $100 or the car, the game ended and they won that prize.

==== Split Decision ====
A car and a medium prize were shown and a string of eight digits was displayed on a gameboard. The numbers in the prices of the prizes appeared in order but were not necessarily placed side by side. The contestant was given 20 seconds to pull down the three digits that made up the price of the smaller prize, leaving the five digits that made up the price of the car. To stop the clock, the contestant pushed a button on the gameboard. If the correct three-digit price for the smaller prize had been pulled down, the contestant won both prizes. If incorrect, the contestant continued guessing until a correct guess was made or time ran out.

A later variation in the rules did not feature a clock. Instead, the contestant was given only three chances to win.

==== Step Up ====
The contestant had a chance to win up to four prizes and $3,000. The contestant selected one prize and the price was immediately revealed. The contestant then attempted to choose a more expensive prize. A correct choice awarded both prizes and $500, after which the contestant could either stop the game or try to choose a more expensive prize. If this choice was correct, the contestant also won that prize and an additional $1,000 and had the same choice to stop or continue. If the contestant continued, and the last prize was the most expensive of all, the contestant won it as well and an additional $1,500. However, an incorrect guess at any time ended the game and the contestant lost everything.

==== Super Ball!! ====
The contestant had a chance to win up to three large prizes by rolling balls up a skee ball ramp. The ball for each large prize was presented alongside a small prize displaying two possible prices. The contestant won the small prize and earned the corresponding ball by selecting the correct price. The ramp contained three rings: $50 and $100, which awarded those cash amounts, and WIN, which awarded the large prize for that ball. The contestant was given a practice ball to roll before attempting to win any of the large prizes.

A fourth small prize was then revealed. If the contestant priced it correctly, the contestant won it and earned a "Super Ball." Rolling the Super Ball into the WIN ring awarded all three large prizes (or a $3,000 bonus if the contestant had already won them all), while rolling it into either cash ring awarded triple the marked value.

==== Super Saver ====
Six grocery items were presented, five marked below their actual retail price and one marked above. The contestant chose four items, one at a time. The difference between the marked price and the actual price was added to a bank, or subtracted if the overpriced item was chosen. The contestant won the game by saving a total of at least $1 after the four choices. Even if the overpriced item was chosen, it was always mathematically possible to win the game by selecting the three products with the largest differences below the actual prices. Also, the contestant was required to choose four items even if the bank total exceeded $1 after making two or three selections.

=== T ===
==== Telephone Game ====
A car and two smaller prizes were shown, along with four grocery items. The contestant was given $1 to purchase two of the four grocery items, attempting to spend no more than 90¢ so that they would have a dime left in order to use a pay telephone. If the contestant succeeded, they dialed one of three given four-digit telephone numbers and won the prize whose price was associated with that number, indicated by a model answering the telephone placed next to it. The number for the car represented its price in dollars, while the numbers for the two small prizes represented their prices in dollars and cents. The contestant won nothing if their grocery item purchase exceeded 90¢.

==== Trader Bob ====
The contestant was presented with one small prize and was then shown three pairs of additional prizes, one at time. The contestant attempted to choose the higher-priced prize in each pair, attempting to "trade up" from that initial prize and create a sequence of four prizes in ascending order of price. If the contestant successfully traded up with all three choices, they won both the last small prize chosen and a larger prize package. If not, the contestant won only the first small prize chosen that was lower in price than the one before it.

==== Triple Play ====
Triple Play was the only game to regularly offer three cars. The contestant was shown two price choices for the first car, three for the second and four for the third. For each car, the contestant had choose which of the displayed prices is closest to the actual price without going over. The contestant could not stop the game at any point and could only win everything by guessing correctly on each of them. An incorrect guess at any time ended the game with no winnings.

=== W ===
==== Walk of Fame ====
The contestant could win up to four prizes by guessing their prices within a set range, high or low. The prizes were presented in order of increasing value, and the winning range increased from one to the next. The contestant was given a choice of two autograph books signed by the show's cast if they missed on any of the first three prizes, one of which contained a page marked "Second Chance". If the contestant chose this book, play moved on to the next prize, but the missed prize could not be won. The game ended once the contestant made a second mistake, failed to choose the "Second Chance" book, or made a mistake on the fourth prize.

== Special rule changes ==
Rules to certain pricing games have occasionally been changed on special episodes. On a series of primetime episodes in 1986, cash bonuses were added to "Clock Game" and "Hole in One." Later primetime specials from 2002 to 2008 featured increased cash prizes for some games, including "Plinko," "1/2 Off," "Grand Game," "It's in the Bag," and "Punch-a-Bunch."

During episodes of The Price Is Right $1,000,000 Spectacular, contestants had an opportunity to win $1 million in the Showcase Showdown for spinning $1.00 in their bonus spin. If no contestant earned a bonus spin in either Showcase Showdown, the winner of the showcase spun the Big Wheel once and could win $1 million for landing on $1.00. Originally, if both contestants overbid in the showcase, a new one was called from the audience at the end of the show to spin for the bonus; the rule was later changed to give the spin to the contestant with the smaller overbid.

Later episodes of The Price Is Right $1,000,000 Spectacular in 2008 featured rule changes to some pricing games which awarded a $1 million bonus to the contestant for achieving specific goals. One game in each episode was designated as the "million dollar game" and required contestants to accomplish a specific outcome to win the bonus. Some games required correct pricing on a first attempt ("Cover Up" and "One Away"), while others gave contestants the option to risk their previous winnings for a chance at the bonus. "Plinko" awarded a golden chip to any contestant who hit the highest-value slot at least three times; if the golden chip also landed in that slot, the contestant won $1 million.

Other rule changes have been made for specially-themed episodes, including those airing during "Big Money Week," "Dream Car Week," and "Jackpot January" (the primetime episodes airing during the time between Survivor seasons). During these episodes, prizes of the appropriate type (cash or cars, respectively) are increased in value and/or added as bonuses for winning a pricing game or scoring $1.00 from a bonus spin in the Showcase Showdown.

In 2016 and 2020, The Price Is Right and Let's Make a Deal aired a "Mash-Up Week" in which one game from each show was featured on the other every day. The swapped games were played under modified rules in accordance with the theme of the shows on which they appeared.

In 2011, 2013, and 2017, the show held a "Celebrity Charity Week." A different celebrity appeared on each day's episode to provide assistance during the pricing games, and a donation equal to the total of the contestants' winnings from those games was made to the charity of his/her choice. The celebrity also spun the Big Wheel once during the second Showcase Showdown; the result (in cents) was converted to dollars, multiplied by 100, and added to the donation.
