= The New Price Is Right (1994 game show) =

American television series (1994–95)

- Created by: Bob Stewart
- Developed by: Jonathan Goodson
- Directed by: Andy Felsher
- Presented by: Doug Davidson
- Announcer: Burton Richardson
- Music by: Edd Kalehoff
- Country of origin: United States
- Original language: English
- No. of episodes: 80

Production
- Executive producers: Jay Wolpert; Andy Felsher
- Producers: Phillip W. Rossi; Kathy Greco
- Production location: Television City Studios
- Running time: 22 minutes
- Production companies: Mark Goodson Productions; Paramount Domestic Television

Original release
- Network: Syndicated
- Release: September 12, 1994 – January 27, 1995

Related
- The Price Is Right

The New Price Is Right is a syndicated edition of the American game show The Price Is Right which premiered on September 12, 1994, and ran until January 27, 1995. This was the third thirty-minute syndicated edition, following a weekly series that ran from 1972 until 1980 and a daily series that ran for one season between 1985 and 1986.

== Personnel ==
Doug Davidson, who was already well-known for his role as Paul Williams on the CBS soap opera The Young and the Restless, hosted this syndicated series. Burton Richardson, who had previously served as the announcer for The Arsenio Hall Show, was the announcer. Julie Lynn Cialini, Ferrari Farris, and Lisa Stahl were the three prize models.

Several then-current and former production personnel from the CBS network version of The Price Is Right also served roles on this version, former daytime series producer Jay Wolpert (who originally left the show in 1978) served as executive producer in this version alongside Andy Felsher (the son of long-time Family Feud producer Howard Felsher). Felsher also served as the director of the series while then-current daytime producer Phillip W. Rossi and Kathy Greco served as producers in this version. (Greco would go on to be a producer on the daytime series in 2008, a role she would hold until 2011.)

The New Price Is Right was a production of Mark Goodson Productions, and was distributed by Paramount Domestic Television. The program, like the daytime series, was taped at Television City in Los Angeles, California.

== Format ==
The New Price Is Right, unlike its syndicated predecessors, was not a carbon copy of the daytime series. Significant changes were made to the show format.

=== Contestants ===
One of the most significant format changes for The New Price Is Right was the elimination of the long-standing One Bid game, which determines who comes onstage to play a pricing game. Instead, when an audience member was called to "come on down", that contestant was immediately brought onstage to play a pricing game. A total of three pricing games were played in one program.

=== Aesthetic and other changes ===
In keeping with a more modern theme, the set featured a black stage floor, darker lighting, muted colors such as silver, purple and gold, and a giant wall of video screens.

Edd Kalehoff created an entirely new set of music cues for the series. The Price Is Right theme was re-recorded with a faster tempo and jazzier sound featuring a saxophone lead as opposed to synthesizers. While the show did not last long, some of Kalehoff’s cues were later used on the daytime series in the years that followed.

Like the previous syndicated editions, The New Price Is Right had a significantly larger prize budget. Expensive foreign cars were regularly featured. Games that used grocery items on the daytime version featured merchandise prizes on this version. Higher valued prizes were offered in cases of games that already used these types of prizes.

=== Pricing game rule changes ===
- Barker's Markers: The name was changed to "Make Your Mark" the single time it was played on this version of the show. This name was adopted on the daytime show in 2008 when Drew Carey became the host.
- Clock Game: Instead of using the prop from the daytime series, the game positioned the contestant in front of the video wall where the prices were displayed for the studio audience. A digital clock was used to keep time. The contestant was provided a $1,000 range in which to guess the price of each prize. The game frequently used prizes with four-digit prices. On some occasions a third prize was awarded as a bonus for winning (a rule change later adopted on the daytime version in 2009).
- Hole in One: Instead of revealing prices after the contestant placed all six items, the price for each item was revealed after it was chosen and only placed in line if it was more expensive than the one before.
- Plinko: While the top prize remained the same at $5,000 per chip for a potential total of $25,000, two configurations of slots were utilized, one of which featured two $2,500 slots in place of the $100 slots. In order to earn chips, a higher/lower guessing format was used due to the merchandise items’ values exceeding $100.
- Punch a Bunch: During some episodes, Davidson pulled the slip out of the hole as soon as it was punched. The contestant then decided to keep the money or punch another hole. On the daytime show, the slips are not revealed until the contestant has made all of his or her initial punches.
- Superball: Instead of waiting until guessing all three small prizes before rolling the balls, the contestant rolled after each correct guess.
- 3 Strikes: The first number was lit at the beginning of the game and the number could repeat elsewhere in the price. Four chips representing the remaining numbers in the price were then placed into the bag with three strike chips.

== Showcase Showdown ==
Another of the many changes made for The New Price Is Right was the introduction of the Showcase Showdown, which had not been part of the previous syndicated productions. With the change came, in addition to having only one contestant play for the Showcase, a new Showcase Showdown game based on the One Bid round on the daytime series.

The new game was known as “The Price Was Right”. The three contestants who were called down stood behind a set of lecterns at the apron of the stage, and a vintage television commercial played on a large onstage video screen. They would then offer a guess as to how much the item advertised cost in the year the commercial aired, and the closest bidder without going over won the chance to play for the Showcase.

The New Price Is Right also employed the daytime series’ Big Wheel for the Showcase Showdown in several episodes recorded early in the show’s brief run. An exception was the highest winner spun first. The rules otherwise remained unchanged. The contestant closest to $1.00 without going over advanced, with a spin-off played in case of a tie. Any contestant that hit $1.00 exactly won $1,000 and a chance at either $5,000 or $10,000 with a bonus spin.

== The Showcase ==
Instead of making a bid as on the daytime series, the contestant played a reworked version of a preexisting pricing game, Range Game. The Showcase featured a wider range with a starting value of $10,000 that increased in $1,000 increments to a top value of $70,000. The contestant selected the range at random during the commercial break leading into the Showcase, which varied in value between $4,000 and $10,000.

Following presentation of the showcase, the contestant’s range selection was revealed and the rangefinder began moving up the game board. In order to stop it, the contestant pulled a lever, and if the value of the Showcase was within the covered range, the contestant won the Showcase in addition to any cash or prizes won during his/her pricing game.

== Broadcast information ==
At the NATPE convention in January 1994, Paramount pushed The New Price Is Right as a viable option for stations for their fringe and access periods. By the time NATPE concluded, the show had been sold in 78 markets and was one of the two more popular new entries at the convention, with the other being what would eventually become Warner Bros.’ entertainment news program Extra.

In the New York City market, the show was bought by WWOR for its early afternoon fringe period. There, it was paired with the returning Family Feud and aired at 4:00 p.m. Eastern, one of the more competitive in its market. Meanwhile, in Los Angeles, The New Price Is Right was sold to KNBC, which purchased both it and Extra to air in its Prime Time Access hour in place of Paramount's Entertainment Tonight and Hard Copy; KNBC gave TNPIR the 7:30 p.m. Pacific time that Hard Copy had previously held.

Despite the willingness of station managers to buy the show, Paramount Domestic Television President Steve Goldman expressed doubt that things would work out as well as the company hoped, since the timeslots they were aiming for were highly competitive. As per their two largest affiliates’ examples, The New Price Is Right would be facing off against The Oprah Winfrey Show, then television’s most popular syndicated talk show, in New York and against the highest-rated game show in syndication, Wheel of Fortune, in Los Angeles.

Goldman’s doubts proved correct, as The New Price Is Right did indeed struggle to find an audience. In December 1994, both WWOR and KNBC announced that they would cease carrying the program. In the case of KNBC, their ratings dropped by half from where they had been the previous year at 7:30. WWOR, which was airing The New Price Is Right in tandem with the returning Family Feud, decided to replace the struggling game shows with their popular morning talk show, The Richard Bey Show, as it was scheduled to make a move to nationwide syndication in January 1995. Shortly after this, on December 15, 1994, Paramount announced that they were cancelling The New Price Is Right and ceasing production in January 1995. The eightieth and final first-run episode aired on January 26, 1995, with Paramount continuing to offer reruns to stations that wanted them until the end of the season.
