= List of longest-running British television programmes =

This is a list of the longest-running television programmes in the United Kingdom.

== Running ==
Rank	No. of broadcast years (after year of first broadcast) (Note: Discounting first years of further runs if broadcast non-continuously, except if broadcast in an isolated year)	Title	Network	Genre	Airing between
1	80–81	The Wimbledon Championships	BBC One, and BBC Two	Sports outside broadcast	1937-1939, 1946-2019, 2021-present (Note: Not played during World War II, nor in 2020 due to COVID-19 concerns)
2	80–81	The Lord Mayor's Show	BBC One	Outside broadcast	1937–1938, 1946–present (Note: Not broadcast during World War II (1939–1945))
3	80–81	Remembrance Sunday: The Cenotaph	BBC One	Outside broadcast	1937–1938, 1946–present (Note: Not broadcast during World War II (1939–1945))
4	78–79	The Boat Race	BBC One (1938-1939, 1946-2004, 2010-2019, 2021-2025), ITV (2005-2009), and Channel 4 (2026-present)	Outside broadcast	1938-1939, 1946-2019, 2021–present (Note: Cancelled due to World War II from 1940–1945 and due to Covid-19 in 2020)
5	76–77	Trooping the Colour	BBC One	Outside broadcast	1939, 1947, 1949-1954, 1956–present (Note: Cancelled due to World War II from 1940–1946)
6	73–74	BBC Proms	BBC	Concert outside broadcast	1947-1948, 1953-present (Note: The BBC took over the Proms in 1927, broadcasting through radio)
7	72–73	National Eisteddfod of Wales	BBC One Wales (1953–1982), and S4C (1982–present)	Outside broadcast	1953–present
8	72–73	Royal British Legion Festival of Remembrance	BBC One	Outside broadcast	1953-present
9	72–73	Panorama	BBC One	Current affairs	1953–present
10	71–72	The Royal Edinburgh Military Tattoo	BBC	Outside broadcast	1951-2019, 2022–present (Note: Cancelled due to Covid-19 from 2020-2021)
11	71–72	BBC Weekend News	BBC One	News programme	1969-present
12	71–72	BBC Sports Personality of the Year	BBC	Awards ceremony	1954–present
13	70–71	ITV Weekend News	ITV	News programme	1955-present
14	70–71	ITV Evening News	ITV	News programme	1955-present
15	69–70	Crufts	BBC (1950-1953, 1955-2008), and Channel 4 / More4 (2010-2020, 2022-present)	Dog show outside broadcast	1950-1953, 1955-2008, 2010-2020, 2022–present (Note: Cancelled due to an electricians' strike in 1954 and the Covid-19 pandemic in 2021)
16	69–70	Llangollen International Musical Eisteddfod	BBC One Wales (1954-1982), and S4C (1982-2019, 2021-present)	Outside broadcast	1954–2019, 2021-present (Note: Cancelled due to Covid-19 in 2020)
17	69–70	BAFTA Awards	BBC One, and ITV	Awards ceremony	1956-present
18	68–69	The Sky at Night	BBC One (1957–2013), and BBC Four (2014–present)	Science programme	1957–present
19	67–68	Eurovision Song Contest	Eurovision and Euroradio networks / BBC (1956–2019, 2021–present)	Song contest	1956-2019, 2021-present (Note: The 2020 edition was cancelled due to concerns about Covid-19)
20	67–68	RHS Chelsea Flower Show	BBC	Garden show outside broadcast	1958–present
21	67–68	Final Score	BBC	Sports programme	1958–present
22	67–68	Blue Peter	BBC One (1958–2011), and CBBC (2012–2025)	Children's television show	1958-2025
23	65–66	The Royal Variety Performance	ITV (1960, 1961-2009 on odd-numbered years only, 2011-present), and BBC (1962-2010 on even-numbered years only)	Variety show	1960–present
24	65–66	Coronation Street	ITV	Soap opera	1960–present
25	64–65	Royal Institution Christmas Lectures	BBC One (1936, 1949-1951, 1953, 1957), BBC Two (1966-1999), Channel 4 (2000-2004), Channel 5 (2005-2008), More4 (2009), and BBC Four (2010-present)	Scientific lecture series	1936, 1949-1951, 1953, 1957, 1966-present
26	64–65	Dechrau Canu, Dechrau Canmol (Welsh)	BBC One Wales (1961–1982), and S4C (1982–present)	Religious programme	1961–present
27	64–65	Songs of Praise	BBC One	Religious programme	1961–present
28	62–63	Royal Christmas Message	BBC, ITV, and Sky News	Speech	1957-1958, 1960-1962, 1964-1968, 1970–present
29	61–62	The State Opening of Parliament	BBC	Outside broadcast	1958–2010, 2012-2017, 2019, 2021-2024, 2026-present
30	61–62	Horizon	BBC Two	Science programme	1964–present
31	61–62	Match of the Day	BBC Two (1964–1966), and BBC One (1966–present)	Sports programme	1964–present
32	57–58	Gardeners' World	BBC Two	Gardening	1968–present
33	56–57	Points of View	BBC One	TV feedback show	1961–present
34	56–57	University Challenge	ITV (1962–87), and BBC Two (1994–present)	Quiz	1962–1987, 1994-present
35	53–54	Newsround	BBC One (1972–2012), CBBC (2002–present), and BBC Two (2022–present)	Children's news programme	1972–present
36	53–54	ITV Lunchtime News	ITV	News programme	1972-present
37	53–54	Emmerdale	ITV	Soap opera	1972–present
38	52–53	ITV News at Ten	ITV	News programme	1967–1999, 2001–2004, 2008–present
39	52–53	Cân i Gymru (Welsh)	BBC One (1969), BBC One Wales (1972, 1974-1978, 1982), HTV (1979, 1981), and S4C (1983–present) (Note: BBC Radio Cymru in 1980)	Song contest	1969–1972, 1974–1979, 1981–present
40	51–52	Pobol y Cwm (Welsh)	BBC One Wales (1974–1982), and S4C (1982–present)	Soap opera	1974–present
41	50–51	Sportscene	BBC One Scotland, BBC Two Scotland, and BBC Scotland	Sports	1975–present
42	50–51	Arena	BBC Two (1975–2011), and BBC Four (2003–present)	Documentary	1975–present
43	49–50	Mastermind	BBC One (1972-1997), Discovery Channel (2001–2002), and BBC Two (2003–present) (Note: BBC Radio 4 from 1998-2000)	Quiz	1972–1997, 2001-present
44	49–50	Landward	BBC One Scotland, BBC Two Scotland, and BBC Scotland	Rural and agricultural affairs	1976–present
45	48–49	It'll Be Alright on the Night	ITV	Bloopers programme	1977–2016
46	47–48	Football Focus	BBC One	Sports programme	1974-1988, 1992–present
47	47–48	Ski Sunday	BBC Two	Sports programme	1978–present
48	47–48	Beechgrove Garden	BBC One Scotland, BBC Two Scotland, and BBC Scotland	Gardening	1978–present
49	47	Doctor Who	BBC One	Science fiction	1963–1989, 1996, 2005-2025
50	46–47	Antiques Roadshow	BBC One	Antiques programme	1979–present
51	46–47	Question Time	BBC One	Political panel programme	1979–present
52	45–46	Newsnight	BBC Two	News programme	1980–2012
53	45–46	BBC Children in Need	BBC One, and BBC Two	Charity telethon	1980–2012, 2023
54	44–45	London Marathon	BBC	Sports	1981–present
55	44–45	See Hear	BBC Two	Deaf magazine programme	1981–present
56	43–44	Wales This Week	ITV	Current affairs	1982–present
57	43–44	Newyddion S4C (Welsh)	S4C	News programme	1982–present
58	43–44	Countdown	Channel 4	Game show	1982–2009, 2013-present
59	43–44	Channel 4 News	Channel 4	News programme	1982–present
60	43–44	Y Byd ar Bedwar (Welsh)	S4C	Current affairs	1982–present
61	43–44	Noson Lawen (Welsh)	S4C	Variety entertainment show	1982–present
62	43–44	Cefn Gwlad (Welsh)	S4C	Rural and agricultural affairs	1982–present
63	41–42	BBC News at Six	BBC One, and BBC News	News programme	1984–present
64	40–41	BRIT Awards	BBC One (1985-1992), and ITV (1993-present)	Awards ceremony	1985–present
65	40–41	EastEnders	BBC One	Soap opera	1985–present
66	39–40	Casualty	BBC One	Medical drama	1986–present
67	39–40	Lifeline	BBC One	Charity appeal programme	1986–present
68	39–40	BBC News at One	BBC One, and BBC News	News programme	1986–present
69	38–39	Dispatches	Channel 4	Current affairs	1987–present
70	37–38	Countryfile	BBC One	Rural and agricultural affairs news magazine	1988–present
71	37–38	This Morning	ITV	Daytime magazine programme	1996-2018
72	37–38	Sgorio (Welsh)	S4C	Sports	1988–present
73	36–37	Olivier Awards	BBC One (1981-1992), BBC Two (1993-2003, 2026), BBC Red Button (2011-2012), and ITV (2013-2025) (Note: Not broadcast on television from 2004-2010)	Awards ceremony	1981–2003, 2011-present
74	36–37	Prime Minister's Questions	BBC Parliament	Politics	1989-present
75	35–36	Have I Got News for You	BBC Two (1990-2000), and BBC One (2000-2017)	Satirical panel show	1990–2017
76	33–34	Soccer Saturday	Sky Sports	Sports programme	1992–present
77	33–34	Super Sunday	Sky Sports	Sports	1992–present
78	33–34	Later... with Jools Holland	BBC Two	Music	1992–2013, 2018-2019
79	32–33	Eòrpa (Scottish Gaelic)	BBC Alba	Current affairs	1993-present
80	32–33	Alternative Christmas Message	Channel 4	Speech	1993–present
81	31–32	MasterChef	BBC One (2014-2025)	Cooking competition	2014-2025
82	31–32	The National Lottery Draws	BBC One (1994–2006)	Game show	1994–2006
83	30–31	Catchphrase	ITV	Game show	1986–1987, 1989-1992, 1994-2004, 2013-2015, 2018-2021, 2022-present
84	30–31	Monday Night Football	Sky Sports	Sports	1992–2007, 2010-present
85	30–31	NFL on Sky Sports	Sky Sports	Sports	1995-present
86	30–31	Rownd a Rownd (Welsh)	S4C	Soap opera	1995–present
87	30–31	Hollyoaks	Channel 4 (1995–present), E4 (2001–present), and All 4 (2022–present)	Soap opera	1995–present
88	29–30	Silent Witness	BBC One	Drama	1996–present
89	29	World Business Report	BBC News, BBC One, and BBC Two	Business news programme	1995-2024
90	28–29	National Television Awards	ITV	Awards ceremony	1995–2008, 2010-present
91	28–29	Midsomer Murders	ITV	Detective series	1997–present
92	28–29	5 News	Channel 5	News programme	1997–present
93	28–29	Storyville	BBC Two, and BBC Four	Documentary	1997–present
94	28–29	Ffermio (Welsh)	S4C	Rural and agricultural affairs	1997–present
95	28–29	Clwb Rygbi (Welsh)	S4C	Sports programme	1997–present
96	28	HARDtalk	BBC News	Interview show	1997–2025
97	27–28	Prynhawn Da (Welsh)	S4C	Magazine show	1998–present
98	26–27	Sky News at 10	Sky News	News programme	1999–present
99	26–27	Tonight	ITV	Current affairs	1999–present
100	26–27	Grand Designs	Channel 4	Documentary	1999–present
101	26–27	Loose Women	ITV	Talk show	1999–present
102	26–27	DIY SOS	BBC One	DIY	1999–present
103	25–26	Heno (Welsh)	S4C	Magazine and chat show	1990-2002, 2012-present
104	25–26	Bargain Hunt	BBC One	Antiques programme	2000–present
105	25–26	Pride of Britain Awards	ITV	Awards ceremony	2000–present
106	25–26	Location, Location, Location	Channel 4	Property show	2000–present
107	25–26	Unreported World	Channel 4	Current affairs	2000–present
108	25–26	A Place in the Sun	Channel 4	Property show	2000–present
109	25–26	BBC Breakfast	BBC One, and BBC News	News programme	2000–present
110	25–26	BBC News at Ten	BBC One, and BBC News	News programme	2000–present
111	25	Click	BBC	Review show	2000–2025
112	24–25	ITV Racing	ITV	Horse racing programme	1969-1985, 2017-present
113	24–25	BBC Young Musician	BBC One (1978-1984), BBC Two (1986-2012, 2024-present), and BBC Four (2002-present)	Music competition	1978-present (even-numbered years only, plus 2021)
114	24–25	Saturday Kitchen	BBC Two (2001-2005), and BBC One (2006-present)	Cooking show	2001–present
115	24	Doctors	BBC One	Soap Opera / Medical Drama (Day Time)	2000–2024
116	24	BBC Sportsday	BBC News, BBC One, and BBC Two	Sports news programme	2001–2025
117	23–24	Never Mind the Buzzcocks	BBC Two (1996-2012)	Music-based panel show	1996-2012
118	23–24	Who Wants to Be a Millionaire?	ITV	Quiz	1998–2010, 2013-2014
119	23–24	I'm a Celebrity...Get Me Out Out of Here!	ITV	Reality competition	2003-2019, 2022-present
120	23–24	Sky News Today	Sky News	News programme	2002–present
121	23–24	River City	BBC One Scotland, BBC Two Scotland, and BBC Scotland	Drama	2002–present
122	23–24	Escape to the Country	BBC One	Property show	2002–present
123	23–24	Celebrity Mastermind	BBC One (2011-2021)	Quiz	2011-2021
124	22–23	Homes Under the Hammer	BBC One	Property show	2003–present
125	22–23	QI	BBC Four, BBC Two, and BBC One	Panel show	2003–2018
126	22	British Soap Awards	ITV	Awards ceremony	1999-2019, 2022-2023, 2025
127	22	imagine...	BBC One	Documentary	2003-2025
128	21–22	Sunday Supplement	Sky Sports	Sports discussion programme	1999-2020, 2025-present
129	21–22	Strictly Come Dancing	BBC One	Talent show	2004, 2009-2011, 2013-present
130	21–22	Who Do You Think You Are?	BBC Two (2004-2006), and BBC One (2006-present)	Documentary	2004–present
131	21–22	BBC Newswatch	BBC News, and BBC One	TV feedback show	2012–present
132	21–22	Strictly Come Dancing: It Takes Two	BBC Two	Aftershow	2004–2007, 2018-2019
133	21–22	The Big Fat Quiz of the Year	Channel 4	Panel show	2004–2012, 2017, 2023-present
134	20–21	Red Nose Day	BBC One, and BBC Two	Charity telethon	1983-1985, 988-2013
135	21	Match of the Day 2	BBC Two (2004-2012), and BBC One (2012-2025)	Sports programme	2004-2025
136	20–21	Blankety Blank	BBC One (1979-1990, 1997-1999, 2020-present), and ITV (2001-2002, 2016)	Game show	1979-1990, 1997-1999, 2001-2002, 2016, 2020–present
137	20–21	Big Brother	Channel 4 (2002-2010), Channel 5 (2011-2018)	Reality competition	2002-2018
138	20–21	Dragons' Den	BBC Two (2005–2020), and BBC One (2021–present)	Reality competition	2005–present
139	20–21	Come Dine with Me	Channel 4	Reality	2005–present
140	20–21	The Apprentice	BBC Two (2005–2006), and BBC One (2007-present)	Reality competition	2005–present
141	20–21	Pocoyo	CITV (series 1–2), Nick Jr. (series 3), and ITVX (series 4–present)	Preschool series	2005–2010, 2016–present
142	20–21	Springwatch	BBC Two	Nature	2005-present
143	20–21	The Hotel Inspector	Channel 5	Documentary	2005-present
144	19–20	The Blame Game	BBC One Northern Ireland (Note: First broadcast on BBC Radio Ulster in 2005)	Panel show	2006–present
145	19–20	Great British Menu	BBC Two	Cooking competition	2006–present
146	19–20	The One Show	BBC One	Magazine and chat show	2014–present
147	19–20	Celebrity MasterChef	BBC One (2006-2011, 2013-present), and BBC Two (2012)	Cooking competition	2006–present
148	19	Glastonbury	Channel 4 (1994-1995), and BBC (1997-2000, 2002-2005, 2007-2011, 2013-2017, 2019, 2022-2025)	Performing arts festival outside broadcast	1994-1995, 1997-2000, 2002-2005, 2007-2011, 2013-2017, 2019, 2022-2025
149	19	The Apprentice: You're Fired	BBC Three (2006), and BBC Two (2007-2025)	Aftershow	2006–2025
150	18–19	Dickinson's Real Deal	ITV	Antiques programme	2006–2024, 2026-present
151	18–19	Animal Park	BBC One	Documentary	2000–2009, 2016–present
152	18–19	I'm a Celebrity: Unpacked	ITV2	Aftershow	2002-2019, 2024–present
153	18–19	The Graham Norton Show	BBC Two (2007–2009), and BBC One (2009–2018)	Talk show	2007–2018
154	18–19	Britain's Got Talent	ITV	Variety talent show	2007-2020, 2022–present
155	18–19	Would I Lie to You?	BBC One	Panel show	2009-2021, 2023-present
156	18	Celebrity Big Brother	Channel 4 (2002-2010), Channel 5 (2011-2018)	Reality competition	2002-2018
157	18	The Adventure Show	BBC Two Scotland (2007-2018), BBC Scotland (2019-2024), and BBC Alba (2025)	Sports programme	2007–2025
158	17–18	The Weakest Link	BBC Two, and BBC One	Quiz	2000–2012, 2017, 2021–present
159	17–18	Crimewatch Live	BBC One	Crime programme	2000-2001, 2009-present
160	17–18	Live at the Apollo	BBC One (2004-2005, 2007-2015), and BBC Two (2015-2019, 2021-present)	Stand-up comedy	2004–2005, 2007-2019, 2021-present
161	17–18	Mock the Week	BBC Two (2005-2012, 2017, 2022), and TLC (2026)	Panel show	2005–2012, 2017, 2022, 2026
162	17–18	Police Interceptors	Channel 5	Documentary	2008–present
163	17–18	MasterChef: The Professionals	BBC Two (2008-2019), and BBC One (2020-present)	Cooking competition	2008–present
164	17–18	Only Connect	BBC Four (2008–2014), and BBC Two (2014–present)	Quiz	2008–present
165	17–18	Seachd Là (Scottish Gaelic)	BBC Alba	News programme	2008-present
166	17–18	Trusadh (Scottish Gaelic)	BBC Alba	Documentary	2008-present
167	16–17	Bullseye	ITV (1981-1995, 2024-present), and Challenge (2006)	Game show	1981-1995, 2006, 2024–present
168	16–17	CBeebies Bedtime Stories	CBeebies	Children's stories	2009–present
169	16–17	The Chase	ITV	Quiz	2014–present
170	16–17	Pointless	BBC One (2013–present)	Quiz	2013–present
171	16–17	Rip Off Britain	BBC One	Factual	2009–present
172	16	Ant & Dec's Saturday Night Takeaway	ITV	Variety	2002–2009, 2013-2018
173	15–16	A Ghost Story for Christmas	BBC One (1971-1978), BBC Four (2005-2006, 2018-2019), and BBC Two (2010, 2013, 2021-present)	Horror	1971-1978, 2005-2006, 2010, 2013, 2018-2019, 2021-present
174	15–16	Peppa Pig	Channel 5, and Nick Jr.	Children's programme	2004, 2006-2007, 2009–2012, 2015–present
175	15–16	My Life	CBBC, and BBC Two	Documentary	2010–present
176	15–16	Antiques Road Trip	BBC Two (2010-2012), and BBC One (2013-present)	Antiques programme	2010–present
177	15–16	Four in a Bed	Channel 4	Reality competition	2010–present
178	15–16	Sunday Morning Live	BBC One	Religious and current affairs	2010–present
179	15–16	The Great British Bake Off	BBC Two (2010–2013), BBC One (2014–2016), and Channel 4 (2017–present)	Baking competition	2010–present
180	15–16	Lorraine	ITV	Morning magazine show	2010–present
181	15–16	The Only Way Is Essex	ITV2 (2010–2014, 2025-present), and ITVBe (2014–2025)	Reality	2010–present
182	15–16	FYI Daily	ITV2, ITV3, and ITV4	Entertainment news	2010–present
183	15	Fifth Gear	Channel 5 (2002-2011), Discovery (2012-2014), History (2015), and Quest (2018-2019, 2024)	Automotive show	2002-2015, 2018-2019, 2024
184	15	Dancing on Ice	ITV	Talent show	2006–2014, 2018–2025
185	15	A League of Their Own	Sky One (2010–2021), and Sky Max (2021–2025)	Panel show	2010–2025
186	14–15	Sam Tân / Fireman Sam	Welsh: S4C; English: BBC One (1987-1988, 1990, 1994), CBeebies (2005), Cartoonito (2008-2009), and Channel 5 (2012, 2014, 2016-2018, 2020–present)	Children's programme	1987–1988, 1990, 1994, 2005, 2008-2009, 2012, 2014, 2016-2018, 2020-present
187	14–15	Monkey Life	Channel 5, Animal Planet, and Sky Nature	Documentary	2007-2013, 2015-2016, 2018–present
188	14–15	Mrs. Brown's Boys (Note: Made in partnership with Irish broadcaster RTÉ)	BBC One	Sitcom	2011–present
189	14–15	Long Lost Family	ITV	Documentary	2011–present
190	14–15	Made In Chelsea	E4	Reality	2011–present
191	14–15	24 Hours in A&E	Channel 4	Medical documentary	2011–present
192	14–15	Newsday	BBC News, and BBC One	News programme	2011–present
193	14–15	The Jonathan Ross Show	ITV	Talk show	2011–present
194	14–15	Exposure	ITV	Current affairs	2011–present
195	14–15	Scotland Tonight	STV	Current affairs	2011–present
196	14–15	Christmas University Challenge	BBC Two	Quiz	2013–present
197	14	Vera	ITV	Crime drama	2011–2025
198	13–14	Deal or No Deal	Channel 4 (2005-2016), and ITV1 (2023-present)	Game show	2005-2016, 2023–present
199	13–14	Soccer Aid	ITV	Charity sports event	2006, 2008, 2010, 2012, 2014, 2016, 2018-present
200	13–14	Great British Railway Journeys	BBC Two	Travel documentary	2010–2021, 2023-present
201	13–14	Death in Paradise	BBC One	Mystery	2011, 2013–present
202	13–14	8 Out of 10 Cats Does Countdown	Channel 4	Panel show	2013–present
203	13–14	Call the Midwife	BBC One	Drama	2012–present
204	13–14	Winterwatch	BBC Two	Nature	2012-present
205	13–14	The Voice UK	BBC One (2013–2016), and ITV (2017-present)	Talent show	2013–present
206	13–14	Sunday Brunch	Channel 4	Cookery talk show	2012-present
207	13–14	Tipping Point	ITV	Quiz show	2012-present
208	13–14	The Last Leg	Channel 4	Topical panel	2012–2014, 2022
209	13–14	The Martin Lewis Money Show	ITV	Financial current affairs	2012–present
210	13–14	Stand Up to Cancer	Channel 4	Charity telethon	2012–present
211	13–14	George Clarke's Amazing Spaces	Channel 4	Documentary	2012–present
212	13	Kate Garraway's Life Stories	ITV	Talk show	2009, 2013, 2019-present
213	13	Food Unwrapped	Channel 4	Consumer show	2012–2025
214	12–13	Wheel of Fortune	ITV	Game show	1988-1989, 1991-2001, 2024-present
215	12–13	BBC New Comedy Awards	BBC One (1995-1999, 2021-present), BBC Choice (2000-2002), and BBC Three (2003, 2021-present) (Note: BBC Radio 4 Extra (2004-2006, 2011–2019), BBC Radio 2 (2011–2015), and BBC Radio 4 (2016–2019))	Comedy	1995-2003, 2021-present
216	12–13	Something Special	CBeebies	Children's programme	2003, 2006-2008, 2010-2012, 2014, 2016-2018, 2020, 2022-present
217	12–13	Not Going Out	BBC One	Sitcom	2006–2007, 2009, 2011-2015, 2017-2023, 2025-present
218	12–13	Geordie Shore	MTV	Reality	2011–2022, 2024-present
219	12–13	The Dumping Ground	CBBC	Children's drama programme	2013–present
220	12–13	Talking Pictures	BBC Two	Documentary	2013–present
221	12–13	Father Brown	BBC One	Mystery	2013–present
222	12–13	Car S.O.S	National Geographic	Automotive show	2013–present
223	12–13	The Travel Show	BBC News (World), BBC Two, and BBC News (UK)	Travel programme	2013–present
224	12–13	Gogglebox	Channel 4	Reality	2013–present
225	12–13	The Great British Sewing Bee	BBC Two (2013-2019), and BBC One (2020-present)	Sewing competition	2013–present
226	12–13	Ben Fogle: New Lives in the Wild	Channel 5	Documentary	2013–present
227	12–13	The Women's Football Show	BBC One	Sports programme	2013–present
228	12–13	First Dates	Channel 4	Reality dating	2013–present
229	12–13	Artist of the Year	Sky Arts	Competition	2013–present
230	11–12	Waterloo Road	BBC One (2006-2011, 2023-present)	School drama	2006-2011, 2023-present
231	11–12	For the Love of Dogs	ITV	Documentary	2012-2019, 2021–present
232	11–12	Good Morning Britain	ITV	Breakfast television	2014–present
233	11–12	24 Hours in Police Custody	Channel 4	Crime documentary	2014–present
234	11	Côr Cymru (Welsh)	S4C	Music competition	2003, 2005, 2007, 2009, 2011, 2013, 2015, 2017, 2019, 2022, 2024
235	11	The Great British Bake Off: An Extra Slice	BBC Two (2014-2016), and Channel 4 (2017-2025)	Aftershow	2014–2025
236	10–11	Shaun the Sheep	CBBC, BBC One, and BBC Two	Animated comedy	2007, 2009-2010, 2012-2016, 2019-2022, 2025-present
237	10–11	Fake or Fortune?	BBC One	Documentary	2011–2012, 2014-2019, 2021-present
238	10–11	The Real Housewives of Cheshire	ITVBe (2015-2025), and ITV2 (2026-present)	Reality	2015–present
239	10–11	Love Island	ITV2	Reality dating	2015–present
240	10–11	Taskmaster	Dave (2015-2019), and Channel 4 (2020-present)	Panel game show	2015–present
241	10–11	Inside the Factory	BBC Two	Documentary	2015–present
242	10–11	Money for Nothing	BBC One	DIY	2015–present
243	10–11	The Yorkshire Vet	Channel 5	Reality documentary	2015–present
244	10	You Bet!	ITV	Game show	1988-1997, 2024–2025
245	9–10	Digging for Britain	BBC Two	Documentary	2010-2011, 2015-2020, 2022–present
246	9–10	Operation Ouch!	CBBC	Children's medical programme	2012-2013, 2015-2017, 2019–present
247	9–10	Bargain-Loving Brits in the Sun	Channel 5	Reality documentary	2016–present
248	9–10	A New Life in the Sun	Channel 4	Property show	2016–present
249	9–10	Bake Off: The Professionals	BBC Two (2016-2017), and Channel 4 (2018-present)	Cooking competition	2016–present
250	9–10	Garddio a Mwy (Welsh)	S4C	Gardening	2016–present
251	9–10	Garden Rescue	BBC One	Gardening	2016–present
252	9–10	Saving Lives at Sea	BBC Two	Documentary	2016–present
253	9–10	Celebs Go Dating	E4	Reality dating	2016–present
254	9–10	Ambulance	BBC One	Documentary	2016–present
255	9–10	Our Lives	BBC One Northern Ireland (2016-present), and BBC One (2017-present)	Documentary	2016–present
256	9–10	Priodas Pum Mil (Welsh)	S4C	Reality	2016–present

== Ended ==
Years (Note: No. of broadcast years after year of first broadcast, discounting first years of further runs if broadcast non-continuously (except if broadcast in an isolated year))	Title	Network	Genre	Airing between	First broadcast	Last broadcast	Notes
62	Up (ITV series)	ITV (1964-1991, 2005-2026), and BBC One (1998)	Documentary	1964–2026	5 May 1964	22 September 2026	The BBC version (also made by a unit of ITV Studios) started in April 2000 with two episodes of 28 Up: Millennial Generation broadcast on 29 September 2021 and 6 October 2021, giving a timeframe of 21 years for the BBC programme and 57 years for the overall Up format. The final series aired in 2026, directed by Asif Kapadia.
52	Eurovision: You Decide (Note: Previously Festival of British Popular Songs (1956-1957), Eurovision Song Contest British Final (1959-1960), A Song for Europe (1961-1995, 2000-2003), The Great British Song Contest (1996-1999), Eurovision: Making Your Mind Up (2004-2007), Eurovision: Your Decision (2008), and Eurovision: Your Country Needs You (2009-2010))	BBC One (1956-1957, 1959-1976, 1978, 1980-2010), BBC Four (2016), and BBC Two (2017-2019)	Song contest	1956-1957, 1959-1976, 1978, 1980-2010, 2016-2019 (Note: Not a selection for the Eurovision Song Contest until 1957)	7 May 1956	8 February 2019	The UK national selection for the Eurovision Song Contest most recently went by the name Eurovision: You Decide from 2016-2019. In 1977 it was not televised, due to industrial action by BBC cameramen and technicians minutes before the show went live. A recording of the contest was transmitted a few hours later on BBC Radio 2. The 1979 edition of A Song for Europe was abandoned due to a strike by BBC sound engineers.
52	What the Papers Say	Granada Television / Associated-Rediffusion / Scottish Television / Thames Television (1956-1982), Channel 4 (1982-1988), ITV (1988-1989), and BBC Two (1990-2008) (Note: BBC Radio 4 from 2010-2016)	News programme	1956–2008	5 November 1956	8 March 2008	The programme was revived on BBC Radio 4 in the run-up to the 2010 general election, and continued until 27 March 2016, when it was announced that that was its last Radio 4 episode.
51	Scotsport	STV (1957-2008), and ITV Border Scotland (1987–2008)	Sports programme	1957–2008	18 September 1957	22 May 2008	
50	A Question of Sport	BBC One	Quiz show	1968, 1970-1972, 1974-1977, 1979–2023	2 December 1968	8 September 2023	
49	Grandstand	BBC One, and BBC Two	Sports programme	1958–2007	11 October 1958	28 January 2007	
46	The Film Show	BBC One	Entertainment review	1971–2018	16 November 1971	28 March 2018	
44	This Is Your Life	BBC One (1955-1964, 1994-2003), and ITV (1969-1994, 2007)	Documentary	1955–1964, 1969–2003, 2007	29 July 1955	2 June 2007	
44	The Money Programme	BBC Two	Finance programme	1966–2010	5 April 1966	9 November 2010	
44	Top Gear	BBC Two (2002–2020)	Automotive show	2002-2020	22 April 2002	18 December 2020	
43	Come Dancing	BBC One	Talent show	1950-1981, 1983-1986, 1988-1996, 1998	29 September 1950	29 December 1998	The celebrity show Strictly Come Dancing has been broadcast on the BBC since 2004.
43	The South Bank Show	ITV (1978–2010), and Sky Arts (2012–2023)	Art programme	1978–2010, 2012–2023	14 January 1978	29 August 2023	
42	Top of the Pops	BBC	Chart programme	1964–2006	1 January 1964		Two special best of the year editions (with one billed as the Christmas show and the other as the New Year show) have been usually scheduled each year since 2006, with the last new episode going out on BBC One on 31 December 2021, giving a total of 57 years. In addition to these shows BBC Four have been broadcasting new Big Hits compilation shows and Story of... documentaries since 2006.
38	Tomorrow's World	BBC One	Science and technology	1965–2003	7 July 1965	16 July 2003	Tomorrow's World returned for a one-off live special, with Hannah Fry and four presenters from the show's original run: Maggie Philbin, Howard Stableford, Judith Hann and Peter Snow in 2018. The 90-minute interactive show was broadcast at 9 pm on BBC Four on 22 November 2018.
38	Holiday	BBC One, and BBC Two	Travel	1969–2007	2 January 1969	19 March 2007	The travelogue series ended in 2007, 8 years after the murder of Jill Dando.
35	World in Action	ITV	Current affairs	1963–1998	7 January 1963	7 December 1998	
34	One Man and His Dog	BBC Two	Sheepdog trials	1976-1996, 1998-2012	17 February 1976		It aired from 2013 to 2023 as a special annual edition of the rural affairs show Countryfile on BBC One.
33	The Sooty Show	BBC1 (1955-1967), and ITV (1968-1978, 1980-1981, 1983-1992)	Children's programme	1955-1978, 1980-1981, 1983-1992	16 January 1955	30 November 1992	
33	Crimewatch	BBC One	Crime programme	1984–2010	7 June 1984	20 March 2010	A spin-off programme, Crimewatch Live, continues to air on an ad-hoc basis as part of BBC One's daytime schedule.
33	Watchdog	BBC One	Consumer investigative journalism	1980, 1985-2012 2022	14 July 1980	17 October 2022	Watchdog started out as a feature on BBC1's news magazine programme Nationwide in 1980, moving to Sixty Minutes after the programme ended and becoming a stand-alone series after that show also ended. After the regular series was cancelled after 2012, Watchdog became a feature segment on Wednesday night episodes of The One Show, with Matt Allwright and Nikki Fox continuing to present the reports.
32	Jackanory	BBC1 (1965-1996), and CBBC (2006)	Children's programme	1965–1996, 2006	13 December 1965	4 December 2006	The format was revived as Jackanory Junior, airing on CBeebies between 2007 and 2009.
32	Last of the Summer Wine	BBC One	Sitcom	1973, 1975-1979, 1981-1993, 1995-2010	4 January 1973	29 August 2010	
32	Channel 4 Racing	Channel 4, and More4	Horse racing programme	1984–2016	22 March 1984	27 December 2016	
32	You've Been Framed!	ITV	Comedy	1990-2004	14 April 1990	27 August 2004	
31	Police 5	ITV (1962-1992), and Channel 5 (2014)	Factual	1962-1992, 2014	30 June 1962	25 March 2014	
31	Call My Bluff	BBC2 (1965-1985, 1987-1988, 1994), and BBC One (1996-2005)	Panel show	1965–1985, 1987-1988, 1994, 1996–2005	17 October 1965	17 July 2005	A special aired in March 2011 for Red Nose Day 2011 as part of the BBC marathon panel show 24 Hour Panel People.
30	The Good Old Days	BBC1	Old time variety	1953-1983	20 July 1953	31 December 1983	
30	The Benny Hill Show	BBC1, and ITV	Comedy	1955, 1957-1961, 1964-1989	15 January 1955	1 May 1989	
30	HOW	ITV, and CITV	Children's educational programme	1966–1981, 1990-2006, 2020	22 March 1966	6 May 2020	
30	BBC Nine O'Clock News	BBC One	News programme	1970–2000	14 September 1970	13 October 2000	
30	Grange Hill	BBC One (1985–2002)	Teen drama	1985–2002	8 February 1985	15 September 2002	
30	Sunrise	Sky News	News	1989–2019	6 February 1989	13 October 2019	
29	Sportsnight	BBC1	Sports programme	1968-1997	12 September 1968	14 May 1997	
29	Wish You Were Here...?	ITV	Travel	1974-2003	7 January 1974	29 June 2003	ITV commissioned a new version of the show for 2008, Wish You Were Here...? Now & Then, giving Judith Chalmers' son Mark Durden-Smith the role of main host, along with Sarah Heaney. It revisited destinations featured in the original series to see how much they have changed, and was filmed within production studios and not directly on location.
29	Timewatch	BBC Two	History series	1982–2011	29 September 1982	15 November 2011	
29	Soccer AM	Sky Sports	Football-based comedy talk show	1994-2023	20 August 1994	27 May 2023	
28	Crackerjack	BBC1 (1963-1984)	Children's programme	1963–1984	14 September 1963	5 March 1984	
28	This Week (1956 TV programme)	ITV	Current affairs	1956–1978, 1986-1992	6 January 1956	17 December 1992	
28	It's a Knockout / Gemau Heb Ffiniau	BBC1 (1966-1988), ITV (1990), S4C (1991-1994), and Channel 5 (1999-2001)	Game show	1966–1988, 1990–1994, 1999–2001	7 August 1966	6 January 2001	
28	Ffeil (Welsh)	S4C	Children's news programme	1995–2023	September 1995	July 2023	
27	Record Breakers	BBC One	Children's programme	1972-1983, 1985-2001	15 December 1972	21 December 2001	
27	The Bill	ITV	Police drama	1983–2010	16 August 1983	31 August 2010	The programme originated from a one-off drama, "Woodentop" (part of the show Storyboard), broadcast on 16 August 1983. Also includes the spin-off Murder Investigation Team (2003–2005). On 26 March 2010, ITV had announced that The Bill would be axed due to a dramatic drop in ratings and on 31 August 2010, The Bill aired its final-ever episode at the end of the 26th series.
26	Crossroads	ITV	Soap opera	1969–1988	2 November 1969	30 May 1988	
26	On the Ball	ITV	Sports programme	1965-1985, 1998-2004	1965	15 May 2004	On the Ball was a segment on World of Sport before it was revived as its own show in 1998.
26	Dateline London	BBC News	News discussion programme	1996-2022	1996	15 October 2022	
25	Mr and Mrs	TWW (1965–1967), ITV (1967–1988, 1999), and UK Living (1995–1996)	Game show	1965-1988, 1995-1996, 1999	23 February 1965	2 July 1999	The show was part of the second series of Gameshow Marathon and aired on 12 May 2007. Phillip Schofield started to host a celebrity revival called All Star Mr & Mrs in 2008, with this new version lasting until 2016.
25	The Generation Game	BBC One	Game show	1971-1982, 1990-2002, 2011	2 October 1971	8 April 2011	The show ended in 2002 no regular series have been made since Jim Davidson left the series in the early 2000s. A special aired in March 2011 for Red Nose Day 2011 as part of the BBC marathon panel show 24 Hour Panel People.
24	Play School	BBC2 (1964-1983), and BBC1 (1983-1988)	Children's programme	1964–1988	21 April 1964	12 September 1988	
24	The Big Match	ITV	Sports programme	1968–1992	25 August 1968	26 April 1992	Between 1997 and 2001, ITV had the rights to show the FA Cup, both as highlights and live, and ITV revived the name The Big Match. However, when these rights reverted to the BBC, with ITV replacing the BBC as holder of the rights to English top-flight football highlights in 2001, the new programme was simply called The Premiership.
24	Taggart	ITV	Detective fiction	1983, 1985-1990, 1992–2010	6 September 1983	7 November 2010	The pilot which aired between 6-20 September in 1983 was called Killer.
24	ITV News at 5:30	ITV	News programme	1988-2012	15 February 1988	21 December 2012	
24	BBC Scotland Investigates	BBC One Scotland	Current affairs	1994-2018	10 November 1994	14 July 2018	
23	Rainbow	ITV	Children's educational programme	1972–1992, 1994-1997	16 October 1972	24 March 1997	
23	We Are the Champions	BBC1 (1973-1995), and CBBC (2010)	Children's game show	1973-1995, 2010	13 June 1973	12 March 2010	
23	Take the High Road	ITV	Soap opera	1980–2003	19 February 1980	27 April 2003	
23	Top of the Pops 2	BBC	Archive music programme	1994–2017	17 September 1994	22 December 2017	
23	Holby City	BBC One	Medical drama	1999–2022	12 January 1999	29 March 2022	
22	Why Don't You?	BBC1	Children's programme	1973–1995	20 August 1973	21 April 1995	
22	Family Fortunes	ITV	Game show	1990-2002	6 January 1990	4 June 2002	
22	Food and Drink	BBC Two	Food and drink	1982-2002, 2013-2015	6 July 1982	13 April 2015	
22	Thomas & Friends	ITV (1986-1996), Cartoon Network (1996-2001), Nick Jr. (2002-2007), 5 (2008, 2021), (Note: Some episodes were first released direct-to-video)	Children's programme	1986-2008, 2021	9 October 1986	20 January 2008	Rebooted into Thomas & Friends: All Engines Go by Mattel Television & Nelvana, which premiered in autumn 2021 after cancellation on 20 January 2008.
22	Through the Keyhole	ITV (1987-1994), Sky 1 (1996), BBC One (1998-2004), and BBC Two (2006-2008, 2011)	Panel show	1987-2008, 2011	3 April 1987	23 February 2011	A special aired in March 2011 for Red Nose Day 2011 as part of the BBC marathon panel show 24 Hour Panel People.
22	ChuckleVision	BBC One (1989-2009), and CBBC (2002-2009)	Children's programme	1989–2009	26 September 1989	18 December 2009	
21	What's My Line?	BBC Television (1951-1963), BBC2 (1973-1974), ITV (1984-1990), and HTV / Meridian (1994-1996)	Panel game show	1951-1963, 1973-1974, 1984-1990, 1994-1996	16 July 1951	17 December 1996	A special aired in March 2011 for Red Nose Day 2011 as part of the BBC marathon panel show 24 Hour Panel People.
21	Dixon of Dock Green	BBC1	Police drama	1955–1976	9 July 1955	1 May 1976	
21	Heddiw (Welsh)	BBC Television (1961-1964), and BBC Wales (1964-1982)	News programme	1961-1982	17 April 1961	30 July 1982	
21	Animal Magic	BBC1	Children's programme	1962-1983	13 April 1962	8 March 1983	
21	That's Life!	BBC1	Satirical consumer affairs programme	1973-1994	26 May 1973	19 June 1994	
21	Jim'll Fix It	BBC One (1975-1994, 2011), and UKTV Gold (2007)	Children's programme	1975–1994, 2007, 2011	31 May 1975	26 December 2011	
21	An Audience with...	ITV (1980-1981, 1988, 1994-1999, 2001-2002, 2004-2011, 2013, 2021, 2023), and Channel 4 (1983-1985, 1988, 1990)	Entertainment	1980-1981, 1983-1985, 1988, 1990, 1994-1999, 2001-2002, 2004-2011, 2013, 2021, 2023	26 December 1980	10 December 2023	The An Audience With title was first used in a television series produced by London Weekend Television (LWT) for the comedian Jasper Carrott, which aired for six episodes in 1978.
21	Brookside	Channel 4	Soap opera	1982–2003	2 November 1982	4 November 2003	
21	BBC Cardiff Singer of the World	BBC Two (1983–2011), BBC Knowledge (2001), and BBC Four (2003–2023)	Singing competition	1983-2023 (odd-numbered years only)	16 June 1983	15 June 2023	The 2025 edition of the competition has been postponed until 2027 due to the host venue, St David's Hall, being closed to allow for essential work to be carried out to replace the roof. The competition instead staged a televised gala concert, featuring previous winners and competitors, in October 2025 as part of the Wales Millennium Centre's Llais international music festival.
21	Art Attack	ITV / CITV (1990-2007), and Disney Junior (2011-2015)	Children's art programme	1990–2007, 2011–2015	15 June 1990	12 June 2015	
21	Parkinson	BBC One (1971–1982, 1998–2004), and ITV (1987–1988, 2004–2007)	Chat show	1971–1982, 1987–1988, 1998–2007	19 June 1971	22 December 2007	Parkinson was revived again as Parkinson: Masterclass on Sky Arts from 2012–2014. A retrospective show, Parkinson at 50, was broadcast by BBC One on 28 August 2021.
21	Equinox	Channel 4	Science and documentary	1986–2007	31 July 1986	14 January 2007	
21	Fifteen to One	Channel 4	Quiz Show	1988-2003	11 January 1988	28 June 2003	William G. Stewart hosted the original series every weekday afternoons before ending in 2003
20	Tonight at the London Palladium	ITV	Variety show	1955-1969, 1973-1974, 1998, 2000, 2014-2017	25 September 1955	14 June 2017	
20	World of Sport	ITV	Sports programme	1965-1985	2 January 1965	28 September 1985	
20	Surprise Surprise	ITV (1984–2001, 2012–2015), and ITV3 (2015)	Light entertainment	1984–2001, 2012–2015	6 May 1984	26 December 2015	Despite the show's revival ending on 26 July 2015, a previously unbroadcast episode of the show, which was originally produced in 2003 as a one-off special to celebrate the series' 20th anniversary, was broadcast on ITV3 on 27 December 2015, four months after Cilla Black's death. It wasn't originally broadcast at the time due to Black's departure from ITV earlier that year.
20	Blind Date	ITV (1985-2003), and Channel 5 (2017-2018)	Dating game show	1985–2003, 2017-2018	30 November 1985	16 June 2019	Channel 5 broadcast a version of this format with Paul O'Grady between 2017 and 2018, giving Blind Date a span of 34 years.
20	The Really Wild Show	BBC, and CBBC	Children's nature programme	1986–2006	21 January 1986	18 May 2006	
20	British Comedy Awards	ITV (1990-2006, 2008-2009), and Channel 4 (2011-2014)	Awards ceremony	1990-2006, 2008-2009, 2011-2014	16 December 1990	17 December 2014	The 2007 ceremony occurred on 6 December 2007, but the broadcast was suspended by ITV due to allegations of irregularities and deception in the awarding of the 2005 People's Choice Award and then ongoing related investigations about the 2007 British premium-rate phone-in scandal resulting in Ofcom's subsequently fining ITV a record £5.675 million for its misuse of premium-rate telephone lines. The 2010 ceremony, the first to air on Channel 4, was postponed until it finally aired in January 2011. The show was revived as the National Comedy Awards, and aired on Channel 4 from 2022-2023.
20	Time Team	Channel 4	Archaeology	1994–2014	16 January 1994	7 September 2014	In May 2021, Time Team's producer, Tim Taylor announced the return of the series, with free episodes to be shown on YouTube. The first episodes of the revival began appearing on YouTube in 2022.
20	Goals on Sunday	Sky Sports	Sports discussion programme	2000-2020	2000	2020	
20	Eggheads	BBC One (2003–2004), BBC Two (2005–2020), and Channel 5 (2021–2023)	Quiz	2003–2023	10 November 2003	26 April 2023	
19	Going for a Song	BBC One	Game show	1965-1977	31 March 1965	3 February 1977	
19	Pebble Mill at One	BBC1	Magazine show	1972-1986, 1991-1996	2 October 1972	29 March 1996	
19	The Krypton Factor	ITV	Game show	1977–1995, 2009	7 September 1977	9 March 2009	
19	Right to Reply	Channel 4	TV feedback show	1982-2001	14 November 1982	20 April 2001	
19	The Gadget Show	Channel 5	Consumer technology review	2004–2023	7 June 2004	14 July 2023	
18	Opportunity Knocks	BBC 1949-1950 ITV (1968-1978)	Talent show	1949-1950, 1968–1978	20 June 1949	2 June 1978	The show started out as a radio show on 18 February 1949 on the BBC Light Programme, moving to Radio Luxembourg in the 1950s.
18	Armchair Theatre	ITV	Drama anthology series	1956-1974	8 July 1956	9 July 1974	The programme also had several spin-off series including Armchair Mystery Theatre, Out of This World, Armchair Cinema and Armchair Thriller.
18	Y Dydd (Welsh)	TWW (1964-1968), and HTV Cymru Wales (1968-1982)	News programme	1964-1982	1964	29 October 1982	
18	The Old Grey Whistle Test	BBC2 (1971-1988), and BBC Four (2018)	Music	1971-1988, 2018	21 September 1971	23 February 2018	On 23 February 2018, a one-off live three-hour special of The Old Grey Whistle Test was broadcast on BBC Four to mark 30 years since the final episode had been broadcast.
18	Kilroy	BBC One	Talk show	1986-2004	24 November 1986	23 January 2004	
18	Heartbeat	ITV	Police procedural period drama	1992–2010	10 April 1992	12 September 2010	The programme had two spin-offs, namely The Royal (2003–2011) and The Royal Today (2008).
18	Flog It!	BBC Two	Antiques programme	2002-2020	27 May 2002	4 May 2020	
18	Inside Out	BBC One	Current affairs	2002-2020	9 September 2002	30 March 2020	
18	The Sarah-Jane Mee Show	Sky News	News programme	2005-2023	24 October 2005	31 August 2023	
17	Take Your Pick!	BBC 1952, ITV 1955-1968, 2005, 2020, 2022	Game show	1952, 1955-1968, 2005, 2020, 2022	23 September 1955	23 December 1968	Take Your Pick! was originally broadcast by Radio Luxembourg starting in 1952. The show was part of the first series of Gameshow Marathon and aired on 24 September 2005. Take Your Pick! was also one of the formats used for Alan Carr's Epic Gameshow, with episodes of the game appearing on ITV as part of series 1 (13 June 2020) and series 2 (13 August 2022).
17	Man Alive	BBC2	Documentary and current affairs	1965-1982	4 November 1965	6 June 1982	
17	Ask the Family	BBC1 (1967-1971, 1973-1984), UK Gold (1999), and BBC Two (2005)	Game show	1967-1971, 1973-1984, 1999, 2005	12 July 1967	5 May 2005	
17	Byker Grove	BBC One (1989–2005), and CBBC (2006)	Teen drama	1989–2006	8 November 1989	10 December 2006	
17	Stars in Their Eyes	ITV	Talent show	1990-2006, 2015	21 July 1990	23 December 2006	In 2022-2023, ITV aired Starstruck, a similar format which was described by some media outlets as a revived and reformatted version of Stars in Their Eyes.
17	GMTV	GMTV: ITV (1993-2010); GMTV2: ITV2 (1999-2008), CITV (2006-2010), and ITV4 (2008-2010)	Breakfast television	1993–2010	1 January 1993	3 September 2010	ITV's current breakfast show Good Morning Britain uses the name of GMTV's predecessor, broadcast by ITV company TV-am between 1983 and 1992. This gives the Good Morning Britain breakfast programme brand a span of 40 years as of 2023.
17	Ready Steady Cook	BBC	Cooking show	1994-2010, 2020-2021	24 October 1994	15 April 2021	
17	Live at Five	Sky News	News programme	1999-2016		2016	The programme was rebranded as simply Sky News at Five (and Sky News at Six) in 2011. In October 2016, the programme was axed as part of a schedule change.
17	Hacio (Welsh)	S4C	Current affairs for young people	2000-2017	2000	1 June 2017	
17	Autumnwatch	BBC Two	Nature	2005-2022	8 November 2005	28 October 2022	The BBC decided to axe Autumnwatch in 2023, saying that more money could then be put into its twin programmes Springwatch and Winterwatch, which generally received more viewers. Following the cancellation of Autumnwatch as a standalone programme, the format and title were brought back into use in the form of short reports and features on autumnal nature within The One Show in October 2023.
16	Comedy Playhouse	BBC One	Sitcom anthology	1961-1975, 2014, 2016-2017	15 December 1961	15 September 2017	
16	The Two Ronnies	BBC1 (1971-1972, 1976-1987), and BBC2 (1973-1976)	Comedy sketch show	1971-1987	10 April 1971	25 December 1987	
16	Weekend World	ITV	Current affairs	1972-1988	1972	1988	
16	The Paul Daniels Magic Show	BBC1	Magic	1977, 1979-1994	31 December 1977	18 June 1994	
16	Uned 5	S4C	Youth magazine show	1994-2010	17 February 1994	30 May 2010	
16	Room 101	BBC Radio 5 1992-1994, BBC Two (1994-2007) BBC Radio 4 2023	Comedy	1992-2007, 2023	4 July 1992	6 April 2023	Room 101 started as a radio show from 1992-1994 on BBC Radio 5 before transferring to television. The radio show was revived on BBC Radio 4 in 2023.
16	This Week (2003 TV programme)	BBC One	Political current affairs	2003-2019	16 January 2003	18 July 2019	
16	The Andrew Marr Show	BBC One	Talk show	2005–2021	11 September 2005	19 December 2021	
15	Young Scientists of the Year	BBC1	Educational competition	1966-1981	7 July 1966	15 February 1981	
15	Sale of the Century	ITV (1971-1983), Sky One (1989-1991), and Challenge TV (1997-1998)	Game show	1971-1983, 1989-1991, 1997-1998	9 October 1971	1998	The show was part of the first series of Gameshow Marathon and aired on 8 October 2005.
15	Blockbusters	ITV (1984-1989, 1990-1995, 2007)	Quiz show	1984-1989, 1990-1995, 2007	29 August 1984	5 December 2007	The show was part of an episode of the second series of Gameshow Marathon and aired on 14 April 2007.
15	Dòtaman (Scottish Gaelic)	BBC One Scotland	Children's programme	1985-2000	17 October 1985	8 December 2000	
15	The Clothes Show	BBC One (1986-1998), UKTV Style / Really (2006-2009)	Factual	1986-1998, 2006-2009	13 October 1986	2009	
15	London's Burning	ITV	Drama	1986, 1988–2002	7 December 1986	25 August 2002	
15	60 Seconds	BBC Choice (2001-2003), and BBC Three (2003-2016)	News programme	2001-2016	16 July 2001	16 February 2016	
15	Daily Politics	BBC Two (Monday–Friday), and BBC One (Sunday)	Political current affairs	2003-2018	6 January 2003	24 July 2018	
15	Sky World News	Sky News	News programme	2005-2020	2005	2020	
14	Top of the Form	BBC1	Quiz show	1953-1954, 1962-1975	25 April 1953	9 August 1975	The radio version aired from 1 May 1948 to 2 December 1986 on the BBC Light Programme (1948-1967), BBC Radio 2 (1967-1970) and BBC Radio 4 (1970-1986).
14	Sportsview	BBC1	Sports programme	1954-1968	8 April 1954	1968	
14	Z-Cars	BBC1	Police procedural	1962–1965, 1967–1978	2 January 1962	20 September 1978	Spin-offs included Softly, Softly (1966-1969), Softly, Softly: Task Force (1969-1976) and Barlow at Large (1971, 1973-1975).
14	Nai Zindagi Naya Jeevan (Hindi, Urdu, Hindustani)	BBC1	Magazine show	1968-1982	24 October 1968	13 June 1982	
14	Nationwide	BBC1	Current affairs	1969-1983	9 September 1969	5 August 1983	
14	Screen Test	BBC1	Children's game show	1970-1984	18 November 1970	20 December 1984	
14	Winner Takes All	ITV (1975-1988), and Challenge TV (1997)	Game show	1975-1988, 1997	20 April 1975	1997	
14	The Price is Right	ITV (1984–1988, 1995–2001, 2006–2007), Sky One (1989-1990), and Channel 4 (2017)	Game show	1984–1990, 1995–2001, 2006–2007, 2017	24 March 1984	30 December 2017	The show was part of both series of Gameshow Marathon and aired on 17 September 2005 and 7 April 2007. The Price is Right was also one of the formats used for Alan Carr's Epic Gameshow, with episodes of the game appearing on ITV as part of series 1 (6 June 2020 and a Christmas special on 24 December 2020) and series 2 (17 April 2021 and a Christmas special on 23 December 2021).
14	The Chart Show	Channel 4 (1986-1989, 2003), ITV (1989-1998), and Chart Show TV (2008-2009)	Music	1986-1998, 2003, 2008-2009	11 April 1986	May 2009	
14	On the Record	BBC One	Political current affairs	1988–2002	18 September 1988	15 December 2002	
14	The National Lottery: In It to Win It	BBC One	Game show	2002-2016	18 May 2002	16 July 2016	
14	8 Out of 10 Cats	Channel 4 (2005-2015), More4 (2016-2017), and E4 (2017, 2019-2021)	Panel show	2005–2017, 2019-2021	3 June 2005	17 January 2021	
14	The X Factor	ITV	Talent show	2004–2018	4 September 2004	2 December 2018	This total does not include the 2019 spin-offs The X Factor: Celebrity or The X Factor: The Band.
14	The Jeremy Kyle Show	ITV	Tabloid talk show	2005–2019	4 July 2005	10 May 2019	The show ended on 10 May 2019 following the death of a guest named Steve Dymond after failing a lie detector test.
14	BBC News at Five	BBC News	News programme	2006-2020	3 April 2006	13 March 2020	
14	World News Today	BBC News, BBC One, and BBC Four	Current-affairs news programme	2006-2020	30 May 2006	20 March 2020	
14	The Big Questions	BBC One	Religion and ethics	2007-2021	9 September 2007	21 March 2021	
14	Celebrity Juice	ITV2	Panel show	2008-2022	24 September 2008	15 December 2022	
13	Double Your Money	ITV	Game show	1955-1968	26 September 1955	22 July 1968	Originally broadcast on Radio Luxembourg since 1950.
13	Play Away	BBC2	Children's programme	1971-1984	1971	1984	
13	Jackanory Playhouse	BBC	Children's programme	1972-1985	1972	1985	
13	Play Your Cards Right	ITV	Game show	1980–1987, 1994-1999, 2002-2003	1 February 1980	20 June 2003	The show was part of both series of Gameshow Marathon and aired on 15 October 2005 and 26 May 2007. Play Your Cards Right was also one of the formats used for Alan Carr's Epic Gameshow, with episodes of the game appearing on ITV as part of series 1 (27 June 2020 and a celebrity special on 30 May 2020), series 2 (6 August 2022 and a celebrity special on 3 April 2021) and series 3 (a celebrity special on 18 June 2022).
13	Only Fools and Horses	BBC One	Sitcom	1988-2003, 2005-2011	8 September 1988	25 December 2011	Only Fools and Horses had two spin-offs, namely The Green Green Grass (2005–2009) and Rock & Chips (2010–2011).
13	40 Minutes	BBC2	Documentary	1981–1994	1981	1994	Some documentaries in the original series were revisited and updated in a 2006 version, Forty Minutes On.
13	Screen Two	BBC Two	Anthology drama	1985-1998	6 January 1985	21 June 1998	
13	Telly Addicts	BBC One	Quiz Show	1985-1998	3 September 1985	29 July 1998	
13	Goals on Sunday (1989 TV programme)	ITV	Sports programme	1989-2002	8 October 1989	22 April 2002	
13	Westminster Live	BBC Two	Political current affairs	1989-2002	21 November 1989	19 December 2002	
13	Pingu	SF DRS (Switzerland) / ZDF (Germany) (1990-2000), and CBeebies (2003-2006)	Children's programme	1990-2000, 2003-2006	7 March 1990	3 March 2006	Two test animations were made in 1980 and one in 1986. A spin-off, Pingu in the City, first aired on NHK Educational TV in Japan from October 7, 2017 to March 30, 2019.
13	Get Your Own Back	BBC One	Children's game show	1991–2004	26 September 1991		
13	A Touch of Frost	ITV	Detective drama	1992, 1994-1997, 1999-2006, 2008, 2010	6 December 1992	5 April 2010	
13	SMart	BBC One (1994–2004)	Children's art programme	1994–2004	5 October 1994	4 April 2004	
13	The Vicar of Dibley	BBC One	Sitcom	1994, 1996-2000, 2004–2007, 2020	10 November 1994	1 January 2007	
13	Banged Up Abroad	Channel 5	Documentary	2006–2015, 2018-2022	March 2006	December 2022	
13	Don't Tell the Bride	BBC Three (2007-2014), BBC One (2015), Sky 1 (2016), and E4 (2017-2020)	Reality	2007-2020	8 November 2007	16 March 2020	
12	Vision On	BBC1	Children's programme for visually impaired children	1964-1976	6 March 1964	11 May 1976	
12	The Basil Brush Show	BBC1	Children's programme	1968–1980	14 June 1968	1980	A show with the same name ran from 2002 to 2007 but was a sitcom whereas the original show was a variety show.
12	Magpie	ITV	Children's programme	1968-1980	30 July 1968	6 June 1980	
10	Crown Court	ITV	Courtroom drama	1972-1984	18 October 1972	29 March 1984	
12	Name That Tune	ITV (1976-1987), and Channel 5 (1997-1998)	Game show	1976-1987, 1997-1998	7 April 1976	29 December 1998	Name That Tune was a 15-minute slot on the popular entertainment series Wednesday at Eight, which went on to become London Night Out, until it became a half-hour weekly series in 1983. The show was part of the second series of Gameshow Marathon and aired on 5 May 2007. Name That Tune was also one of the formats used for Alan Carr's Epic Gameshow, with episodes of the game appearing on ITV as part of series 2 (24 April 2021 and a celebrity special on 15 May 2021).
12	Give Us a Clue	ITV (1979-1986, 1988-1992), and BBC One (1997)	Game show	1979-1986, 1988-1992, 1997	2 January 1979	19 December 1997	A special aired in March 2011 for Red Nose Day 2011 as part of the BBC marathon panel show 24 Hour Panel People.
12	Spitting Image	ITV	Satire	1985–1996	26 February 1985	18 February 1996	In 2020, a new version of the show was made for international streamer BritBox with input from American and British writers. A couple of the episodes from the revived series, such as the Halloween Special (30 October 2021), have been also shown on ITV, the original broadcast channel of Spitting Image when it debuted 37 years earlier.
12	The Cook Report	ITV	Current affairs	1987-1999	22 July 1987	24 August 1999	
12	Poirot	ITV	Detective fiction	1989–1993, 1995-1996, 2000-2001, 2003-2006, 2008-2010, 2013	8 January 1989	13 November 2013	
12	Breakfast with Frost	BBC One	Current affairs	1993-2005	3 January 1993	29 May 2005	
12	Jonathan Dimbleby	ITV	Political current affairs	1994-2006	9 April 1994	7 May 2006	
12	BBC Wildlife Specials	BBC One	Nature documentary	1995, 1997, 1999-2004, 2007-2010, 2013-2014, 2018	14 April 1995	30 December 2018	
12	Scrapheap Challenge	Channel 4	Game show	1998-2010	12 April 1998	27 June 2010	
12	New Tricks	BBC One	Police procedural comedy drama	2003–2015	27 March 2003	6 October 2015	
12	The Xtra Factor	ITV2	Talent companion show	2004–2016	4 September 2004	11 December 2016	
12	Coach Trip	Channel 4 (2005-2006, 2009-2012, 2014-2015), and E4 (2016-2022)	Reality game show	2005-2006, 2009-2012, 2014-2022	7 March 2005	21 January 2022	
12	Britain's Got More Talent	ITV2	Variety talent companion show	2007–2019	9 June 2007	2 June 2019	This title was replaced by a new companion show, Britain's Got Talent: Unseen, on the ITV Hub in 2020. Britain's Got Talent: Unseen was next released in 2025 on ITVX and from 2026 was broadcast on ITV2 in a Sunday afternoon slot.
12	Love Your Garden	ITV	Gardening	2011–2023	10 June 2011	2023	
11	Christmas Night with the Stars	BBC One	Entertainment	1958-1960, 1962-1964, 1967-1972, 1994, 2003	25 December 1958	25 December 2003	
11	Wheelbase	BBC2	Automotive show	1964-1975	1964	1975	
11	Are You Being Served?	BBC One	Sitcom	1972-1979, 1981, 1983, 1985, 2016	8 September 1972	28 August 2016	
11	Gambit	ITV (1975-1985), and Anglia (1995)	Game show	1975-1985, 1995	3 July 1975	5 November 1995	
11	Strike It Lucky	ITV	Game show	1986-1994, 1996-1999	29 October 1986	23 August 1999	Rebranded as Strike It Rich from 1996 to 1999. Strike It Lucky was one of the formats used for Alan Carr's Epic Gameshow, with episodes of the game appearing on ITV as part of series 1 (20 June 2020), series 2 (1 May 2021 and a celebrity special on 22 May 2021) and series 3 (2 July 2022 and a celebrity version on 23 July 2022).
11	The Time, The Place	ITV	Talk show	1987-1998	7 September 1987	20 March 1998	
11	Whose Line Is It Anyway?	Channel 4	Improvisational comedy panel show	1988-1999	23 September 1988	4 February 1999	A special aired in March 2011 for Red Nose Day 2011 as part of the BBC marathon panel show 24 Hour Panel People.
11	Birds of a Feather	BBC One (1989-1994, 1996-1998), and ITV (2014-2017, 2020)	Sitcom	1989–1994, 1996-1998, 2014-2017, 2020	16 October 1989	24 December 2020	
11	Children's Ward	ITV	Children's drama programme	1989–2000	15 March 1989	4 May 2000	
11	Breakfast News	BBC One	News programme	1989–2000	2 October 1989	15 September 2000	
11	Big Break	BBC One	Game show	1991–2002	30 April 1991	9 October 2002	
11	999	BBC One	Docudrama	1992-2003	25 June 1992	17 September 2003	
11	The Big Breakfast	Channel 4	Light entertainment	1992-2002, 2021-2022	28 September 1992	3 September 2022	
11	They Think It's All Over	BBC One	Sport-based panel show	1995-2006	14 September 1995	9 June 2006	The show was originally produced for BBC Radio 5, where it aired from 1992-1994. A special aired in March 2011 for Red Nose Day 2011 as part of the BBC marathon panel show 24 Hour Panel People.
11	My Family	BBC One	Sitcom	2000–2011	19 September 2000	2 September 2011	
11	Harry Hill's TV Burp	ITV	Comedy	2001–2004, 2006-2012	22 December 2001	7 April 2012	
11	60 Minute Makeover	ITV (2004-2014), and Quest Red (2018)	Home interior design	2004-2014, 2018	19 April 2004	2 March 2018	
11	The Culture Show	BBC Two	Magazine programme	2004–2015	11 November 2004	24 January 2015	
10	Clapperboard	ITV	Children's programme	1972-1982	14 April 1972	1 January 1982	
10	Gharbar (Hindustani)	BBC2 (1977-1983, 1986-1987), and BBC1 (1983-1986)	Magazine show	1977-1987	19 October 1977	28 April 1987	
10	3-2-1	ITV	Game show	1978-1988	29 July 1978	24 December 1988	
10	The Book Tower	ITV	Children's programme	1979-1989	3 January 1979	16 May 1989	
10	Postman Pat	BBC1 (1981-1982, 1990-1992, 1994-1995, 1997), and CBeebies (2004, 2006-2008, 2013, 2016-2017) (Note: Episodes which were first released direct-to-video are counted by their television premiere)	Children's programme	1981-1982, 1990-1992, 1994-1995, 1997, 2004, 2006-2008, 2013, 2016-2017	16 September 1981	29 March 2017	
10	Wogan	BBC1	Talk show	1982-1992	4 May 1982	3 July 1992	Wogan presented Wogan Now and Then in 2006, for UKTV Gold, where he spoke again with former guests from original series along with new guests. Thirteen hour-long episodes were made. In March 2015, BBC Two launched a new compilation series, Wogan: the Best Of, featuring selected interview segments and music performances from Wogan's past chat series, linked by new introductions.
10	First Tuesday	ITV	Documentary	1983-1993	5 April 1983	2 November 1993	
10	Highway	ITV	Religion	1983-1993	23 October 1983	1 August 1993	
10	Alas Smith and Jones	BBC2 (1984-1988), and BBC One (1989-1998)	Sketch comedy	1984–1992, 1995, 1997-1998	31 January 1984	14 October 1998	
10	Crosswits	ITV	Quiz Show	1985, 1987-1994, 1996, 1998	3 September 1985	23 December 1998	
10	Beadle's About	ITV	Comedy	1986-1996	22 November 1986	31 October 1996	
10	Inspector Morse	ITV	Detective drama	1987–1993, 1995-1998, 2000	6 January 1987	15 November 2000	Inspector Morse had two spin-offs, namely Lewis (2006–2015) and Endeavour (2012–2014, 2016-2021, 2023).
10	Going for Gold	BBC1 (1987-1996), and Five (2008-2009)	Game show	1987-1996, 2008-2009	12 October 1987	20 March 2009	
10	Crimewatch File	BBC One	Crime programme	1988-1996, 1998-2000	10 August 1988	4 April 2000	
10	Wipeout	Galaxy / Sky One (1990-1992), and BBC One (1994-2002)	Game show	1990-1992, 1994-2002	1 October 1990	3 December 2002	
10	Supermarket Sweep	ITV (1993-2001, 2007, 2020), and ITV2 (2019)	Game show	1993-2001, 2007, 2019-2020	6 September 1993	19 December 2020	
10	Animal Hospital	BBC One	Factual	1994-2004	29 August 1994	13 September 2004	
10	Jonathan Creek	BBC One	Comedy crime drama	1997–2004, 2009-2010, 2013-2014, 2016	10 May 1997	28 December 2016	
10	Child of Our Time	BBC One (2000-2002, 2004-2008, 2010, 2013, 2017), and BBC Two (2020)	Documentary	2000-2002, 2004-2008, 2010, 2013, 2017, 2020	23 February 2000	11 March 2020	
10	Bandit (Welsh)	S4C	Music	2001-2011	2001	28 December 2011	
10	Wedi 7 (Welsh)	S4C	Magazine and chat show	2002-2012	7 January 2002	29 February 2012	
10	Sport Relief	BBC One, and BBC Two	Charity telethon	2002-2012 (even-numbered years only)	13 July 2002	13 March 2012	
10	Doc Martin	ITV	Medical comedy-drama	2004–2007, 2009, 2011, 2013, 2015, 2017, 2019, 2022	2 September 2004	25 December 2022	
10	Who Dares Wins	BBC One	Game show	2007-2008, 2010-2019	17 November 2007	7 September 2019	
10	Match of the Day Kickabout	CBBC, and BBC Two	Sports programme	2011-2021	8 January 2011	27 March 2021	

== See also ==
- List of longest-running American television series
- List of longest-running American cable television series
- List of longest-running American primetime television series
- List of longest-running American first-run syndicated television series
- List of longest-running American broadcast network television series
- List of longest-running Australian television series
- List of longest-running Indian television series
- List of longest-running Philippine television series
- List of longest-running Spanish television series
- List of television series canceled after one episode
