= List of Bullseye (British game show) episodes =

The following is a complete list of episodes for the British game show Bullseye. The programme premiered on ITV in 1981, and originally ran for fourteen years.

== Series overview ==
Series overview
Series	Presenter	Scorer	Episodes	Originally released	
Series	Presenter	Scorer	Episodes	First released	Last released
ITV (1981–1995)
1	Jim Bowen	Jim Bowen	13	28 September 1981	21 December 1981
2	Jim Bowen	Tony Green	16	10 October 1982	23 January 1983
3	Jim Bowen	Tony Green	27	27 November 1983	3 June 1984
4	Jim Bowen	Tony Green	31	2 September 1984	21 April 1985
5	Jim Bowen	Tony Green	26	1 September 1985	16 March 1986
6	Jim Bowen	Tony Green	28	31 August 1986	8 March 1987
7	Jim Bowen	Tony Green	27	13 September 1987	13 March 1988
8	Jim Bowen	Tony Green	27	18 September 1988	30 April 1989
9	Jim Bowen	Tony Green	27	29 October 1989	13 May 1990
10	Jim Bowen	Tony Green	27	2 September 1990	17 March 1991
11	Jim Bowen	Tony Green	26	1 September 1991	8 March 1992
12	Jim Bowen	Tony Green	26	6 September 1992	28 February 1993
13	Jim Bowen	Tony Green	18	26 March 1994	23 July 1994
14	Jim Bowen	Tony Green	13	1 April 1995	8 July 1995
Ant & Dec's Gameshow Marathon (2005)
Gameshow Marathon Special	Ant & Dec	Tony Green	1	22 October 2005	
Challenge (2006)
15	Dave Spikey	Tony Green	30	17 April 2006	22 September 2006
Vernon Kay's Gameshow Marathon (2007)
Gameshow Marathon Special	Vernon Kay	Tony Green	1	19 May 2007	
Alan Carr's Epic Gameshow (2020–2022)
Epic Gameshow Special	Alan Carr	Richard Ashdown	5	4 July 2020	16 July 2022
ITV (2024–present)
Christmas Special	Freddie Flintoff	Richard Ashdown	1	22 December 2024	
16	Freddie Flintoff	Richard Ashdown	4	9 November 2025	30 November 2025
Christmas Special	Freddie Flintoff	Richard Ashdown	1	25 December 2025	
Soccer Aid Special	Freddie Flintoff	Richard Ashdown	1	23 May 2026	
Christmas Special	Freddie Flintoff	Richard Ashdown	1	December 2026	
17	Freddie Flintoff	Richard Ashdown	TBA	2027	TBA

== Episodes ==
=== ITV (1981–1995) ===
==== Series 1 ====
No. overall	No. in series	Professional	Pro Score	Bully's Star Prize	Original release date
1	1	Bobby George	TBA	TBA	28 September 1981
2	2	Maureen Flowers	260	TBA	5 October 1981
3	3	Alan Evans	215	Caravan - Sprite Alpine (Lost)	12 October 1981
4	4	Eric Bristow	185	Car - Austin Metro (Won)	19 October 1981
5	5	Bill Lennard	305	Speedboat - Fletcher (Lost)	26 October 1981
6	6	Tony Brown	151	TBA	2 November 1981
7	7	Ceri Morgan	146	Caravan - Sprite Alpine (Lost)	9 November 1981
8	8	Jocky Wilson	295	Speedboat - Fletcher (Won)	16 November 1981
9	9	Dave Whitcombe	240	Car - Austin Allegro (Lost)	23 November 1981
10	10	John Lowe	260	Caravan - Sprite Alpine (Lost)	30 November 1981
11	11	Linda Batten	304	Car - Morris Ital (Lost)	7 December 1981
12	12	Cliff Lazarenko	245	Speedboat - Fletcher (Lost)	14 December 1981
13	13	Tony Green	185	Car - Morris Ital (Won)	21 December 1981

==== Series 2 ====
No. overall	No. in series	Professional	Pro Score	Bully's Star Prize	Original release date
14	1	Cliff Lazarenko	TBA	TBA	10 October 1982
15	2	Tony Skuse	TBA	TBA	17 October 1982
16	3	Eric Bristow	TBA	TBA	24 October 1982
17	4	Maureen Flowers	165	Car - Austin Metro (Won)	31 October 1982
18	5	Ceri Morgan	242	Caravan (Lost)	7 November 1982
19	6	Linda Batten	116	Speedboat - Fletcher (Lost)	14 November 1982
20	7	Bill Lennard	281	Car - Mini (Won)	21 November 1982
21	8	Angus Ross	179	Caravan (Lost)	28 November 1982
22	9	Tony Brown	245	Car - Talbot Samba (Lost)	5 December 1982
23	10	Steve Brennan	260	Speedboat - CJR 14 (Won)	12 December 1982
24	11	Jocky Wilson	205	Car - Austin Metro (Lost)	19 December 1982
25	12	Christmas Special: Eric Bristow, Margo MacDonald, Cliff Lazarenko, Katharine Whitehorn, Maureen Flowers, Nigel Mansell	TBA	TBA	26 December 1982
26	13	Dave Whitcombe	TBA	TBA	2 January 1983
27	14	John Corfe	150	Speedboat - Fletcher (Won)	9 January 1983
28	15	Alan Glazier	TBA	TBA	16 January 1983
29	16	Alan Evans	TBA	TBA	23 January 1983

==== Series 3 ====
No. overall	No. in series	Professional	Pro Score	Bully's Star Prize	Original release date
30	1	Jocky Wilson	226	Car - Vauxhall Nova (Won)	27 November 1983
31	2	Linda Lewis	TBA	TBA	4 December 1983
32	3	Tony Brown	TBA	TBA	11 December 1983
33	4	Neil Adams	TBA	TBA	18 December 1983
34	5	Christmas Special: Eric Bristow, Anne Diamond, Keith Deller, Kenneth Kendall, Maureen Flowers, Judith Hann and Anne Aston	TBA	TBA	25 December 1983
35	6	Duncan Norvelle	TBA	TBA	1 January 1984
36	7	Lance Percival	TBA	TBA	8 January 1984
37	8	Bobby George	TBA	TBA	15 January 1984
38	9	Leighton Rees	TBA	TBA	22 January 1984
39	10	Acker Bilk	TBA	TBA	29 January 1984
40	11	Nick Owen	TBA	TBA	5 February 1984
41	12	Steve Brennan	TBA	TBA	12 February 1984
42	13	Bill Lennard	TBA	TBA	19 February 1984
43	14	Norman Vaughan	TBA	TBA	26 February 1984
44	15	Linda Batten	TBA	TBA	11 March 1984
45	16	Lionel Blair	TBA	TBA	18 March 1984
46	17	Paul Lim	TBA	TBA	25 March 1984
47	18	Keith Deller	TBA	TBA	1 April 1984
48	19	The Mighty Atom	TBA	TBA	8 April 1984
49	20	John Lowe	TBA	TBA	15 April 1984
50	21	Steve Jones	TBA	TBA	22 April 1984
51	22	Ceri Morgan	TBA	TBA	29 April 1984
52	23	Ted Moult	TBA	TBA	6 May 1984
53	24	Cliff Lazarenko	TBA	TBA	13 May 1984
54	25	Dave Whitcombe	TBA	TBA	20 May 1984
55	26	Bob Champion	TBA	TBA	27 May 1984
56	27	Duncan Goodhew	TBA	TBA	3 June 1984

==== Series 4 ====
No. overall	No. in series	Professional	Original release date
57	1	Jocky Wilson	2 September 1984
58	2	George Best	9 September 1984
59	3	Peter Locke	16 September 1984
60	4	Joe Brown	23 September 1984
61	5	Alan Glazier	30 September 1984
62	6	Gary Wilmot	7 October 1984
63	7	Mike Gregory	14 October 1984
64	8	Tessa Sanderson	21 October 1984
65	9	Dave Lee	28 October 1984
66	10	Faith Brown	4 November 1984
67	11	Alan Evans	11 November 1984
68	12	Pat Roach	18 November 1984
69	13	Steve Brennan	25 November 1984
70	14	Carol Lee Scott	2 December 1984
71	15	Anthony King	9 December 1984
72	16	Henry Cooper	16 December 1984
73	17	Christmas Special: Eric Bristow, Keith Deller, Jocky Wilson, Tommy Boyd, Margaret Harris, Kathy Staff, Rod Hull, Alvin Stardust and Vivienne Rooke	23 December 1984
74	18	Cliff Lazarenko	30 December 1984
75	19	Jimmy Greaves	6 January 1985
76	20	Sharon Kemp	13 January 1985
77	21	Jimmy Cricket	20 January 1985
78	22	Terry O'Dea	27 January 1985
79	23	Lil Coombes	3 February 1985
80	24	Paul Henry	10 February 1985
81	25	Leighton Rees	24 February 1985
82	26	Sharron Davies	10 March 1985
83	27	Bobby George	17 March 1985
84	28	Kenny Lynch	24 March 1985
85	29	Bob Anderson	31 March 1985
86	30	The Krankies	14 April 1985
87	31	Eric Bristow	21 April 1985

==== Series 5 ====
No. overall	No. in series	Professional	Original release date
88	1	Alan Evans	1 September 1985
89	2	Cliff Lazarenko	8 September 1985
90	3	Peter Masson	15 September 1985
91	4	Lil Coombes	22 September 1985
92	5	Terry O'Dea	29 September 1985
93	6	Gerry Hayward	6 October 1985
94	7	Bob Anderson	13 October 1985
95	8	Cathy Gibson	20 October 1985
96	9	Bobby George	27 October 1985
97	10	Sharon Kemp	3 November 1985
98	11	John Cosnett	10 November 1985
99	12	Steve Brennan	17 November 1985
100	13	Keith Deller	24 November 1985
101	14	Fred McMullen	1 December 1985
102	15	Eric Bristow	8 December 1985
103	16	Jocky Wilson	22 December 1985
104	17	Mike Gregory	29 December 1985
105	18	Linda Batten	5 January 1986
106	19	Sandra Lee	19 January 1986
107	20	Leighton Rees	26 January 1986
108	21	Ritchie Gardner	2 February 1986
109	22	Dave Lee	9 February 1986
110	23	Alan Glazier	16 February 1986
111	24	Maureen Flowers	23 February 1986
112	25	John Lowe	9 March 1986
113	26	John Lowe	16 March 1986

==== Series 6 ====
No. overall	No. in series	Professional	Original release date
114	1	John Lowe; Bob Anderson	31 August 1986
115	2	Maureen Flowers	7 September 1986
116	3	Keith Deller	14 September 1986
117	4	Lillian Barnett	21 September 1986
118	5	Eric Bristow	28 September 1986
119	6	Linda Batten	5 October 1986
120	7	Peter Locke	12 October 1986
121	8	Rab McKenzie	19 October 1986
122	9	Fred McMullen	26 October 1986
123	10	Jocky Wilson	2 November 1986
124	11	Mark Day	9 November 1986
125	12	Dennis Hickling	16 November 1986
126	13	Ritchie Gardner	23 November 1986
127	14	Terry Collins	30 November 1986
128	15	Sharon Kemp	7 December 1986
129	16	Terry O'Dea	14 December 1986
130	17	Leighton Rees	21 December 1986
131	18	Christmas Special: Ray Alan, Lord Charles, Bob Anderson, Eric Bristow, Frank Carson, Sarah Greene, John Lowe and Fatima Whitbread	28 December 1986
132	19	Mike Gregory	4 January 1987
133	20	Cathy McCulloch	11 January 1987
134	21	Malcolm Davies	18 January 1987
135	22	Lionel Smith	25 January 1987
136	23	Sonya Ralphs	1 February 1987
137	24	Kevin Kenny	8 February 1987
138	25	John Cosnett	15 February 1987
139	26	Linda Batten	22 February 1987
140	27	Cliff Lazarenko	1 March 1987
141	28	John Lowe	8 March 1987

==== Series 7 ====
No. overall	No. in series	Professional	Original release date
142	1	Keith Deller	13 September 1987
143	2	Sonja Ralphs	20 September 1987
144	3	Dave Lee	27 September 1987
145	4	John Lowe	4 October 1987
146	5	Terry Collins	11 October 1987
147	6	Linda Batten	18 October 1987
148	7	Ritchie Gardner	25 October 1987
149	8	Peter Evison	1 November 1987
150	9	Maureen Flowers	8 November 1987
151	10	Eric Bristow	15 November 1987
152	11	Mike Gregory	22 November 1987
153	12	Jocky Wilson	29 November 1987
154	13	Cathy McCulloch	6 December 1987
155	14	Peter Locke	13 December 1987
156	15	Cliff Lazarenko	20 December 1987
157	16	Christmas Special: Eric Bristow, Duggie Brown, Geoff Capes, Bob Carolgees, Cliff Lazarenko, Rustie Lee, Jan Leeming, Steve Nallon, Gerry Thomas and Jocky Wilson	27 December 1987
158	17	Alan Evans	3 January 1988
159	18	Dave Whitcombe	10 January 1988
160	19	Bob Anderson	17 January 1988
161	20	Leighton Rees	24 January 1988
162	21	Chris Johns	31 January 1988
163	22	Bobby George	7 February 1988
164	23	Alan Glazier	14 February 1988
165	24	Ronnie Sharp	21 February 1988
166	25	Ray Farrell	28 February 1988
167	26	Sharon Kemp	6 March 1988
168	27	Lionel Smith	13 March 1988

==== Series 8 ====
No. overall	No. in series	Professional	Original release date
169	1	Ray Farrell	18 September 1988
170	2	Bill Lennard	25 September 1988
171	3	Alan Warriner	2 October 1988
172	4	Deta Hedman	9 October 1988
173	5	Ritchie Gardner	16 October 1988
174	6	Alan Glazier	23 October 1988
175	7	Bobby George	30 October 1988
176	8	Dave Whitcombe	6 November 1988
177	9	Peter Evison	13 November 1988
178	10	Bob Anderson	20 November 1988
179	11	Leighton Rees	27 November 1988
180	12	Ann Thomas	4 December 1988
181	13	Mike Gregory	11 December 1988
182	14	Chris Johns	18 December 1988
183	15	Christmas Special: Les Dennis, Roy Walker, Bob Holness, Jocky Wilson, Bob Anderson and Eric Bristow	25 December 1988
184	16	Cliff Lazarenko	1 January 1989
185	17	Maureen Flowers	22 January 1989
186	18	Eric Bristow	29 January 1989
187	19	Ronnie Sharp	5 February 1989
188	20	Bert Vlaardinger	12 February 1989
189	21	John Lowe	19 February 1989
190	22	Jocky Wilson	12 March 1989
191	23	Keith Deller	19 March 1989
192	24	Mark Day	26 March 1989
193	25	Cathy McCulloch	2 April 1989
194	26	Paul Reynolds	16 April 1989
195	27	Dave Lee	30 April 1989

==== Series 9 ====
No. overall	No. in series	Professional	Original release date
196	1	Mike Gregory	29 October 1989
197	2	Mandy Solomons	5 November 1989
198	3	Ritchie Gardner	12 November 1989
199	4	Ray Battye	19 November 1989
200	5	Paul Reynolds	26 November 1989
201	6	Bob Anderson	3 December 1989
202	7	Alan Warriner	10 December 1989
203	8	Ronnie Sharp	17 December 1989
204	9	Christmas Special: featuring emergency services teams of two firemen, two nurses and two ambulancemen alongside darts players Chrissy Johns, Cliff Lazarenko and Ronnie Sharp	24 December 1989
205	10	Peter Evison	31 December 1989
206	11	Cliff Lazarenko	7 January 1990
207	12	Eric Bristow	14 January 1990
208	13	Dave Lee	21 January 1990
209	14	Leighton Rees	28 January 1990
210	15	Maureen Flowers	4 February 1990
211	16	Alan Glazier	11 February 1990
212	17	Mark Day	18 February 1990
213	18	Bobby George	25 February 1990
214	19	Dave Whitcombe	11 March 1990
215	20	Keith Deller	25 March 1990
216	21	John Lowe	1 April 1990
217	22	Ray Farrell	8 April 1990
218	23	Chris Johns	15 April 1990
219	24	Jocky Wilson	22 April 1990
220	25	Brian Cairns	29 April 1990
221	26	Dennis Hickling	6 May 1990
222	27	Cathy McCulloch	13 May 1990

==== Series 10 ====
No. overall	No. in series	Professional	Original release date
223	1	Bobby George	2 September 1990
224	2	Ali Timmins	9 September 1990
225	3	Mike Gregory	23 September 1990
226	4	Bob Anderson	30 September 1990
227	5	Keith Deller	7 October 1990
228	6	Chris Whiting	14 October 1990
229	7	Ray Battye	21 October 1990
230	8	Mandy Solomons	28 October 1990
231	9	Phil Taylor	4 November 1990
232	10	Ritchie Gardner	11 November 1990
233	11	Jocky Wilson	18 November 1990
234	12	Peter Evison	25 November 1990
235	13	Eric Bristow	2 December 1990
236	14	Chris Johns	9 December 1990
237	15	Dave Whitcombe	16 December 1990
238	16	Christmas Special: Bobby Davro, Bella Emberg, Paul Shane, Eric Bristow, Bob Anderson and Leighton Rees	23 December 1990
239	17	Maureen Flowers	30 December 1990
240	18	Dennis Hickling	6 January 1991
241	19	Ronnie Sharp	13 January 1991
242	20	Brian Cairns	20 January 1991
243	21	Paul Lim	27 January 1991
244	22	Ray Farrell	3 February 1991
245	23	Cliff Lazarenko	10 February 1991
246	24	Deta Hedman	17 February 1991
247	25	John Lowe	24 February 1991
248	26	Leighton Rees	3 March 1991
249	27	Alan Warriner	17 March 1991

==== Series 11 ====
No. overall	No. in series	Professional	Original release date
250	1	Bob Anderson	1 September 1991
251	2	Raymond van Barneveld	8 September 1991
252	3	Graham Miller	22 September 1991
253	4	Ronnie Sharp	29 September 1991
254	5	Keith Deller	6 October 1991
255	6	Jane Stubbs	20 October 1991
256	7	Ritchie Gardner	27 October 1991
257	8	Eric Bristow	3 November 1991
258	9	Dave Whitcombe	10 November 1991
259	10	Leighton Rees	17 November 1991
260	11	Alan Warriner	24 November 1991
261	12	Dennis Priestley	1 December 1991
262	13	Phil Taylor	8 December 1991
263	14	Bob Taylor	15 December 1991
264	15	Christmas Special: Frank Bruno, Linda Lusardi, John McCririck, Bob Anderson, Dennis Priestley and Phil Taylor	22 December 1991
265	16	Sharon Colclough	29 December 1991
266	17	Sean Palfrey	5 January 1992
267	18	Mandy Solomons	12 January 1992
268	19	Mike Gregory	19 January 1992
269	20	Cliff Lazarenko	26 January 1992
270	21	Chris Johns	2 February 1992
271	22	Jocky Wilson	9 February 1992
272	23	Kevin Kenny	16 February 1992
273	24	Rod Harrington	23 February 1992
274	25	John Lowe	1 March 1992
275	26	Peter Evison	8 March 1992

==== Series 12 ====
No. overall	No. in series	Professional	Original release date
276	1	Mandy Solomons	6 September 1992
277	2	Jamie Harvey	13 September 1992
278	3	Chris Johns	20 September 1992
279	4	Leeanne Maddock	27 September 1992
280	5	Graham Miller	4 October 1992
281	6	Cliff Lazarenko	11 October 1992
282	7	Peter Evison	18 October 1992
283	8	Kevin Kenny	25 October 1992
284	9	Jocky Wilson	1 November 1992
285	10	Mike Gregory	8 November 1992
286	11	Ritchie Gardner	15 November 1992
287	12	Phil Taylor	22 November 1992
288	13	Jane Stubbs	29 November 1992
289	14	Eric Bristow	6 December 1992
290	15	Bob Anderson	13 December 1992
291	16	Dennis Priestley	20 December 1992
292	17	Christmas Special: Liza Goddard, Mandy Solomons, Mike Reid, Rod Harrington, Steve Wright, Phil Taylor and Norris McWhirter	27 December 1992
293	18	Keith Deller	3 January 1993
294	19	Rod Harrington	10 January 1993
295	20	Dave Whitcombe	17 January 1993
296	21	Leighton Rees	24 January 1993
297	22	Steve Beaton	31 January 1993
298	23	Antonio Munoz-Ramos	7 February 1993
299	24	Gerry Haywood	14 February 1993
300	25	Phil Gilman	21 February 1993
301	26	John Lowe	28 February 1993

==== Series 13 ====
No. overall	No. in series	Professional	Original release date
302	1	Mike Gregory	26 March 1994
303	2	Phil Taylor	2 April 1994
304	3	Ronnie Sharp	9 April 1994
305	4	Alan Warriner	16 April 1994
306	5	Scott Coleman	23 April 1994
307	6	Raymond van Barneveld	30 April 1994
308	7	Kevin Kenny	7 May 1994
309	8	Steve Beaton	14 May 1994
310	9	Leeanne Maddock	21 May 1994
311	10	Ronnie Baxter	28 May 1994
312	11	Graham Miller	4 June 1994
313	12	Kevin Painter	11 June 1994
314	13	Cliff Lazarenko	18 June 1994
315	14	Geoff Williams	25 June 1994
316	15	Eric Burden	2 July 1994
317	16	Bobby George	9 July 1994
318	17	Ian Carpenter	16 July 1994
319	18	Dennis Priestley	23 July 1994

==== Series 14 ====
No. overall	No. in series	Professional	Original release date
320	1	Rod Harrington	1 April 1995
321	2	TBA	8 April 1995
322	3	Paul Williams	15 April 1995
323	4	Dave Lee	22 April 1995
324	5	TBA	29 April 1995
325	6	Martin Adams	6 May 1995
326	7	TBA	13 May 1995
327	8	Martin Phillips	20 May 1995
328	9	David Richardson-Page	27 May 1995
329	10	Mandy Solomons	3 June 1995
330	11	TBA	10 June 1995
331	12	TBA	1 July 1995
332	13	TBA	8 July 1995

=== Ant & Dec's Gameshow Marathon (2005) ===
No. overall	No. in series	Professional	Original release date
333	1	Contestants: Vernon Kay, and William Roache; Professional darts players: Eric Bristow, and Andy Fordham	22 October 2005

=== Challenge (2006) ===
==== Series 15 ====
No. overall	No. in series	Professional	Original release date
334	1	TBA	17 April 2006
335	2	TBA	TBA
336	3	TBA	TBA
337	4	TBA	TBA
338	5	TBA	TBA
339	6	TBA	TBA
340	7	TBA	TBA
341	8	TBA	TBA
342	9	TBA	TBA
343	10	TBA	TBA
344	11	TBA	TBA
345	12	TBA	TBA
346	13	TBA	TBA
347	14	TBA	TBA
348	15	TBA	TBA
349	16	TBA	TBA
350	17	TBA	TBA
351	18	TBA	TBA
352	19	TBA	TBA
353	20	TBA	TBA
354	21	TBA	TBA
355	22	TBA	TBA
356	23	TBA	TBA
357	24	TBA	TBA
358	25	TBA	TBA
359	26	TBA	TBA
360	27	TBA	TBA
361	28	TBA	TBA
362	29	TBA	TBA
363	30	TBA	22 September 2006

=== Vernon Kay's Gameshow Marathon (2007) ===
No. overall	No. in series	Professional	Original release date
364	1	Contestants: Andrea Catherwood, Graeme Le Saux, and Michael Le Vell; Professional darts players: Martin Adams, Phil Taylor, and Raymond van Barneveld	19 May 2007

=== Alan Carr's Epic Gameshow (2020–2022) ===
No. overall	No. in series	Professional	Original release date
365	1	TBA	4 July 2020
366	2	TBA	10 April 2021
367	3	Contestants: David Seaman, Angela Griffin, and Chris Kamara; Professional darts players: Fallon Sherrock, Wayne Mardle, and Joe Cullen	8 May 2021
368	4	TBA	25 June 2022
369	5	TBA	16 July 2022

=== ITV (2024–present) ===
==== Christmas Special (2024) ====
No. overall	No. in series	Professional	Original release date
370	1	Luke Littler	22 December 2024

==== Series 16 (2025) ====
No. overall	No. in series	Professional	Original release date
371	1	Luke Littler	9 November 2025
372	2	Luke Humphries	16 November 2025
373	3	Fallon Sherrock	23 November 2025
374	4	Stephen Bunting	30 November 2025

==== Christmas Special (2025) ====
No. overall	No. in series	Professional	Original release date
375	1	Michael van Gerwen	25 December 2025

==== Bullseye for Soccer Aid ====
No. overall	No. in series	Professional	Original release date
376	1	Olly Murs and Mark Wright, Kym Marsh and Jon Richardson	23 May 2026

==== Christmas Special (2026) ====
No. overall	No. in series	Professional	Original release date
377	1	TBA	December 2026

==== Series 17 (2027) ====
No. overall	No. in series	Professional	Original release date
378	1	TBA	2027
