= Richard Ashdown =

English darts referee (born 1978)

- Born: 30 September 1978 (age 47); Harlow, Essex, England
- Occupations: Darts MC and referee, spotter and statistician
- Years active: 2002–present

Richard Ashdown (born 30 September 1978) is an English darts master of ceremonies, referee, spotter and statistician who has worked within the sport of darts since 2002, for broadcasters and organisers of both World Darts Federation and Professional Darts Corporation events.

It was announced in April 2013 that Ashdown would be the new Master of Ceremonies at the Lakeside World Darts Championship for the British Darts Organisation, a role he carried out from 2014 to 2019 and later returned to Lakeside for the World Darts Federation in 2022.

Richard has appeared as an announcer on the BBC for celebrity introductions and darts challenges, including The One Show and Let's Play Darts for Sport Relief.

From 2020 to 2022, Ashdown appeared on Alan Carr's Epic Gameshow in the Tony Green role as the darts scorer on Bullseye.

A Bullseye Christmas special was commissioned by ITV in 2024 with Freddie Flintoff as the host and Richard Ashdown as scorer. Flintoff and Ashdown reprise their respective roles when Bullseye returns for a full series in 2025.

Ashdown is affectionately known as "Little Richard", in reference to his height of 160 cm (5 foot 3 inches).

== Early life ==
Ashdown was born in Harlow, Essex in 1978 and moved to the Newmarket area at the age of nine. At the age of 13, Richard got involved in darts local leagues where he discovered his love for the game and played youth county darts for Cambridgeshire. Richard pursued accountancy after leaving school, until turning full-time professional in darts in 2006.

Ashdown met his wife Kathy through his work in accounts, and they married in 2005.

== Darts career ==
Ashdown met the 1994 BDO World Darts Championship runner-up, Bobby George, at a darts exhibition event at the age of 16 and, on speaking to him, George noticed Ashdown's keenness and knowledge of the maths of the game and the checkouts. Richard also worked as Bobby George's MC at his exhibitions.

The two remained friends and in 2002, George approached Ashdown about "spotting" (assisting the broadcast director with what camera to broadcast on live television) for BBC Sport when their usual employee did not turn up at the venue, and also started to use Ashdown as the regular MC for his exhibitions, where he gained much experience. Ashdown remained as spotter for the BBC and performed the role at every BDO World Championship between 2002 and 2013.

Ashdown has been a regular Master of Ceremonies for many established players and events, and made his television debut as stage referee at the 2007 International Darts League and 2007 World Darts Trophy and later the 2008 League of Legends on Setanta Sports.

Ashdown has been, and remains, the main Master of Ceremonies and referee for many darts organisations worldwide, including the England Darts Organisation since their inauguration in 2007 and at every World Darts Federation Europe Cup and World Cup from 2008 to 2019.

== PDC ==
Ashdown regularly works as part of the production team at Professional Darts Corporation televised staged events as "spotter", including all those broadcast by both Sky Sports and ITV Sport, on the World Series of Darts and the PDC European Tour.

He has also appeared as stage MC for the PDC at European Tour events and on the second stage at the UK Open and Players Championship Finals.

== BDO/WDF ==
Ashdown had not undertaken any work as MC with the British Darts Organisation prior to April 2013, who used Martin Fitzmaurice as their main MC in both open events and in both their televised events, the BDO World Darts Championship and the Winmau World Masters.

On 11 April 2013, Fitzmaurice announced that he had offered his resignation from the BDO which had been accepted, following an on-camera incident at an event in Scotland four days previously. On 20 April, the BDO announced Ashdown as his successor.

Ashdown made his first appearance on television for the BDO in October 2013 at the Winmau World Masters and hosted six Lakeside World Darts Championships (2014-2019).

He remained Master of Ceremonies and Head Referee for the BDO until resigning in July 2019, along with the other referees, Nick Rolls, Marco Meijer, Antony Dundas and Charlie Corstorphine, however, all of them remained in their roles within the World Darts Federation.

Having been Masters of Ceremonies and head referee for the World Darts Federation alongside Jacques Nieuwlaat since 2008, Richard became the WDF's Chief Development Officer in October 2019 and instigated the return of the WDF World Darts Championship to its former home of 34 years (1986 to 2019), the Lakeside Country Club in April 2022.
