= Showbiz Darts =

Televised celebrity darts tournament

- Developed by: Trans World International
- Starring: Sarah Cawood
- Country of origin: United Kingdom
- Original language: English
- No. of series: 1
- No. of episodes: 15

Production
- Running time: 30 minutes (inc. commercials)

Original release
- Network: Challenge
- Release: 2 October – 20 October 2006

Showbiz Darts is a British televised celebrity darts tournament which first aired in 2006 on the digital television channel Challenge. It was presented by Sarah Cawood, with famous darts stage host Martin Fitzmaurice, referee George Noble and commentator Tony Green. Producer of the series was Helen Kristic.

It was recorded in two sessions on 20 July 2006 at the Lakeside Country Club, home of the World Professional Darts Championship.

The celebrities who competed in the tournament were Michael Le Vell, Vicki Butler-Henderson, Roland Rivron, Holly Willoughby, Phil Tufnell, Keith Chegwin, James Hewitt and Johnny Vegas.

== Nicknames ==
In keeping with darting tradition, the celebrities were given or adopted nicknames.

- Rowland Right Here Rivron
- Johnny The Saint Vegas
- Keith Cheggers Chegwin
- Vicki The Vixen Butler-Henderson
- Phil The Cat Tufnell
- James The Galloping Major Hewitt
- Michael Spirit Le Vell
- Holly Hard to Beat Willoughby

== Format ==
The eight celebrities were split into two groups of four, each captained by top darts professionals Andy Fordham and Bobby George who trained their respective teams in preparation for the event. The darts professional trained their team members at very different venues: Andy trained his team at "The Rose", a Dartford pub that he runs with his wife, while Bobby trained his at his mansion, George Hall, near Colchester.

The four players from Fordham's group competed against each other in a round-robin format and the four players from George's group did the same. The matches consisted of one-leg where the first to reach exactly 501 wins two points. In the event that no player checked out in the time allocated for the match, then the winner was the player who achieved the highest score with 3 darts in a sudden-death shootout.

These points were recorded in each team's league table and the top two contenders in each group will then progress to the semi-finals and then the final, where the champion was awarded the Showbiz Darts 2006 trophy.

== Results and Broadcast Dates ==
Andy Fordham's Group
2 October: Rowland Rivron beat Johnny Vegas in sudden-death shootout
4 October: Keith Chegwin beat Vicki Butler-Henderson (winning dart double 7)
6 October: Vicki Butler-Henderson beat Rowland Rivron (winning dart double 6)
10 October: Johnny Vegas beat Keith Chegwin (checkout 32 – single 16, double 8)
12 October: Keith Chegwin beat Rowland Rivron (winning dart double 2)
16 October: Johnny Vegas beat Vicki Butler-Henderson (checkout 47 – single 15, double 16)
Vegas plays Chegwin in semi-final

Bobby George's Group
3 October: James Hewitt beat Phil Tufnell (winning dart double 1)
5 October: Michael Le Vell beat Holly Willoughby (winning dart double 17)
9 October: Michael Le Vell beat Phil Tufnell (winning dart double 1)
11 October: James Hewitt beat Holly Willoughby (winning dart double 1)
13 October: Phil Tufnell beat Holly Willoughby (winning dart double 4)
17 October: Michael Le Vell beat James Hewitt (checkout 23 – single 15, double 4)
Hewitt plays Le Vell in semi-final

Semi Finals
18 October Johnny Vegas beat Keith Chegwin (winning dart double 4)
19 October Michael Le Vell beat James Hewitt (winning dart double 1)

Final
20 October Michael Le Vell (Bobby George's Group) beat Johnny Vegas (Andy Fordham's Group) by 2 legs to 1.
Vegas won the first leg in 47 darts (on double 8), Le Vell the second in 53 (on double 7) and the last in 28 (on double 16).
Three Dart Averages Le Vell 35.60 Vegas 35.21

- Phil Tufnell hit 120, the highest 3-dart score of the tournament, during his defeat to Michael Le Vell broadcast on 9 October. Tufnell also managed the best leg of the group phase, with a 34 darter (average 44.21) against Holly Willoughby in his last group match. Despite these two statistics, he failed to qualify for the semi-finals.
- The highest checkout was achieved by Johnny Vegas who finished with 47 (single 15, double 16 and a dart to spare) in his last group game on 16 October.
- Holly Willoughby was the only player who failed to win a single match in the competition, Michael Le Vell managed to win all five of his matches en route to the title.

== Showbiz Darts: Extra Arrows ==
After each episode of the main programme, the celebrities featured on Showbiz Darts: Extra Arrows, a half-hour spin-off show hosted by former MTV presenter DP Fitzgerald where they discussed their game and coaching, as well as celebrity gossip. There was also a daily darts challenge between the two team captains, Bobby George and Andy Fordham.

== Viewing figures ==
The BARB audience viewing figures website reports the top 10 programmes for each multi-channel television station. It lists Showbiz Darts' sister show, Extra Arrows, as reaching the top 10 programmes on several occasions – however the main programme was broadcast at 10:30 pm, so this could possibly be mis-reporting.

- Viewing Figures where available.
  - Monday 2 October – 124,000 (1st for the week on Challenge)
  - Tuesday 3 October – 121,000 (3rd)
  - Wednesday 4 October – 86,000 (6th)
  - Thursday 5 October – 102,000 (4th)
  - Friday 6 October – 124,000 (2nd)
- 2nd week
  - Monday 9 October – 96,000 (2nd for the week on Challenge)
  - Tuesday 10 October – 96,000 (3rd)
  - Wednesday 11 October – 64,000 (8th)
  - Shows for Thursday 12 & Friday 13 October failed to reach top 10 achieving less than 61,000 viewers.
- Final week
  - Monday 16 October – 68,000 (9th for the week on Challenge)
  - Tuesday 17 October – 79,000 (5th)
  - Wednesday 18 October – 84,000 (4th)
  - Thursday 19 October – 79,000 (6th)
  - Friday 20 October (The Final) – 94,000 (2nd)
