= Bullseye (British game show) =

British darts-themed game show

- Genre: Game show
- Created by: Andrew Wood
- Presented by: Jim Bowen; Dave Spikey; Andrew Flintoff
- Starring: Tony Green; Richard Ashdown
- Country of origin: United Kingdom
- Original language: English
- No. of series: 16
- No. of episodes: 376 (inc. 11 Christmas specials)

Production
- Production locations: ATV Centre (1981–90); Television House (1990–1995); The Leeds Studios (2006); Versa Manchester Studios (2024–)
- Running time: 30/60 minutes (inc. adverts)
- Production companies: ATV (1981); Central (1982–95); Granada Yorkshire (2006); 12 Yard (2024); Potato (2025)

Original release
- Network: ITV
- Release: 28 September 1981 – 8 July 1995
- Network: Challenge
- Release: 17 April – 22 September 2006
- Network: ITV
- Release: 22 December 2024 – present

Related
- One Hundred and Eighty

Bullseye is a British darts-themed television game show created by Andrew Wood. The show is currently presented by Andrew Flintoff and scorer/referee Richard Ashdown.

The original series aired on the ITV network and was produced by ATV in 1981, then by Central from 1982 until 1995. Jim Bowen presented the show during its initial 14-year run. A revival produced by Granada Yorkshire for the Challenge TV network, hosted by Dave Spikey, aired in 2006. A Christmas special, hosted by Flintoff, aired on ITV1 on 22 December 2024, with a full series following in 2025.

The show sports an animated mascot named Bully, an anthropomorphic large brown bull who wears a red and white striped shirt and blue trousers. Bullseye attracted audiences of up to 20 million viewers at its peak.

== History ==
Bullseye was created and owned by Andrew Wood, who came up with the idea after research into aspects of game shows with mass appeal. Programme associates on the show were Mickey Brennan and Roger Edwards.

The series was centred on darts. Three teams of contestants, each consisting of one amateur darts player and one trivia/quizzing expert, competed against one another to win cash and prizes. Available items ranged from major prizes such as new cars, caravans and luxury holidays to consolation prizes that included sets of darts, tankards/goblets (for male and female contestants respectively) and "Bendy Bully" rubber dolls of the show's mascot.

The show originally aired on Monday nights in September 1981 and was produced by ATV. In 1982, Bullseye was moved to Sunday afternoons under the production of Central Television, and a new co-host, Tony Green, a professional darts referee and commentator, was brought in to keep track of the scores, at first out of vision, but in later years Green was promoted to an on-screen presence and from 1989 announced the subject scores. Nick Owen announced the contestants for the first two series of the show. During its run, viewing figures swelled to around 17 million viewers.

Bullseye was moved from Sunday afternoons to Saturday afternoons from 1993 to 1995. A 15th series was planned in 1996, however this was cancelled after Andrew Wood deemed that various changes and additions that Carlton and the ITV network centre were pressing for to update and 'modernise' the show to be unsuitable for the series and he believed it would lose its appeal as a result. At the end of its original run, Bullseye was still attracting audiences of up to 10 million viewers. After an eleven-year hiatus, Bullseye was revived for a new series, which was recorded for the digital channel Challenge. It was produced by Granada at Yorkshire Television in the Leeds Studios, and was hosted by Dave Spikey. Tony Green also returned to the show as co-host, reprising his role from the original series.

On screen, the show evolved as follows:

The first three series had the players throwing (from the point of view of the viewers and the audience) towards the right for the first round and to the left for all subsequent rounds. From the fourth series, all three boards in use rotated on a single pillar, and all throws were to the audience's right. The first four series featured opening titles of Bully jumping out of a sign and walking into a pub to play darts; this was shortened from series 2 onwards, with new theme music and musical beds from series 4. The opening credits of series 1, much longer than the version used from series 2 onwards, although containing numerous elements of what would become the show's familiar theme, feature a noticeably different arrangement of the theme tune.

From series 5, the entire set was essentially inverted. The studio audience would now be seen in shot throughout the show, and the viewers would see all darts being thrown to the left. From the studio audience's point of view, everybody continued to throw to the right. Series 5 also saw Bully driving the team bus in the opening titles and ejecting himself from the driver's seat to ride a flying dart. These titles also featured cartoon depictions of Bowen at the front of the coach, and Eric Bristow, John Lowe, Dave Whitcombe, Keith Deller, Cliff Lazarenko, Bob Anderson, Jocky Wilson and Mike Gregory at the back. This same title sequence was used for the revived series, but featuring depictions of presenter Dave Spikey at the front of the coach and professional darts players of the 2000s at the back.

A new set was introduced in the 11th series, with Bowen – who since the second series had opened the show by coming through the audience – now making his entrance through the opening that would then drop a panel behind which the star prize would be hidden. Once the show moved to Saturday afternoons, the opening titles consisted of Bully jumping out of the logo at the back of the studio and charging about to cause chaos on the set, introduced in the 13th series.

For Comic Relief in March 1993, a special crossover between Bullseye and the BBC's snooker-based game show Big Break (the creation of which had been partly influenced by Bullseye) was planned, with guest comedians as contestants, and with Bowen and Big Break host Jim Davidson, along with scorers Tony Green and Big Break's John Virgo, effectively taking their counterpart's role within the game for humorous effect. Bowen and Davidson were both very enthusiastic about the idea; however the proposal never came to fruition, reportedly after ITV wanted the rights to repeat broadcasts as a self-contained programme, to which the BBC declined.

Bowen once described Bullseye as "the second-best darts-based game-show on television". There were no others at the time.

=== John Cooper appearance ===
In 1989, John Cooper appeared on the show. He was later convicted of multiple burglaries, armed robberies, and, in 2011, following advances in forensic science, two double murders, one rape, and another sexual assault. Footage of his appearance on the show was later used by the prosecution to match him to witness reports at the time.

== Rounds ==
=== Bully's Category Board ===
A dartboard divided into 10 sectors was used, each representing a different category and further subdivided into outer, middle and inner areas. Three rounds were played, with every team receiving one turn in each and playing in the same order. On a team's turn, the darts player threw one dart and attempted to hit either the bullseye or a category chosen by their partner. Doing so awarded a cash bonus to the team and allowed the partner to answer a question in the chosen category. However, if the dart hit a different category that was still in play, no bonus was awarded and the partner had to answer a question in that category instead. Hitting a category that was out of play or failing to hit the board at all forfeited the team's turn. Questions were worth £30 each in Round 1, £50 in Round 2, and £100 in Round 3. The values on the board (working inward from the edge) were £30, £50, and £100; the bullseye awarded £200 and was always in play. Categories were removed from play after one question had been asked.

In the first series, the board values were £20, £10, and £30, working inward from the edge. The result of each throw determined the category and value of the question to be asked; no bonus was awarded for hitting the bullseye or the category chosen by the non-darts player. A bullseye allowed that contestant to select any question value and awarded £50 for a correct answer.

Starting in series 3, if the contestant in control missed the question, the first opponent to buzz-in could answer and attempt to steal the money. In early series, the opponents could silently buzz-in during the question and/or while the contestant was thinking, but were only asked for a response if the contestant missed. Later, they could only buzz-in after a miss, triggering an audible signal. If neither opponent buzzed-in, or if the first to do so also missed, the host gave the correct answer and the game continued.

For the first seven series, the lowest-scoring team was eliminated from the game after the first round. In the event of a tie for low score, the darts players for the tied teams each threw three darts at a standard matchplay board and the high scorer's team advanced. From series 8 on, all three teams continued to the next portion of the game.

Categories used during this round, in alphabetical order:

- Affairs (Series 2–14)
- Art (Series 1)
- Bible (Series 1)
- Books
- Britain (Series 2–15)
- Faces (Series 5–15)
- Food (Series 1–3)
- History
- Myths (Series 1)
- Places (Series 1–14)
- Pot Luck (Series 4)
- Science (Series 15)
- Showbiz
- Spelling
- Sport
- Words (Series 2–15)
- World (Series 15)

=== Pounds for Points ===
Each darts player threw three darts at a standard matchplay board, and the one who achieved the highest score won control of a question for their partner. Starting in series 2, an incorrect response passed the question to the team with the second-highest score, then the third if necessary; the first team to respond correctly won £1 per point scored by their darts player.

Initially, if two or more darts players achieved the same total, a re-throw was held and the high scorer won control of the question, for the value of the original throw. Later, the re-throw was eliminated and the question was played on the buzzer by the tied partners.

During the first series, the partner of the highest-scoring darts player in each round could choose to answer a question worth £25, £50, or £101. In the event of a tie, the darts players each threw one dart at a board divided into concentric circles, and the one who hit closer to the centre won control of the question.

After three questions, the team with the highest cash total from the first two games went through to play Bully's Prize Board. In the first series alone, the team who won the most money in the Pounds for Points game alone went through to Bully's Prize Board.

All three teams received their accumulated cash totals, as well as show-themed souvenirs that included darts, pens, key rings, patches, tankards (or goblets for female contestants), and "Bendy Bully" rubber dolls in the likeness of the show's mascot.

=== Charity interlude ===
At the beginning of part two, a professional darts player (or occasionally a celebrity in series 3-4 and the 2006 revival) would throw nine darts at the matchplay board. The show donated £1 per point scored to a charity of the winning team's choice, or £2 per point if the total was 301 or higher. Celebrity players often performed badly and would contribute some of their own money to the donation.

One episode of series four originally broadcast on 2 December 1984, featured comedienne Carol Lee Scott as the celebrity guest darts thrower. Bowen and Scott had known each other for many years prior after both having appeared on the same bill at various working clubs. However, as mentioned in Bowen's 1998 biography From a Bundle of Rags: Autobiography of Jim Bowen, the pair had a backstage exchange after filming of the episode, with Bowen commenting on Scott's performance which led to the pair trading several offhand comments, after which they refused to ever speak again.

==== Bronze Bully Trophy ====
During series 5 through 13 (1985 to 1994), the professional who recorded the highest score in the charity interlude over the course of an individual series won a Bronze Bully Trophy. The winners:

- 1985–86: John Lowe
- 1986–87: Lionel Smith
- 1987–88: Ray Farrell
- 1988–89: Mike Gregory
- 1989–90: Eric Bristow
- 1990–91: Bob Anderson
- 1991–92: Mandy Solomons
- 1992–93: Mike Gregory
- 1994: Kevin Painter

=== Bully's Prize Board ===
The team with the highest cash total from both rounds faced a board divided into eight pairs of alternating narrow red and wide black sectors, with a bullseye at the centre. The red sectors were numbered 1 through 8, each corresponding to a different prize, and the bullseye represented a larger item, "Bully's Special Prize." The team threw nine darts, the first and last three by the darts player and the middle three by their partner, and won the prizes for all red sectors they hit. Black sectors awarded nothing, and hitting the same red sector twice forfeited that prize—hence the show's catchphrase, "Keep out of the black and in the red, nothing in this game for two in a bed." A third hit to the same sector awarded the prize once again.

For most of the programme's original run, prize values were restricted by the Independent Broadcasting Authority, which may explain the perceived poor quality of prizes on offer. Although some prizes (such as a remote-controlled toy car or a "TV with wired remote control") were laughed at by the studio audience even then, smaller prizes were taken for granted at the time, and they seemed relatively lavish compared to those on offer in BBC game shows such as Blankety Blank. In a 2006 episode, Bully's Special Prize was a fully functional show-themed Fruit Machine.

During the first series, only the Pounds for Points scores were used to determine the winner, and the non-winning sectors were green rather than black.

=== Bully's Star Prize Gamble ===
After throwing their nine darts at Bully's Prize Board, the winning team had to decide whether to risk their prizes for a chance at "Bully's Star Prize," a large mystery prize hidden behind a screen in the studio. For the first ten series, the money they had won for themselves was not at risk; beginning with series 11, they had to put up both their money and prizes in order to play. (The team's souvenirs and the money won by the professional for their charity were never at risk.) If they chose to try for the Star Prize, they were given six darts (three per person; non-darts player throwing first) to score 101 or more on a standard matchplay dartboard. If they succeeded, they received the Star Prize and kept their previous winnings; if not, they lost all cash/prizes they had risked. When money was at stake during Bowen's tenure as host, he would tell the team that they would receive nothing except their "BFH" (bus fare home) if they lost.

If the winning team declined to play, the second-place team had the option to risk their money and try to win the prize; if this pair also declined, the third-place team was given the same choice. The actual prize was only revealed after a team had played the round, win or lose, or if all three teams chose not to play.

Bully's Star Prize was usually a holiday (especially in later series), a car, a caravan or a speedboat. Less lavish Star Prizes (fitted kitchens and the like) were sometimes given away in the early series, so as to fit within the IBA's prize limits at the time. In an episode from 1987, the Star Prize was a £2,000 fashion spree. After the prize limits were abolished in 1993, the Star Prize in Bowen's final two series would sometimes be "Bully's Treasure Chest," a cash award of £5,000.

From series 8 onwards, if the second- and third-place teams had the same total, both were asked if they wanted to gamble. If both said yes, the two darts players threw three darts each at the matchplay board and the higher score won the right to play for the Star Prize.

On the show, it was never made clear if the two winning contestants had to share the Star Prize or if they got one each.

On charity Christmas specials, in which celebrities and professional darts players teamed up to play for nominated charities, the winning team's accumulated cash total and prizes were not at risk. The cash would be doubled if they won Bully's Star Prize Gamble.

== Remakes ==
Although not strictly a remake but more of a show influenced by the original, Welsh language TV channel S4C has a darts gameshow called Oci, Oci, Oci, which uses the concept of darts and questions to win prizes. Instead of in a studio, the show is at various social clubs and pubs each week. The show has two people who handle the questions and two playing darts.

=== Ant & Dec's Gameshow Marathon ===
In 2005, it was announced that programme creator Andrew Wood had signed a contract with Granada Media for Granada to produce a one-hour long celebrity special Bullseye show to be hosted by Ant & Dec. This special was part of Ant & Dec's Gameshow Marathon, in turn part of ITV's 50th anniversary celebrations, and was aired on ITV on 22 October 2005. Vernon Kay and Coronation Street star William Roache were the contestants, accompanied by professional darts players Eric Bristow and Andy Fordham, while Tony Green reprised his role as co-host.

=== Challenge TV revival ===
Subsequently, Granada decided that a new series of Bullseye would be produced early the following year on Challenge and that the show was to be hosted by comedian Dave Spikey. Bully was also redesigned for the new series, albeit very similar to the Bully used in the original series.

The new series of Bullseye returned on Challenge in April 2006. The show maintained the style of prizes from the original, bar white goods; none of the cash prizes had increased in value since the second series in 1982, although the bullseye on the category board had decreased to £150 from the £200 of the original series. Some of the prizes from Bully's Prize Board were of more modern gameshow standard, such as a TFT television and an MP3 player. Dave Spikey and Tony Green commented on BBC Radio 1's Colin and Edith show on 19 April 2006: "...[Bullseye is] The only gameshow on the television in which the prizes get a round of applause...".

The revived series was strikingly similar to the original series. Whilst refreshed, the show maintained the original theme music and stings and used a remade version of the original's second title sequence, Bully driving the team bus. A cartoon version of Dave Spikey replaced Jim's in the titles. The Challenge revival ran for thirty episodes.

=== Vernon Kay's Gameshow Marathon ===
On 19 May 2007, another one-hour long celebrity special was aired on ITV, this time as part of Vernon Kay's Gameshow Marathon. This time the contestants were newsreader Andrea Catherwood, footballer Graeme Le Saux and another Coronation Street star, Michael Le Vell, paired with professional darts players Martin Adams, Phil Taylor and Raymond van Barneveld respectively. Once again, Tony Green reprised his co-host role. Jim Bowen did not appear on the Bullseye episode; instead, he appeared on the marathon's remake of The Golden Shot, acting as "Bowen the Bolt" (instead of "Bernie the Bolt"). At one point, he did make the comment to Kay, "Vernon, this is a bit like Bullseye used to be...throwing arrows for prizes!"

=== Alan Carr's Epic Gameshow ===
In March 2018, it was rumoured that Vernon Kay would front a reboot of Bullseye. However, he later denied that he was fronting the new reboot of Bullseye. In June 2019 it was announced that Bullseye, as one of the country's five all-time favourite game shows, was to be "supersized and rebooted" in a new series, Alan Carr's Epic Gameshow for broadcast on 4 July 2020. Commissioned by ITV, the series was filmed at dock10 studios and presented by Alan Carr.

=== ITV revival ===
A Christmas special was commissioned by ITV in 2024 with Freddie Flintoff as the host. He commented "I love the darts and Bullseye was one of my favourite shows as a kid. Can't quite believe I'll get to host this Christmas special." He added "You can't beat a bit of Bully!". Katie Rawcliffe, director of entertainment and daytime commissioning at ITV said: "Bullseye is back and we can't wait to welcome Freddie Flintoff back to ITV too. "It's a real treat to have both as key parts of our Christmas schedule on ITV1 and ITVX this year." According to ITV, the special pulled in seven million viewers and its success was followed by the commission of a full series for broadcast in 2025, hosted by Flintoff and with Richard Ashdown as the scorer and announcer.

The new series, airing from 9 November 2025, follows the same structure as the original but incorporates the following changes.

- In Bully's Category Board, the outer/middle/inner values are £50, £100, and £150, with £250 awarded for a bullseye. Questions are worth £50 in the first two rounds and £100 in the third.
- The team in last place after Pounds for Points is eliminated.
- The charity interlude, renamed "Bully's Charity Challenge," is played immediately after Pounds for Points to benefit a charity selected by the higher-scoring team. The host and a professional darts player are given three minutes to go "round the clock," hitting all 20 numbers in ascending order and finally the inner bull. Each participant throws three darts per turn, starting with the professional who must hit a double or treble to move ahead; but the host may hit any portion of the current number. The donation is equal to £100 times the highest number hit, or £5,000 for hitting all of them and the inner bull.
- The two remaining teams play a third game, "Bully's Head-to-Head." The host asks three questions alternately to each team, with numerical answers ranging from 1 to 20. The higher-scoring team blindly chooses one of two question sets, with the other put aside for their opponents, and receives the first question. The two members may confer, and the darts player is then given one chance to hit the correct number. Doing so scores one point, and the team in the lead after the last question advances to Bully's Prize Board. This game uses a Yorkshire-style board with no treble ring, and hitting a double multiples the number by two for answering purposes. (E.g. a team can register a guess of 10 by hitting either the single 10 or the double 5.) If the score is tied after three throws each, a sudden-death showdown is played, with the questions continuing in pairs until one team scores and the other does not.
- One of the prizes on Bully's Prize Board is secretly paired with a "Golden Dart," which allows the darts player one extra throw in the Star Prize Gamble (renamed "The 101 Challenge") if needed. Only the team's prizes are at risk in the latter, not their cash total.

== Merchandise ==
For the Christmas 2005 season, a Bullseye DVD game was released by board game manufacturer Upstarts. Although the game did not feature Bowen or Green, it did feature a redesigned Bully. A second DVD game titled "Classic Bullseye" was released by ITV DVD for the 2006 Christmas season, which featured both Bowen and the voice of Green, and also classic footage from the show. An updated version, "All New Bullseye", was released in 2007.

Several board games based on the show have also been released.

In the 1980s and 1990s, there were licensed videogames on the ZX Spectrum, the Acorn and the Commodore 64.

A version for the Nintendo Switch and PlayStation 4 was developed and published by Sabec, and released in June 2021.

== Episodes ==
Series overview
Series	Presenter	Scorer	Episodes	Originally released	
Series	Presenter	Scorer	Episodes	First released	Last released
ITV (1981–1995)
1	Jim Bowen	Jim Bowen	13	28 September 1981	21 December 1981
2	Jim Bowen	Tony Green	16	10 October 1982	23 January 1983
3	Jim Bowen	Tony Green	27	27 November 1983	3 June 1984
4	Jim Bowen	Tony Green	31	2 September 1984	21 April 1985
5	Jim Bowen	Tony Green	26	1 September 1985	16 March 1986
6	Jim Bowen	Tony Green	28	31 August 1986	8 March 1987
7	Jim Bowen	Tony Green	27	13 September 1987	13 March 1988
8	Jim Bowen	Tony Green	27	18 September 1988	30 April 1989
9	Jim Bowen	Tony Green	27	29 October 1989	13 May 1990
10	Jim Bowen	Tony Green	27	2 September 1990	17 March 1991
11	Jim Bowen	Tony Green	26	1 September 1991	8 March 1992
12	Jim Bowen	Tony Green	26	6 September 1992	28 February 1993
13	Jim Bowen	Tony Green	18	26 March 1994	23 July 1994
14	Jim Bowen	Tony Green	13	1 April 1995	8 July 1995
Ant & Dec's Gameshow Marathon (2005)
Gameshow Marathon Special	Ant & Dec	Tony Green	1	22 October 2005	
Challenge (2006)
15	Dave Spikey	Tony Green	30	17 April 2006	22 September 2006
Vernon Kay's Gameshow Marathon (2007)
Gameshow Marathon Special	Vernon Kay	Tony Green	1	19 May 2007	
Alan Carr's Epic Gameshow (2020–2022)
Epic Gameshow Special	Alan Carr	Richard Ashdown	5	4 July 2020	16 July 2022
ITV (2024–present)
Christmas Special	Freddie Flintoff	Richard Ashdown	1	22 December 2024	
16	Freddie Flintoff	Richard Ashdown	4	9 November 2025	30 November 2025
Christmas Special	Freddie Flintoff	Richard Ashdown	1	25 December 2025	
Soccer Aid Special	Freddie Flintoff	Richard Ashdown	1	23 May 2026	
Christmas Special	Freddie Flintoff	Richard Ashdown	1	December 2026	
17	Freddie Flintoff	Richard Ashdown	TBA	2027	TBA
