= Martin Fitzmaurice =

English darts referee

- Born: 3 June 1940; Kensington, London
- Died: 14 April 2016 (aged 75)
- Occupation: Master of ceremonies

Martin Fitzmaurice (3 June 1940 – 14 April 2016) was an English darts personality. He operated for the game's governing body in the United Kingdom, the British Darts Organisation, from 1985 to 2013, until he resigned and was replaced by Richard Ashdown in April 2013.

Fitzmaurice introduced the players after delivering his catchphrase: "Are you ready? Ladies and Gentlemen... Let's... Play.... Darts". He was affectionately known throughout the darting world as "the Fatman".

== Early life ==
Fitzmaurice was born near the Rainbow Suite in Kensington, which would coincidentally be a later venue for the Winmau World Masters. He spent all but six days of his first five years living in Wales during World War II. On returning to London he went to St Clement Danes Grammar School where he stayed on to complete his A-levels.

After school he had jobs in a solicitor's office and later worked as an electrician and also a tube train driver. He met his future wife Doreen at Queens Park Rangers football ground and they married in 1964. In spite of this connection with QPR, Fitzmaurice was a passionate supporter of Arsenal. The Fitzmaurices moved to Colchester in 1975 where he was asked to chalk a match (keep track of players' scores) in a local pub which was the start of his long career in darts.

== Early darts career ==
Shortly after refereeing a youth match in Essex, darts player Bobby George asked Fitzmaurice if he would referee for him in exhibition matches when his regular referee Freddie Williams was unavailable. The two ended up working together for around five years.

Then at the World Masters in 1985 regular caller Jack Price was taken ill, Bobby George's persistence with the BDO to use Fitzmaurice paid off and he stood in to fulfil the role.

== BDO career ==
Fitzmaurice was a chalker at the 1986 Embassy World Final, the first time the tournament had been held at the Lakeside Country Club. He was later the caller/referee and one of his biggest moments came in 1990 when Paul Lim became the first player to achieve a perfect nine-dart finish in the World Championships, the only nine-dart finish achieved at the BDO World Championship.

Fitzmaurice fulfilled the role as Master of Ceremonies at BDO tournaments for many years - introducing the players onto the stage with his catchphrase, "Let's play darts!" Fitzmaurice also served as Master of Ceremonies for the celebrity darts tournament Showbiz Darts where he tweaked his catchphrase to "Let's play Showbiz Darts".

He was also synonymous with the British Darts Organisation and made several disparaging comments about the Professional Darts Corporation. Asked in 2004 by the BBC web site whether he took any interest in the PDC World Championship he said, "None at all. There's a lot of politics that goes on, and a lot of black propaganda. All we want to do is make our system the best possible for a player."

== Racism controversy ==
In 2013 Fitzmaurice made racist and homophobic jokes whilst hosting at the BDO British Internationals at Glenrothes, Scotland. Whilst on stage, Fitzmaurice said, "A lot of wogs about these days. Take care of yourselves ladies. TEE HEE! Also, I bet that Colin Lloyd is an homo! Teef!". The BDO subsequently issued a statement saying: "The British Darts Organisation apologises unreservedly for the fact that racially offensive comments were made by MC Martin Fitzmaurice at the BDO British Internationals in Scotland on Sunday, April 7th and streamed over the internet. The BDO wishes to make it clear that it does not tolerate racism in any shape or form, and a full enquiry is already taking place into this regrettable incident." Prior to a disciplinary hearing, Fitzmaurice resigned and the BDO announced Richard Ashdown as his successor.

== Death ==
On 14 April 2016 it was announced, by the World Darts Federation, that Fitzmaurice had died. This was later confirmed by a statement by the British Darts Organisation chairman.
