= Gameshow Marathon (British game show) =

British TV game show

- Presented by: Ant & Dec; Vernon Kay
- Narrated by: Peter Dickson
- Country of origin: United Kingdom
- No. of series: 2
- No. of episodes: 15

Production
- Running time: 60–90 minutes
- Production companies: Granada and Thames (series 1); ITV Productions and Talkback Thames (series 2)

Original release
- Network: ITV
- Release: 17 September 2005 – 26 May 2007

Related
- Alan Carr's Epic Gameshow

Gameshow Marathon is a British game show broadcast on ITV from 17 September 2005 to 26 May 2007. Each of its two series had a group of celebrities who competed each week in a different classic British game show. After a quick retrospective look at the history of the particular show, the show itself is recreated. This involves recreating the original set and using original opening programme titles, including the appropriate producer ident (excluding Blankety Blank). All participants are celebrities, and any prizes won go into a "Viewer Prize Mountain" which is awarded to a viewer via a phone-in competition.

== Series 1 (2005) ==
Series 1 logo.

Ant & Dec's Gameshow Marathon is a seven-episode special event aired in 2005 on Britain's ITV Network, as part of a celebration of ITV's 50th anniversary. In it, hosts Ant & Dec presided over recreations of seven classic game shows that had been seen on the network. Six celebrity contestants competed in a series-long tournament, receiving a donation to their favourite charity for their participation. In addition, home viewers were given the opportunity to win the cash and prizes each episode's winning contestant "won" via telephone.

The programme was co-produced by Granada Productions/ITV Productions and Thames Television/Talkback Thames.

The shows recreated were:

Show	50 Years aired on ITV	Original producer(s)	Date of Gameshow Marathon appearance
The Price Is Right	1984–1988, 1995–2001	Central, Talbot Television, Fremantle, Grundy, Yorkshire	17 September 2005
Take Your Pick!	1955–1968, 1992–1998	Associated-Rediffusion, Thames, Central	24 September 2005
The Golden Shot	1967–1975	ATV	1 October 2005
Sale of the Century	1972–1983, 1997–1998	Anglia, Grundy	8 October 2005
Play Your Cards Right	1980–1987, 1994–1999, 2002–2003	LWT, Talbot Television, Fremantle, Grundy, Thames	15 October 2005
Bullseye	1981–1995, 2024	ATV, Central	22 October 2005
Family Fortunes	1980–1985, 1987–2002, 2020–present	ATV, Central, Carlton	29 October 2005

The celebrity contestants in series 1 were:

- Eamonn Holmes (TV presenter, News anchor)
- Vernon Kay (TV presenter)
- Patsy Kensit (Emmerdale actress)
- William Roache (Coronation Street actor)
- Carol Vorderman (TV presenter)
- Ruby Wax (TV presenter, comedian)

The series was run as a three-round tournament. In the first round, each show was played by every contestant who had not already won a show. The four winners from the first round then competed in single-elimination format.

Carol Vorderman was the eventual winner of the series. The Golden Shot was broadcast live like the original show, and Sale of the Century with organist Keith Beckingham and had a dedication at the end to comedian Ronnie Barker, who had died five days earlier.

Following the series, several of the shows were revived; Bullseye returned on the game show channel Challenge, followed by The Price Is Right and Family Fortunes (in a celebrity format) on ITV, the latter hosted by one of the Gameshow Marathon celebrities, Vernon Kay. (Ironically, on Kay's Family Fortunes, the Vorderman family would play the game again. They did not win on their second attempt, however.) However, Family Fortunes was brought back again in 2020 presented by Gino D'Acampo.

Les Dennis presented the prizes each week to the winners of the home viewer competition.

=== Progression ===
Round	Show	Winner	Eliminated
Round 1	The Price Is Right	Carol Vorderman	No eliminations
Round 1	Take Your Pick!	Patsy Kensit	No eliminations
Round 1	The Golden Shot	William Roache	No eliminations
Round 1	Sale of the Century	Vernon Kay	Eamonn Holmes, Ruby Wax
Semi-finals	Play Your Cards Right	Carol Vorderman	Patsy Kensit
Semi-finals	Bullseye	Vernon Kay	William Roache
Final	Family Fortunes	Carol Vorderman	Vernon Kay (runner-up)

== Series 2 (2007) ==
Series 2 logo.

Gameshow Marathon was presented by series 1 runner-up Vernon Kay. The programme aired every Saturday night on ITV from 7 April to 26 May 2007.

The shows that were played were:

Show	Years aired on ITV	Original producer(s)	Date of Gameshow Marathon appearance
The Price Is Right	1984–1988, 1995–2001, 2006–2007	**Central**, Talbot Television, Fremantle, Grundy, Yorkshire, Talkback Thames	7 April 2007
Blockbusters	1983–1993	**Central**, Talbot Television	14 April 2007
Blankety Blank	2001–2002	Grundy, Thames*	21 April 2007
The Golden Shot	1967–1975	**ATV**	28 April 2007
Name That Tune	1983–1987	**Thames**	5 May 2007
Mr. & Mrs.	1964–1988, 1999	TWW, HTV, ATV, **Border**, Action Time, Carlton	12 May 2007
Bullseye	1981–1995	ATV, **Central**	19 May 2007
Play Your Cards Right	1980–1987, 1994–1999, 2002–2003	**LWT**, Talbot Television, Fremantle, Grundy, Thames	26 May 2007

* Was previously shown on BBC One, from 1979 to 1990 and 1997 to 1999.
Bold type indicates the pre-programme ident used.

The celebrities competing in series 2 were:

- Andrea Catherwood (TV presenter, News anchor)
- Jamelia (singer)
- Graeme Le Saux (footballer)
- Michael Le Vell (Coronation Street actor)
- Wendy Richard (former EastEnders actress)
- Ben Shephard (TV presenter)

There was a slight change to the format for this series. As before, each show in the first round was played by those celebrities who have not already won a show. However, the remaining rounds were each a single show played by all celebrities still in the tournament: five in the quarter-final, three in the semi-final and two in the final.

The celebrity panellists for Blankety Blank were Andrew Castle, Fern Britton, Joe Pasquale, Holly Willoughby, Vic Reeves, and Lorraine Chase aka Steph Stokes.

The special guests on The Golden Shot were Jo Brand and Jim Bowen.

The celebrity conductor on Name That Tune was Noddy Holder. The celebrity instrument players were Antony Cotton aka Sean Tully on the tubular bells, Carley Stenson on the recorder, Adele Silva aka Kelly Windsor on the xylophone and Kelvin Fletcher aka Andy Sugden on the swanee whistle. The celebrity pianist in the Bid-a-Note round was Myleene Klass.

In Mr. and Mrs., the celebrities invited their real-life partners to play along.

On Bullseye, the celebrities were paired up with professional dart players. Andrea was paired with Martin Adams, Graeme was paired with Phil Taylor and Michael was paired with Raymond van Barneveld. Tony Green reprised his role as the scorer.

On Play Your Cards Right, each celebrity invited another celebrity to play with them. Graeme played with Kyran Bracken and Michael played with Kym Ryder.

On the Blankety Blank and Mr and Mrs editions, the more recent revivals of both series were not mentioned on Gameshow Marathon, due to Blankety Blank having been presented by Paul O'Grady (no footage of him), who was then in a legal dispute with ITV.

Following the series, three of the shows were revived; Mr. and Mrs. (in a celebrity format) on ITV in 2008, Blockbusters on Challenge in 2012 for one series and then on Comedy Central in 2019, and Blankety Blank revived as a Christmas special on ITV in 2016 with David Walliams, and then from in 2020 on BBC One as a Christmas special and subsequent series, hosted by Bradley Walsh .

Lionel Blair presented the prizes each week to the winners of the home viewer competition.

=== Progression ===
Round	Show	Winner	Eliminated
First	The Price Is Right	Graeme Le Saux	No eliminations
First	Blockbusters	Ben Shephard	No eliminations
First	Blankety Blank	Michael Le Vell	No eliminations
First	The Golden Shot	Andrea Catherwood	No eliminations
First	Name That Tune	Jamelia	Wendy Richard
Quarter-final	Mr. and Mrs.	Andrea Catherwood; Michael Le Vell; Graeme Le Saux	Jamelia; Ben Shephard
Semi-final	Bullseye	Graeme Le Saux; Michael Le Vell	Andrea Catherwood
Final	Play Your Cards Right	Michael Le Vell	Graeme Le Saux (runner-up)

== International versions ==
Country	Local name	Host(s)	Game shows recreated	Channel	Original run
France	Le marathon des jeux TV	Nagui and Pascal Sellem	Que le meilleur gagne Fa Si La Chanter; Le Juste Prix; Question pour un Champion; Une famille en or	France 2	August 2006
Germany	Gameshow-Marathon	Oliver Pocher and Oliver Petszokat	Der Preis ist heiß Geh aufs Ganze! Hopp oder Top; Glücksrad; Ruck Zuck; Bube, Dame, Hörig; Familien-Duell	ProSieben	15 January – 26 February 2007
Hungary	Születésnapi kvízmaratont tart	Attila Till	Szrencsekerek; Esti Broadway; Multi Milliomos; All az Alku	TV2	2007
Israel	Play It Big	Avri Gilad	Nuts; Family Feud; Wheel of Fortune; Squares; Play It (The Pyramid); More or Less (The Price Is Right); It's my Secret; Parallel Minds (Mastermind)	Channel 2	2010–2011
Mexico	Gameshow Marathon	Marco Antonio Regil	Atinale al Precio; 100 Mexicanos Dijeron	Televisa	2007
Portugal	Superconcurso – Jogo De Sempre	Jorge Gabriel	O Preço Certo; Entre Famílias; Palavra Puxa Palavra; Jogo de Cartas; Com a Verdade M'Enganas; Um, Dois, Três	RTP1	2007
Turkey	Yarişma Maratonu	Özgü Namal and Emre Altuğ	Kaç Para? Seç Beckalim; Şansini Dene; Yüzyilin Indirimi; Aşaği Yukari; Parola; Aileler Yarişiyor	Kanal D	2006
United States	Gameshow Marathon	Ricki Lake	The Price Is Right; Let's Make A Deal; Beat The Clock; Press Your Luck; Card Sharks; Match Game; Family Feud	CBS	31 May – 29 June 2006

In Mexico, it also has its own version of Gameshow Marathon as well, as part of Teleton's charity funds for 2007. Marco Antonio Regil hosts the marathon, which includes its versions of The Price Is Right (Atínale al Precio) and Family Fortunes (100 Mexicanos Dijeron). The show was aired on Televisa.

== See also ==
- Alan Carr's Epic Gameshow
