= ITV 50 =

Special event in September 2005, celebrating the 50th anniversary of ITV

ITV 50's logo, used between 10 September and 3 October 2005

ITV 50 was a special event around September 2005, celebrating the 50th anniversary of the ITV terrestrial television network's launch; the official anniversary was stated as being 22 September, the anniversary of the first ITV region, Associated-Rediffusion, beginning broadcasts.

Other regions, though not launched in 1955, were also involved in the celebrations, broadcasting network and local ITV 50 celebration programming. All ITV plc regions received ITV 50 presentational material including branded graphics and station idents. STV (then Scottish and Grampian) and UTV screened much of the networked ITV 50 content, using some of the ITV 50 presentation.

== Introduction ==
In September 2005, the ITV network celebrated its 50th anniversary with a season of ITV 50 programming that was run on the network, including a countdown of ITV's 50 top programmes (presented by Phillip Schofield and Cat Deeley), a special edition of Ministry of Mayhem, a World of Sport retrospective, a seven-week Gameshow Marathon (presented by Ant & Dec), the launch of an "Avenue of the Stars", and most notably, a five-part documentary series presented by Melvyn Bragg which chronicled ITV's history.

The regional companies owned by ITV plc also aired special regional retrospectives (even though none of them were themselves 50 years old), as well as using special ITV 50 station identification. While Scottish TV, Grampian TV, and UTV aired the network ITV 50 programming, they did not themselves air regional programmes of this sort, nor did they use the special identification. ITN also celebrated its 50th anniversary with special features on ITV News programming and former ITN newscasters Julia Somerville, Selina Scott, Martyn Lewis, Gordon Honeycombe and Anna Ford joining Mark Austin and Mary Nightingale to present the ITV Evening News on the week of ITN's 50th anniversary.

== Special products ==
There were a number of special products released to mark the anniversary. The Royal Mail issued special ITV 50 postage stamps. A book, ITV: The People's Channel, was published. Two CD compilations of music from ITV programmes were released.

== Associated releases ==
=== Books ===
- ITV: The People's Channel
- ITV Culture: Independent Television Over Fifty Years
- Fifty Years of ITV (Piano solo book)

=== Albums ===
- ITV 50: The Album
- ITV 50 Cult Themes

=== DVDs ===
- 50 Years of Entertaining the Nation

== See also ==
- History of ITV
- ITV plc
- List of ITV channels
- ITV (TV network)
