= Alan Carr's Epic Gameshow =

British game show

- Genre: Game show
- Presented by: Alan Carr
- Announcer: John Sachs
- Country of origin: United Kingdom
- Original language: English
- No. of series: 3
- No. of episodes: 25

Production
- Production location: dock10 studios
- Running time: 60 minutes (inc. adverts)
- Production company: Talkback

Original release
- Network: ITV
- Release: 30 May 2020 – 25 December 2022

Related
- Gameshow Marathon

Alan Carr's Epic Gameshow is a British game show which premiered 30 May 2020 on ITV. Hosted by Alan Carr, the series features reworked and "supersized" versions of past ITV game shows (primarily from the Fremantle library), with each featuring a new "epic endgame". In February 2023, it was reported that ITV had no plans for further series.

== Series overview ==
Series	Episodes	Originally released	
Series	Episodes	First released	Last released
1	7	30 May 2020	24 December 2020
2	11	3 April 2021	13 August 2022
3	7	18 June 2022	25 December 2022

== Episodes ==
=== Series 1 (2020) ===
No. overall	No. in series	Title	Original release date	U.K. viewers (millions)
1	1	"Play Your Cards Right: Celebrity Special"	30 May 2020	4.31
2	2	"The Price Is Right"	6 June 2020	4.35
3	3	"Take Your Pick"	13 June 2020	4.02
4	4	"Strike It Lucky"	20 June 2020	3.89
5	5	"Play Your Cards Right"	27 June 2020	3.57
6	6	"Bullseye"	4 July 2020	4.26
7	7	"The Price Is Right: Christmas Special"	24 December 2020	N/A

=== Series 2 (2021–2022) ===
No. overall	No. in series	Title	Original release date	U.K. viewers (millions)
8	1	"Play Your Cards Right: Celebrity Special"	3 April 2021	3.27
9	2	"Bullseye"	10 April 2021	3.35
10	3	"The Price Is Right"	17 April 2021	3.04
11	4	"Name That Tune"	24 April 2021	2.89
12	5	"Strike It Lucky"	1 May 2021	3.11
13	6	"Bullseye: Celebrity Special"	8 May 2021	3.39
14	7	"Name That Tune: Celebrity Special"	15 May 2021	3.10
15	8	"Strike It Lucky: Celebrity Special"	22 May 2021	2.34
16	9	"The Price Is Right: Christmas Special"	23 December 2021	N/A
17	10	"Play Your Cards Right"	6 August 2022	1.45
18	11	"Take Your Pick"	13 August 2022	1.51

=== Series 3 (2022) ===
No. overall	No. in series	Title	Original release date	U.K. viewers (millions)
19	1	"Play Your Cards Right: Celebrity Special"	18 June 2022	2.30
20	2	"Bullseye"	25 June 2022	2.29
21	3	"Strike It Lucky"	2 July 2022	2.28
22	4	"Child's Play"	9 July 2022	1.78
23	5	"Bullseye"	16 July 2022	1.58
24	6	"Strike It Lucky: Celebrity Special"	23 July 2022	2.10
25	7	"Child's Play: Christmas Special"	25 December 2022 (Note: This episode was original slated to air on 18 December 2022, before getting delayed due to the 2022 FIFA World Cup final going into extra time and a penalty shootout.)	N/A

== See also ==
- Ant and Dec's/Vernon Kay's Gameshow Marathon, a similar series aired to mark ITV's 50th anniversary.
