= Tony Green =

English sports commentator (1939–2024)

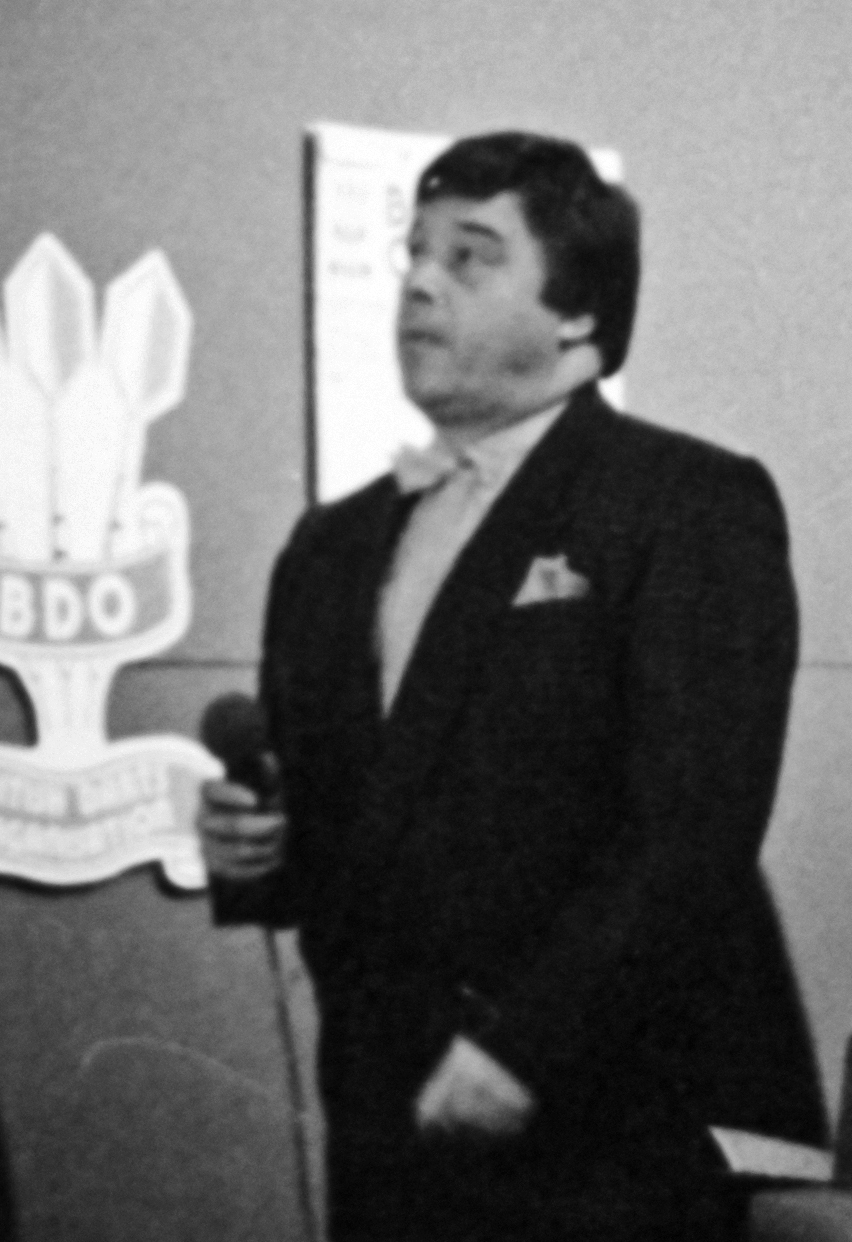
- Tony Green at the 1985 Winmau World Masters Quarterfinal
- Born: Anthony John Green; 29 January 1939; Kingston upon Hull, East Riding of Yorkshire, England
- Died: 4 March 2024 (aged 85); Huddersfield, Yorkshire, England
- Occupations: Sports commentator, television presenter
- Years active: 1978–2022
- Known for: Darts commentary and Bullseye

Anthony John Green (29 January 1939 – 4 March 2024) was an English sports commentator and television presenter, best known as the scorer and later co-host of the British TV show Bullseye, from 1982 to 1995 and again in 2006 & 2007.

Green was also the commentator for the annual BDO World Darts Championships from 1978 to 2016.

== Broadcasting career ==
Green, alongside Sid Waddell, were the darts commentators on the BBC from 1978 to 1994. Waddell left the BBC in 1994, whilst Green remained until the 2016 BDO World Darts Championships, (this being Green's final appearance), and the last one televised by the BBC. In 1990, Green was commentating during the first ever nine-dart finish at the BDO World Darts Championship. In the second round, Paul Lim netted £52,000 by hitting 180 twice, finishing with treble 20, treble 19, then double 12, to the delight of Green, commentating for the BBC.

In 2000, he appeared as himself in all six episodes on the talk show Meet Ricky Gervais broadcast on Channel 4. Green was well known as the announcer and co-host, alongside Jim Bowen, of the popular television darts quiz Bullseye, produced by Central for ITV from 1982 to 1995. In 2006, a reprised version of the show was aired, which was produced by Granada Productions for Challenge, and hosted by comedian Dave Spikey.

Green reprised his role of 'scorer' on a special edition of Bullseye, which aired as part of the Gameshow Marathon series and was broadcast on ITV on 19 May 2007. On 18 and 19 May 2007, Green co-hosted Challenge TV's coverage of the inaugural PDC US Open tournament.

In 2015, Green was narrator and commentator for the BBC's Let's Play Darts for Comic Relief.

== Illness and death ==
In 2010, Green took a career break while being successfully treated for tongue cancer.

After developing Alzheimer's disease, Green died on 4 March 2024, at the age of 85. His last ever commentary came in the 2022 Darts World Seniors Masters quarter-finals, where Phil Taylor beat Les Wallace.
