= Long-running shows =

Long-running shows can refer to:

== Lists by country ==
- List of longest-running television shows by category (international)
- List of longest-running Australian television series
- List of longest-running Indian television series
- List of longest-running Philippine television series
- List of longest-running Spanish television series
- List of longest-running British television programmes
- List of longest-running American television series
  - List of longest-running American cable television series
  - List of longest-running American primetime television series
  - List of longest-running American first-run syndicated television series
  - List of longest-running American broadcast network television series

== Theatre ==
- Long-running musical theatre productions
- Long-running plays (non-musicals)
