= List of longest-running radio programmes =

Regular broadcasts made for decades

These are the longest-running radio programmes – those which were broadcast regularly for many decades.

Pilots, special broadcasts and repeats after the continuous run are not counted in the primary statistic. Title changes are acceptable if the format and presentation is otherwise continuous.

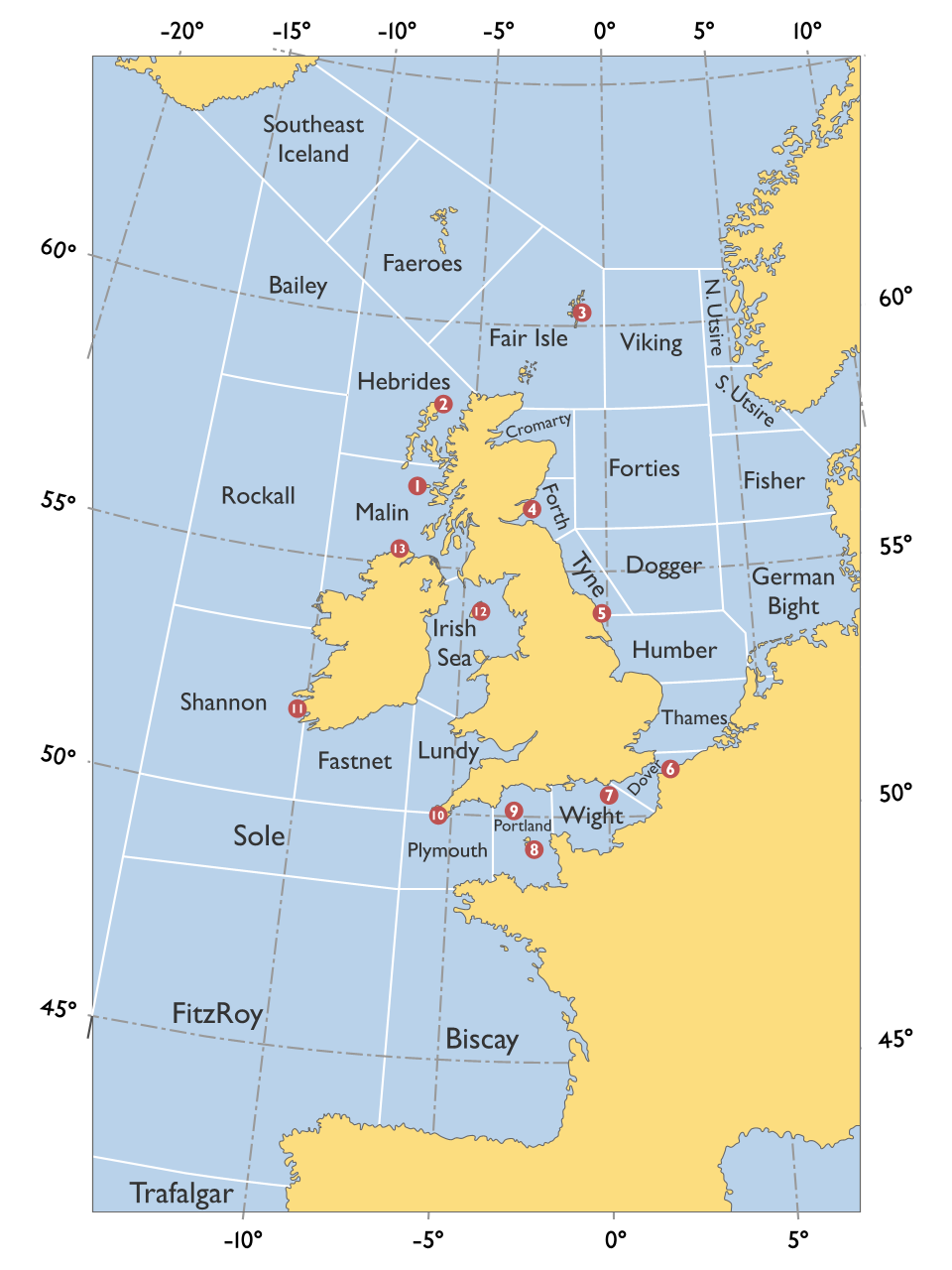
The Shipping Forecast starts with "Sailing By". The following recitation of the sea zones, which started in 1924, is now considered a traditional lullaby.

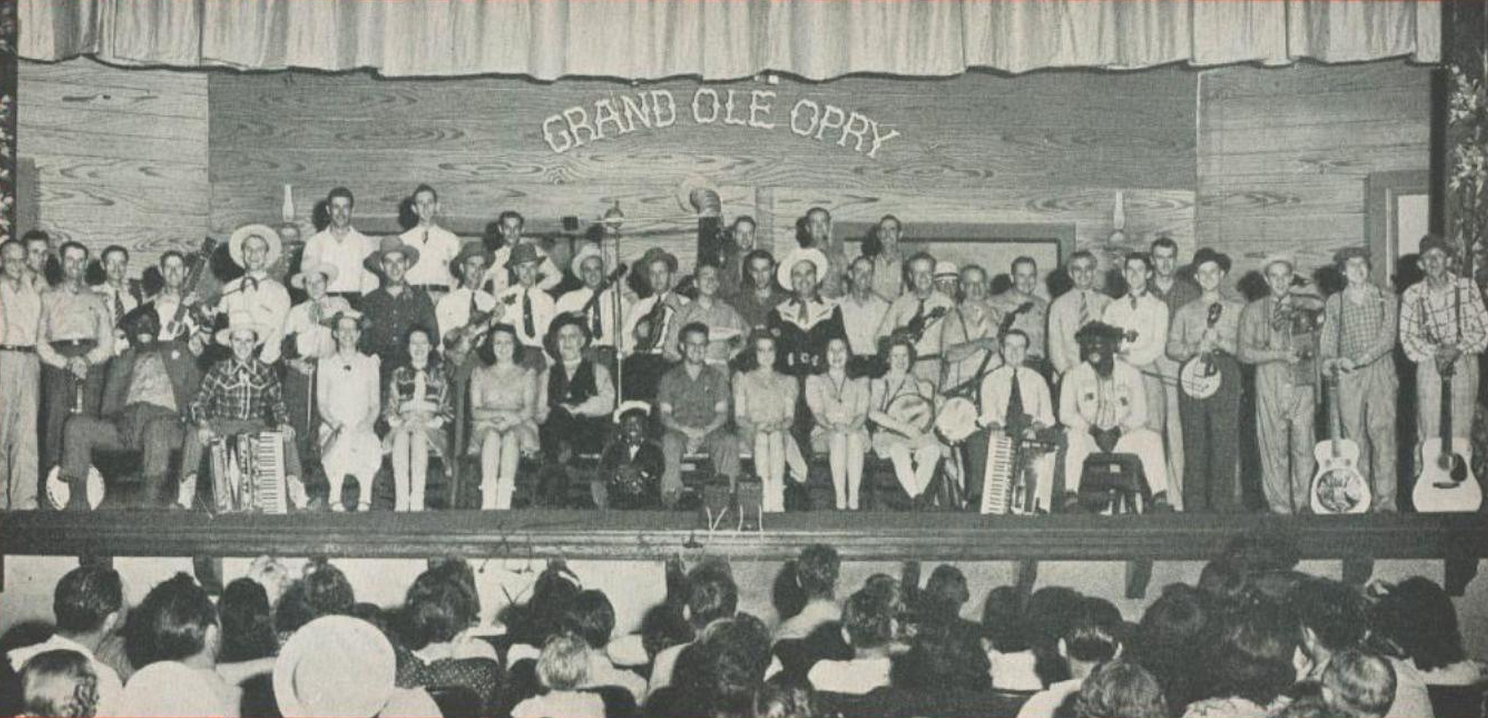
The Grand Ole Opry started its weekly broadcasts as the WSM Barn Dance on WSM in 1925. The photo shows a performance in 1944.

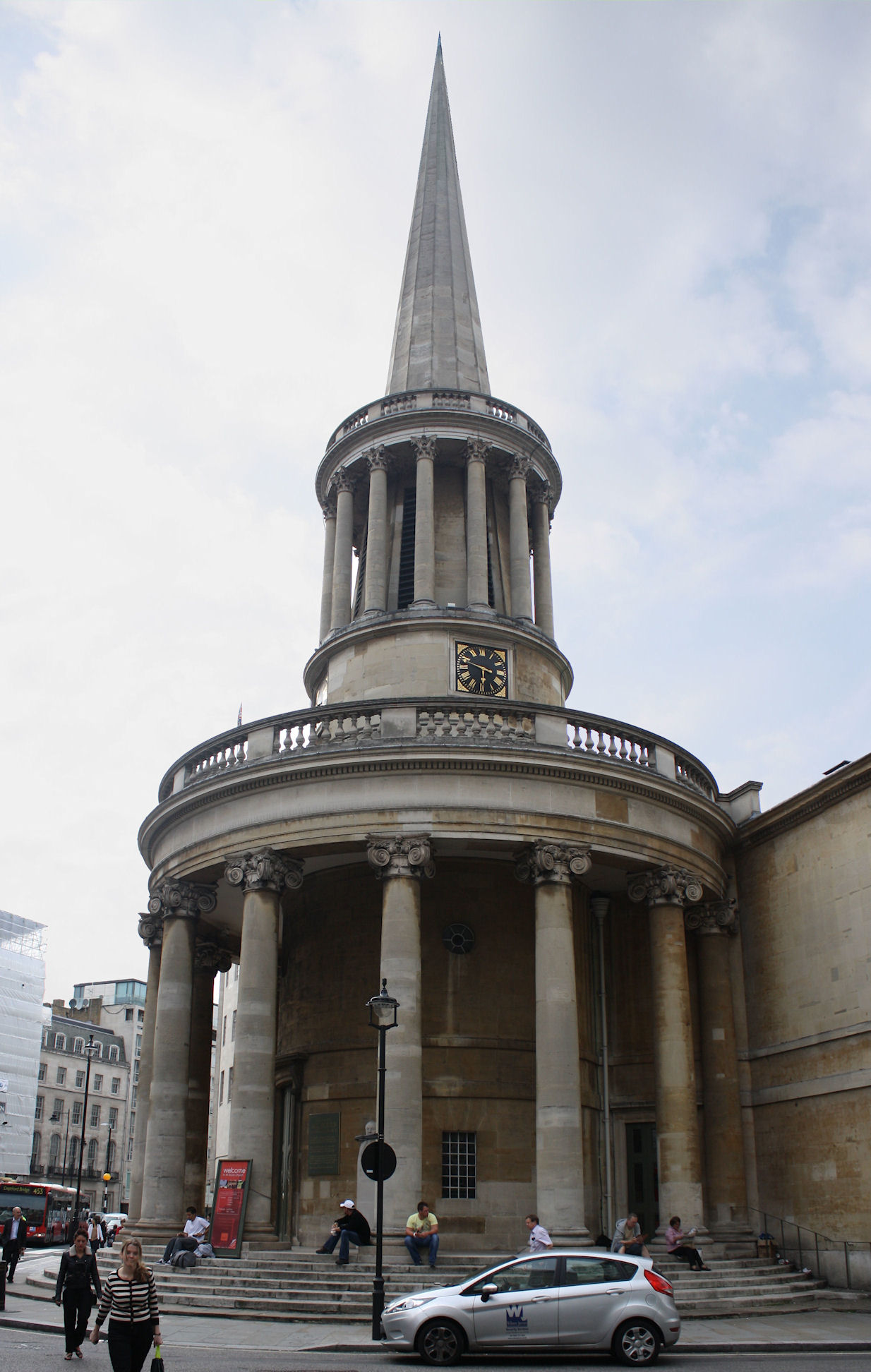
A daily church service has been broadcast by the BBC since 1928. For 43 years, this came from All Souls Church next to Broadcasting House.

== List ==
Programmes with a shaded background indicate that it is no longer in production.

Programme	Years	Longest serving years	Station	First broadcast	Last broadcast	Number of broadcasts	Genre	Notes and citations
Shipping Forecast	101	40 by Peter Jefferson	BBC	4 July 1925		over 130,000	Information (weather)	Shipping forecasts were first broadcast in 1859 by telegraph to observation stations that would then raise signal flags for ships at sea. Broadcasts over radio using Morse Code by the UK Air Ministry's radio station began in January 1924. Spoken word broadcasts began on 4 July 1925 on the BBC.
Grand Ole Opry	100	65 by Bill Anderson	WSM	28 November 1925		Over 5,000	Music (country)	Live country music
Radioavisen	100		DR	1 August 1926			News	"Radio Newspaper". Hourly news broadcast. Launched as Pressens Radioavis in 1926. Adopted its current name on 1 July 1964.
Choral Evensong	100		BBC	7 October 1926			Music (Religious/choral)	Longest running live outside broadcast programme in radio history. Generally comprising Anglican evensong, occasionally Roman Catholic vespers. Initially broadcast on BBC Home Service, later branded BBC Radio 4, until 8 April 1970 when the programme moved to BBC Radio 3.
The Daily Service	98	43 by All Souls Church, Langham Place	BBC	2 January 1928		over 33,500	Religious (Christian)	Live church sermon, bible reading, and choral music
Music & the Spoken Word	97	40 by Richard L. Evans	KSL (flagship), NBC Radio (1929-1932), CBS Radio (1932-2005), syndicated (2005-present)	15 July 1929		over 4,700	Music (religious)	The Mormon Tabernacle Choir started broadcasting occasional rehearsals on KZN in 1922 but were wary of radio's quality and the current weekly programme did not start until 1929
Voice of Prophecy	97	40 by H. M. S. Richards	syndicated	19 October 1929			Religious (Christian)	Seventh-day Adventist religious program. Previously broadcast nationally on the Mutual Broadcasting System (1942-1947), ABC Radio (1947-1956), NBC Radio Network (beginning in 1956).
Folkemusikktimen	95	26 by Rolf Myklebust (1952-1978)	NRK	7 March 1931		4,700+	Music (folk)	Weekly folk music program
Metropolitan Opera	94	44 by Milton Cross (1931-1975)	NBC Blue Network (1931-1945), ABC (1944-1958), CBS Radio (1958-1960), syndicated (1960–present); CRBC (1934–1936), CBC Radio (1936-present)	25 December 1931		1,500+	Music (opera)	Longest-running continuous classical music program in radio history
Chapter a Day	94	75 by Karl Schmidt	WPR (WHA (AM))	25 July 1932 (possibly earlier)			Books	Daily reading of books from various genres in half-hour increments. Summer program until 1939 and has been year-round since then. Some records suggest it may have first aired on WHA (AM) in the late 1920s. Carried on Wisconsin Public Radio since that network began in 1932 as Wisconsin Educational Radio.
Mahishasura Mardini	94	Birendra Krishna Bhadra, live until 1966 when a recording was made	All India Radio	11 October 1932			Religious (Hindu)	An annual religious recital of the Chandipath for Durga Puja which started in the 1930s.
The King's/Queen's Christmas Message	93	69 by Elizabeth II	BBC	25 December 1932		90	Christmas (speech)	Broadcast internationally on the BBC World Service and by various Commonwealth broadcasters. Not broadcast in 1936, 1938, and 1969.
(WWVA) Jamboree	93		WWVA to 2007; WWOV-LP since 2014	7 January 1933			Music (country)	Originally a weekly show, now limited to semi-annual specials and reruns
The Haven of Rest/Haven Today	92	37 by Paul Myers	syndicated	16 March 1934			Religious (Christian)	Christian evangelical. Called Haven Today since 2001, is a mix of music, Biblical teaching, interviews and current events. Based in California.
Make Believe Ballroom	91	29 by William B Williams	WNEW until 1992, currently on WGMC, syndicated since 1940	3 February 1935			Music (popular)	Popularized the concept of radio disc jockeys playing recorded music. Name of show was dropped in the 1970s, but restored in 1979.
The Lutheran Hour	91	33 by Oswald Hoffmann	CBS Radio (1930–1931), Mutual Broadcasting System (from 1935), ABC Radio (1949–1951), NBC Radio (1956–at least 1978), syndicated	2 October 1930/ 3 February 1935			Religious (Christian)	Christian religious programme produced by Lutheran Hour Ministries. Originally broadcast from 2 October 1930 to 11 June 1931, it resumed on 3 February 1935 and has continued since then. The programme has aired on several American radio networks, including CBS, Mutual, ABC and NBC, as well as through syndication.
A Voz do Brasil	91			22 July 1935			Information (public affairs)	National government sponsored weekly information programme. Originated as Programa Nacional, renamed A Hora do Brasil in January 1938 when it became a mandatory broadcast; known as Voz do Brasil since 1971.
Julehilsen til Grønland	91		DR	18 December 1932	17 December 2023	91	Christmas (information and music)	Christmas greeting to Greenland. Televised from 1983. In 2024, DR announced that the programme would no longer be on the holiday schedule.
Rambling with Gambling	91	34 by John B. Gambling	WOR	1925	2016		News/Talk	Hosted by three generations of hosts all named "John Gambling." Known as The John Gambling Show from 2000 to 2016 for legal reasons.
Dagens dikt	89		Sveriges Radio	1 February 1937			Literature (poetry)	Daily poetry programme in which a poem is read on Swedish radio. First broadcast on 1 February 1937, it is one of Sveriges Radio's longest-running programmes.
La Hora Nacional	89			25 July 1937			Information (public affairs)	Weekly government-sponsored cultural and information broadcast required to be aired by all Mexican radio stations.
Dagens Eko	89		Sveriges Radio	1 October 1937			News	Swedish national radio news programme, commonly known as Ekot. First broadcast by Radiotjänst on 1 October 1937, it developed into Sveriges Radio's principal national news service, with bulletins broadcast throughout the day.
CBS World News Roundup	88	25 by Dallas Townsend	CBS News Radio	13 March 1938	22 May 2026	22,900+	News	Broadcast on which Edward R. Murrow made his debut. Began as a special to report the Nazi occupation of Austria and again during the Sudetenland crisis, evolved into a daily broadcast during World War II. Ending due to closure of CBS News Radio in 2026.
Lørdagsbarnetimen	86		NRK	20 December 1924	11 September 2010		Children	A weekly children's radio program. Off the air during World War II. By the time of its final broadcast it had become the world's longest-running regular weekly radio series.
King Biscuit Time	84	67 by "Sunshine" Sonny Payne	KFFA	21 November 1941		over 17,000	Music (Blues)	Longest running daily American radio program Live Blues music.
Voci del Grigioni italiano	84		RSI	25 November 1941		4,000 approx.	Information (public affairs)	Guinness World Record: "Longest running factual weekly radio programme"
Desert Island Discs	84	43 by Roy Plomley	BBC	29 January 1942		over 3,200	Music/Talk	Interview featuring musical choices selected by the guest.
Renfro Valley Gatherin'	83		CBS Radio (1943–1957) syndicated (1957-present)	September 1943			Music (country, folk, gospel)	Features short stories, monologues, and a house band performing folk, gospel, and traditional country music.
National Research Council Time Signal	83		CBC Radio	5 November 1939	9 October 2023		Information	Aired daily marking 1 pm, Eastern Time
Back to the Bible	81	41 by Theodore Epp		1939	2020		Religious (Christian)	Has been only available as a podcast since 2020.
The Country Hour	80		ABC Radio	3 December 1945			Information (public affairs/rural)	Australia's longest running radio program. Started as a national program, currently seven separate state-based editions broadcast on all regional ABC Local Radio stations weekdays from 12pm to 1pm. Features rural and regional news, with a heavy focus on the agricultural industry.
Arbeidsvitaminen	80		NPO Radio 5	19 February 1946			Music	Music request programme
Woman's Hour	80	33 by Jenni Murray	BBC	7 October 1946			Information (women's interests/current affairs)	Daily magazine programme covering news, politics, culture, health and issues affecting women. First broadcast on the BBC Light Programme in 1946, it transferred to BBC Radio 2 in 1967 and to BBC Radio 4 in 1973.
Esportes na Onda	80		Rádio Caxias (Caxias do Sul, Brazil)	15 November 1946			Sports	Weekday sports programme of Rádio Caxias (93.5 FM) in Caxias do Sul, Rio Grande do Sul; first presented by Nestor Gollo. A 1947 edition of the local newspaper O Momento already mentions the programme. Described as the longest-running sports radio programme still broadcast on the same station.
Gardeners' Question Time	79	40 by Fred Loads	BBC	9 April 1947		over 3,500	Information (gardening)	Gardening advice programme in which a panel of experts answers questions from amateur gardeners. It was first broadcast by the BBC North Region as How Does Your Garden Grow? on 9 April 1947 and was renamed Gardeners' Question Time in 1951 when it began broadcasting nationally.
Sports Report	78	39 by James Alexander Gordon	BBC	3 January 1948			Sports	The show started listing classified football results in the early 1950s but this ceased in 2022.
Any Questions	78	32 by Jonathan Dimbleby	BBC Radio 4	12 October 1948			Information (public affairs)	The longest running live discussion programme in the UK, Any Questions?, began in the West Region on 12 October 1948. It moved to the Home Service on 13 June 1950
Midnite Jamboree	78		WSM	31 May 1947	January 2026	3,807+	Music (country)	Country music performed live. Interruptions in continuous run in 2015, 2020, and 2022.
Reith Lectures	77		BBC	26 December 1948			Information (lectures)	Annual series of radio lectures in which a prominent figure gives a series of talks on significant contemporary issues. Established in 1948 in honour of John Reith, the BBC's first director-general. The inaugural lectures were given by philosopher Bertrand Russell. The series was not broadcast in 1992.
Your Story Hour	77		syndicated	27 March 1949			Children/Religious (drama)	Children's Radio dramas based on the Bible, historical heroes, and true-to-life adventures.
The Sunday Hour	77	17 by Roger Royle	BBC	14 July 1940	28 January 2018		Religious (Christian)	Christian worship programme featuring hymns, prayers and religious discussion. Broadcast as Sunday Half Hour from 1940 until 2013, when it was expanded to an hour and renamed The Sunday Hour. It ended on BBC Radio 2 in January 2018 after more than 77 years.
Unshackled!	76		syndicated	23 September 1950		over 6,500	Religious/drama (Christian)	Religious anthology series.
The Archers	75	63 by June Spencer as Peggy Woolley	BBC	1 January 1951		over 18,740	Soap opera	Longest-running Soap opera in the world. Set in rural England.
The Fisheries Broadcast	75		CBN (CBC Radio Newfoundland)	5 March 1951			News/Information (rural)	Originally The Fisherman's Broadcast and now The Broadcast, daily "explores the stories of people in Newfoundland and Labrador who work in jobs or live in communities that depend on the sea."
Hot Air	75	30 by Bob Smith	CBC Vancouver	24 May 1947	28 January 2023		Music (jazz)	CBC Radio's longest-running programme at the time of its closure, featuring jazz from all eras. CBC confirmed that it went off air in 2023. Its eventual replacement, Vibin’, launched in January 2024.
The Baptist Bible Hour	73	70 by Elder Lasserre Bradley Jr.	WCVX, syndicated across the United States	February 2, 1953		Over 5,000	Religious (Christian)	Daily Baptist sermon and choral singing, broadcast from Cincinnati, Ohio
The Midnight Special	73	37 by Rich Warren (including 13 years as a co-host)	WFMT	23 May 1953			Music (folk)	Saturday night folk music program originally hosted by future film director Mike Nichols. Syndicated nationally since 1971.
Friday Night Is Music Night	73		BBC	25 September 1953			Music (orchestral/light music)	Live orchestral music programme featuring the BBC Concert Orchestra. It began on the BBC Light Programme in 1953, moved to BBC Radio 2 in 1967 and to BBC Radio 3 in 2024. Known as Sunday Night Is Music Night for broadcasts on Radio 2 from 2020 to 2023. No new editions were produced during part of the COVID-19 pandemic in 2020, when repeats were broadcast.
Las Dos Carátulas	73		Radio Nacional	9 July 1950	2024		Drama (radio theatre)	Argentine radio theatre programme presenting adaptations and performances of dramatic works. It began broadcasting on 9 July 1950 and was cancelled in 2024, before its 74th anniversary, because of budget constraints.
Le Masque et la plume	71	34 by Jérôme Garcin	France Inter	13 November 1955			Arts (debate)	Roundtable of professional critics devoted to the lively arts (film, literature, theater)
Folksong Festival	70	70 by Oscar Brand	WNYC	9 December 1945	24 September 2016	3,600 approx.	Music (folk)	Guinness World Record: "Longest running weekly radio programme (same host)"
Matysiakowie	69		Polskie Radio	15 December 1956			Soap opera	Weekly 25-minute kitchen sink drama.
Test Match Special	69		BBC	30 May 1957			Sports (cricket)	Ball-by-ball commentary on international cricket. The programme began on the BBC Third Programme in 1957, initially providing full ball-by-ball coverage of Test matches involving England. The first match covered was the first Test between England and the West Indies at Edgbaston.
Le Jeu des 1000 euros	68	30 by Lucien Jeunesse	France Inter	19 April 1958			Quiz	Travelling general-knowledge quiz programme created by Henri Kubnick. It began in 1958 as Cent mille francs par jour, later becoming Le Jeu des 1,000 francs before adopting its present title following the introduction of the euro.
Farming Today	66		BBC	20 September 1960			Information (public affairs/rural)	Agricultural news
The Big Broadcast	62	26 by John Hickman	WAMU	15 February 1964		3,100+ approx.	Drama (old-time radio)	The show features a collection of radio from the golden age, the 30s, 40s, and 50s.
Cross Country Checkup	61	21 by Rex Murphy	CBC Radio	16 May 1965			News/information (public affairs)	Weekly national phone-in show.
Ideas	61	20 by Paul Kennedy	CBC Radio	10 October 1965			Documentary	A nightly hour-long scholarly documentary programme.
The Happy Station Show	61	35 by Eddy Startz	PCJJ (1928-1940, 1946–47), Radio Netherlands (1947-1995)	18 November 1928	17 September 1995		Music/light entertainment	Long-running shortwave radio light entertainment programme from Holland in English and Spanish. Had an audience of as high as 100 million in the 1930s and 25 million in the 1970s. Off the air during World War II.
Night Vision	59	51 by Pastor George W. Bogle Sr.	WMUZ-FM	15 September 1967		16,500 approx.	Religious (Christian)	A live call-in broadcast for prayer. Began in 1967 as Evangel Echos, changed name to Night Vision in 2005.
Eighteenth Floor Block C	58		Commercial Radio Hong Kong	3 July 1968			Information (public affairs)	A social satire set in a local Hong Kong diner where customers discuss politics and current events.
As It Happens	58	18 by Mary Lou Finlay	CBC Radio	18 November 1968			News/information (public affairs)	A nightly 3urrent affairs newsmaker interview programme.
Moscow Mailbag	57	48 by Joe Adamov	Radio Moscow/Voice of Russia	1957	9 November 2014		Information (public affairs)	The long-running English-language Radio Moscow program answered listener letters about life, culture, and politics in the Soviet Union and later Russia. Hosted for decades by Joe Adamov until his retirement in 2005, it later continued under various hosts before being rebranded as From Moscow With Love in 2011 with Vasily Strelnikov and Natalia Stefanova. When Voice of Russia was disbanded in 2014, the show continued online on Sputnik until ending in March 2015.
Letter from America	57	57 by Alistair Cooke	BBC	24 March 1946	20 February 2004	2,869	Information (public affairs)	Longest-running speech radio programme hosted by one individual.
The World Tomorrow	56	32 by Herbert W. Armstrong	syndicated in North America, Radio Luxembourg to Europe (1953-1980s)	7 January 1934	ca. 1990		Religious (Christian)	Called Radio Church of God until 1939; continued on television until 1994. Hosted mainly by Herbert W. Armstrong (until 1958; 1978–1986) and Garner Ted Armstrong (1958–1978), with other presenters continuing English radio broadcasts until late 1989 or early 1990. Dibar Apartian's French counterpart, Le Monde à Venir (1960–ca. 2009), aired on Radio Luxembourg until the 1980s and Radio Caraïbes International. After Apartian left the Worldwide Church of God in 1995, it became affiliated with the Global Church of God, then the Living Church of God.
Quirks and Quarks	51	23 by Bob McDonald (current host)	CBC Radio	8 October 1975			Science news	Weekly magazine featuring science news, interviews, and documentaries. Previous hosts include Dr. David Suzuki (1975—1979) and Jay Ingram (1979—1991)
The Hour of Prayer	48	Rev. George W. Phillips	KGO (1924), KTAB (from 1925), later other San Francisco Bay Area stations	1924	c. 1972		Religious (Christian)	Daily religious program founded by the Rev. George W. Phillips. It began on KGO in 1924, moved to KTAB after that station was established in 1925, and subsequently aired on various San Francisco Bay Area stations until Phillips's death in 1972 or shortly thereafter.
Voice of America Jazz Hour	47–48	41 by Willis Conover	Voice of America	6 January 1955	2003	12,000+	Music (jazz)	At its height, the Voice of America Jazz Hour was listened to by up to 30 million people daily and was popular behind the Iron Curtain, despite being banned. The show continued in repeats for several months after Conover's death on May 17, 1996 and then resumed airing new programs under different hosts until 2003.
Your Hundred Best Tunes	47	44 by Alan Keith	BBC	15 November 1959	21 January 2007	2,500 approx.	Music	Popular works which were mostly classical excerpts, choral works, opera and ballads.
Hockey Night in Canada	45	40 by Foster Hewitt	CNR Radio (1931–1933), CRBC (1933–1936), CBC Radio (1936–1976)	12 November 1931	1976		Sports (ice hockey)	National radio broadcasts of National Hockey League games, originally known as the General Motors Hockey Broadcast and later the Imperial Esso Hockey Broadcast. Foster Hewitt provided play-by-play commentary. The programme adopted the Hockey Night in Canada name during the 1930s and expanded to television in 1952. Saturday-night radio broadcasts ended in 1965 and were succeeded by Sunday Night NHL Hockey, which continued until 1976.
Megawatt Mayhem	41	31 by Kevin Woron (1985–2016)	CJSW-FM (90.9 FM)	March 1985			Music (heavy metal)	Weekly heavy metal music programme broadcast from Calgary, Alberta. Founded by Kevin Woron in 1985, with Joshua Wood joining in 1999.
The Dr. Demento Show	40	40 by Barry Hansen aka Dr. Demento	KPPC-FM (1971), KMET (1972—1987), syndicated (1974—1977, 1978—2010), KACV-FM (until 2011)	January 1971	January 2011	4,000+	Music (novelty)/comedy	Show continued to be broadcast online only until October 11, 2025 when Hansen retired.

== See also ==
- Lists of longest-running shows internationally:
  - List of longest-running television shows by category
  - List of longest-running Australian television series
  - List of longest-running Indian television series
  - List of longest-running Philippine television series
  - List of longest-running Spanish television series
  - List of longest-running UK television programmes
- Lists of longest-running U.S. shows by broadcast type:
  - List of longest-running U.S. broadcast network television series
  - List of longest-running U.S. cable television series
  - List of longest-running U.S. first-run syndicated television series
  - List of longest-running U.S. primetime television series
