= List of television programs by episode count =

Audiovisual broadcasts by narrative units

The following is a list of television programs by episode count. Episode numbers for ongoing daytime dramas are drawn from the websites for the shows. Daily news broadcasts, such as The Today Show, Good Morning America, and SportsCenter, are not episodic in nature and are not listed.

== List ==
This is a list of television programs by episode count with 2,500 episodes minimum.

Program	Genre	Country of origin	Seasons	Episode count	Started broadcasting	Finished broadcasting
Unser Sandmännchen	Animated	East Germany	61	22,200+	November 22, 1959	Currently in production
Minuto de Dios	Religious	Colombia	—N/a	17,000+	January 10, 1957	Currently in production
Krishi Darshan	Agriculture	India	62	16,780	January 26, 1967	Currently in production
CBS Evening News	News program	United States	72	16,400+	July 1, 1941	Currently in production
General Hospital	Soap opera	United States	62	15,766	April 1, 1963	Currently in production
Guiding Light	Soap opera	United States	57	15,762	June 30, 1952	September 18, 2009
Days of Our Lives	Soap opera	United States	60	15,000	November 8, 1965	Currently in production
Eat Bulaga!	Variety show	Philippines	47	14,580+	July 30, 1979	Currently in production
A Chat with Glendora	Talk show	United States	1	14,569	1972	Currently in production
As the World Turns	Soap opera	United States	54	13,858	April 2, 1956	September 17, 2010
The Young and the Restless	Soap opera	United States	51	13,000	March 26, 1973	Currently in production
Tetsuko's Room	Talk show	Japan	—N/a	12,100	February 2, 1976	Currently in production
Des chiffres et des lettres	Game show	France	52	12,000+ (Note: Estimation is based on the show's frequency, which was every two weeks, then every week until 1970. In 1972, it was broadcast every five days in the week and according to the show's website is still following this format to this day, putting the estimate of the number of episodes around 12,000.)	September 19, 1965	August 25, 2024
Aktuelle Kamera	News show	East Germany	—N/a	12,000+	December 21, 1952	December 31, 1991
100 Huntley Street	Daily talk	Canada	77	12,000+	June 15, 1977	Currently in production
Access Hollywood	Entertainment news	United States	28	11,844	September 6, 1996	Currently in production
Coronation Street	Soap opera	United Kingdom	60	11,746	December 9, 1960	Currently in production
One Life to Live	Soap opera	United States	44	11,136	July 15, 1968	January 13, 2012
All My Children	Soap opera	United States	42	10,755	January 5, 1970	September 23, 2011
Emmerdale	Soap opera	United Kingdom	53	10,602	October 16, 1972	Currently in production
Barátok közt	Soap opera	Hungary	23	10,456	October 26, 1998	July 17, 2021
The Price Is Right	Game show	United States	54	10,071	September 4, 1972	Currently in production
AM Plaza	Daily talk	South Korea	—N/a	10,012	May 20, 1991	Currently in production
TV Slagalica	Game show	Serbia	203	10,003	November 22, 1993	Currently in production
Sandmännchen	Animated	West Germany	30	~10,000	December 1, 1959	March 31, 1989
The Bold and the Beautiful	Soap opera	United States	40	9,903	March 23, 1987	Currently in production
Neighbours	Soap opera	Australia	40	9,235	March 18, 1985	December 11, 2025
Search for Tomorrow	Soap opera	United States	35	9,130	September 3, 1951	December 26, 1986
Jeopardy! (1984 version)	Game show	United States	40	9,000	September 10, 1984	Currently in production
Another World	Soap opera	United States	35	8,891	May 4, 1964	June 25, 1999
Home and Away	Soap opera	Australia	39	8,819	January 17, 1988	Currently in production
Munshi	Social & political satire	India	1	8,808	September 1, 2000	Currently in production
Countdown	Game show	United Kingdom	92	8,708	November 2, 1982	Currently in production
Gute Zeiten, schlechte Zeiten	Soap opera	Germany	35	8,700	May 11, 1992	Currently in production
Arul Neeram	Astrological show	India	1	8,522	February 11, 2001	Currently in production
Hometown Report	Agriculture	South Korea	—N/a	8,401	May 20, 1991	Currently in production
Shortland Street	Soap opera	New Zealand	32	8,339	May 25, 1992	Currently in production
Waratte Iitomo! (笑っていいとも!)	Variety show Talk show	Japan	31	8,054	October 4, 1982	March 31, 2014
Pobol y Cwm	Soap opera	United Kingdom	46	8,000	October 16, 1974	Currently in production
Wheel of Fortune (1983 syndicated version)	Game show	United States	41	8,000	September 19, 1983	Currently in production
Unter uns	Soap opera	Germany	32	8,000	November 28, 1994	Currently in production
Striscia la notizia	Entertainment	Italy	37	7,965	November 7, 1988	Currently in production
Les Guignols	Political satire Puppet show	France	30	7,500 (Note: Estimation based on the show's frequency which was 5 days a week)	August 29, 1988	June 22, 2018
Bom Dia & Companhia	Children's	Brazil	28	7,480	August 2, 1993	April 1, 2022
The Edge of Night	Soap opera	United States	28	7,420	April 2, 1956	December 28, 1984
Tritiyo Matra	Talk show	Bangladesh	1	7,322	July 7, 2003	Currently in production
Love of Life	Soap opera	United States	29	7,315	September 24, 1951	February 1, 1980
Saber y ganar	Game show	Spain	39	7,194	February 17, 1997	Currently in production
Familie	Soap opera	Belgium	32	7,100	December 30, 1991	Currently in production
Un posto al sole	Soap opera	Italy	31	7,080	October 21, 1996	Currently in production
Goede tijden, slechte tijden	Soap opera	Netherlands	35	7,027	October 1, 1990	Currently in production
EastEnders	Soap opera	United Kingdom	38	6,973	February 19, 1985	Currently in production
Play School (UK)	Children's	United Kingdom	—N/a	6,866	April 21, 1964	September 12, 1988
Enjoy Yourself Tonight (歡樂今宵)	Variety show	British Hong Kong	—N/a	6,613	November 20, 1967	October 7, 1994
Dom-2	Reality	Russia	17	6,400	May 11, 2004	Currently in production
Judge Judy	Reality	United States	25	6,280	September 16, 1996	July 23, 2021
Malhação	Soap opera	Brazil	27	6,203	April 24, 1995	April 3, 2020
Larry King Live	Talk show	United States	20	6,120	June 3, 1985	December 16, 2010
Blokken	Game show	Belgium	27	6,094	September 5, 1994	Currently in production
Captain Kangaroo	Children's	United States	29	6,090	October 3, 1955	December 8, 1984
Hollyoaks	Soap opera	United Kingdom	25	6,050	October 23, 1995	Currently in production
Rasoi Show	Cookery show	India	16	6,000	October 25, 2004	Currently in production
The View	Talk show	United States	28	6,000	August 11, 1997	Currently in production
L'eredità	Game show	Italy	20	5,673	July 29, 2002	Currently in production
Lingo	Game show	Netherlands	32	5,665	January 5, 1989	Currently in production
Thuis	Soap opera	Belgium	29	5,535	December 23, 1995	Currently in production
7de Laan	Soap opera	South Africa	25	5,529	April 4, 2000	December 26, 2023
Le Juste Prix	Game show	France	17	5,425	December 13, 1987	April 10, 2015
Isidingo	Soap opera	South Africa	22	5,414	July 7, 1998	March 12, 2020
Blue Peter	Children's	United Kingdom	62	5,294	October 16, 1958	Currently in production
The Secret Storm	Soap opera	United States	20	5,195	February 1, 1954	February 8, 1974
Alles was zählt	Soap opera	Germany	17	5,188	March 15, 2006	Currently in production
Bobino	Children's	Canada	28	5,170	May 23, 1957	June 14, 1985
Fair City	Soap opera	Ireland	35	5,170	September 1989	Currently in production
Yeh Rishta Kya Kehlata Hai	Soap opera	India	1	5,157	January 12, 2009	Currently in production
The Doctors	Soap opera	United States	19	5,155	April 1, 1963	December 31, 1982
Wheel of Fortune	Game show	Australia	26	5,118	July 21, 1981	June 27, 2008
Jaka to melodia?	Game show	Poland	25	5,025	September 4, 1997	Currently in production
Match of the Day	Sports	United Kingdom	51	5,000	August 22, 1964	Currently in production
Salatut elämät	Soap opera Drama	Finland	28	5,049	January 25, 1999	Currently in production
The Jerry Springer Show	Tabloid talk show	United States	27	4,969	September 30, 1991	July 26, 2018
Ulice	Soap opera	Czech Republic	20	4,863	September 5, 2005	Currently in production
Taarak Mehta Ka Ooltah Chashmah	Sitcom	India	1	4,860	July 28, 2008	Currently in production
The Merv Griffin Show	Talk show	United States	23	4,855	October 6, 1962	June 6, 1986
Crossroads	Soap opera	United Kingdom	26	4,830	November 2, 1964	May 30, 2003
Sesamstraat	Children's	Netherlands; Belgium	41	4,800	January 4, 1976	2019
The Mike Douglas Show	Talk show	United States	21	4,747	December 11, 1961	November 30, 1981
Sesame Street	Children's	United States	56	4,744	November 10, 1969	Currently in production
Egoli: Place of Gold	Soap opera	South Africa	18	4,706	April 6, 1992	March 31, 2010
Sturm der Liebe	Soap opera	Germany	23	4,687	September 26, 2005	Currently in production
Plus belle la vie	Soap opera	France	18	4,665	August 30, 2004	November 18, 2022
Verbotene Liebe	Soap opera	Germany	20	4,664	January 2, 1995	June 26, 2015
Sale of the Century	Game show	Australia	22	4,610	July 14, 1980	November 29, 2001
The Oprah Winfrey Show	Talk show	United States	25	4,561	September 8, 1986	May 25, 2011
Pyramid	Game show	United States	39	4,532	March 26, 1973	January 10, 2013
The Project	Current affairs News; Entertainment	Australia	17	4,504	July 20, 2009	June 27, 2025
It's Showtime	Variety show	Philippines	11	4,500+	October 24, 2009	Currently in production
Doctors	Soap opera	United Kingdom	24	4,496	March 26, 2000	Currently in production
The One Show	News magazine	United Kingdom	1	4,408	April 14, 2006	Currently in production
Tinsel	Soap opera	Nigeria	19	4,400	September 7, 2008	Currently in production
Kang's Family	Soap opera	China	22	4,300	August 30, 2000	Currently in production
Jóban Rosszban	Soap opera	Hungary	17	4,287	January 23, 2005	April 14, 2022
Rote Rosen	Soap opera	Germany	24	4265+	November 6, 2006	Currently in production
Late Show with David Letterman	Talk show Variety show	United States	22	4,261	August 30, 1993	May 20, 2015
Binnelanders	Soap opera	South Africa	15	4,250+	October 15, 2005	Currently in production
Generations	Soap opera	South Africa	13	4,246	1994	May 20, 2013
Klan	Soap opera	Poland	26	4,232	September 22, 1997	Currently in production
Olimayamana Ethirkaalam	Astrological show	India	1	4,232	December 9, 2009	Currently in production
The Daily Show	Comedy	United States	18	4,214	July 22, 1996	Currently in production
Slavi's Show	Talk show Variety show Comedy	Bulgaria	19	4,176	November 27, 2000	July 31, 2019
Marienhof	Soap opera	Germany	18	4,053	October 1, 1992	June 15, 2011
O Preço Certo	Game show	Portugal	3	4,000	September 17, 1990	Currently in production
Abhishekam	Soap opera	India	12	4,000	December 22, 2008	February 1, 2022
Padres e Hijos	Soap opera	Colombia	17	3,880	March 15, 1993	August 21, 2009
Na Wspólnej	Soap opera	Poland	21	3,727	January 23, 2003	Currently in production
Goenkale	Soap opera	Spain	26	3,707	October 3, 1994	December 28, 2015
Pierwsza miłość	Soap opera	Poland	19	3,700	November 4, 2004	Currently in production
Het Klokhuis	Educational	Netherlands	43	3,690	January 3, 1988	Currently in production
Jackanory	Children's	United Kingdom	30	3,640	December 13, 1965	March 24, 1996
Lykkehjulet	Game show	Denmark	23	3,559	October 1, 1988	December 31, 2001
Tukang Ojek Pengkolan	Soap opera	Indonesia	1	3,522	April 25, 2015	March 17, 2023
Ryan's Hope	Soap opera	United States	13	3,515	July 7, 1975	January 13, 1989
La ruota della fortuna	Game show	Italy	15	3,501	October 19, 1987	June 19, 2009
OK, il prezzo è giusto!	Game show	Italy	21	3,466	December 21, 1983	April 13, 2001
Lampsi	Soap opera Drama	Greece	14	3,457	September 16, 1991	July 29, 2005
Savdhaan India	Procedural drama	India	73	3,374	April 23, 2012	May 25, 2024
Trace	Crime drama	Russia	19	3,353	September 3, 2007	Currently in production
Scandal!	Soap opera	South Africa	13	3,335	September 8, 2005	Currently in production
Muvhango	Soap opera	South Africa	13	3,330	April 7, 1997	Currently in production
Aadade Aadharam	Soap opera	India	12	3,329	January 26, 2009	March 14, 2020
Family Feud	Game show	United States	22	3,304	July 12, 1976	Currently in production
Susana Giménez	Talk show	Argentina	26	3,250	June 1, 1987	December 15, 2019
Good Morning Australia	Talk show Variety show	Australia	14	3,213	January 20, 1992	December 16, 2005
Kumkum Bhagya	Romantic drama	India	4	3,208	April 15, 2014	September 21, 2025
Pleasant Goat and Big Big Wolf	Animated	China	45	3,207 (Note: As July 2026, Pleasant Goat and Big Big Wolf has released a total of 45 seasons comprising 3,207 episodes (45 mainline seasons with 2,528 episodes, 12 online short dramas with 679 episodes).)	August 3, 2005	Currently in production
Hotel Cæsar	Soap opera	Norway	34	3,123	October 24, 1998	December 14, 2017
3000 Whys of Blue Cat	Animated	China	9	3,057	October 8, 1999	Currently in production
The Friendly Giant	Children's	United States; Canada	—N/a	3,000	September 30, 1958	March 1985
Los Venegas	Sitcom	Chile	21	3,000+	May 1, 1989	June 27, 2011
Just for Laughs Gags	Reality	Canada	25	3,000+	December 26, 2000	Currently in production
Brookside	Soap opera	United Kingdom	—N/a	2,915	November 2, 1982	November 2, 2003
Sazae-san	Anime	Japan	—N/a	2,853 (Note: Each weekly airing of Sazae-san consists of three separate episodes. The episode count includes specials.)	October 5, 1969	Currently in production
Bhabiji Ghar Par Hain!	Sitcom	India	2	2,834	March 2, 2015	April 17, 2026
Fruit Pie (水果冰激凌)	Children's	Taiwan	34	2,820	July 2, 1998	Currently in production
TV Donghwa Haengbokhan Sesang (TV 동화 행복한 세상)	Animated	South Korea	—N/a	2,809	April 30, 2001	May 10, 2012
Le Bébête Show	Political satire	France	—N/a	2,800	August 10, 1982	1995
Late Night with Conan O'Brien	Variety show	United States	14	2,725	September 13, 1993	February 20, 2009
Il pranzo è servito	Game show	Italy	11	2,721	September 13, 1982	June 26, 1993
Play School (Australia)	Children's	Australia	59	2,670	July 18, 1966	Currently in production
Nintama Rantarō	Anime	Japan	34	2,668 (Note: There are 25 "series" which are part of the overall Nintama Rantarō series. This page lists all the episode titles.)	April 10, 1993	Currently in production
Radio Rochela	Sketch Comedy	Spain	51	2,652 (Note: The program aired weekly (Mondays) for 51 years. The 52 weeks were multiplied by 51 (years), less the days that RCTV was off the air (by closures in the early eighties, the fire headquarters in 1961 and 1978 and non-renewal of its concession in 2007 for 49 days). The accounts were added the days when RCTV aired on cable TV.)	September 16, 1959	April 5, 2010
Morangos com Açúcar	Soap opera	Portugal	9	2,642	August 30, 2003	September 15, 2012
Bis	Game show	Italy	9	2,600	October 5, 1981	June 29, 1990
Cheez TV	Children's	Australia	11	2,547	July 17, 1995	August 20, 2005
Man bijt Hond	Newsmagazine; Comedy	Netherlands	—N/a	2,500+	1999	October 2, 2015

== See also ==
- List of longest-running television shows by category
- List of longest-running U.S. cable television series
- List of most watched television broadcasts
- List of longest-running U.S. primetime television series
- List of longest-running U.S. first-run syndicated television series
- Lists of television programs by episode count
- List of longest-running radio programmes
