= Lists of television programs by episode count =

The following are lists of television programs by episode count.

- List of television programs by episode count
- List of animated television series by episode count
  - List of anime series by episode count
  - List of anime franchises by episode count

== Related pages ==
- List of highest-grossing films based on television series
