= List of sitcoms broadcast in first-run syndication =

Throughout the mid-to-late 1980s into the early 1990s, sitcoms continued to enter first-run syndication after being canceled by the networks, the most successful of which were Mama's Family and Charles In Charge. Other sitcoms during this time to enter first-run syndication after network cancellation included Silver Spoons, Punky Brewster, Webster, It's a Living, Too Close for Comfort, 9 to 5, What's Happening!! (retitled as What's Happening Now!!), and WKRP in Cincinnati (as The New WKRP in Cincinnati). Many of these sitcoms produced new shows in syndication mainly to have enough episodes for a profitable run in rerun syndication. Other sitcoms, such as Small Wonder, Out of This World, The Munsters Today, and Harry and the Hendersons (as well as more action-adventure oriented series including Superboy and My Secret Identity) enjoyed success in syndication throughout the entire run.

== 0–9 ==
- 9 to 5 – After ABC cancelled it five episodes into the 1983–84 season, new episodes of 9 to 5 resurfaced in first-run syndication in late 1986. Valerie Curtin was back as Judy Bernly as was Rachel Dennison as Doralee Rhodes. Assuming the starring role, in place of the unavailable Rita Moreno (Violet Newstead), was Sally Struthers as slightly naive single mother Marsha McMurray Shrimpton, who added fresh perspective to the group. For the second time in the TV series, the company that the lead characters worked for changed again, this time to Barkley Foods International. In the syndicated version, Franklin Hart was history; the girls' superiors were ladies' man Russ Merman (Peter Evans), Bud Coleman (Edward Winter), and Marsha's boss in the 1986–87 season, Charmin Cunningham (Dorian Lopinto). The following season, Vice President of Sales E. Nelson Felb (Fred Applegate) became Marsha's boss. The series enjoyed a revival in popularity, and with its additional seasons in first-run syndication, 9 to 5 became eligible for rerun syndication.

== A ==
- The Abbott and Costello Show – The show was not a network program when first introduced but was sold into syndication by MCA Inc. to about 40 local stations across the country. As a result, it was broadcast on different days and at different times in different cities. In New York, it first appeared on the CBS affiliate, WCBS, on December 5, 1952 but was not carried nationally on that network. (The 1953–54 season was telecast locally on WNBT, as NBC's New York flagship station was then known). However, first season episodes were repeated as part of CBS' Saturday morning schedule during the 1954–55 season.
- All That Glitters – All That Glitters debuted the week of April 18, 1977 on about 40 stations in late-night syndication. After initially capturing 20% of viewers in major markets in its opening weeks, All That Glitters eventually lost about half of that audience mid-way through its run. The series was cancelled after 13 weeks, last airing on July 15, 1977.

== B ==
- The Baxters – Unlike most other sitcoms, each episode was open-ended, the first half of each episode being a vignette featuring the Baxter family and presenting a situation or dilemma they faced, and the second half, an "instant analysis" talk-show format, giving a live studio audience and guests a chance to talk about the topic being presented. Stations carrying the show could choose between producing their own discussion segments locally, or presenting a national version of the segment which, during its first season, was produced in Los Angeles, and in its second season, Toronto. The discussion moderator in the second segment was different in each city, and in some local markets, viewers were invited to call in and voice their reactions.
- Boogies Diner – Boogies Diner (also known as Boogie's Diner) is a syndicated Canadian sitcom which first aired in 1994. It stars Jim J. Bullock, Monika Schnarre, and James Marsden in one of his first appearances on television. The series ended in 1995.
- Bustin' Loose – Bustin' Loose is an American sitcom that was loosely based on the 1981 film of the same name starring Richard Pryor. The series premiered in first-run syndication in 1987 and lasted for only one season.

== C ==
- Charles in Charge – It was first broadcast on CBS from October 3, 1984 to April 3, 1985, when it was cancelled due to a struggle in the Nielsen ratings. It then had a more successful first-run syndication run from January 3, 1987 to November 10, 1990. 126 original episodes were aired in total. The show was produced by Al Burton Productions and Scholastic Productions in association with Universal Television. When the show ended its run on CBS, and entered first-run syndication in 1987, the story explained that the Pembrokes sub-leased their house and moved to Seattle, and the Powells moved in instead, thereby allowing Charles to live downstairs yet again. This time, the family consisted of grandfather Walter, mother Ellen (whose husband was in the Navy, and consequently could only visit his family sporadically), and her three children, Jamie, Sarah, and Adam.
- Check It Out! – Check it Out! is a Canadian television sitcom, which aired on CTV from September 1985 to April 1988. The series also aired in the United States in syndication and on the USA Network.
- Colonel Humphrey Flack – Colonel Humphrey Flack was an early American television series that ran from October 7, 1953 to July 2, 1954 on the DuMont Television Network, then revived from 1958 to 1959 for first-run syndication. When the series was revived in 1958, it was retitled Colonel Flack.

== D ==
- D.C. Follies – It was syndicated in many markets, although it often aired at odd hours (7:30 p.m. in Los Angeles, but 1:30 a.m. in Washington, D.C.), making it difficult for the show to build a following.
- Dusty's Trail – Dusty's Trail is an American Western/comedy series that aired in syndication from September 1973 to March 1974.

== F ==
- The First Family – The First Family is an American sitcom that debuted in first-run syndication in the United States on September 22, 2012. Created by Byron Allen and produced by Allen's production company Entertainment Studios, the series (along with Mr. Box Office, which debuted the same weekend and is also produced by Entertainment Studios) is the first situation comedy to air in first-run syndication since the 2000 cancellation of Malibu, CA. The First Family is primarily syndicated to stations affiliated with The CW and MyNetworkTV and to independent stations for broadcast in weekend primetime timeslots. The series will produce a total of 104 episodes, borrowing a similarly-formatted episode order as several sitcoms produced and distributed by Debmar-Mercury, such as Tyler Perry's House of Payne and Anger Management (though the aforementioned Debmar-Mercury produced programs operated under a syndication model where the programs were sold to cable networks with an initial ten-episode order, and obtained an additional order of at least 90 episodes if the series was successful). The series, which was sold as part of a two-hour comedy block with Mr. Box Office, was initially picked up by stations owned by Tribune Broadcasting, Weigel Broadcasting and CBS Television Stations; by May 2012, the program had been sold to stations in markets covering approximately 85% of the United States.

== H ==
- Harry and the Hendersons – Harry and the Hendersons is an American sitcom based on the film of the same name, produced by Amblin Entertainment for Universal Television. The series aired in syndication from January 13, 1991 to June 18, 1993, with 72 half-hour episodes produced. The series is about a family who adopt a Bigfoot called Harry.
- Hey, Jeannie! – Twenty-six segments aired on CBS from September 8, 1956 to May 4, 1957 in the Saturday slot following The Gale Storm Show and preceding the western series Gunsmoke. Six additional episodes aired in 1958 in syndication.
- Honey, I Shrunk the Kids: The TV Show (hour long) – It debuted in first-run syndication on September 27, 1997 and ran for three consecutive seasons, concluding with the 66th episode on May 20, 2000. The show was cancelled due to Disney's unwritten policy of not producing shows with more than 65 episodes, even though it had one more episode.
- How to Marry a Millionaire – How to Marry a Millionaire is an American sitcom that aired in syndication from September 1957 to August 1959.

== I ==
- Isabel's Honeymoon Hotel – In January 1987, The Jeffersons star Isabel Sanford starred in her own sitcom Isabel's Honeymoon Hotel, which aired five days a week in syndication. The series was created to showcase Sanford's comedic skills, but it failed to attract an audience and was quickly cancelled.
- It's a Living – While the show was never a hit on network TV, its fortunes would later turn around in 1983, when all 27 episodes went to syndication. The series began to attract a following along with surprising ratings for the reruns, which prompted the producers and Golden West Television to bring the series back. Another factor in its sudden rediscovery was Ann Jillian's public disclosure that she had been diagnosed with breast cancer in 1984, the same year as the announcement to bring the show back. In 1985, the show was revived under its old name - the title changed to Making a Living in its second network season - for the syndicated market. Most of the cast remained intact from the former version. A new waitress, Amy Tompkins (Crystal Bernard), arrived at the restaurant and was immediately accepted by the group. When Jillian decided to leave the show in 1986 (she had agreed to do only one season in syndication, plus she wanted to continue her treatments for breast cancer), she was replaced by Ginger St. James (Sheryl Lee Ralph). With these core cast members in place, the show continued to produce episodes for syndication until it ended in 1989.

== L ==
- Learning the Ropes – Learning the Ropes is a Canadian-produced sitcom that aired on CTV in Canada and in syndication in the United States from September 1988 to March 1989. The series stars Lyle Alzado as Robert Randall, a teacher who works as a professional wrestler in the evening. Although his children knew about Randall's double life, the family was forced to keep it secret at school. The series featured guest appearances by many members of the National Wrestling Alliance (NWA).
- Life with Elizabeth – The low-budget comedy was produced by and filmed at a local Los Angeles TV station where Betty White and Del Moore were on the staff (the series was originally a live production on KLAC-TV in 1952).

== M ==
- Mack & Myer for Hire – Since each episode was approximately 12 minutes long, it was usually shown as part of a longer program. This was common at the time, as many stations across the United States would have shows, often hosted by clowns, which consisted of the Mack & Myer, Clutch Cargo and The Three Stooges shorts, combined with station-produced host segments.
- Madame's Place – Madame's Place aired for one first-run season from September 20, 1982 until February 25, 1983, although the actual number of episodes produced is disputed (some references say 150, some say 75). The show was unusual for a sitcom in that it was produced for first-run syndication to air five days a week.
- Malibu, CA – Malibu, CA is an American teen sitcom television program produced by Saved by the Bell creator Peter Engel that aired from 1998 to 2000 on syndication.
- Mama's Family – After Mama’s Family was cancelled by NBC in 1984, it moved to first-run syndication in 1986. Major cast changes occurred during the convert, with only Vicki Lawrence (Thelma), Ken Berry (Vinton), and Dorothy Lyman (Naomi) returning as regulars from the NBC run. The syndication years saw far less bickering than the NBC years and particularly The Family sketches. The Naomi and Vinton characters became far less serious and more dimwitted, and Mama was represented as more of the leader of the family throughout the show's syndication years.
- Marblehead Manor – This show was part of NBC's much-hyped "prime time begins at 7:30" campaign, in which the network's owned-and-operated stations would run first-run sitcoms in the 7:30-8 pm time slot to counterprogram competing stations' game shows, sitcom reruns and other offerings. The experiment turned out to be a largely unsuccessful one, as only one of the series was a hit while three of the other four were canceled after their only season and one other lasted two seasons before its cancellation. Marblehead Manor was one of the three that failed to make it to a second season.
- Mary Hartman, Mary Hartman – During the run of the series and its various spin-offs and sequels, KTTV, which broadcast the series in the Los Angeles market, also broadcast a tongue-in-cheek version of its nightly "Metronews" newscast, titled "Metronews, Metronews."
- Mr. Box Office – Mr. Box Office is primarily syndicated to stations affiliated with The CW and MyNetworkTV and to independent stations for broadcast in weekend primetime timeslots. The series will produce a total of 104 episodes, borrowing a similarly-formatted episode order as several sitcoms produced and distributed by Debmar-Mercury, such as Tyler Perry's House of Payne and Anger Management (though the aforementioned Debmar-Mercury produced programs operated under a syndication model were the programs were sold to cable networks with an initial ten-episode order, and obtained an additional order of at least 90 episodes if the series was successful). The series, which was sold as part of a two-hour comedy block with The First Family, was initially picked up by stations owned by Tribune Broadcasting, Weigel Broadcasting and CBS Television Stations; by May 2012, the program had been sold to stations covering approximately 85% of all U.S. markets.
- Mister Ed – Mister Ed first aired in syndication from January 5 to July 2, 1961 and then on CBS from October 1, 1961 to February 6, 1966.
- The Munsters Today – The Munsters Today broadcast 72 episodes from October 8, 1988 to May 25, 1991 (it had more first run episodes than the original series). The pilot explained the 22-year gap following the original series by showing the family as they were in 1966 when an accident took place; the family then proceeds to wake up in 1988.
- My Secret Identity – Originally broadcast from October 9, 1988 to May 25, 1991 on CTV in Canada, the series also aired in syndication in the United States.
- My Talk Show – The series was inspired in some ways by Fernwood 2 Night, which was set in the fictional town of Fernwood, Ohio, and also used the same premise involving midwestern American television programming but it also had some elements borrowed from SCTV as well, since some of the cast members were also Canadian. But the concept (the home doubling as a studio and other elements) was actually borrowed from another program, Tea With Michael Raye, a local cable access program that ran from 1985 to 2010 in the Los Angeles area. Raye was approached at first by the producers to bring his program to syndication, but the producers decided to go in a different direction instead, after the deal fell through. However, the series had trouble in attracting viewers due to the stations that aired it in late nights (especially in later hours among network affiliated stations), resulting in MCA ending production on the show by December 1990. Michael Patrick King, who later created 2 Broke Girls, was among the writers for the series, while Colin Mochrie (Debra McGrath's husband) did recurring appearances in several episodes.

== N ==
- The New Gidget – The New Gidget is an American television sitcom that aired in syndication from 1986 to 1988. The series was produced by original Gidget series producer Harry Ackerman and was launched after the television movie Gidget's Summer Reunion starring Caryn Richman as Gidget aired in 1985. Richman would go on to reprise the role of Gidget in the series.
- New Monkees – Originally slated for a 22-episode season, the show earned ratings lower than expected, and New Monkees left the air after thirteen episodes.
- The New WKRP in Cincinnati – Nine years after the original WKRP in Cincinnati aired on CBS, the series returned to the air in first-run syndication from 1991–1993. The syndicated series, contrary to the belief of some, was not canceled due to large monetary losses. Despite the challenges of syndication, which included varying airtimes (sometimes late at night) in various markets, the series was able to operate in the black, but not producing a profit substantial enough to investors backing it financially.

== O ==
- One Big Family (1986–87), a Danny Thomas sitcom produced by Witt/Thomas Productions and distributed by Lorimar-Telepictures. Danny plays Jake Hatton, a retired comedian in Seattle, who helps raise his nieces and nephews following the deaths of their parents.
- Out of the Blue – Teen sitcom that aired 1995–96 starring Brooke Burns and Paulo Benedeti, among others.
- Out of This World – During its first season, the series was originally part of NBC's much-hyped "prime time begins at 7:30" campaign, in which the network's owned-and-operated stations would run first-run sitcoms in the 7:30-8 pm time slot to counterprogram competing stations' game shows, sitcom reruns and other offerings. Out of This World was rotated with the original series Marblehead Manor and She's the Sheriff, a syndicated revival of the 1983 sitcom We Got It Made, and a television adaptation of the play You Can't Take It With You. NBC ended the experiment after the 1987–88 season due to the low ratings put up by three of the series, with Out of This World being one of the two that was renewed. After its first season the series was largely moved to weekend time slots, where it remained until its cancellation following the fourth season.
- Ozzie's Girls – Ozzie's Girls is an American sitcom spin-off of The Adventures of Ozzie and Harriet, which ran in first-run syndication during the 1973–74 season.

== P ==
- Punky Brewster – While the show was in production throughout the 1986–87 season, it did not return to the air via first-run syndication until October 30, 1987. Beginning on that premiere date, Punky was packaged such that new episodes would air once every weekday (usually late in the afternoon on local stations). The entire third season (1986–87) aired in the five-days-a-week format through December 7, 1987. The following Monday, reruns of the third season took over on weekdays, while the episodes shot during the 1987–88 season were completing. On April 27, 1988, new episodes resumed for the fourth season, and ran every weekday for exactly a month until the series finale aired on Friday, May 27, 1988. NBC could not co-produce the episodes due to then-existing FCC regulations regarding network involvement in syndicated TV programming. Thus, they made a syndication deal with Coca-Cola Telecommunications to co-produce two more seasons of episodes, plus U.S. syndication rights to the NBC-era episodes. Although Coca-Cola held onto the deal during the next two seasons of Punky Brewster, production was moved over to Columbia in the second syndicated season, whereupon they became a co-producer with Coca-Cola.

== S ==
- The Sabrina the Teenage Witch Show (animated)
- She's the Sheriff – She's the Sheriff was part of NBC's much-hyped "prime time begins at 7:30" campaign, in which the network's owned-and-operated stations would run first-run sitcoms in the 7:30-8 pm time slot to counterprogram competing stations' game shows, sitcom reruns and other offerings. This experiment was short lived, however, and although She's the Sheriff was renewed for a second season, it was moved to a weekend timeslot.
- Silver Spoons – Silver Spoons aired on NBC from September 25, 1982 to May 11, 1986 and in first-run syndication from September 15, 1986 to March 4, 1987. The series was produced by Embassy Television for the first four seasons, until Embassy Communications moved the series to syndication.
- Small Wonder – Although the show was created under Metromedia Productions, the rights to the show were acquired by 20th Century Fox Television in 1986.
- Starting from Scratch – Close to Home is based on creator Brian Cooke's U.S. sitcom Starting from Scratch. While living and working in the United States, Cooke developed the idea for Starting from Scratch, and a single season, comprising 23 episodes, was made and aired in the U.S. between 1 October 1988 and 27 May 1989. With production of Starting from Scratch underway, Cooke returned to the UK to oversee the creation of Close to Home, which was produced by the ITV London weekend franchise holder London Weekend Television, in association with the U.S. distributor Worldvision Enterprises.

== T ==
- Throb – The show was produced by Procter & Gamble Productions in association with Taft Entertainment Television, and was distributed by Worldvision Enterprises. The series' rights are currently held by CBS Television Distribution.
- Too Close for Comfort – During the early 1980s, TV station owner Metromedia was expanding its portfolio of original syndicated programming through its production subsidiary, Metromedia Producers Corporation. Its efforts would eventually lead to the creation of the Fox Broadcasting Company. When Too Close for Comfort was canceled by ABC, Metromedia Producers Corporation elected to pick up the series and began producing all-new episodes to run on various stations throughout the country. Starting in April 1984, a total of 14 new episodes were broadcast for the show's fourth season, featuring the same cast as seen on the ABC episodes. The show's ratings improved in syndication, and Metromedia ordered an additional 30 episodes, airing through November 1985. With a total of 107 episodes of Too Close for Comfort having been produced, the show became a popular staple for syndicated reruns throughout the late 1980s.
- Tyler Perry's House of Payne – The sitcom ran in first-run syndication for 10 episodes during the summer of 2006 on the broadcast version of WTBS, along with nine other broadcast outlets across the country, as a limited run, with additional episodes to be available for national distribution on TBS in June 2007.

== W ==
- Wait Till Your Father Gets Home (animated) – Wait Till Your Father Gets Home was an animated sitcom produced by Hanna-Barbera that aired in first-run syndication in the United States from 1972 to 1974 (airing on most NBC stations on Sunday nights at 10:30, except for the ones whom had moved their late-night news to that slot). The show was the first primetime animated sitcom to run for more than a single season since The Flintstones more than 10 years earlier and would be the only one until The Simpsons 15 years later.
- Webster – Over the course of the fourth season, ratings dropped sharply. The show, which had been a Nielsen top 30 series, ranked 46th by the end of the season. ABC chose not to renew Webster. The series' popularity and interest among younger viewers prompted Webster to continue in first-run syndication starting in fall of 1987. Early in the 1988–89 season, with Emmanuel Lewis clearly outgrowing the title role, Alex Karras and Susan Clark also decided that the time was right to move on. The last episode was taped in early 1989 (but aired that March), which did not signify an end of any sort, but was played out as a high event – the cast went on a space adventure with guest star Michael Dorn as Lt. Worf, from Star Trek: The Next Generation (in the episode, "Webtrek").
- We Got It Made – We Got It Made was revived in first-run syndication for the 1987–1988 season as part of NBC's much-hyped "prime time begins at 7:30" campaign, in which the network's owned-and-operated stations would run first-run sitcoms in the 7:30-8 pm time slot to counterprogram competing stations' game shows, sitcom reruns and other offerings. Teri Copley and Tom Villard were the only returning cast members, Jay and Beth no longer were a couple (Bonnie Urseth had decided not to participate this time), and David was now played by John Hillner. David, Jay and Mickey had new neighbors as well – policeman Max Papavasiolios Sr. (Ron Karabatsos) and his son, Max Jr. (Lance Wilson-White).
- What a Country! – What a Country! is an American sitcom that aired in syndication from September 27, 1986 to May 23, 1987.
- What a Dummy – What a Dummy is a syndicated television sitcom that lasted for one season in 1990.
- What's Happening Now!! – The original What's Happening!! was a modest success in its 1976–1978 network run on ABC, despite some serious production problems. But repeats of the show's 65 episodes did reasonably well in syndication. In some markets, the show was perceived to appeal to both children and adults in a similar way that The Brady Bunch and Happy Days did. The show was often aired in transitional hours where stations would go from the cartoons to the evening sitcoms. In a few markets the show actually had far higher ratings in syndication than during the network run. With this in mind, a revival of the show was produced entitled What's Happening Now!!. It ran from 1985 to 1988 in first-run syndication.

== Y ==
- You Can't Take It with You – A situation comedy based on the play, featuring Harry Morgan as Grandpa, ran in the United States during the 1987–1988 season.
