= Joe Adamov =

Russian journalist (1920–2005)

- Ջո Ադամով; Джо Адамов
- Adamov in a Radio Moscow staff meeting
- Born: Yosif Amayakovich Adamov; January 7, 1920; Batumi, Georgia
- Died: 18 December 2005 (aged 85); Moscow, Russia
- Education: Moscow State Pedagogical University
- Occupations: Journalist, presenter

Yosif Amayakovich Adamov (Armenian: Իոսիֆ Համայակի Ադամով; Russian: Иосиф Амаякович Адамов; 7 January 1920 – 18 December 2005), known as Joe Adamov (Armenian: Ջո Ադամով; Russian: Джо Адамов), was a journalist and presenter on Radio Moscow and its successor, the Voice of Russia, for over sixty years.

== Biography ==
Of Armenian descent, he was born in Batumi, Georgia. As a child, he lived with his family in England and attended British schools. Later, in the 1930s, he attended a special school for American expats in Moscow where he acquired familiarity with Americans. He was a graduate of Moscow State Pedagogical University.

An expert English-speaker who spoke with a neutral American accent, Adamov joined Radio Moscow as an announcer at the foreign language service of Radio Moscow in 1942. He lived in Moscow during most of his career.

Among English-speaking listeners, he is best known as the presenter of the programme Moscow Mailbag on Radio Moscow's North American shortwave broadcasts. The program answered questions from listeners on all aspects of Soviet life and the USSR's policies. At its height, Moscow Mailbag listeners sent Adamov thousands of letters yearly. In his capacity as a Radio Moscow journalist and presenter of Moscow Mailbag, Adamov conducted interviews with many western politicians and journalists, including Dwight D. Eisenhower, Eleanor Roosevelt, Walter Cronkite, and Larry King.

During the Cold War, Adamov's broadcasts, like all other Radio Moscow output, were carefully studied by Western governments, a fact of which the Soviet authorities were well aware. Joe Adamov presented Moscow Mailbag from 1957 until shortly before his death, when ill-health forced him to relinquish the role permanently. The program remained on the air with different presenters.

Joe Adamov was also the official Soviet translator at the trial of Gary Powers, shot down in a U-2 spy plane in 1960.

The signature poem of Moscow Mailbag was:

You can't do better
than send us that letter
and in it tell Joe
what you think of his show

Adamov's death was reported on Voice of Russia's English-language news bulletins on December 21, 2005, although neither these bulletins nor the obituary on their website gave an exact date of death.
