= List of longest-running television shows by category =

Audiovisual broadcasts by duration and content

This lists the longest-running television shows by category. The criterion for the longest-running show is the number of years the show has been on the air, and not the number of episodes produced.

| Years | Category | Show name | Country | Duration | Channel/network | No. of episodes |
|---|---|---|---|---|---|---|
| 89 | Sports outside broadcast | The Championships, Wimbledon | United Kingdom | 1937, 1939,1946–present (not played during World War II, nor in 2020 due to COVID-19 concerns) | BBC Television Service, BBC One/Two | |
| 88 | Outside broadcast | Lord Mayor's Show | United Kingdom | 1937–1938, 1946–present (not broadcast during WW2 1939–1945) | BBC Television Service, BBC One | |
| 88 | Outside broadcast | Remembrance Sunday: The Cenotaph | United Kingdom | 1937–1938, 1946–present (not broadcast during WW2, 1939–1945) | BBC Television Service, BBC One | |
| 78 | News show | Meet the Press | United States | 1947–present | NBC | 4,946+ |
| 78 | Newscast | CBS Evening News | United States | 1948–present | CBS | 16,400+ |
| 77 | Religious program | Le Jour du Seigneur | France | 1949–present | TF1 (1949–87); France 2 (since 1987) | |
| 76 | Religious program | Music & the Spoken Word | United States | 1949–present | KSL (Television since 1949, radio since 1929) | 3,900+ |
| 73 | Sports show | Hockey Night in Canada | Canada | 1952 (Note: Originated on radio in 1931 as the General Motors Hockey Broadcast and then the Imperial Oil Hockey Broadcast. Became known as Hockey Night in Canada around 1936 when it moved to the newly created CBC Radio.)–present | CBC (since 1952), City/Sportsnet (2014–2026), CTV (1965–1975) | |
| 73 | Music talent show | NHK Nodo Jiman | Japan | 1953–present | NHK | 2,900 (as of 2012) |
| 72 | Sports magazine show | La Domenica Sportiva | Italy | 1953–present | RAI | 3,318 (as of 10 May 2020) |
| 72 | Current affairs series | Panorama | United Kingdom | 1953–present | BBC One | |
| 72 | Talk show | The Tonight Show | United States | 1954–present | NBC | |
| 70 | Annual live international beauty pageant | Miss Universe | United States | 1955–present | CBS, NBC, FOX | 72 |
| 70 | Song contest | Sanremo Music Festival | Italy | 1955–present | RAI (radio broadcast since 1951, TV broadcast since 1955) | |
| 70 | Annual live national beauty pageant | Miss America | United States | 1955–present | ABC, NBC, CBS | 96 (102) |
| 70 | Annual live song contest | Eurovision Song Contest | Europe | 1956–2019, 2021-present | EBU | 104 |
| 69 | Science show | The Sky at Night | United Kingdom | 1957–present | BBC One, BBC Four | 825 (as of Oct 2022) |
| 67 | Children's show | Blue Peter | United Kingdom | 1958–present | BBC One, CBBC | 5,294 (as of 13 October 2023) |
| 67 | Agriculture information | Plodovi zemlje | Croatia | 1958–present | HRT 1 | 1,900 (as of 14 March 2017) |
| 66 | Animated | Sandmännchen | Germany | 1959–present | Deutscher Fernsehfunk, Rundfunk Berlin-Brandenburg | 22,200+ |
| 65 | Soap opera | Coronation Street | United Kingdom | 1960–present | ITV | 10,000+ |
| 65 | Documentary | Four Corners | Australia | 1961–present | Australian Broadcasting Corporation | |
| 65 | TV feedback show | Points of View | United Kingdom | 1961–present | BBC One, BBC Two | |
| 65 | Quiz show | It's Academic | United States | 1961–present | | |
| 64 | Comedy | KVN | Soviet Union (1961–1991); Russia (1991–present) | 1961–present | Channel One Russia, KVN TV | |
| 63 | Medicine talk show | Trupi dhe Shëndeti | Albania | 1962–present | RTSH | 1,000+ |
| 63 | Variety show | Programa Silvio Santos | Brazil | 1963–present | SBT | 3,000+ |
| 62 | Science fiction | Doctor Who | United Kingdom | 1963–1989, 1996, 2005–present | BBC One | 892 (as of 31 May 2025) |
| 62 | Music chart show | Top of the Pops | United Kingdom | 1964–2006; Christmas shows only 2006–present | BBC One, BBC Two | 2,219 |
| 61 | Nature documentary | Le Jardin extraordinaire | Belgium | 1965–present | RTBF | 2,400+ |
| 60 | Agricultural programme | Country Calendar | New Zealand | 1966- present | TVNZ | 1,500+ |
| 60 | Children's stories | Vecernicek | Czech Republic | 1965–Present | Czech Television Programs: ČT1, ČT2, ČT Déčko | |
| 59 | Children's show (preschool) | Play School | Australia | 1966–present | Australian Broadcasting Corporation (ABC) | 4,500+ |
| 59 | Comedy special | Áramótaskaupið | Iceland | 1966–present | Ríkisútvarpið | 56 |
| 58 | Game show | Des chiffres et des lettres | France | 1965–2024 | France 2 (1965–2006); France 3 (2006–2024) | 20,000 (as of October 2012) |
| 56 | Anime | Sazae-san | Japan | 1969–present | Fuji Television | 8,880+ |
| 55 | Police procedural | Tatort | Germany | 1970–present | Das Erste | 1,340 (as of 24 September 2026) |
| 55 | Superhero fiction | Kamen Rider | Japan | 1971–1989, 2000–present | MBS/NET (1971–1975), MBS/TBS (1975–1989), TV Asahi (2000–) | 1,649 |
| 54 | Sketch comedy show | Sábados Felices | Colombia | 1972–present | Caracol Televisión | 2,600+ as of 8 October 2022 |
| 50 | Political satire | Extra 3 | Germany | 1976–present | Das Erste | |
| 49 | Talk show - hosted continuously by the same host | Tetsuko's Room | Japan | 1976–present | TV Asahi | 12,100 (as of 12 September 2023) |
| 48 | Charity show | The Jerry Lewis MDA Labor Day Telethon | United States | 1966–2014 | Various | 48 |
| 48 | Sports variety | Grandstand | United Kingdom | 1958–2007 | BBC One, BBC Two | 3,500 |
| 47 | Film review | Film | United Kingdom | 1971–2018 | BBC One | |
| 47 | Noontime Variety show | Eat Bulaga! | Philippines | 1979–present | RPN (1979-89), ABS-CBN (1989-95), GMA (1995-2024), TV5 (since 2024) | 14,500+ (and counting) |
| 47 | Reality show | Antiques Roadshow | United Kingdom | 1979–present | BBC One | 866+ |
| 41 | Glove puppetry show | Pili | Taiwan | 1984–present | Pili TV | 2,000+ |
| 40 | Medical drama | Casualty | United Kingdom | 1986 –present | BBC | 1,401 |
| 39 | Comedy drama | Kopi kade | Sri Lanka | 1987–present | ITN | 2,000+ |
| 38 | Music video show | Rage | Australia | 1987–present | Australian Broadcasting Corporation | |
| 36 | Adult animation | The Simpsons | United States | 1989–present | Fox Broadcasting Company | 850+ |
| 36 | Television magazine | Ityadi | Bangladesh | 1989–present | Bangladesh Television | 400+ |

== See also ==
- List of longest-running radio programmes
- List of longest-running American television series
- List of longest-running British television programmes
- List of longest-running Indian television series
- List of longest-running Australian television series
- List of longest-running Philippine television series
- List of longest-running Spanish television series
- List of longest-running American cable television series
- List of longest-running American primetime television series
- List of longest-running American first-run syndicated television series
- List of television series canceled after one episode
- List of television programs by episode count
