= List of longest-running American broadcast network television series =

This is a list of the longest-running American broadcast network television series, ordered by the number of broadcast seasons.

To qualify for this list, the programming must originate in North America, be shown on a United States national (not regional) television network, and be first-run (as opposed to a repackaging of previously aired material or material released in other media). For this list, series that were available only on a local or regional basis are excluded. The "number of seasons" total does not include cable broadcasts or series in syndication.

== Over 60 years ==
Series shaded in light blue are currently in production.

Length	Number of seasons	Series	Network	First broadcast	Last broadcast	Number of episodes	Notes
79 years	77	Meet the Press (NBC News)	NBC	November 6, 1947	present	4,946+	Longest-running show.
78 years	72	CBS Evening News (CBS News)	CBS	May 3, 1948	present	16,400+	Longest-running network newscast.
74 years	69	Hallmark Hall of Fame	NBC	December 24, 1951	December 17, 1978	260	Not broadcast on a regular schedule, with only a limited number of productions per year.
74 years	69	Hallmark Hall of Fame	CBS	November 14, 1979	April 30, 1980	260	Not broadcast on a regular schedule, with only a limited number of productions per year.
74 years	69	Hallmark Hall of Fame	PBS	February 9, 1981	May 6, 1981	260	Not broadcast on a regular schedule, with only a limited number of productions per year.
74 years	69	Hallmark Hall of Fame	CBS	December 1, 1981	January 29, 1989	260	Not broadcast on a regular schedule, with only a limited number of productions per year.
74 years	69	Hallmark Hall of Fame	ABC	April 30, 1989	April 23, 1995	260	Not broadcast on a regular schedule, with only a limited number of productions per year.
74 years	69	Hallmark Hall of Fame	CBS	December 10, 1995	April 13, 2011	260	Not broadcast on a regular schedule, with only a limited number of productions per year.
74 years	69	Hallmark Hall of Fame	ABC	November 27, 2011	April 20, 2014	260	Not broadcast on a regular schedule, with only a limited number of productions per year.
74 years	69	Hallmark Hall of Fame	Hallmark Channel	November 30, 2014	present	260	Not broadcast on a regular schedule, with only a limited number of productions per year.
74 years	74	Today (NBC News)	NBC	January 14, 1952	present	27,000+	
73 years	73	ABC World News Tonight (ABC News)	ABC	October 12, 1953	present	15,722+	
72 years	72	The Tonight Show	NBC	September 27, 1954	present	13,359	
72 years	58	The Wonderful World of Disney	ABC	October 27, 1954	June 11, 1961	1,224	
72 years	58	The Wonderful World of Disney	NBC	September 24, 1961	August 16, 1981	1,224	
72 years	58	The Wonderful World of Disney	CBS	September 26, 1981	September 24, 1983	1,224	
72 years	58	The Wonderful World of Disney	ABC	February 1, 1986	May 21, 1988	1,224	
72 years	58	The Wonderful World of Disney	NBC	October 8, 1988	August 26, 1990	1,224	
72 years	58	The Wonderful World of Disney	CBS	September 23, 1990	December 1, 1996	1,224	
72 years	58	The Wonderful World of Disney	ABC	September 28, 1997	December 24, 2008	1,224	
72 years	58	The Wonderful World of Disney	ABC	December 12, 2015	present	1,224	
72 years	58	The Wonderful World of Disney	Disney+	May 20, 2020	present	1,224	
72 years	73	Face the Nation (CBS News)	CBS	November 7, 1954	present	3,000+	
70 years	64	NFL on CBS	CBS	September 30, 1956	January 23, 1994	6,133	CBS originally broadcast NFL games from 1956 to its merger with the AFL in 1970. It continued to broadcast NFC regular and playoff games as well as the Super Bowl until 1994 when CBS lost the rights to broadcast these games to Fox. The network returned its football broadcasts by 1998 after CBS acquired the rights to broadcast AFC regular and playoff games from NBC. It also airs Super Bowl matches and between 2014 and 2017, Thursday Night Football alongside NBC in 2016 and 2017 and the NFL Network.
70 years	64	NFL on CBS	CBS	September 6, 1998	present	6,133	
63 years	58	General Hospital (ABC Daytime)	ABC	April 1, 1963	present	16,000	Television's longest-running drama series.

== 50–59 years ==
Length	Number of seasons	Series	Network	First broadcast	Last broadcast	Number of episodes	Notes
61 years	61	Days of Our Lives (NBC Daytime)	NBC	November 8, 1965	September 9, 2022	15,000	
61 years	61	Days of Our Lives (NBC Daytime)	Peacock	September 12, 2022	present	15,000	
57 years	57	Guiding Light (CBS Daytime)	CBS	June 30, 1952	September 18, 2009	15,762	Longest-running daytime drama. While its television debut was on June 30, 1952, The Guiding Light's first incarnation was as a radio show, which premiered on January 25, 1937.
59 years	49	Washington Week	NET	February 23, 1967	October 1970	2,000+	
59 years	49	Washington Week	PBS	October 1970	present	2,000+	
58 years	58	60 Minutes (CBS News)	CBS	September 24, 1968	present	2,500+	
54 years	54	As the World Turns (CBS Daytime)	CBS	April 2, 1956	September 17, 2010	13,858	
57 years	56	Sesame Street	NET	November 10, 1969	May 8, 1970	4,744 (Note: Season 44 (2013–2014) was the first time episodes were numbered in a seasonal order rather than the numerical and chronological fashion used since the show premiered. For example, episode 4401 means "the 1st episode of the 44th season", not "the 4,401st episode" (it is in fact the 4,328th episode).)	Longest-running children's show. While Sesame Street remains on the PBS schedule with second-run rights, new episodes now premiere on HBO Max and become available to PBS nine months later. This formerly applied to HBO from 2016 until 2020, starting from Season 51 when the show moved to (HBO) Max.
57 years	56	Sesame Street	PBS (PBS Kids)	November 9, 1970	present	4,744	Longest-running children's show. While Sesame Street remains on the PBS schedule with second-run rights, new episodes now premiere on HBO Max and become available to PBS nine months later. This formerly applied to HBO from 2016 until 2020, starting from Season 51 when the show moved to (HBO) Max.
57 years	56	Sesame Street	HBO	January 16, 2016	November 1, 2020	4,744	Longest-running children's show. While Sesame Street remains on the PBS schedule with second-run rights, new episodes now premiere on HBO Max and become available to PBS nine months later. This formerly applied to HBO from 2016 until 2020, starting from Season 51 when the show moved to (HBO) Max.
57 years	56	Sesame Street	(HBO) Max	November 21, 2020	present	4,744	Longest-running children's show. While Sesame Street remains on the PBS schedule with second-run rights, new episodes now premiere on HBO Max and become available to PBS nine months later. This formerly applied to HBO from 2016 until 2020, starting from Season 51 when the show moved to (HBO) Max.
56 years	57	NBC Nightly News (NBC News)	NBC	August 3, 1970	present		NBC has had an evening broadcast since 1948, starting with Camel News Caravan, lasting until 1956, when it was replaced by Nightly News' predecessor, the Huntley-Brinkley Report.
56 years	57 (through 2026 season)	Monday Night Football	ABC	September 21, 1970	December 26, 2005	1,000+	Since 2016 and 2018 respectively, ABC has simulcast ESPN's coverage of its NFL Wild Card playoff game and the Pro Bowl. In 2020, ABC simulcasted three select ESPN Monday Night Football games. Starting in 2021, ABC will get expanded broadcast rights, including exclusive games, Week 18 Saturday doubleheader simulcasts, and Super Bowl rights; the network carried most games in the package in 2023 and 2024. Per NFL policy, all games that are broadcast via cable or satellite television on a pay-TV network must also be made available on over-the-air television stations in each participating team's local market, with ABC stations often filling this role if not scheduled by the network.
56 years	57 (through 2026 season)	Monday Night Football	ESPN	September 11, 2006	present	1,000+	
56 years	57 (through 2026 season)	Monday Night Football	ABC	January 9, 2016	present	1,000+	
55 years	53	Masterpiece	PBS	January 10, 1971	present		
54 years	54	The Price Is Right (CBS Daytime)	CBS	September 4, 1972	present	9,000+	Longest-running game show.
53 years	49	The Young and the Restless (CBS Daytime)	CBS	March 26, 1973	present	12,500	
54 years	51	Great Performances	PBS	November 4, 1972	present		
52 years	53	Nova	PBS	March 3, 1974	present	975	

== 40–49 years ==
Length	Number of seasons	Series	Network	First broadcast	Last broadcast	Number of episodes	Notes
51 years	52	Saturday Night Live	NBC	October 11, 1975	present	1,014	Longest-running sketch comedy show on American television.
51 years	40	PBS NewsHour	PBS	October 20, 1975	present		
51 years	50	Good Morning America	ABC	November 3, 1975	present	9,914+	
50 years	50	Austin City Limits	PBS	January 3, 1976	present	900	The 1st episode was a one-off filmed in 1974 and broadcast in 1975. It became a regular series in 1976.
48 years	48	20/20	ABC	June 6, 1978	present	500+	
47 years	48	CBS News Sunday Morning	CBS	January 28, 1979	present		
45 years	45	Wide World of Sports (ABC Sports)	ABC	April 29, 1961	August 2006		
47 years	47	This Old House	PBS	February 20, 1979	present	1,136	
46 years	38	Nightline	ABC	March 24, 1980	present		
45 years	35	Noticiero Univision	Univision	June 1, 1981	present		
43 years	43	One Life to Live (ABC Daytime)	ABC	July 15, 1968	January 13, 2012	11,096	
42 years	43	Live from Lincoln Center	PBS	January 30, 1976	2019	251	
44 years	44	Nature	PBS	October 10, 1982	present	615	
41 years	41	All My Children (ABC Daytime)	ABC	January 5, 1970	September 23, 2011	10,712	Program aired two additional seasons through The Online Network, but is now out of production.
43 years	43	Frontline	PBS	January 17, 1983	present	813	
43 years	syndication: 43	Wheel of Fortune (syndicated)	Syndicated	September 5, 1983	present	8,000+	
40 years	40	Nightly Business Report	PBS	January 22, 1979	December 27, 2019	10,680	
42 years	43	Jeopardy!	Syndication	September 10, 1984	present	9,000+	

== 30–39 years ==
Length	Number of seasons	Series	Network	First broadcast	Last broadcast	Number of episodes	Notes
39 years	29	The Bold and the Beautiful	CBS	March 23, 1987	present	9,000	
37 years	36	The Woodwright's Shop	PBS	1979	2017	481	
40 years	29	Hometime	PBS	November 1, 1986	present		
38 years	39	48 Hours	CBS	January 2, 1988	present	1,494	
38 years	37	American Experience	PBS	October 1, 1988	present	388	
37 years	38	Cops	Fox	March 11, 1989	May 4, 2013	1,279	
37 years	38	Cops	Spike / Paramount Network	September 14, 2013	May 11, 2020	1,279	
37 years	38	Cops	Fox Nation	October 1, 2021	present	1,279	
37 years	27	Ciao Italia with Mary Ann Esposito	PBS / National Educational Telecommunications Association syndication	October 1, 1989	present		
35 years	35	Professional Bowlers Tour (ABC Sports)	ABC	January 6, 1962	June 21, 1997		
35 years	35	Search for Tomorrow (CBS and NBC Daytime)	CBS	September 3, 1951	March 29, 1982	9,130	
35 years	35	Search for Tomorrow (CBS and NBC Daytime)	NBC	March 26, 1982	December 26, 1986	9,130	
35 years	35	Another World (NBC Daytime)	NBC	May 4, 1964	June 25, 1999	8,891	Longest-running continuous title sequences on television
35 years	41	The Victory Garden	PBS	April 16, 1975	2010		
34 years	35	Wall Street Week with Louis Rukeyser	PBS	November 20, 1970	June 24, 2005		
34 years	35	Evening at Pops	PBS	July 12, 1970	August 29, 2004		Longest-running cooking program.
36 years	37	America's Funniest Home Videos	ABC	November 26, 1989	present	844	
36 years	38	The Simpsons	Fox	January 14, 1990	present	816	Longest-running animated series, longest-running sitcom and longest-running scripted primetime series.
36 years	26	Law & Order	NBC	September 13, 1990	May 24, 2010	550	
36 years	26	Law & Order	NBC	February 24, 2022	present	550	
33 years	33	Mister Rogers' Neighborhood	NET	February 19, 1968	October 1970	895	
33 years	33	Mister Rogers' Neighborhood	PBS	October 1970	August 31, 2001	895	
32 years	43	MotorWeek	PBS	1982	present	1,929	
34 years	34	Dateline NBC	NBC	March 31, 1992	present		
31 years	31	Lamp Unto My Feet	CBS	November 21, 1948	January 21, 1979		
30 years	30	American Bandstand	ABC	August 5, 1957	November 5, 1987	4,134	
30 years	30	Live from the Met	PBS	1977	2007		
32 years	33 (through 2026 season)	Fox NFL Sunday	Fox	September 18, 1994	present		

== 20–29 years ==
Length	Number of seasons	Series	Network	First broadcast	Last broadcast	Number of episodes	Notes
29 years	29	Love of Life	CBS	September 24, 1951	February 1, 1980	7,316	
29 years	30	Sábado Gigante	Univision	April 12, 1986	September 19, 2015	2,800+	Longest-running imported TV show.
28 years	28	The Late Late Show	CBS	January 9, 1995	April 27, 2023	5,346	
29 years	29	Captain Kangaroo	CBS	October 3, 1955	December 8, 1984		
28 years	28	The Edge of Night	CBS	April 2, 1956	November 28, 1975	7,420	
28 years	28	The Edge of Night	ABC	December 1, 1975	December 28, 1984	7,420	
28 years	28	Mystery!	PBS	February 5, 1980	2008		
25 years	25	Charlie Rose	PBS	September 30, 1991	November 17, 2017		
27 years	28	WWE SmackDown	UPN	April 29, 1999	September 15, 2006	1422	
27 years	28	WWE SmackDown	The CW	September 22, 2006	September 26, 2008	1422	
27 years	28	WWE SmackDown	MyNetworkTV	October 3, 2008	September 24, 2010	1422	
27 years	28	WWE SmackDown	Syfy	October 1, 2010	December 31, 2015	1422	
27 years	28	WWE SmackDown	USA	January 7, 2016	September 24, 2019	1422	
27 years	28	WWE SmackDown	Fox	October 4, 2019	September 6, 2024	1422	
27 years	28	WWE SmackDown	USA	September 13, 2024	present	1422	
24 years	24	Camera Three	CBS	January 22, 1956	January 21, 1979		
24 years	24	Camera Three	PBS	October 4, 1979	July 1, 1980		
24 years	24	CBS Morning News	CBS	September 2, 1963	January 9, 1987		
23 years	23	The Ed Sullivan Show	CBS	June 20, 1948	June 6, 1971	1,087	
23 years	23	America's Most Wanted	Fox	February 1, 1988	June 18, 2011	940+	
23 years	23	Lilias, Yoga and You	PBS	1976	1999		
23 years	23	Reading Rainbow	PBS	June 6, 1983	November 10, 2006	155	
22 years	22	The Original Amateur Hour	DuMont	January 18, 1948	October 1949		
22 years	22	The Original Amateur Hour	NBC	October 1949	September 1954		
22 years	22	The Original Amateur Hour	ABC	October 1955	June 1957		
22 years	22	The Original Amateur Hour	NBC	July 1957	October 1958		
22 years	22	The Original Amateur Hour	CBS	May 1959	October 1959		
22 years	22	The Original Amateur Hour	ABC	March 1960	September 26, 1960		
22 years	22	The Original Amateur Hour	CBS	October 2, 1960	September 27, 1970		
22 years	22	Jimmy Kimmel Live!	ABC	January 26, 2003	present		
22 years	22	NASCAR on CBS	CBS	February 18, 1979	July 15, 2000		
22 years	22	NFL on NBC	NBC	1975	1997		
21 years	21	Issues and Answers	ABC	1960	1981		
21 years	21	Sneak Previews	PBS	1975	1996		
21 years	21	Cookin' Cheap	PBS	1981	2002		
21 years	21	The New Yankee Workshop	PBS	January 1988	June 27, 2009	284	
20 years	20	The Doctors	NBC	April 1, 1963	December 31, 1982	5,280	
20 years	20	The Secret Storm	NBC	February 1, 1954	February 8, 1974	5,195	
20 years	20	The Red Skelton Show	NBC	September 30, 1951	June 1953	672	
20 years	20	The Red Skelton Show	CBS	September 1953	June 1970	672	
20 years	20	The Red Skelton Show	NBC	September 1970	August 1, 1971	672	

== See also ==
- List of longest-running American television series
- List of longest-running American cable television series
- List of longest-running American primetime television series
- List of longest-running American first-run syndicated television series
- List of longest-running scripted American primetime television series
- List of longest-running television shows by category
- List of longest-running Philippine television series
- List of longest-running British television programmes
- List of longest-running Australian television series
- List of television series canceled after one episode
- List of television series canceled before airing an episode
