= List of longest-running American first-run syndicated television series =

This is a list of the longest running American first-run syndicated television series, ordered by number of broadcast seasons.

To qualify for this list, the programming must originate in North America, shown nationally in the United States, and be first-run syndicated (as opposed to previously aired material, repackaging of previously aired material, or material released in other media). For the purposes of this list, series that were available only on a local or regional basis will be excluded. For series that were presented on American broadcast networks or cable networks at other points in their runs, only the amount aired nationally as original first-run syndicated programming is represented here.

Several long-lasting series were both in first-run syndication and on American network television. For those that were in syndication for fewer than ten seasons, see List of longest-running American television series.

== List ==
Series shaded in light blue are currently in production.

=== 25 seasons and up ===
Seasons	Series	First broadcast	Last broadcast	Number of episodes
56	Sesame Street	November 10, 1969	present	4,744 (Note: Season 44 (2013–2014) was the first time episodes were numbered in a seasonal order rather than the numerical and chronological fashion used since the show premiered. For example, episode 4401 means "the 1st episode of the 44th season", not "the 4,401st episode" (it is in fact the 4,328th episode).)
41	The 700 Club	April 1, 1966	present	
41	Divorce Court	1957	present	5,767+
38	The People's Court	September 14, 1981	July 21, 2023	
40	Wheel of Fortune	September 19, 1983	present	7,000+
39	Jeopardy! (revival series)	September 10, 1984	present	9,000+
35	Soul Train	October 2, 1971	March 25, 2006	1,117
32	Entertainment Tonight	September 14, 1981	present	
40	MotorWeek	October 15, 1981	present	
31	The Maury Povich Show	September 9, 1991	September 8, 2022	5,545
31	The McLaughlin Group	January 1, 1982	December 25, 2020	
29	NFL Films Presents	1968	1997	
29	America's Black Forum	1977	present	
29	At the Movies	1981	2012	
27	Donahue	November 6, 1967	September 13, 1996	5,515
27	The Jerry Springer Show	September 30, 1991	July 26, 2018	5,084
26	The David Susskind Show	1961	1987	
26	Faith for Today	1955	1981	
25	Live! with Kelly and Ryan	September 5, 1988	present	7,580+
25	Inside Edition	October 9, 1988	present	6,625+
25	Insight	October 2, 1960	January 21, 1985	250
25	The Oprah Winfrey Show	September 8, 1986	May 25, 2011	4,561
25	Judge Judy	September 16, 1996	July 23, 2021	6,280

=== 15–24 seasons ===
Seasons	Series	First broadcast	Last broadcast	Number of episodes
23	Death Valley Days	March 1, 1952	August 1, 1975	558
23	Family Feud (second revival series)	September 20, 1999	present	2,390
23	Divorce Court (revival series)	September 5, 1999	present	2,076+
23	Judge Mathis	September 13, 1999	May 25, 2023	3,000+
21	Showtime at the Apollo	September 12, 1987	May 24, 2008	1,093
21	Hee Haw	1971	1992	
21	This Week in Baseball	1977	1998	
21	The Porter Wagoner Show	1960	1981	
20	Gunsmoke	September 10, 1955	March 31, 1975	635
19	Extra	September 5, 1994	present	
19	Entertainers with Byron Allen	September 1994	present	
18	The Merv Griffin Show	1965	1969	
18	The Merv Griffin Show	April 1972	September 1986	
17	Access Hollywood	September 9, 1996	present	
17	Mutual of Omaha's Wild Kingdom	1971	1988	
17	The Montel Williams Show	June 24, 1991	May 16, 2008	4,325
16	Dr. Phil	September 16, 2002	May 25, 2023	1,671
16	The People's Court (revival series)	September 8, 1997	July 21, 2023	1,500+
16	Kickin' It with Byron Allen	1994	present	
16	Fight Back! with David Horowitz	1976	1992	
16	The George Michael Sports Machine	September 15, 1991	March 25, 2007	
15	Supernatural	September 13, 2005	November 19, 2020	327
15	That Good Ole Nashville Music	1970	1985	
15	Jack Hanna's Animal Adventures	September 1, 1993	May 24, 2008	
15	The Talk	October 18, 2010	December 20, 2024	2,993

=== 10–14 seasons ===
Seasons	Series	First broadcast	Last broadcast	Number of episodes
14	The Doctors	September 8, 2008	August 8, 2022	1,041+
14	Family Feud (second revival series)	September 20, 1999	present	2,390
14	Divorce Court (revival series)	September 5, 1999	present	2,076+
14	The Jack LaLanne Show	1956	1970	
13	The Ellen DeGeneres Show	September 8, 2003	May 26, 2022	3,294
13	Cheaters	October 2, 2000	August 30, 2021	264
13	PM Magazine	September 1978	January 1, 1991	
12	Star Search	September 10, 1983	May 20, 1995	
12	Divorce Court (original series)	1957	1969	
12	The People's Court (original series)	September 14, 1981	May 28, 1993	2,484
12	Lifestyles of the Rich and Famous	January 1984	September 1996	
12	The Jenny Jones Show	September 16, 1991	September 12, 2003	
12	America's Court with Judge Ross	September 20, 2010	present	
11	Who Wants to Be a Millionaire	September 16, 2002	May 31, 2019	1,950
11	The Wendy Williams Show	July 14, 2008	June 17, 2022	1,500+
11	The Wilburn Brothers Show	1963	1974	354
11	The Lawrence Welk Show	1971	February 1982	
11	Love Connection	September 12, 1983	July 1, 1994	
11	Geraldo	1987	1998	
11	Martha Stewart Living	1993	2004	
11	Paula's Home Cooking	2002	2013	123
11	Ricki Lake	September 13, 1993	August 27, 2004	
10	A Current Affair	July 28, 1986	September 1996	
10	Hard Copy	September 18, 1989	April 26, 1999	2159
10	Baywatch	October 1991	May 24, 2001	242
10	Smallville	October 16, 2001	May 13, 2011	217
10	Stargate SG-1	July 27, 1997	March 13, 2007	214

== See also ==
- List of sitcoms broadcast in first-run syndication
- List of television programs by episode count
- List of television series canceled after one episode
- List of television series canceled before airing an episode
- List of longest-running American cable television series
- List of longest-running American broadcast network television series
- List of longest-running American primetime television series
- List of longest-running American television series
