= List of longest-running American primetime television series =

This is a list of the longest running American primetime television series, ordered by the number of broadcast seasons offered by an American broadcast network or cable network in prime time on the show's original run. Broadcast syndication that could have been scheduled by local stations in prime time have been omitted.

== Longest-lasting series ==
Series shaded in light blue are in production.

=== 50 seasons or more ===
| Number of seasons | Series | Genre/subject | Network | First broadcast | Last broadcast | Number of episodes |
|---|---|---|---|---|---|---|
| 69 | Hallmark Hall of Fame (Note: Originally Hallmark Playhouse radio series, was Hallmark Television Playhouse (1951–1954)) | Anthology | NBC | December 24, 1951 | December 17, 1978 | 260 |
| 69 | Hallmark Hall of Fame | Anthology | CBS | November 14, 1979 | April 30, 1981 | 260 |
| 69 | Hallmark Hall of Fame | Anthology | PBS | February 9, 1981 | May 6, 1981 | 260 |
| 69 | Hallmark Hall of Fame | Anthology | CBS | December 1, 1981 | January 29, 1989 | 260 |
| 69 | Hallmark Hall of Fame | Anthology | ABC | April 30, 1989 | April 23, 1995 | 260 |
| 69 | Hallmark Hall of Fame | Anthology | CBS | December 10, 1995 | April 24, 2011 | 260 |
| 69 | Hallmark Hall of Fame | Anthology | ABC | November 27, 2011 | April 20, 2014 | 260 |
| 69 | Hallmark Hall of Fame | Anthology | Hallmark Channel | November 30, 2014 | present | 260 |
| 58 | The Wonderful World of Disney (Note: Disney anthology television series aired under a variety of titles, including Walt Disney's Disneyland, Walt Disney Presents, Walt Disney's Wonderful World of Color, Disney's Wonderful World, Walt Disney, The Disney Sunday Movie, and The Magical World of Disney. The current title is The Wonderful World of Disney. See the main article for a complete broadcast history) | Anthology | ABC | October 27, 1954 | June 11, 1961 | 2,207 |
| 58 | The Wonderful World of Disney | Anthology | NBC | September 24, 1961 | August 16, 1981 | 2,207 |
| 58 | The Wonderful World of Disney | Anthology | CBS | September 26, 1981 | September 24, 1983 | 2,207 |
| 58 | The Wonderful World of Disney | Anthology | ABC | February 1, 1986 | May 21, 1988 | 2,207 |
| 58 | The Wonderful World of Disney | Anthology | NBC | October 8, 1988 | August 25, 1990 | 2,207 |
| 58 | The Wonderful World of Disney | Anthology | CBS | September 23, 1990 | December 1, 1996 | 2,207 |
| 58 | The Wonderful World of Disney | Anthology | ABC | September 28, 1997 | December 24, 2008 | 2,207 |
| 58 | The Wonderful World of Disney | Anthology | ABC | December 12, 2015 | present | 2,207 |
| 58 | The Wonderful World of Disney | Anthology | Disney+ | May 20, 2020 | present | 2,207 |
| 58 | 60 Minutes | News magazine | CBS | September 24, 1968 | present | 2,500+ |
| 57 (through 2026 season) | Monday Night Football | Sports, football | ABC | September 21, 1970 | December 26, 2005 | 1,000+ |
| 57 (through 2026 season) | Monday Night Football | Sports, football | ESPN | August 14, 2006 | present | 1,000+ |
| 53 | Sábado Gigante (Note: Continuation of series that aired 1962–1985 on Chile's Canal 13) | Spanish programming | Univisión | August 5, 1962 (Chile); May 20, 1986 (United States) | September 19, 2015 | |
| 52 | Nova | Science | PBS | February 24, 1974 | present | 1008 (February 11, 2026) |
| 51 | Survivor | Reality competition | CBS | May 31, 2000 | present | 735 |
| 51 | Saturday Night Live | Variety show | NBC | October 11, 1975 | present | 984 |
| 50 | Austin City Limits | Music | PBS | January 3, 1976 | present | 900 |

=== 30–49 seasons ===
| Number of seasons | Series | Genre/subject | Network | First broadcast | Last broadcast | Number of episodes |
|---|---|---|---|---|---|---|
| 48 | Masterpiece (Note: Originally Masterpiece Theatre) | Anthology | PBS | January 10, 1971 | present | |
| 48 | 20/20 | News magazine | ABC | June 6, 1978 | present | 500+ |
| 47 | This Old House | Home improvement | PBS | February 20, 1979 | present | 1,196 |
| 44 | Nature | Documentary | PBS | October 10, 1982 | present | 615 |
| 43 | Live from Lincoln Center | Music | PBS | January 30, 1976 | January 30, 2019 (Note: Not currently on a regular schedule) | 251 |
| 43 | Frontline | Public affairs | PBS | January 17, 1983 | present | 813 |
| 42 | Inside the NFL | Sports, football | HBO | September 22, 1977 | February 6, 2008 | |
| 42 | Inside the NFL | Sports, football | Showtime | September 10, 2008 | February 24, 2021 | |
| 42 | Inside the NFL | Sports, football | Paramount+ | September 7, 2021 | April 5, 2023 | |
| 42 | Inside the NFL | Sports, football | The CW | September 9, 2023 | present | |
| 42 | The Challenge | Reality game show | MTV | June 1, 1998 | present | 597 |
| 41 | National Geographic Explorer (Note: Host: Tom Chapin (1985–1988), Robert Urich (1988–1995), Bob Ballard (1988–1995), Boyd Matson (1995–2003), Michael Fay (2001), Lisa Ling (2003–2010)) | Documentary | Nickelodeon | April 7, 1985 | February 1986 | 233 |
| 41 | National Geographic Explorer | Documentary | WTBS/TBS | February 1986 | September 1999 | 233 |
| 41 | National Geographic Explorer | Documentary | CNBC | September 1999 | October 2001 | 233 |
| 41 | National Geographic Explorer | Documentary | MSNBC (Note: Show renamed National Geographic Ultimate Explorer, 2003–2005) | October 2001 | July 2004 | 233 |
| 41 | National Geographic Explorer | Documentary | National Geographic Channel | July 8, 2004 | present | 233 |
| 39 | The Amazing Race | Reality competition | CBS | September 5, 2001 | present | 451 |
| 37 | The Woodwright's Shop | Woodworking | PBS | 1979 | 2017 | 468 |
| 37 | POV | Documentary | PBS | July 5, 1988 | present | 400+ |
| 38 | Cops | Reality | Fox | March 11, 1989 | May 4, 2013 | 1,279 |
| 38 | Cops | Reality | Spike / Paramount Network | September 14, 2013 | May 11, 2020 | 1,279 |
| 38 | Cops | Reality | Fox Nation | October 1, 2021 | present | 1,279 |
| 38 | The Simpsons (Note: Longest-running primetime animated program in the United States) | Animated sitcom | Fox | January 14, 1990 (Note: Sneak peek airing December 17, 1989) | present | 816 |
| 36 | The Victory Garden | Gardening | PBS | April 16, 1975 | 2010 | |
| 39 | 48 Hours (Note: Also called "48 Hours Investigates") | Documentary/news magazine | CBS | January 2, 1988 | present | 1,494 |
| 37 | American Experience | Documentary | PBS | October 1, 1988 | present | 388 |
| 37 | America's Funniest Home Videos | Reality, comedy | ABC | November 26, 1989 | present | 844 |
| 35 | Wall Street Week (Note: Became Wall Street Week with Fortune after original host was fired in 2002) | News, economics | PBS | November 20, 1970 | June 24, 2005 | |
| 34 (first incarnation) | Firing Line | Public affairs | Syndication | 1966 (Note: Pilot taped April 4, 1966) | 1971 | 1,504 (first incarnation) |
| 34 (first incarnation) | Firing Line | Public affairs | PBS | 1971 | December 26, 1999 | 1,504 (first incarnation) |
| 34 (first incarnation) | Firing Line | Public affairs | PBS | June 22, 2018 | present | 1,504 (first incarnation) |
| 34 | Dateline NBC (Note: Also known as Dateline (day of week it airs), Dateline With Stone Phillips) | News magazine | NBC | March 31, 1992 | present | |
| 33 | WWE Monday Night Raw | Professional wrestling | USA | January 11, 1993 | September 18, 2000 | 1747 |
| 33 | WWE Monday Night Raw | Professional wrestling | TNN / Spike | September 25, 2000 | September 26, 2005 | 1747 |
| 33 | WWE Monday Night Raw | Professional wrestling | USA | October 3, 2005 | December 30, 2024 | 1747 |
| 33 | WWE Monday Night Raw | Professional wrestling | Netflix | January 6, 2025 | present | 1747 |
| 35 | Dancing with the Stars | Reality competition | ABC | June 1, 2005 | November 22, 2021 | 525 |
| 35 | Dancing with the Stars | Reality competition | Disney+ | September 19, 2022 | present | 525 |
| 35 | Dancing with the Stars | Reality competition | ABC | September 26, 2023 | present | 525 |
| 33 | The Real World | Reality | MTV | May 21, 1992 | January 4, 2017 | 614 |
| 33 | The Real World | Reality | Facebook Watch | June 13, 2019 | August 29, 2019 | 614 |

=== 20–29 seasons ===
| Number of seasons | Series | Genre/subject | Network | First broadcast | Last broadcast | Number of episodes |
|---|---|---|---|---|---|---|
| 29 | Real Sports with Bryant Gumbel | Monthly sports news magazine | HBO | April 2, 1995 | December 19, 2023 | 320 |
| 29 | Antiques Roadshow | Bargain hunt | PBS | January 1, 1997 | present | |
| 29 | The Bachelor | Romance, reality | ABC | March 25, 2002 | present | 306 |
| 28 | America's Most Wanted | Reality | Fox | February 7, 1988 | June 18, 2011 | 1,101 |
| 28 | America's Most Wanted | Reality | Lifetime | December 2, 2011 | October 12, 2012 | 1,101 |
| 28 | America's Most Wanted | Reality | Fox | March 15, 2021 | present | 1,101 |
| 29 | South Park | Animated sitcom | Comedy Central | August 13, 1997 | present | 343 |
| 30 | The Voice | Reality | NBC | April 26, 2011 | present | 689 |
| 27 | Live from the Met (Note: Also known as The Metropolitan Opera Presents) | Music | PBS | 1977 | present | 95 |
| 28 | Big Brother | Reality competition | CBS | July 5, 2000 | present | 1,016 |
| 28 | Law & Order: Special Victims Unit | Crime drama | NBC | September 20, 1999 | present | 600 |
| 26 | Mystery! | Anthology | PBS | 1980 | 2006 | |
| 26 | Grand Ole Opry (Note: Oldest continuously running radio program, airing on WSM radio, Nashville, Tennessee) | Music | TNN | April 20, 1985 | August 2001 | |
| 26 | Grand Ole Opry | Music | CMT | August 2001 | 2003 | |
| 26 | Grand Ole Opry | Music | GAC (Note: As Grand Ole Opry Live!) | 2003 | 2011 | |
| 25 | Camera Three | Anthology | CBS | January 22, 1956 | 1979 | |
| 25 | Camera Three | Anthology | PBS | 1979 | July 1, 1980 | |
| 25 | What's My Line? (Note: Longest-running game show in primetime network television; first-run syndication 1968–1975) (network version) | Panel game show | CBS | February 16, 1950 | September 3, 1967 | CBS: 876; Syndication: 1,320; Total: 2,196 |
| 25 | What's My Line? (network version) | Panel game show | Syndication | September 1968 | September 3, 1975 | CBS: 876; Syndication: 1,320; Total: 2,196 |
| 26 | Law & Order (Note: Longest-running live-action hour-long prime time entertainment program in the United States. While Gunsmoke has accumulated more episodes (635), 233 of its episodes were half-hour dramas. All of Law & Order's episodes have been one hour long.) | Crime drama | NBC | September 13, 1990 | May 24, 2010 | 550 |
| 26 | Law & Order | Crime drama | NBC | February 24, 2022 | present | 550 |
| 25 | Nick News (Note: Previously Nick News W/5 and Nick News with Linda Ellerbee) | Children's news program | Nickelodeon | April 18, 1992 | December 15, 2015 | |
| 25 | Nick News | Children's news program | Nickelodeon | June 29, 2020 | present | |
| 24 | The Ed Sullivan Show (Note: Aired as Toast of the Town until 1955) | Variety show | CBS | June 20, 1948 | June 6, 1971 | 1,068 |
| 24 | Concentration | Game show | NBC | August 25, 1958 | March 20, 1973 | 3,770 (1958–1973); 975 (1973–1978); 1,090 (1987–1991) |
| 24 | Concentration | Game show | Syndication | September 10, 1973 | September 8, 1978 | 3,770 (1958–1973); 975 (1973–1978); 1,090 (1987–1991) |
| 24 | Concentration | Game show | NBC | May 4, 1987 | August 30, 1991 | 3,770 (1958–1973); 975 (1973–1978); 1,090 (1987–1991) |
| 23 | Crossfire | Talk/news program | CNN | 1982 | June 3, 2005 | |
| 23 | Crossfire | Talk/news program | CNN | September 9, 2013 | August 6, 2014 | |
| 25 | American Idol | Reality | Fox | June 11, 2002 | April 7, 2016 | 734 |
| 25 | American Idol | Reality | ABC | March 11, 2018 | present | 734 |
| 24 | NCIS | Military police procedural | CBS | September 23, 2003 | present | 513 |
| 22 | E! News (Note: Previously E! News Daily and E! News Live) | Entertainment newscast | E! | September 1, 1991 | present | 7,500+ |
| 22 | Investigative Reports | Reality | A&E | September 27, 1991 | 2004 | |
| 22 | Ted Mack and The Original Amateur Hour (Note: Originated on radio as Major Bowes' Original Amateur Hour, 1934–1946) | Reality | DuMont | January 18, 1948 | October 1949 | |
| 22 | Ted Mack and The Original Amateur Hour | Reality | NBC | October 1949 | September 1954 | |
| 22 | Ted Mack and The Original Amateur Hour | Reality | ABC | October 1955 | June 1957 | |
| 22 | Ted Mack and The Original Amateur Hour | Reality | NBC | July 1957 | October 1958 | |
| 22 | Ted Mack and The Original Amateur Hour | Reality | CBS | May 1959 | October 1959 | |
| 22 | Ted Mack and The Original Amateur Hour | Reality | ABC | March 1960 | September 26, 1960 | |
| 22 | Ted Mack and The Original Amateur Hour | Reality | CBS | October 2, 1960 | September 27, 1970 | |
| 23 | Grey's Anatomy | Drama | ABC | March 27, 2005 | present | 472 |
| 21 | The New Yankee Workshop | Western woodworking | PBS | January 1988 | June 27, 2009 | 284 |
| 22 | American Dad! | Animated sitcom | Fox | May 1, 2005 (Note: Sneak peek airing February 6, 2005) | September 21, 2014 | 401 |
| 22 | American Dad! | Animated sitcom | TBS | October 24, 2014 | present | 401 |
| 20 | NFL Primetime | Sports, football | ESPN | 1987 | present | |
| 20 | Biography (Note: Originated on CBS) | Documentary | A&E | April 6, 1987 (Note: Reran CBS originals, 1984–1987) | August 2006 | |
| 20 | Biography | Documentary | Biography Channel | August 2006 | present (Note: Rebroadcast A&E originals, 1999–2006) | |
| 20 | The Red Skelton Show | Variety show | NBC | September 30, 1951 | June 21, 1953 | 672 |
| 20 | The Red Skelton Show | Variety show | CBS | September 22, 1953 | June 23, 1970 | 672 |
| 20 | The Red Skelton Show | Variety show | NBC | September 14, 1970 | August 29, 1971 | 672 |
| 20 | Gunsmoke (Note: Longest-running live-action prime time entertainment program with a consistent setting and recurring characters. While other prime-time shows have run longer, they are all news, sports, anthology or variety programs.) | Drama | CBS | September 10, 1955 | March 31, 1975 | 635 |
| 20 | Moneyline | Editorial | CNN | June 1, 1980 | November 11, 2000 | |
| 21 | America's Got Talent | NBC | June 21, 2006 | present | 508 | |

=== 10–19 seasons ===
| Number of seasons | Series | Network | First broadcast | Last broadcast | Number of episodes |
|---|---|---|---|---|---|
| 19 | ESPN Sunday Night Football (Note: Moved to NBC in 2006, at which time Monday Night Football moved from ABC to ESPN) | ESPN | November 8, 1987 (Note: Sunday Night Football shared with TNT, with TNT getting the first half of the season, ESPN the second half, 1990–1997) | January 1, 2006 | |
| 19 | Lassie | CBS | September 12, 1954 | March 21, 1971 | 591 |
| 19 | Lassie | Syndication | October 7, 1971 | March 24, 1973 | 591 |
| 18 | ESPN Major League Baseball (Note: Includes Sunday Night Baseball, Wednesday Night Baseball, etc.) | ESPN / ESPN2 (Note: ESPN2 started broadcasting major league baseball games in 2002 in addition to those offered by ESPN) | April 15, 1990 | present | |
| 19 | Criminal Minds | CBS | September 22, 2005 | February 19, 2020 | 364 |
| 19 | Criminal Minds | Paramount+ | November 24, 2022 | present | 364 |
| 17 | Outside the Lines | ESPN | 1990 | present | |
| 17 | RuPaul’s Drag Race | MTV | February 2, 2009 | present | |
| 17 | Showbiz Today | CNN | October 29, 1984 | 2001 | |
| 17 | USA Tuesday Night Fights | USA | March 30, 1982 | 1998 | |
| 17 | Capital Gang | CNN | September 7, 1988 | 2005 | |
| 17 | Unsolved Mysteries | NBC | January 20, 1987 (Note: Includes series of specials, Jan. 1987 to May 1988) | September 5, 1997 | 611 |
| 17 | Unsolved Mysteries | CBS | November 13, 1997 | June 11, 1999 | 611 |
| 17 | Unsolved Mysteries | Lifetime | July 2, 2001 | September 20, 2002 | 611 |
| 17 | Unsolved Mysteries | Spike | October 13, 2008 | April 27, 2010 | 611 |
| 16 | Ghost Hunters | Sci Fi Channel / Syfy | October 6, 2004 | October 26, 2016 | 251 (+ 12 specials not included) |
| 16 | Ghost Hunters | A&E | August 21, 2019 | May 27, 2020 | 251 (+ 12 specials not included) |
| 16 | Ghost Hunters | Discovery+ | December 31, 2021 | March 19, 2022 | 251 (+ 12 specials not included) |
| 16 | Ghost Hunters | Travel Channel | October 1, 2022 | present | 251 (+ 12 specials not included) |
| 16 | MTV Unplugged | MTV | November 26, 1989 | present | |
| 16 | Bob's Burgers | Fox | January 9, 2011 | present | 313 |
| 16 | RuPaul’s Drag Race: Untucked! | MTV | February 1, 2010 | present | |
| 16 | Booknotes | C-SPAN | April 2, 1989 | December 5, 2004 | 801 |
| 16 | The Lawrence Welk Show (Note: Originally The Dodge Dancing Party; first-run syndication 1971–1982; reruns have been airing since 1982 on various PBS stations) | ABC | July 2, 1955 | September 4, 1971 | |
| 15 | Supernatural | The CW | September 13, 2005 | November 19, 2020 | 327 |
| 15 | ER | NBC | September 19, 1994 | April 2, 2009 | 331 |
| 15 | I've Got a Secret | CBS | June 19, 1952 | April 3, 1967 | CBS (1952–1967): 681; Syndication (1972–1973): 39; CBS (1976): 4 Oxygen (2000–2001): 120; GSN (2006): 40 |
| 15 | The Jack Benny Program | CBS | October 29, 1950 | September 15, 1964 | 261 |
| 15 | The Jack Benny Program | NBC | September 25, 1964 | September 10, 1965 | 261 |
| 15 | CSI: Crime Scene Investigation | CBS | October 6, 2000 | September 27, 2015 | 337 |
| 14 | World Poker Tour | Fox Sports Networks | March 30, 2003 | present | 420 |
| 14 | Armstrong Circle Theatre | NBC | June 6, 1950 | June 1957 | 370 |
| 14 | Armstrong Circle Theatre | CBS | October 1957 | August 28, 1963 | 370 |
| 14 | The Adventures of Ozzie and Harriet (Note: Longest running live-action sitcom.) | ABC | October 10, 1952 | September 3, 1966 | 435 |
| 14 | Bonanza (Note: First US network series to film all its episodes in color) | NBC | September 12, 1959 | January 16, 1973 | 431 |
| 14 | Dallas | CBS | April 2, 1978 | May 3, 1991 | 357 |
| 14 | Knots Landing | CBS | December 27, 1979 | May 13, 1993 | 344 |
| 14 | An Evening at the Improv | A&E | February 3, 1982 | January 1, 1996 | 303 |
| 14 | Video Soul | BET | June 26, 1983 | 1997 | |
| 14 | NCIS: Los Angeles | CBS | September 22, 2009 | May 21, 2023 | 323 |
| 15 | King of the Hill | Fox | January 12, 1997 | present | 279 |
| 14 | Mystery Science Theater 3000 | KTMA | November 24, 1988 | May 28, 1989 | 234 |
| 14 | Mystery Science Theater 3000 | The Comedy Channel | November 18, 1989 | February 2, 1991 | 234 |
| 14 | Mystery Science Theater 3000 | Comedy Central | June 1, 1991 | May 18, 1996 | 234 |
| 14 | Mystery Science Theater 3000 | Sci Fi Channel | February 1, 1997 | August 8, 1999 (Note: official end of series, although one "unofficial" episode (Merlin's Shop of Mystical Wonders) was shown on September 12, 1999) | 234 |
| 14 | Mystery Science Theater 3000 | Netflix | April 14, 2017 | November 22, 2018 | 234 |
| 14 | Mystery Science Theater 3000 | Gizmoplex | May 6, 2022 (Note: Pre-release date, March 4, 2022) | present | 234 |
| 14 | Blue Bloods | CBS | September 24, 2010 | December 13, 2024 | 293 |
| 13 | Tim Russert | CNBC | 1994 | 2008 | |
| 12 | American Horror Story | FX | October 5, 2011 | present | 132 |
| 12 | The Big Bang Theory | CBS | September 24, 2007 | May 16, 2019 | 279 |
| 12 | To Tell the Truth | CBS | December 18, 1956 | September 6, 1968 | |
| 12 | CBS Reports | CBS | October 27, 1959 | September 7, 1971 | |
| 12 | My Three Sons | ABC | September 29, 1960 | September 2, 1965 | 380 |
| 12 | My Three Sons | CBS | September 16, 1965 | August 24, 1972 | 380 |
| 12 | NYPD Blue | ABC | September 21, 1993 | March 1, 2005 | 261 |
| 12 | Wild America | PBS | 1982 | 1996 | 120 |
| 12 | Murder, She Wrote | CBS | September 1, 1984 | May 19, 1996 | 264 |
| 12 | Hawaii Five-O | CBS | September 26, 1968 | April 26, 1980 | 282 |
| 12 | Don Francisco Presenta | Univision | October 10, 2001 | January 30, 2012 | |
| 12 | Two and a Half Men | CBS | September 22, 2003 | February 19, 2015 | 262 |
| 12 | Bones | Fox | September 13, 2005 | March 28, 2017 | 246 |
| 12 | Curb Your Enthusiasm | HBO | October 15, 2000 | April 7, 2024 | 120 (and 1 special) |
| 11 | Murphy Brown | CBS | November 14, 1988 | May 18, 1998 | 260 |
| 11 | Murphy Brown | CBS | September 27, 2018 | December 20, 2018 | 260 |
| 11 | Kraft Television Theatre (Note: Also known as Kraft Mystery Theatre (1958); another series of the same name ran concurrently on ABC, 1953–1955) | NBC | May 7, 1947 | October 1, 1958 | 650 |
| 11 | The Voice of Firestone | NBC | September 5, 1949 | June 1954 | |
| 11 | The Voice of Firestone | ABC | June 1954 | June 1959 | |
| 11 | The Voice of Firestone | ABC | September 1962 | June 16, 1963 | |
| 11 | You Bet Your Life | NBC | October 5, 1950 | June 29, 1961 | 529 + 1 unaired |
| 11 | The Andy Williams Show | CBS | 1957 | 1959 | |
| 11 | The Andy Williams Show | NBC | 1962 | 1971 | |
| 11 | The Carol Burnett Show | CBS | September 11, 1967 | March 29, 1978 | 279 |
| 11 | M*A*S*H | CBS | September 17, 1972 | February 28, 1983 | 256 |
| 11 | Happy Days | ABC | January 15, 1974 | May 8, 1984 | 255 |
| 11 | Cheers | NBC | September 30, 1982 | May 20, 1993 | 275 |
| 11 | The Danny Thomas Show | ABC | September 20, 1953 | 1957 | 343 |
| 11 | The Danny Thomas Show | CBS | 1957 | September 14, 1964 | 343 |
| 11 | Frasier | NBC | September 16, 1993 | May 13, 2004 | 264 |
| 11 | Married... with Children | Fox | April 5, 1987 | June 9, 1997 | 259 |
| 11 | The Jeffersons | CBS | January 18, 1975 | July 23, 1985 | 253 |
| 11 | 7th Heaven (Note: Longest-running family drama on television.) | The WB | August 26, 1996 | May 8, 2006 | 243 |
| 11 | 7th Heaven | The CW | September 25, 2006 | May 13, 2007 | 243 |
| 11 | Modern Family | ABC | September 23, 2009 | April 8, 2020 | 250 |
| 11 | Will & Grace | NBC | September 21, 1998 | April 23, 2020 | 246 |
| 10 | The Goldbergs | ABC | September 24, 2013 | May 3, 2023 | 229 |
| 10 | Arthur Godfrey and His Friends | CBS | January 12, 1949 | April 28, 1959 | |
| 10 | Arthur Godfrey's Talent Scouts (Note: On CBS radio 1946–1956) | CBS | December 6, 1948 | July 21, 1958 | |
| 10 | Studio One (Note: Originated on CBS Radio, 1947) | CBS | November 7, 1948 | September 29, 1958 | |
| 10 | The Arthur Murray Party (Note: The first series to be shown on four US broadcasting networks) | ABC | July 20, 1950 | September 1950 | |
| 10 | The Arthur Murray Party | DuMont | October 1950 | March 1951 | |
| 10 | The Arthur Murray Party | ABC | April 1951 | May 1952 | |
| 10 | The Arthur Murray Party | CBS | July 1952 | August 1952 | |
| 10 | The Arthur Murray Party | NBC | October 1953 | September 1955 | |
| 10 | The Arthur Murray Party | CBS | April 1956 | September 1956 | |
| 10 | The Arthur Murray Party | NBC | July 1957 | September 6, 1960 | |
| 10 | General Electric Theater | CBS | February 1, 1953 | September 16, 1962 | 302 |
| 10 | Stargate SG-1 (Note: Longest-running science fiction series in the United States.) | Showtime | July 27, 1997 | May 17, 2002 | 214 + 2 DVD films |
| 10 | Stargate SG-1 | Sci Fi | June 7, 2002 | 2007 | 214 + 2 DVD films |
| 10 | Alfred Hitchcock Presents (Note: The Alfred Hitchcock Hour 1962–1965) | NBC | October 2, 1955 | June 26, 1960 | 268 (Alfred Hitchcock Presents); 93 (The Alfred Hitchcock Hour); 361 (total) |
| 10 | Alfred Hitchcock Presents | CBS | September 25, 1960 | June 26, 1962 (Note: One episode was not aired on network TV, but was included in later syndication packages.) | 268 (Alfred Hitchcock Presents); 93 (The Alfred Hitchcock Hour); 361 (total) |
| 10 | Alfred Hitchcock Presents | NBC | September 20, 1962 | July 3, 1964 | 268 (Alfred Hitchcock Presents); 93 (The Alfred Hitchcock Hour); 361 (total) |
| 10 | Alfred Hitchcock Presents | CBS | October 5, 1964 | May 10, 1965 | 268 (Alfred Hitchcock Presents); 93 (The Alfred Hitchcock Hour); 361 (total) |
| 10 | Nashville Now | TNN | March 1, 1983 | January 1, 1993 | Unknown |
| 10 | Friends | NBC | September 22, 1994 | May 6, 2004 | 236 (+ 1 special) |
| 10 | JAG | NBC | September 1, 1995 | May 22, 1996 (Note: One episode made its premiere on USA network as part of a JAG rerun package. The episode, planned to be the first of a two-part story, never aired on NBC before cancellation.) | 227 |
| 10 | JAG | CBS | January 3, 1997 | April 29, 2005 | 227 |
| 10 | Beverly Hills, 90210 | Fox | October 4, 1990 | May 17, 2000 | 293 |
| 10 | Pantomime Quiz (Note: Originally aired locally in Los Angeles, 1947–1950) | CBS | July 1, 1950 | August 1951 | |
| 10 | Pantomime Quiz | NBC | January 1952 | March 1952 | |
| 10 | Pantomime Quiz | CBS | July 1952 | May 1952 | |
| 10 | Pantomime Quiz | CBS | July 1952 | August 1953 | |
| 10 | Pantomime Quiz | DuMont | October 1953 | April 1954 | |
| 10 | Pantomime Quiz | CBS | June 1954 | August 1954 | |
| 10 | Pantomime Quiz | ABC | January 1955 | March 1955 | |
| 10 | Pantomime Quiz | CBS | July 1955 | July 1957 | |
| 10 | Pantomime Quiz | ABC | April 1958 | September 1959 | |
| 10 | The United States Steel Hour | ABC | October 27, 1953 | June 21, 1955 | 315 |
| 10 | The United States Steel Hour | CBS | July 6, 1955 | August 13, 1963 | 315 |
| 10 | Smallville | The WB | October 16, 2001 | May 11, 2006 | 217 |
| 10 | Smallville | The CW | September 28, 2006 | May 13, 2011 | 217 |
| 10 | Law & Order: Criminal Intent | NBC | September 30, 2001 | May 21, 2007 | 195 |
| 10 | Law & Order: Criminal Intent | USA | October 4, 2007 | June 26, 2011 | 195 |
| 10 | CSI: Miami | CBS | September 23, 2002 | April 8, 2012 | 232 |

== See also ==
- Lists of longest running American shows by broadcast type:
  - List of longest-running American television series
  - List of longest-running American broadcast network television series
  - List of longest-running American cable television series
  - List of longest-running American first-run syndicated television series
  - List of longest-running scripted American primetime television series
- Lists of longest running shows internationally:
  - List of longest-running television shows by category- international list
  - List of longest-running Australian television series
  - List of longest-running British television programmes
  - List of longest-running Philippine television series
- List of shortest running shows:
  - List of television series canceled after one episode
  - List of television series canceled before airing an episode
