= List of longest-running American cable television series =

This is a list of the longest running American cable television series, ordered by number of broadcast seasons.

To qualify for this list, the programming must originate in North America and shown nationally in the United States and be first-run (as opposed to a repackaging of previously aired material or material released in other media). For the purposes of this list, series that were available only on a local or regional basis will be excluded, along with hybrid broadcast/cable networks such as The WB 100+/The CW Plus. For series that originated on American broadcast networks (or broadcast syndication) and then was picked up by a national cable network, only the amount aired nationally on cable as original programming is represented here.

A season for the purpose of this article is defined as a given year, not a production cycle (as in America's Next Top Model) which is defined as a season by the network or by the program's distributor; for instance, multiple series on Food Network (e.g. Chopped) count each production cycle as a season rather than classing them by year.

== List ==
Series shaded in light blue are currently in production.

=== 25 or more seasons ===
Number of seasons	Series	Network	First broadcast	Last broadcast	Number of episodes
49	Ridiculousness	MTV	August 29, 2011	present	1,600+
48	Inside the NFL	HBO	September 22, 1977	February 6, 2008	
48	Inside the NFL	Showtime	September 10, 2008	February 23, 2021	
48	Inside the NFL	Paramount+	September 7, 2021	April 5, 2023	
48	Inside the NFL	The CW	September 9, 2023	May 31, 2025	
48	Inside the NFL	X/Twitter	September 22, 2025	present	
48	SportsCenter	ESPN	September 7, 1979	present	60,000+
46	Washington Journal	C-SPAN	October 7, 1980	present	
44–45	NASCAR on ESPN	ESPN / ESPN2	1981	2002	
44–45	NASCAR on ESPN	ESPN / ESPN2	2007	2014	
42–43	Gilad's Bodies in Motion	ESPN	1983	1994	
42–43	Gilad's Bodies in Motion	Fox Sports	1994	1995	
42–43	Gilad's Bodies in Motion	Discovery Health	1995	2004	
42–43	Gilad's Bodies in Motion	FitTV	2004	2011	
42–43	Gilad's Bodies in Motion	Discovery Fit & Health	2011	2015	
42	The Challenge	MTV	September 28, 1997	present	597
40	National Geographic Explorer	Nickelodeon	1985	1986	233
40	National Geographic Explorer	WTBS / TBS	1986	1999	233
40	National Geographic Explorer	CNBC	1999	2001	233
40	National Geographic Explorer	MSNBC	2001	2005	233
40	National Geographic Explorer	National Geographic	2005	present	233
41	Grand Ole Opry Live	TNN	April 20, 1985	August 2001	
41	Grand Ole Opry Live	CMT	August 2001	2003	
41	Grand Ole Opry Live	GAC	2003	2011	
41	Sunday NFL Countdown	ESPN	September 7, 1985	present	
38–39	College GameDay	ESPN	September 5, 1987	present	
38–39	NFL Primetime	ESPN	1987	present	
39	Biography	A&E	April 6, 1987	August 2006	
39	Biography	Biography Channel	August 2006	2012	
36	Baseball Tonight	ESPN	March 19, 1990	present	
36	Outside the Lines	ESPN	1990	present	
36	NBA on TNT	TNT	November 4, 1989	May 31, 2025	
35	Bobby Jones Gospel	BET	January 27, 1980	July 31, 2016	
34	WWE Raw	USA Network	January 11, 1993	September 18, 2000	1702
34	WWE Raw	TNN/Spike TV	September 25, 2000	September 26, 2005	1702
34	WWE Raw	USA Network	October 3, 2005	December 30, 2024	1702
34	WWE Raw	Netflix	January 6, 2025	present	1702
34	The Ultimate Fighter	Spike TV	January 17, 2005	December 3, 2011	150+ (including 23 live Ultimate Finales)
34	The Ultimate Fighter	FX	March 9, 2012	April 9, 2013	150+ (including 23 live Ultimate Finales)
34	The Ultimate Fighter	Fox Sports 1	September 4, 2013	2018	150+ (including 23 live Ultimate Finales)
34	The Ultimate Fighter	ESPN+	2021	present	150+ (including 23 live Ultimate Finales)
34	The Ultimate Fighter	TNT Sports	2023	present	150+ (including 23 live Ultimate Finales)
33	The Real World	MTV	May 21, 1992	January 4, 2017	614
33	The Real World	Facebook Watch	June 13, 2019	August 29, 2019	614
31	The Daily Show	Comedy Central	July 22, 1996	present	4,133
30	Power Rangers (original continuity) (Note: While the original continuity concluded in 2023, the franchise is still ongoing with a feature film developed by Paramount Pictures reported to be in development in December of 2024.)	Fox Kids	August 28, 1993	August 10, 2002	973
30	Power Rangers (original continuity)	ABC Kids	September 14, 2002	November 15, 2003	973
30	Power Rangers (original continuity)	Jetix (ABC Family)	February 14, 2004	July 10, 2005	973
30	Power Rangers (original continuity)	Jetix (Toon Disney)	July 16, 2005	November 14, 2005	973
30	Power Rangers (original continuity)	Jetix (ABC Family)	February 2, 2006		973
30	Power Rangers (original continuity)	Jetix (Toon Disney)	February 20, 2006	August 14, 2006	973
30	Power Rangers (original continuity)	Jetix (ABC Family)	August 20, 2006		973
30	Power Rangers (original continuity)	Jetix (Toon Disney)	September 18, 2006	November 3, 2008	973
30	Power Rangers (original continuity)	ABC Kids	March 7, 2009	August 28, 2010	973
30	Power Rangers (original continuity)	Nickelodeon	February 7, 2011	April 17, 2021	973
30	Power Rangers (original continuity)	Netflix	June 15, 2021	September 29, 2023	973
30	Moneyline	CNN	June 1, 1980	November 11, 2009	
29	South Park	Comedy Central	August 13, 1997	present	347
29	Real Sports with Bryant Gumbel	HBO	April 2, 1995	December 19, 2023	320
29	Barefoot Contessa	Food Network	November 30, 2002	December 19, 2021	297
28	The Sports Reporters	ESPN	October 2, 1988	May 7, 2017	
28	Your World with Neil Cavuto	Fox News Channel	October 7, 1996	January 17, 2025	
27	Fox & Friends	Fox News Channel	February 1, 1998	present	
26	ESPN SpeedWorld	ESPN	January 14, 1979	November 19, 2006	
25	Larry King Live	CNN	June 3, 1985	December 18, 2010	6,120
25	Pawn Stars	History Channel	July 19, 2009	present	686
25	Nick News	Nickelodeon	April 18, 1992	December 15, 2015	
25	Nick News	Nickelodeon	June 29, 2020	present	

=== 20–24 seasons ===
Number of seasons	Series	Network	First broadcast	Last broadcast	Number of episodes
24	ESPN Major League Baseball	ESPN / ESPN2	April 15, 1990	present	
24	Real Time with Bill Maher	HBO	February 21, 2003	present	739
24	WCW Saturday Night	WTCG/WTBS/TBS	December 17, 1976	August 19, 2000	
23	Crossfire	CNN	June 25, 1982	June 3, 2005	
23	Crossfire	CNN	September 9, 2013	August 6, 2014	
23	Inside the Actors Studio	Bravo	June 12, 1994	January 11, 2018	277
23	Inside the Actors Studio	Ovation	October 13, 2019	December 15, 2019	277
22	E! News	E!	September 1, 1991	September 25, 2025	7,500+
22	Deadliest Catch	Discovery Channel	April 12, 2005	present	385
21	Reliable Sources	CNN	March 7, 1992	August 21, 2022	
21	Modern Marvels	History	January 1, 1995	April 11, 2015	21
21	The O'Reilly Factor	Fox News Channel	October 7, 1996	April 19, 2017	5,321
	Around the Horn	ESPN	November 4, 2002	May 23, 2025	4,953
21	Sister Wives	TLC	September 26, 2010	present	269
21	Style with Elsa Klensch	CNN	June 1, 1980	January 2001	
20	The Real Housewives of Orange County	Bravo	March 21, 2006	present	363
20	NFL Matchup	ESPN / ESPN2	September 5, 1993	present	
20	Monday Night Countdown	ESPN	September 6, 1993	present	
20	Evans and Novak	CNN	September 1982	November 9, 2002	
20	Keeping Up with the Kardashians	E!	October 14, 2007	June 10, 2021	280 + 6 specials
20	Total Request Live	MTV	September 14, 1998	November 16, 2008	2,254
20	Total Request Live	MTV	October 2, 2017	2019	2,254

=== 15–19 seasons ===
Number of seasons	Series	Network	First broadcast	Last broadcast	Number of episodes
19	Squawk Box	CNBC	August 7, 1995	present	
19	ESPN Sunday Night Football	ESPN	November 8, 1987	January 1, 2006	
19	NASCAR on TBS	TBS	February 27, 1982	October 8, 2000	
18	SpongeBob SquarePants	Nickelodeon	May 1, 1999	present	346
18	It's Always Sunny in Philadelphia	FX	August 4, 2005	December 20, 2012	188
18	It's Always Sunny in Philadelphia	FXX	September 4, 2013	present	188
18	Golf Central	Golf Channel	January 17, 1995	present	
18	Showbiz Today	CNN	October 29, 1984	2002	
17	E! True Hollywood Story	E!	March 29, 1996	November 23, 2021	501
17	Fox News Live	Fox News	1999	February 24, 2008	
17	Fox News Live	Fox News	March 6, 2021	present	
17	WNBA on ESPN	ESPN	June 23, 1997	present	
17	Gold Rush	Discovery Channel	December 3, 2010	present	434
17	The Real Housewives of Atlanta	Bravo	October 7, 2008	present	368
17	MythBusters	Discovery Channel	September 23, 2003	March 5, 2016	296
17	MythBusters	Science Channel	November 15, 2017	February 28, 2018	296
17	USA Tuesday Night Fights	USA	October 1, 1982	August 25, 1998	
17	Capital Gang	CNN	September 7, 1988	2005	
16	NFL Films Game of the Week	ESPN	1997	December 29, 2007	
16	Hardball with Chris Matthews	America's Talking	1991	1996	
16	Hardball with Chris Matthews	CNBC	1997	1999	
16	Hardball with Chris Matthews	MSNBC	1999	February 28, 2020	
16	Booknotes	C-SPAN	April 2, 1989	December 5, 2004	801
16	MTV Unplugged	MTV	November 26, 1989	present	
16	Good Eats	Food Network	July 7, 1999	April 2, 2011	256
16	Good Eats	Food Network	August 25, 2019	July 6, 2020	256
16	Good Eats	Discovery+	February 18, 2021		256
16	Ghost Hunters	Sci Fi Channel / Syfy	October 6, 2004	October 26, 2016	251 (+ 12 specials not included)
16	Ghost Hunters	A&E	August 21, 2019	May 27, 2020	251 (+ 12 specials not included)
16	Ghost Hunters	Discovery+	October 31, 2021	March 19, 2022	251 (+ 12 specials not included)
16	Ghost Hunters	Travel Channel	October 1, 2022	May 25, 2023	251 (+ 12 specials not included)
15	Monday Night Countdown	ESPN	September 6, 1993	present	
15	Ninjago	Cartoon Network	January 14, 2011	October 25, 2020	210 (+4 pilot episodes, 1 special and several shorts)
15	Ninjago	Netflix	March 7, 2021	October 1, 2022	210 (+4 pilot episodes, 1 special and several shorts)

=== 12–14 seasons ===
Number of seasons	Series	Network	First broadcast	Last broadcast	Number of episodes
14	Forensic Files	TLC	April 23, 1996	December 29, 1999	406, including six hour-long specials
14	Forensic Files	Court TV	September 12, 2000	December 24, 2007	406, including six hour-long specials
14	Forensic Files	truTV	January 7, 2008	June 17, 2011	406, including six hour-long specials
14	Mystery Science Theater 3000	KTMA-TV	November 24, 1988	May 28, 1989	230
14	Mystery Science Theater 3000	The Comedy Channel	November 18, 1989	February 2, 1991	230
14	Mystery Science Theater 3000	Comedy Central	June 1, 1991	May 18, 1996	230
14	Mystery Science Theater 3000	Sci-Fi Channel	February 1, 1997	September 12, 1999	230
14	Mystery Science Theater 3000	Netflix	April 14, 2017	November 22, 2018	230
14	Mystery Science Theater 3000	Gizmoplex	May 6, 2022	December 16, 2022	230
14	An Evening at the Improv	A&E	February 3, 1982	January 1, 1996	
14	SpeedWeek	ESPN	1984	1997	
14	Video Soul	BET	June 26, 1983	September 1996	
14	Road Rules	MTV	July 19, 1995	September 27, 2004	
14	Xplay	ZDTV / TechTV	July 4, 1998	2004	1,378+
14	Xplay	G4techTV	2004	2005	1,378+
14	Xplay	G4	2005	2013	1,378+
14	Xplay	G4	2021	October 20, 2022	1,378+
14	NASCAR on TNT	TNT	July 22, 2001	July 13, 2014	
14	NASCAR on TNT	TNT	June 28, 2025	present	
14	Paw Patrol	Nickelodeon	August 12, 2013	present	311
13	Impractical Jokers	TruTV	December 15, 2011	August 4, 2022	295 (40+ specials)
13	Impractical Jokers	TBS	February 9, 2023	present	295 (40+ specials)
13	Below Deck	Bravo	July 1, 2013	present	196
13	American Horror Story	FX	October 5, 2011	present	145
13	When Calls the Heart	Hallmark Channel	October 19, 2013	present	141
13	Squidbillies	Adult Swim	October 16, 2005	December 12, 2021	132
13	Tim Russert	CNBC	1994	2008	
13	Private Screenings	TCM	1995	2010	28
13	Hannity & Colmes	Fox News Channel	October 7, 1996	January 9, 2009	
13	Gardening by the Yard	HGTV	1996	2009	
12	Monday Night Baseball	ESPN	April 7, 2002	present	
12	30 Minute Meals	Food Network	November 17, 2001	November 9, 2019	445+
12	BET's Top 25	BET	September 22, 2001	2008	
12	NASCAR on Speed	Speed	February 11, 2002	August 16, 2013	
12	90 Day Fiance	TLC	January 12, 2014	present	166
12	Southern Charm	Bravo	March 3, 2014	present	166
12	Aqua Teen Hunger Force	Adult Swim	September 9, 2001	August 30, 2015	139
12	Aqua Teen Hunger Force	Adult Swim	November 26, 2023	December 17, 2023	139
12	American Sports Cavalcade	TNN	1983	1995	
12	Intimate Portrait	Lifetime	November 14, 1993	October 3, 2005	271

=== 10–11 seasons ===
Number of seasons	Series	Network	First broadcast	Last broadcast	Number of episodes
11	Closing Bell	CNBC	February 4, 2002	present	
11	The Real Housewives of Potomac	Bravo	January 17, 2016	present	201
11	Shameless	Showtime	January 9, 2011	April 11, 2021	134
11	Shepard Smith Reporting	Fox News Channel	August 12, 2002	January 15, 2021	
11	House of Style	MTV	May 1989	2000	
11	House of Style	MTV	October 18, 2012		
11	Talk Soup	E!	December 26, 1991	May 17, 2002	
11	The Howard Stern Show	E!	June 18, 1994	July 8, 2005	1,550+
11	Robot Chicken	Adult Swim	February 20, 2005	April 11, 2022	220
11	All That	Nickelodeon	January 21, 1995	October 22, 2005	210
11	All That	Nickelodeon	June 15, 2019	December 17, 2020	210
11	Below Deck Mediterranean	Bravo	May 3, 2016	present	192
11	Imus in the Morning	MSNBC	September 2, 1996	April 11, 2007	
11	Paula's Home Cooking	Food Network	2002	2013	135+
11	On the Record	Fox News Channel	February 4, 2002	November 11, 2016	
10	NFL Total Access	NFL Network	2003	May 17, 2024	
10	American Morning	CNN	September 12, 2001	December 30, 2011	2,688
10	Emeril Live	Food Network	October 6, 1997	December 11, 2007	
10	Emeril Live	Fine Living	July 7, 2008	December 14, 2010	
10	The Fairly OddParents	Nickelodeon	March 30, 2001	November 25, 2006	172
10	The Fairly OddParents	Nickelodeon	February 18, 2008	September 16, 2016	172
10	The Fairly OddParents	Nicktoons	January 18, 2017	July 26, 2017	172
10	Nashville Now	TNN	March 7, 1983	October 15, 1993	
10	NASCAR on TNN	TNN	March 3, 1991	November 5, 2000	
10	Stargate SG-1	Showtime	July 27, 1997	May 17, 2002	215
10	Stargate SG-1	Sci Fi Channel	June 7, 2002	June 22, 2007	215
10	USA Up All Night	USA Network	January 7, 1989	March 7, 1998	900+
10	Weather Center	The Weather Channel	March 10, 1998	March 1, 2009	
10	The Loud House	Nickelodeon	May 2, 2016	present	316
10	Bar Rescue	Paramount Network	July 17, 2011	present	301
10	Adventure Time	Cartoon Network	April 5, 2010	September 3, 2018	283
10	Summer House	Bravo	January 9, 2017	present	155

== See also ==
- Lists of longest running American shows by broadcast type:
  - List of longest-running American television series
  - List of longest-running American broadcast network television series
  - List of longest-running American primetime television series
  - List of longest-running American first-run syndicated television series
- Lists of longest running shows internationally:
  - List of longest-running television shows by category- international list
  - List of longest-running British television series
  - List of longest-running Australian television series
- List of shortest running shows:
  - List of television series canceled after one episode
  - List of television series canceled before airing an episode
