= List of longest-running American television series =

This is a list of the longest-running American television series, ordered by number of years the show has been aired. This list includes only first-run series originating in North America and available throughout the United States via national broadcast networks, American cable networks, syndication, IPTV, video on demand or streaming television. Series continuations (with name changes and/or changes in network) are noted. Series broadcast within the United States but produced in other countries, such as Coronation Street (65 years) and Doctor Who (62 years) are not included.

Series shaded in light blue are currently in production.

== 60+ years ==
60 years or more
Length	Number of seasons	Series	Network	First broadcast	Last broadcast	Number of episodes	Notes
87 years	81 (through 2026 season)	NFL on NBC (Note: Originally GrandStand, then changed name to reflect year; was also NFL Live 1987–1997)	NBC	October 22, 1939	January 25, 1998	5,000+	GrandStand was the original name of the program. NBC originally carried many NFL games including the Pro Bowl. It later carried AFL/AFC games until 1997 when NBC lost its AFC contract to CBS. NBC later resumed its NFL coverage with NBC Sunday Night Football. It currently airs a Sunday night game every week and the NFL's kick-off games, along with the Super Bowl.
87 years	81 (through 2026 season)	NFL on NBC	NBC	August 6, 2006	present	5,000+	GrandStand was the original name of the program. NBC originally carried many NFL games including the Pro Bowl. It later carried AFL/AFC games until 1997 when NBC lost its AFC contract to CBS. NBC later resumed its NFL coverage with NBC Sunday Night Football. It currently airs a Sunday night game every week and the NFL's kick-off games, along with the Super Bowl.
79 years	77	Meet the Press (Note: Only its time on television is counted here; it began on radio (as American Mercury Presents: Meet the Press) in 1945) (NBC News)	NBC	November 6, 1947	present	4,946+	Longest-running show.
78 years	72	CBS Evening News (Note: CBS Television News 1948–1951, Douglas Edwards with the News 1951–1962, Walter Cronkite with the News 1962–1963) (CBS News)	CBS	May 3, 1948	present	16,400+	Longest-running network newscast.
77 years	77	Music & the Spoken Word (Note: Only its time on television is counted here; it began on radio July 15, 1929.)	Syndicated	October 1949	present	5,070 (as of November 15, 2026)	Longest-running non-news television program, the longest-running variety show, the longest-running religious television program, and the longest-running entertainment program in American television history.
74 years	69	Hallmark Hall of Fame (Note: Originally Hallmark Playhouse radio series, was Hallmark Television Playhouse (1951–1954))	NBC	December 24, 1951	December 17, 1978	260	Longest-running television anthology program, though not broadcast on a regular schedule, with only a limited number of productions per year.
74 years	69	Hallmark Hall of Fame	CBS	November 14, 1979	April 30, 1980	260	Longest-running television anthology program, though not broadcast on a regular schedule, with only a limited number of productions per year.
74 years	69	Hallmark Hall of Fame	PBS	February 9, 1981	May 6, 1981	260	Longest-running television anthology program, though not broadcast on a regular schedule, with only a limited number of productions per year.
74 years	69	Hallmark Hall of Fame	CBS	December 1, 1981	January 29, 1989	260	Longest-running television anthology program, though not broadcast on a regular schedule, with only a limited number of productions per year.
74 years	69	Hallmark Hall of Fame	ABC	April 30, 1989	April 23, 1995	260	Longest-running television anthology program, though not broadcast on a regular schedule, with only a limited number of productions per year.
74 years	69	Hallmark Hall of Fame	CBS	December 10, 1995	April 24, 2011	260	Longest-running television anthology program, though not broadcast on a regular schedule, with only a limited number of productions per year.
74 years	69	Hallmark Hall of Fame	ABC	November 27, 2011	April 20, 2014	260	Longest-running television anthology program, though not broadcast on a regular schedule, with only a limited number of productions per year.
74 years	69	Hallmark Hall of Fame	Hallmark Channel	November 30, 2014	present	260	Longest-running television anthology program, though not broadcast on a regular schedule, with only a limited number of productions per year.
74 years	74	Today (NBC News)	NBC	January 14, 1952	present	27,000+	Longest-running morning show.
74 years	2	The Victory Hour	WTVR	January 13, 1952	1966		Longest-running Christian television program
74 years	2	The Victory Hour	WWBT	1966	present		Longest-running Christian television program
73 years	69	Backyard Farmer	Nebraska Educational Telecommunications	June 1, 1953	present	1,380+	Longest-running show for home lawn and gardening (The show claims to be "the longest-running locally produced program in television history.")
73 years	73	ABC World News Tonight (Note: ABC Evening News 1953–1965 and 1967–1978; Peter Jennings and the News 1965–1967; World News Tonight 1978–2006; World News with Charles Gibson 2006–2009; ABC World News with Diane Sawyer 2009–2014)	ABC	September 1953	present	15,722+	
72 years	72	The Tonight Show (Note: There have been six major hosts during seven tenure periods.)	NBC	September 27, 1954	January 25, 1957	2,000 (before Carson) (Note: There were various other hosts for some short periods during the pre-Carson years. Please see the hosting history for further details.)	...Starring Steve Allen
72 years	72	The Tonight Show	NBC	July 29, 1957	March 30, 1962	2,000 (before Carson)	...Starring Jack Paar
72 years	72	The Tonight Show	NBC	October 1, 1962	May 22, 1992	6,714	...Starring Johnny Carson
72 years	72	The Tonight Show	NBC	May 25, 1992	May 29, 2009	3,775	...with Jay Leno
72 years	72	The Tonight Show	NBC	June 1, 2009	January 22, 2010	145 (1 not completed)	...with Conan O'Brien
72 years	72	The Tonight Show	NBC	March 1, 2010	February 6, 2014	835 (Note: The total number of episodes hosted by Jay Leno combined is 4,610.)	...with Jay Leno
72 years	72	The Tonight Show	NBC	February 17, 2014	present	2,371 (Note: The total number of episodes is13,359.)	...Starring Jimmy Fallon (Note: Hosted by Jimmy Fallon.)
72 years	58	The Wonderful World of Disney (Note: Disney anthology television series aired under a variety of titles, including Walt Disney's Disneyland, Walt Disney Presents, Walt Disney's Wonderful World of Color, Disney's Wonderful World, Walt Disney, The Disney Sunday Movie, and The Magical World of Disney. The current title is The Wonderful World of Disney. See the main article for a complete broadcast history)	ABC	October 27, 1954	June 11, 1961	2,207	Anthology television series featuring wide variety of topics ranging from Disney animation to live-action and documentaries. Walt Disney was the original host from show's inception until his death in 1966. From 1991 to 1997 and since 2008, the series only airs sporadically as a special presentation a few times a year.
72 years	58	The Wonderful World of Disney	NBC	September 24, 1961	August 16, 1981	2,207	Anthology television series featuring wide variety of topics ranging from Disney animation to live-action and documentaries. Walt Disney was the original host from show's inception until his death in 1966. From 1991 to 1997 and since 2008, the series only airs sporadically as a special presentation a few times a year.
72 years	58	The Wonderful World of Disney	CBS	September 26, 1981	September 24, 1983	2,207	Anthology television series featuring wide variety of topics ranging from Disney animation to live-action and documentaries. Walt Disney was the original host from show's inception until his death in 1966. From 1991 to 1997 and since 2008, the series only airs sporadically as a special presentation a few times a year.
72 years	58	The Wonderful World of Disney	ABC	February 1, 1986	May 21, 1988	2,207	Anthology television series featuring wide variety of topics ranging from Disney animation to live-action and documentaries. Walt Disney was the original host from show's inception until his death in 1966. From 1991 to 1997 and since 2008, the series only airs sporadically as a special presentation a few times a year.
72 years	58	The Wonderful World of Disney	NBC	October 8, 1988	August 26, 1990	2,207	Anthology television series featuring wide variety of topics ranging from Disney animation to live-action and documentaries. Walt Disney was the original host from show's inception until his death in 1966. From 1991 to 1997 and since 2008, the series only airs sporadically as a special presentation a few times a year.
72 years	58	The Wonderful World of Disney	CBS	September 26, 1991	December 1, 1996	2,207	Anthology television series featuring wide variety of topics ranging from Disney animation to live-action and documentaries. Walt Disney was the original host from show's inception until his death in 1966. From 1991 to 1997 and since 2008, the series only airs sporadically as a special presentation a few times a year.
72 years	58	The Wonderful World of Disney	ABC	September 28, 1997	December 24, 2008	2,207	Anthology television series featuring wide variety of topics ranging from Disney animation to live-action and documentaries. Walt Disney was the original host from show's inception until his death in 1966. From 1991 to 1997 and since 2008, the series only airs sporadically as a special presentation a few times a year.
72 years	58	The Wonderful World of Disney	ABC	December 12, 2015	present	2,207	Anthology television series featuring wide variety of topics ranging from Disney animation to live-action and documentaries. Walt Disney was the original host from show's inception until his death in 1966. From 1991 to 1997 and since 2008, the series only airs sporadically as a special presentation a few times a year.
72 years	58	The Wonderful World of Disney	Disney+	May 20, 2020	present	2,207	Anthology television series featuring wide variety of topics ranging from Disney animation to live-action and documentaries. Walt Disney was the original host from show's inception until his death in 1966. From 1991 to 1997 and since 2008, the series only airs sporadically as a special presentation a few times a year.
72 years	73	Face the Nation (CBS News)	CBS	November 7, 1954	present		
70 years	70	It Is Written	Syndicated	March 1, 1956	present		Longest-running religious television program to broadcast in color.
70 years	70	The Open Mind	Syndicated (Note: Normally to PBS stations.)	May 1956	present		Longest-running public television program.
70 years	68 (through 2026 season)	NFL on CBS	CBS	September 30, 1956	January 23, 1994	6,133	CBS originally broadcast NFL games from 1956 to its merger with the AFL in 1970. It continued to broadcast NFC regular and playoff games until 1994 when CBS lost the rights to broadcast these games to Fox. The network returned its football broadcasts by 1998 after CBS acquired the rights to broadcast AFC regular and playoff games from NBC. It also airs Super Bowl matches.
70 years	68 (through 2026 season)	NFL on CBS	CBS	September 6, 1998	present	6,133	CBS originally broadcast NFL games from 1956 to its merger with the AFL in 1970. It continued to broadcast NFC regular and playoff games until 1994 when CBS lost the rights to broadcast these games to Fox. The network returned its football broadcasts by 1998 after CBS acquired the rights to broadcast AFC regular and playoff games from NBC. It also airs Super Bowl matches.
69 years	12	To Tell the Truth	CBS	December 18, 1956	May 22, 1967	474	CBS Primetime
69 years	12	To Tell the Truth	CBS	June 18, 1962	September 6, 1968	1,625	CBS Daytime
69 years	9	To Tell the Truth	Syndicated	1969	1978	1,715	
69 years	1	To Tell the Truth	Syndicated	1980	1981	195	
69 years	1	To Tell the Truth	NBC	1990	1991	190	
69 years	2	To Tell the Truth	Syndicated	2000	2002		
69 years	3	To Tell the Truth	ABC	2016	April 26, 2022	86	
68–69 years	41	Divorce Court	Syndicated	1957	1962	5,767+	Broadcast in black and white from 1957 to 1962.
68–69 years	41	Divorce Court	Syndicated	1967	1969	5,767+	
68–69 years	41	Divorce Court	Syndicated	1984	1993	5,767+	
68–69 years	41	Divorce Court	Syndicated	September 15, 1999	present	5,767+	
66 years	58	CBS Sports Spectacular	CBS	January 3, 1960	present		
65 years	63 (through 2026 season)	The NFL Today	CBS	September 17, 1961	January 23, 1994		The pre-game show counterpart to NFL on CBS. Originally was 15 minutes long.
65 years	63 (through 2026 season)	The NFL Today	CBS	September 6, 1998	present		The pre-game show counterpart to NFL on CBS. Originally was 15 minutes long.
65 years	65	It's Academic	WRC-TV; WJZ-TV; WVIR-TV; WETA-TV	October 7, 1961	present		Longest-running game show of any type. Longest-running high school quiz show (broadcast in the Baltimore, Charlottesville, and Washington, D.C. areas only).
64 years	64	Professional Bowlers Tour (Note: Name often altered to reflect primary sponsor. Name on current broadcasts: Denny's PBA Tour)	ABC (Note: In addition, NBC televised the fall tour, 1984–1991)	January 27, 1962	June 21, 1997		ESPN airs some of the tours on ABC.
64 years	64	Professional Bowlers Tour	CBS	1998 (Note: 1998–2000 broadcast seasons were shared by CBS and ESPN)	1999		ESPN airs some of the tours on ABC.
64 years	64	Professional Bowlers Tour	Fox Sports	1999	2000		ESPN airs some of the tours on ABC.
64 years	64	Professional Bowlers Tour	ESPN	2000	present		ESPN airs some of the tours on ABC.
63 years	63	General Hospital (ABC Daytime)	ABC	April 1, 1963	present	16,000	Longest-running dramatic series (soap opera) still in production.
63 years	53 (Note: The show was off the air for two years.)	CBS Morning News	CBS	September 2, 1963	1979		This version of the program was replaced by CBS This Morning, and later by The Early Show. The program was on hiatus for two years, then retooled and reintroduced in 1982.
63 years	53	CBS Morning News	CBS	October 4, 1982	present		This version of the program was replaced by CBS This Morning, and later by The Early Show. The program was on hiatus for two years, then retooled and reintroduced in 1982.
62 years	29	Let's Make a Deal	NBC	December 30, 1963	December 27, 1968	3,200 (Note: Estimated)	Originally hosted by Monty Hall. Current host is Wayne Brady.
62 years	29	Let's Make a Deal	ABC	December 30, 1968	July 9, 1976	3,200	Originally hosted by Monty Hall. Current host is Wayne Brady.
62 years	29	Let's Make a Deal	Syndicated	1971	1977	281	Originally hosted by Monty Hall. Current host is Wayne Brady.
62 years	29	Let's Make a Deal	Syndicated	1980	1981	195	Originally hosted by Monty Hall. Current host is Wayne Brady.
62 years	29	Let's Make a Deal	Syndicated	1984	1986	340	Originally hosted by Monty Hall. Current host is Wayne Brady.
62 years	29	Let's Make a Deal	NBC	1990	1991	128	Originally hosted by Monty Hall. Current host is Wayne Brady.
62 years	29	Let's Make a Deal	NBC	2003	2003	3	Originally hosted by Monty Hall. Current host is Wayne Brady.
62 years	29	Let's Make a Deal	CBS	2009	present	1,500+	Originally hosted by Monty Hall. Current host is Wayne Brady.
62 years	47	Jeopardy!	NBC	March 30, 1964	January 3, 1975	2,753	Originally presented by Art Fleming.
62 years	47	Jeopardy!	Syndicated	September 1974	September 1975	39	Originally presented by Art Fleming.
62 years	47	Jeopardy!	NBC	October 2, 1978	March 2, 1979	108	Originally presented by Art Fleming.
62 years	47	Jeopardy!	Syndicated	September 10, 1984	present	7,000+	Originally presented by Alex Trebek. Currently presented by Ken Jennings.
61 years	61	Days of Our Lives (NBC Daytime)	NBC	November 8, 1965	September 9, 2022	15,000	
61 years	61	Days of Our Lives (NBC Daytime)	Peacock	September 12, 2022	present	15,000	
60 years	60	The 700 Club (Note: Aired locally on WYAH-TV Portsmouth, Virginia, 1966–1977; evolved from locally broadcast telethons 1962–1966)	Syndicated (Note: Simulcast with cable network transmission.)	April 1, 1966	present		
60 years	60	The 700 Club	CBN & Freeform	1977	present		

== 50–59 years ==
50 to 59 years
Length	Number of seasons	Series	Network	First broadcast	Last broadcast	Number of episodes	Notes
60 years	14 (NBC); 10 (Syndicated; 1971-1981); 3 (Syndication; 1986–1989); 6 (Syndication; 1998–2004); 2 (CBS)	Hollywood Squares	NBC	October 17, 1966	June 20, 1980	3,536	NBC Daytime
60 years	14 (NBC); 10 (Syndicated; 1971-1981); 3 (Syndication; 1986–1989); 6 (Syndication; 1998–2004); 2 (CBS)	Hollywood Squares	NBC	January 12, 1968	September 13, 1968		NBC Primetime
60 years	14 (NBC); 10 (Syndicated; 1971-1981); 3 (Syndication; 1986–1989); 6 (Syndication; 1998–2004); 2 (CBS)	Hollywood Squares	NBC	January 4, 1969	August 30, 1969	16	Saturday morning childrens' version titled The Storybook Squares
60 years	14 (NBC); 10 (Syndicated; 1971-1981); 3 (Syndication; 1986–1989); 6 (Syndication; 1998–2004); 2 (CBS)	Hollywood Squares	Syndicated	September 9, 1972	April 10, 1981		
60 years	14 (NBC); 10 (Syndicated; 1971-1981); 3 (Syndication; 1986–1989); 6 (Syndication; 1998–2004); 2 (CBS)	Hollywood Squares	NBC	October 31, 1983	July 27, 1984	192	NBC Daytime
60 years	14 (NBC); 10 (Syndicated; 1971-1981); 3 (Syndication; 1986–1989); 6 (Syndication; 1998–2004); 2 (CBS)	Hollywood Squares	Syndicated	September 15, 1986	June 16, 1989	585	
60 years	14 (NBC); 10 (Syndicated; 1971-1981); 3 (Syndication; 1986–1989); 6 (Syndication; 1998–2004); 2 (CBS)	Hollywood Squares	Syndicated	September 14, 1998	June 4, 2004	1,050	
60 years	14 (NBC); 10 (Syndicated; 1971-1981); 3 (Syndication; 1986–1989); 6 (Syndication; 1998–2004); 2 (CBS)	Hollywood Squares	CBS	January 16, 2025	Present	20	
59 years	58	Washington Week (Note: Originally Washington Week in Review. Currently airing as Washington Week with The Atlantic since August 11, 2023 after The Atlantic entered a partnership with the program.)	NET	February 23, 1967	1970	over 2,000	Longest-running PBS public television show, having started on its predecessor NET and carrying over to PBS, along with Mister Rogers' Neighborhood, Sesame Street, and others in 1970.
59 years	58	Washington Week	PBS	1970	present	over 2,000	Longest-running PBS public television show, having started on its predecessor NET and carrying over to PBS, along with Mister Rogers' Neighborhood, Sesame Street, and others in 1970.
57 years	57	Guiding Light (Note: Originally The Guiding Light. Only its time on television is counted here; it began on radio January 25, 1937.) (CBS Daytime)	CBS	June 30, 1952	September 18, 2009	15,762	Longest-running dramatic series (soap opera) of any genre. Longest-running daytime drama. While its television debut was on June 30, 1952, The Guiding Light's first incarnation was as a radio show, which premiered on January 25, 1937, giving the production a total runtime of 72 total years.
59 years	59	NFL Films Presents	Syndicated	September 17, 1967	January 26, 1997		
59 years	59	NFL Films Presents	ESPN	August 31, 1997	present		
59 years	59	NFL Films Presents	NFL Network	November 4, 2003	present		
58 years	58	60 Minutes (CBS News)	CBS	September 24, 1968	present	2,500+	
57 years	56	Sesame Street	NET	November 10, 1969	May 8, 1970	4,744 (Note: Season 44 (2013–2014) was the first time episodes were numbered in a seasonal order rather than the numerical and chronological fashion used since the show premiered. For example, episode 4401 means "the 1st episode of the 44th season", not "the 4,401st episode" (it is in fact the 4,328th episode).)	Longest-running children's show. (Note: This only applies to the time that a children's program has broadcast nationwide. Technically, a few other children's programs may have run longer in years/seasons than Sesame Street without being broadcast nationwide.) While Sesame Street remains on the PBS schedule, new episodes now premiere on HBO and become available to PBS nine months later. This also applied to (HBO) Max, starting from Season 51 when the show moved to (HBO) Max. Before season 55 aired, HBO announced its plans to terminate their partnership with Sesame Workshop, with Season 55 being the last to air on said streaming platform. Existing episodes will be available on HBO Max until 2027. Sesame Workshop found a new streaming platform for the deal, being Netflix. Starting with Season 56, new episodes will premiere on Netflix and air on PBS nine months later, just like with HBO.
57 years	56	Sesame Street	PBS (PBS Kids)	November 9, 1970	present	4,744	
57 years	56	Sesame Street	HBO	January 16, 2016	November 1, 2020	4,744	
57 years	56	Sesame Street	(HBO) Max	November 21, 2020	2025 (new episodes) 2027 (when existing episodes are removed)	4,744	
57 years	56	Sesame Street	Netflix	November 10, 2025	present	4,744	
56 years	51	Hour of Power	Syndicated	February 1970	present	2,662	
54 years	20	I've Got a Secret	CBS	June 19, 1952	April 3, 1967	CBS (1952–1967): 681; Syndication (1972–1973): 39; CBS (1976): 4 Oxygen (2000–2001): 120; GSN (2006): 40	Presented by Garry Moore and Steve Allen.
54 years	20	I've Got a Secret	Syndicated	September 11, 1972	September 9, 1973	CBS (1952–1967): 681; Syndication (1972–1973): 39; CBS (1976): 4 Oxygen (2000–2001): 120; GSN (2006): 40	Presented by Steve Allen.
54 years	20	I've Got a Secret	CBS	June 15, 1976	July 6, 1976	CBS (1952–1967): 681; Syndication (1972–1973): 39; CBS (1976): 4 Oxygen (2000–2001): 120; GSN (2006): 40	Presented by Bill Cullen.
54 years	20	I've Got a Secret	Oxygen	2000	2001	CBS (1952–1967): 681; Syndication (1972–1973): 39; CBS (1976): 4 Oxygen (2000–2001): 120; GSN (2006): 40	Presented by Stephanie Miller.
54 years	20	I've Got a Secret	GSN	April 17, 2006	June 9, 2006	CBS (1952–1967): 681; Syndication (1972–1973): 39; CBS (1976): 4 Oxygen (2000–2001): 120; GSN (2006): 40	Presented by Bil Dwyer.
54 years	54	As the World Turns (CBS Daytime)	CBS	April 2, 1956	September 17, 2010	13,858	
54 years	54 (through 2026 season)	Monday Night Baseball	NBC	1967	September 1, 1975		
54 years	54 (through 2026 season)	Monday Night Baseball	ABC	April 12, 1976	August 1, 1988		
54 years	54 (through 2026 season)	Monday Night Baseball	ESPN	2006	August 30, 2021		
56 years	57	NBC Nightly News (NBC News)	NBC	August 3, 1970	present		NBC has had an evening broadcast since 1948, starting with Camel News Caravan, lasting until 1956, when it was replaced by Nightly News' predecessor, the Huntley-Brinkley Report.
56 years	57 (through 2026 season)	Monday Night Football	ABC	September 21, 1970	December 26, 2005	1,000+	Since 2016 and 2018 respectively, ABC has simulcast ESPN's coverage of its NFL Wild Card playoff game and the Pro Bowl. In 2020, ABC simulcasted three select ESPN Monday Night Football games. Starting in 2021, ABC will get expanded broadcast rights, including exclusive games, Week 18 Saturday doubleheader simulcasts, and Super Bowl rights. Per NFL Policy, all games that are broadcast via cable or satellite television on a Pay TV Network must also be made available on over-the-air television stations in each participating team's local market.
56 years	57 (through 2026 season)	Monday Night Football	ESPN	September 11, 2006	present	1,000+	
56 years	57 (through 2026 season)	Monday Night Football	ABC	January 9, 2016	present	1,000+	
55 years	46	Masterpiece (Note: Originally Masterpiece Theatre.)	PBS	January 10, 1971	present		
53 years	53	Sábado Gigante	Univision	August 8, 1962	September 19, 2015	2,800+	Longest-running imported TV show.
52 years	36	NASCAR on ABC	ABC	February 26, 1961	August 5, 2000		
52 years	36	NASCAR on ABC	ESPN	March 10, 2007	October 11, 2014		
54 years	54	The Price Is Right (CBS Daytime) (Note: Originally The New Price Is Right; longest-running game show in American television history.)	CBS	September 4, 1972	present	10,000+ (as of 2025)	Longest-running game show to be broadcast nationally. Hosted by Bob Barker from 1972-2007. Current Host is Drew Carey. 100+ additional episodes have been produced for CBS primetime since 2002. Other versions produced for syndication are not included in the count.
54 years	51	Great Performances	PBS	November 4, 1972	present		
53 years	53	The Young and the Restless (CBS Daytime)	CBS	March 26, 1973	present	13,000	
52 years	53	Nova	PBS	March 3, 1974	present	1008 (February 11, 2026)	
51 years	16	Wheel of Fortune	NBC	January 6, 1975	June 30, 1989		Network version normally ran in the late morning. Originally hosted by Chuck Woolery (1975–1981), followed by Pat Sajak (1981–1989), Rolf Benirschke (1989), and Bob Goen (1989–1991).
51 years	16	Wheel of Fortune	CBS	July 17, 1989	January 11, 1991		Network version normally ran in the late morning. Originally hosted by Chuck Woolery (1975–1981), followed by Pat Sajak (1981–1989), Rolf Benirschke (1989), and Bob Goen (1989–1991).
51 years	16	Wheel of Fortune	NBC	January 14, 1991	September 20, 1991		Network version normally ran in the late morning. Originally hosted by Chuck Woolery (1975–1981), followed by Pat Sajak (1981–1989), Rolf Benirschke (1989), and Bob Goen (1989–1991).
51 years	40	Wheel of Fortune	Syndicated	September 19, 1983	present	8,000 (Note: As of June 7, 2024.)	Syndicated version normally runs in the evening. Second longest-running game show. Originally hosted by Pat Sajak (1983-2024), and currently hosted by Ryan Seacrest
51 years	52	Saturday Night Live (Note: Previously NBC's Saturday Night and Saturday Night Live '80)	NBC	October 11, 1975	present	1,014	The longest-running American sketch comedy show, and the second longest-running American variety show.
51 years	51	PBS NewsHour (Note: Previously The Robert MacNeil Report, The MacNeil/Lehrer Report, The MacNeil/Lehrer NewsHour, and The News Hour with Jim Lehrer)	PBS	October 20, 1975	present		Was hosted by Robert MacNeil (1975–1995) and Jim Lehrer (1976–2011).
51 years	50	Good Morning America	ABC	November 3, 1975	present	9,914+	
50 years	49–50	Austin City Limits	PBS	January 3, 1976	present	900	
50 years	50	Creative Living with Sheryl Borden	Syndicated	January 11, 1976	present		
50 years	43	Live from Lincoln Center	PBS	January 30, 1976	present (Note: Not currently on a regular schedule.)	251	
50 years	44 (Note: Total seasons (counting concurrent runs of the network and syndicated versions) as of the 2026–27 television season, consisting individually of 14 seasons for the network daytime version (nine on ABC, five on CBS) and 43 for the syndicated version (eight, 1976–85; seven, 1988–95; and 28, 1999–present).)	Family Feud	ABC	July 12, 1976	June 14, 1985	2,311	Hosted by Richard Dawson
50 years	44	Family Feud	Syndicated	September 19, 1977	May 17, 1985	976	Hosted by Richard Dawson
50 years	44	Family Feud	CBS	July 4, 1988	March 26, 1993		Hosted by Ray Combs
50 years	44	Family Feud	Syndicated	1988	May 26, 1995		Originally hosted by Ray Combs (1988–1994), followed by Richard Dawson (1994–1995).
50 years	44	Family Feud	Syndicated	September 20, 1999	present	2,390+	Originally hosted by Louie Anderson (1999–2002), Followed by Richard Karn (2002–2006), John O’Hurley (2006–2010), and Current Host Steve Harvey (2010–present)

== 40–49 years ==
40 to 49 years
Length	Number of seasons	Series	Network	First broadcast	Last broadcast	Number of episodes	Notes
48 years	48	Day of Discovery	Syndicated	May 5, 1968	February 6, 2016		
48 years	34	Mutual of Omaha's Wild Kingdom	NBC	January 6, 1963	April 11, 1971		Wild Kingdom was on hiatus 1988-2002 and ultimately was cancelled in 2011. The original host, Marlin Perkins, died in 1986.
48 years	34	Mutual of Omaha's Wild Kingdom	Syndicated	1971	1988		Wild Kingdom was on hiatus 1988-2002 and ultimately was cancelled in 2011. The original host, Marlin Perkins, died in 1986.
48 years	34	Mutual of Omaha's Wild Kingdom	Animal Planet	September 17, 2002	May 22, 2011.		Wild Kingdom was on hiatus 1988-2002 and ultimately was cancelled in 2011. The original host, Marlin Perkins, died in 1986.
47 years	16	The Joker's Wild	CBS	September 4, 1972	June 13, 1975	3,026	
47 years	16	The Joker's Wild	Syndicated (Note: Syndicated revival prompted by success of syndicated repeats of CBS episodes in 1976)	September 5, 1977	May 23, 1986	3,026	
47 years	16	The Joker's Wild	Syndicated	September 10, 1990	March 8, 1991	3,026	
47 years	16	The Joker's Wild	TBS	October 24, 2017	2018	3,026	
47 years	16	The Joker's Wild	TNT	2018	March 27, 2019	3,026	
49 years	41	Inside the NFL	HBO	September 14, 1977	February 6, 2008		Len Dawson and Nick Buoniconti hosted the show together 1978–2001.
49 years	41	Inside the NFL	Showtime	September 10, 2008	February 24, 2021		Len Dawson and Nick Buoniconti hosted the show together 1978–2001.
49 years	41	Inside the NFL	Paramount+	September 7, 2021	April 5, 2023		Len Dawson and Nick Buoniconti hosted the show together 1978–2001.
49 years	41	Inside the NFL	The CW	September 9, 2023	present		Len Dawson and Nick Buoniconti hosted the show together 1978–2001.
47 years	45	Jerry Lewis MDA Telethon (Note: Jerry Lewis died in 2017.)	Syndicated, ABC	September 4, 1966	August 31, 2014	45	Annual broadcast; was broadcast as a two-hour special on ABC in 2013 and 2014.
48 years	48	20/20 (ABC News)	ABC	June 6, 1978	present	500+	Long time hosts were Hugh Downs (1978–99) and Barbara Walters (1979–2004, 2013–14).
45 years	37	Wide World of Sports (ABC Sports)	ABC	April 29, 1961	August 2006 (Note: Weekly broadcasts ended January 1, 1997; irregular airings afterward; officially ended with the absorption of ABC Sports into ESPN)		
45 years	45	Agronsky & Co./Inside Washington	Syndicated (Note: Primarily to public television.)	1969	December 20, 2013		
45 years	45	One Life to Live (ABC Daytime)	ABC	July 15, 1968	January 13, 2012	11,136	
45 years	27	In Touch with Dr. Charles Stanley	Syndicated	1978	present		
47 years	48	CBS News Sunday Morning	CBS	January 28, 1979	present		Originally hosted by Charles Kuralt (1979–1994), followed by Charles Osgood (1994–2016), and Jane Pauley (2016–present).
47 years	47	This Old House	PBS	February 20, 1979	present	1,196	Originally hosted by Bob Vila until 1989.
47 years	48	SportsCenter	ESPN, ESPN2, ESPNews	September 7, 1979	present	60,000+	
46 years	38	Nightline (Note: Evolved from The Iran Crisis – America Held Hostage (1979–80).)	ABC	March 24, 1980	present		Hosted by Ted Koppel (1980-2005).
46 years	36	Washington Journal (Note: Weekend editions are simulcast on the BBC Parliament channel with the name America This Week)	C-SPAN	October 7, 1980	present		
45 years	35	Noticiero Univision (Note: Originally titled Noticiero SIN when Univision was known as SIN (Spanish International Network).)	Univision	June 1, 1981	present		
45 years	45	Entertainment Tonight	Syndicated	September 14, 1981	present	11,675	Longest-running entertainment news program.
45 years	43	MotorWeek (Note: Also syndicated, 1982–present)	PBS	October 15, 1981	present		
45 years	41	This Week (Note: Succeeded Issues and Answers; full title throughout its run is This Week With (host's name), beginning with David Brinkley, 1981–1996. Cokie Roberts and Sam Donaldson co-anchored from 1996–2002. George Stephanopoulos was host from 2002 to 2010. Christiane Amanpour took over as host in 2010.)	ABC	November 15, 1981	present		Originally hosted by David Brinkley (1981–1996), currently hosted by George Stephanopoulos (2002-2010, 2012–present).
44 years	38	Late Night (Note: Late Night, as an entity, is in its 38th season. Over that period it has had four hosts, listed in the notes column.)	NBC	February 1, 1982	June 21, 1993	1,819	...with David Letterman
44 years	38	Late Night	NBC	September 13, 1993	February 20, 2009	2,725	...with Conan O'Brien
44 years	38	Late Night	NBC	March 2, 2009	February 7, 2014	969	...with Jimmy Fallon
44 years	38	Late Night	NBC	February 24, 2014	present	1,854 (Note: The total number of episodes, for each host all combined, is 6,298, as at January 21, 2019.)	...with Seth Meyers
44 years	12	Wild America	PBS, Syndicated	September 14, 1982	present	120	Hosted by Marty Stouffer.
44 years	44	Nature	PBS	October 10, 1982	present	671 (December 18, 2025)	
41 years	41	Romper Room (Note: Was available to stations in both franchised and syndicated versions as Romper Room from 1953 to 1981; was retitled Romper Room & Friends in 1981 and became a syndicated-only series as the local versions ended production)	Syndicated	February 9, 1953	September 1994		
41 years	42	All My Children (ABC Daytime)	ABC	January 5, 1970	September 23, 2011	ABC: 10,712 (television); TOLN: 43 (internet and television); Total: 10,755	While the show had ceased airing as a television series it was still in production for a brief time after. On April 29, 2013, the show had resumed airing now as a web series on the internet and could be seen through Hulu, iTunes, and YouTube until September 2, 2013, before being confirmed as being discontinued again on November 11, 2013.
41 years	32 (Note: 38 (12 original, 26 revival))	The People's Court	Syndicated	September 14, 1981	May 17, 1993 (Note: Show went on hiatus from 1993 to 1997.)	2,484	Judged by Joseph Wapner.
41 years	32	The People's Court	Syndicated	September 8, 1997 (Note: Show was on hiatus from 1993 to 1997.)	1999	1,500+	Judged by Ed Koch, former mayor of New York City.
41 years	32	The People's Court	Syndicated	1999	2001	1,500+	Judged by Jerry Sheindlin, the husband of Judy Sheindlin of Judge Judy.
41 years	32	The People's Court	Syndicated	2001	July 21, 2023	1,500+	Judged by Marilyn Milian.
42–43 years	31	Gilad's Bodies in Motion	ESPN	1983	1994		
42–43 years	31	Gilad's Bodies in Motion	Fox Sports	1994	1995		
42–43 years	31	Gilad's Bodies in Motion	Discovery Health	1995	2004		
42–43 years	31	Gilad's Bodies in Motion	FitTV	2004	2011		
42–43 years	31	Gilad's Bodies in Motion	Discovery Life	2011	2015		
42–43 years	31	Gilad's Bodies in Motion	JLTV	2015	present		
43 years	43	Frontline	PBS	January 17, 1983	present	842	
40 years	40	Nightly Business Report (Note: Broadcast locally only on WPBT, 1979–1981)	PBS	January 22, 1979	December 27, 2019	10,680	
40 years	40	NASCAR on CBS	CBS	February 12, 1960	July 15, 2000		
40 years	40	The Bugs Bunny Show	ABC (1960–1968, 1986–2000), CBS (1968–1985)	October 11, 1960	September 2, 2000	1040 (including at least 5,000 total shorts being aired, although many were reruns)	Longest-running cartoon program on broadcast television, the last non-Disney ABC Kids show, and the last non-Educational and Informational (E/I) Saturday morning cartoon on broadcast TV.
42 years	32	Real Videos	TBN, JCTV	October 4, 1984	present	900+	
41 years	29	National Geographic Explorer (Note: Host: Tom Chapin (1985–1988), Robert Urich (1988–1995), Robert Ballard (1988–1995), Boyd Matson (1995–2003), Michael Fay (2001), Lisa Ling (2003–))	Nickelodeon	April 7, 1985	1986	233	
41 years	29	National Geographic Explorer	TBS	1986	1999	233	
41 years	29	National Geographic Explorer	CNBC	1999	2001	233	
41 years	29	National Geographic Explorer	MSNBC (Note: Show renamed National Geographic Ultimate Explorer 2003–2005)	2001	2005	233	
41 years	29	National Geographic Explorer	National Geographic	2005	present	233	

== 35–39 years ==
35 to 39 years
Length	Number of seasons	Series	Network	First broadcast	Last broadcast	Number of episodes	Notes
41 years	31	Grand Ole Opry Live (Note: Oldest continuously running radio program, airing on WSM radio, Nashville, Tennessee)	TNN	April 20, 1985	August 2001		
41 years	31	Grand Ole Opry Live	CMT	August 2001	2003		
41 years	31	Grand Ole Opry Live	GAC (Note: As Grand Ole Opry Live!)	2003	2015		
38 years	37	The Woodwright's Shop (Note: Broadcast only in North Carolina, 1979–1981)	PBS	1979	2017	468	
40 years	40	American Masters	PBS	June 22, 1986	present	288	
37 years	37	American Bandstand	WFIL-TV	October 7, 1952	October 7, 1957	3,002	Hosted by Dick Clark (1956–1989).
37 years	37	American Bandstand	ABC	October 7, 1957	September 5, 1987	3,002	Hosted by Dick Clark (1956–1989).
37 years	37	American Bandstand	Syndicated	September 19, 1987	June 4, 1988	3,002	Hosted by Dick Clark (1956–1989).
37 years	37	American Bandstand	USA	April 8, 1989	October 7, 1989	3,002	Hosted by Dick Clark (1956–1989).
37 years	35	The McLaughlin Group	Syndicated	January 1, 1982	August 19, 2016		The show ended its run when John McLaughlin died in 2016, but was then revived in 2018 with new host Tom Rogan.
37 years	35	The McLaughlin Group	Syndicated	January 7, 2018	December 30, 2018		
37 years	35	The McLaughlin Group	Syndicated	September 6, 2019	December 25, 2020		
38–39 years	27	NFL Primetime	ESPN	1987	present		
39 years	31	The Bold and the Beautiful	CBS	March 23, 1987	present	9,000	
39 years	29	Biography (Note: Originated on CBS)	A&E	April 6, 1987 (Note: Reran CBS originals, 1984–1987)	August 2006		The show was cancelled in 2012, and later revived in 2017.
39 years	29	Biography	Biography Channel (Note: Now called FYI.)	August 2006	present (Note: Rebroadcast A&E originals, 1999–2006)		The show was cancelled in 2012, and later revived in 2017.
39 years	27	College GameDay (football series)	ESPN	September 1987	present		
38 years	39	48 Hours (Note: Also called 48 Hours Investigates)	CBS	January 2, 1988	present	1,494	
38 years	28	America's Most Wanted	Fox	February 7, 1988	April 21, 2012	1,192	
38 years	28	America's Most Wanted	Lifetime	December 2, 2011	October 12, 2012	1,192	
38 years	28	America's Most Wanted	Fox	March 15, 2021	present	1,192	
38 years	37	POV	PBS	July 5, 1988	present	400+	
38 years	39	Live with Kelly and Mark (Note: Other names: Live with Regis and Kathie Lee (1988–2000), Live with Regis (2000–2001), Live with Regis and Kelly (2001–2011), Live with Kelly and Michael (2012–2016), Live with Kelly and Ryan (2017–2013).)	Syndicated	September 5, 1988 (Note: Date of first episode distributed nationally; was aired by WABC locally at The Morning Show, 1983–1988)	present	7,580	
38 years	37	American Experience	PBS	October 1, 1988	present	388	
38 years	27	NBA on TNT	TNT	October 30, 1988	present		
37 years	14	Mystery Science Theater 3000	KTMA-TV	November 24, 1988	May 28, 1989	232	Was on hiatus from 1999 to 2017.
37 years	14	Mystery Science Theater 3000	The Comedy Channel	November 18, 1989	February 2, 1991	232	Was on hiatus from 1999 to 2017.
37 years	14	Mystery Science Theater 3000	Comedy Central	June 1, 1991	May 18, 1996	232	Was on hiatus from 1999 to 2017.
37 years	14	Mystery Science Theater 3000	Sci Fi Channel	February 1, 1997	September 12, 1999	232	Was on hiatus from 1999 to 2017.
37 years	14	Mystery Science Theater 3000	Netflix	April 14, 2017	November 22, 2018	232	Was on hiatus from 1999 to 2017.
37 years	14	Mystery Science Theater 3000	Gizmoplex	May 6, 2022 (Note: Pre-release date, March 4, 2022)	present	232	Was on hiatus from 1999 to 2017.
37 years	37	Inside Edition	Syndicated	January 9, 1989	present	11,257+	
37 years	38	Cops	Fox	March 11, 1989	May 4, 2013	1,279	Cancelled during national protests following the murder of George Floyd by an on-duty police officer of the Minneapolis Police Department.
37 years	38	Cops	Spike / Paramount Network	September 14, 2013	May 11, 2020	1,279	Cancelled during national protests following the murder of George Floyd by an on-duty police officer of the Minneapolis Police Department.
37 years	38	Cops	Fox Nation	October 1, 2021	present	1,279	Cancelled during national protests following the murder of George Floyd by an on-duty police officer of the Minneapolis Police Department.
35 years	10	Columbo	NBC	February 20, 1968	May 13, 1978	69	Was on hiatus from 1978 to 1989, during the change in broadcast networks.
35 years	10	Columbo	ABC	February 6, 1989	January 30, 2003	69	Was on hiatus from 1978 to 1989, during the change in broadcast networks.
35 years	35	Another World (NBC Daytime)	NBC	May 4, 1964	June 25, 1999	8,891	Longest-running continuous title sequences on television.
35 years	35	Bobby Jones Gospel	BET	January 27, 1980	July 31, 2016		
35 years	35	Soul Train	Syndicated	October 2, 1971	March 25, 2006 (Note: Date of airing of last first-run episode. Since then, reruns have been syndicated as Best of Soul Train)	1,117	
35 years	35	Wall Street Week (Note: Became Wall Street Week with Fortune after original host was fired in 2002) (Note: Louis Rukeyser died in 2006.)	PBS	November 20, 1970	June 24, 2005		Since 2020, a new version of the program is now airing on Bloomberg Television. (Note: Current host is David Westin.)
35 years	36	The Victory Garden (Note: Known as Jim Crockett's Victory Garden from 1975 to 1979)	PBS	April 16, 1975	2010		
36 years	37	America's Funniest Home Videos	ABC	November 26, 1989	present	844	
36 years	38	The Simpsons (Note: Only its time as its own show is counted here; it began on The Tracey Ullman Show as animated shorts. It is currently the longest-running primetime entertainment program with a consistent setting and recurring characters. While other primetime shows have run longer, they are all news, sports, anthology or variety programs.)	Fox	January 14, 1990 (Note: Sneak peek airing December 17, 1989)	present	816	Longest-running American animated series, longest-running American sitcom, and the longest-running scripted primetime series.
36 years	37 (through 2026 season)	Baseball Tonight	ESPN	March 19, 1990	present		
36 years	27	ESPN Major League Baseball (Note: Includes Sunday Night Baseball, Wednesday Night Baseball, etc.)	ESPN, ESPN2 (Note: ESPN2 started broadcasting major league baseball games in 2002 in addition to those offered by ESPN)	April 15, 1990	present		
36 years	26	Law & Order	NBC	September 13, 1990	May 24, 2010	550	
36 years	26	Law & Order	NBC	February 24, 2022	present	550	
36 years	19 (Note: Original series ran for 15 seasons, four seasons of the revival.)	NBA Inside Stuff	NBC	October 27, 1990	August 31, 2002		Was on hiatus from 2006 to 2013.
36 years	19	NBA Inside Stuff	ABC	September 7, 2002	January 15, 2006		Was on hiatus from 2006 to 2013.
36 years	19	NBA Inside Stuff	NBA TV	November 2, 2013	present		Was on hiatus from 2006 to 2013.
32 years	32	Outside the Lines	ESPN	May 7, 1990	August 13, 2022		Continues as occasional segments of SportsCenter

== 30–34 years ==
30 to 34 years
Length	Number of seasons	Series	Network	First broadcast	Last broadcast	Number of episodes	Notes
34 years	34	Evening at Pops	PBS	July 12, 1970	August 29, 2004		
34 years		Rapid T. Rabbit and Friends	Syndicated	February 21, 1983	April 28, 2017	780	
33 years	31	Mister Rogers' Neighborhood	NET	February 19, 1968	May 1, 1970	912 (including specials)	Fred Rogers died in 2003 due to a digestive cancer.
33 years	31	Mister Rogers' Neighborhood	PBS	February 15, 1971	August 31, 2001	912 (including specials)	Fred Rogers died in 2003 due to a digestive cancer.
33 years	24	Concentration	NBC	August 25, 1958	March 23, 1973	3,770	Presented by Hugh Downs and Bob Clayton.
33 years	24	Concentration	Syndicated	September 10, 1973	September 8, 1978	975	Presented by Jack Narz.
33 years	24	Concentration	NBC	May 4, 1987	September 20, 1991	1,020	Presented by Alex Trebek.
33 years	34 (first incarnation)	Firing Line	Syndicated	April 4, 1966 (Note: Pilot taped April 4, 1966)	1971	1,504 (first incarnation)	Longest-running public affairs program to have a single host.
33 years	34 (first incarnation)	Firing Line	PBS	1971	December 26, 1999	1,504 (first incarnation)	Longest-running public affairs program to have a single host.
33 years	18	CBS This Morning	CBS	November 30, 1987	October 29, 1999	3,110	
33 years	18	CBS This Morning	CBS	January 9, 2012	September 6, 2021	2,521	
35 years	35	E! News (Note: Previously E! News Daily and E! News Live)	E!	September 1, 1991	present	7,500+	
35 years	35	Maury	Syndicated	September 9, 1991	September 8, 2022	5,545	Presented by Maury Povich.
32 years	24	Crossfire	CNN	1982	June 3, 2005		Was on hiatus from 2005 to 2013.
32 years	24	Crossfire	CNN	September 9, 2013	October 15, 2014		Was on hiatus from 2005 to 2013.
34 years	34	Reliable Sources	CNN	March 7, 1992	August 21, 2022		
34 years	34	Dateline NBC (Note: Also known as Dateline (day of week it airs), Dateline with Stone Phillips)	NBC	March 31, 1992	present		
34 years		To the Contrary	PBS	April 1, 1992	present		
34 years	25 (Note: Original series ran for 21 seasons, four seasons of the revival.)	Nick News (Note: Previously Nick News W/5 and Nick News with Linda Ellerbee)	Nickelodeon	April 18, 1992	December 15, 2015		Nickelodeon's longest-running series
34 years	25	Nick News	Nickelodeon	June 29, 2020	present		Nickelodeon's longest-running series
33 years	33	WWE Raw	USA Network	January 11, 1993	September 18, 2000	1747	Longest-running professional wrestling program on national television.
33 years	33	WWE Raw	TNN / Spike (Note: Now called Paramount Network.)	September 25, 2000	September 26, 2005	1747	Longest-running professional wrestling program on national television.
33 years	33	WWE Raw	USA Network	October 3, 2005	December 30, 2024	1747	Longest-running professional wrestling program on national television.
33 years	33	WWE Raw	Netflix	January 6, 2025	present	1747	Longest-running professional wrestling program on national television.
33 years	34	The Late Show	CBS	August 30, 1993	May 20, 2015	4,262	...with David Letterman
33 years	34	The Late Show	CBS	September 8, 2015	May 21, 2026	1,801	...with Stephen Colbert
33 years	33	NFL Matchup	ESPN, ESPN2 (Note: Presently, each episode first airs on ESPN2 on Fridays, then is repeated on ESPN two days later.)	September 5, 1993	present	Produced by NFL Films.	
33 years	33	Monday Night Countdown	ESPN	September 6, 1993	present		
33 years	22	Entertainers with Byron Allen (Note: Originally Entertainers)	Syndicated	September 30, 1993	present		
31 years	29	This Week in Baseball	Syndicated	April 1, 1977	September 26, 1998		The program was on hiatus 1998–2000. Original version hosted by Mel Allen (1977–1996), Warner Fusselle (1996), and Ozzie Smith (1997–1998)
31 years	29	This Week in Baseball	Fox	April 8, 2000	September 24, 2011		The program was on hiatus 1998–2000. Original version hosted by Mel Allen (1977–1996), Warner Fusselle (1996), and Ozzie Smith (1997–1998)
31 years	31	Faith for Today (Note: Also Westbrook Hospital, 1975–1981)	ABC	May 21, 1950	1955		
31 years	31	Faith for Today	Syndicated	1955	1981		
31 years	31	Lamp Unto My Feet	CBS	1948	1979		
30 years	30	NASCAR on ESPN	ESPN	1981	2002		
30 years	30	NASCAR on ESPN	ESPN	2007	2014		
30 years	10	Roseanne	ABC	October 18, 1988	May 22, 2018	231	Was on hiatus 1997–2018.
30 years	11	Murphy Brown	CBS	November 14, 1988	December 20, 2018	260	Was on hiatus 1998–2018.
30 years	35	Search for Tomorrow (CBS & NBC Daytime)	CBS	September 3, 1951	March 23, 1982	9,130	
30 years	35	Search for Tomorrow (CBS & NBC Daytime)	NBC	March 26, 1982	December 26, 1986	9,130	
30 years	30	Power Rangers (original continuity) (Note: While the original continuity concluded in 2023, the franchise is still ongoing with a feature film developed by Paramount Pictures reported to be in development in December of 2024.) (Note: While the show takes place in the same fictional universe for its entire run, it is often renamed on a yearly basis as the central location, theme, and characters change almost completely on a season-by-season basis.)	Fox (Fox Kids) (Note: In select markets was aired on another station other than Fox; such as independent stations, UPN or The WB (see Fox Kids broadcasting ambiguities).)	August 28, 1993	August 10, 2002	973 (Note: Also see List of Power Rangers episodes.)	Longest-running United States Tokusatsu series. (Note: Costumes and footage loosely adapted from Super Sentai.)
30 years	30	Power Rangers (original continuity)	ABC (ABC Kids)	September 14, 2002	November 15, 2003	973	Longest-running United States Tokusatsu series.
30 years	30	Power Rangers (original continuity)	ABC Family (Jetix)	February 14, 2004	July 16, 2005	973	Longest-running United States Tokusatsu series.
30 years	30	Power Rangers (original continuity)	Toon Disney (Jetix)	July 25, 2005	November 3, 2008	973	Longest-running United States Tokusatsu series.
30 years	30	Power Rangers (original continuity)	ABC (ABC Kids)	March 7, 2009	August 28, 2010	973	Longest-running United States Tokusatsu series.
30 years	30	Power Rangers (original continuity)	Nickelodeon	February 7, 2011	December 18, 2021	973	Longest-running United States Tokusatsu series.
30 years	30	Power Rangers (original continuity)	Netflix	March 3, 2022	September 29, 2023	973	Longest-running United States Tokusatsu series.
31–32 years	22	Kickin' It with Byron Allen (Note: Evolved from Jammin' (1991–1994))	Syndicated	1994	present		
32 years	33 (through 2026 season)	NFL on Fox	Fox	August 12, 1994	present		Fox currently holds rights to NFC matches, the NFC Playoffs as well as select Super Bowl matches since Super Bowl XXXI where it rotates with other broadcasters. It has also aired Thursday Night Football Matches from 2018 to 2022 where it shares the rights with some matches with Amazon Prime Video and the NFL Network.
32 years	23	Inside the Actors Studio	Bravo	August 14, 1994	present	277	
32 years	32	Extra (Note: Originally Extra: The Entertainment Magazine)	Syndicated	September 5, 1994	present	9,054	
32 years	33 (through 2026 season)	Fox NFL Sunday	Fox	September 18, 1994	present		
31 years	23	Golf Central	Golf Channel	January 17, 1995	present		
31 years	29	Real Sports with Bryant Gumbel	HBO	April 2, 1995	present		
31 years	31	Squawk Box	CNBC	August 7, 1995	present		
30 years	28	Fox News Sunday	Fox (Note: Is repeated in the afternoon of the same day on Fox News Channel)	April 28, 1996	present	1,476	Hosted by Tony Snow (1996–2003), Chris Wallace (2003–2021), and Shannon Bream (2022–present)
30 years	31 (through 2026 season)	MLB on Fox	Fox	June 1, 1996	present		
30 years	25	The Daily Show	Comedy Central	July 22, 1996	present	4,169	Hosted by Craig Kilborn (1996–98), Jon Stewart (1999–2015, 2024- ), Trevor Noah (2015–2022) and others.

== 25–29 years ==
25 to 29 years
Length	Number of seasons	Series	Network	First broadcast	Last broadcast	Number of episodes	Notes
29 years	29	Captain Kangaroo (Note: Reruns aired in syndication, 1984–1992)	CBS	October 3, 1955	December 8, 1984	6,090	Bob Keeshan died in 2004.
29 years	29	Lou Dobbs Tonight (Note: Began as Moneyline. Became Lou Dobbs Moneyline in 2001, Lou Dobbs Tonight in 2003)	CNN	June 1, 1980	November 11, 2009		
29 years	29	Lilias, Yoga and You (Note: Local transmission only (WCET), 1972–1996)	PBS	1976	1999	500	
29 years	29	Hometime	PBS	November 1, 1986	January 30, 2016		
29 years	29	The Sports Reporters (Note: Alternate title ESPN Magazine's The Sports Reporters)	ESPN (Note: Program rebroadcast later the same day on ESPNews)	October 9, 1988	May 7, 2017		Revived in 2024 on ESPN's YouTube channel
29 years	29	The David Susskind Show (Note: Originally Open End; prior to syndication, aired on WNTA-TV 1958–1961)	Syndicated	1961	1987		David Susskind died in 1987.
28 years	28	WCW Saturday Night (Note: Broadcast locally on WQXI in 1971 and moved to WTBS starting in 1972. Went national when WTBS launched their satellite feed in 1976. Began as Georgia Championship Wrestling in 1971. Became World Championship Wrestling in 1981 and WCW Saturday Night in 1992. Ended as WCW Saturday Morning in 2000.)	TBS	December 25, 1971	August 19, 2000		
28 years	23 (Note: Tom Snyder hosted for 4 seasons, Craig Kilborn for 5, Craig Ferguson 10 for and James Corden for 9)	The Late Late Show (Note: Host: Tom Snyder 1995–1999, Craig Kilborn 1999–2004, Craig Ferguson 2004–2014, James Corden 2015–present.)	CBS	January 9, 1995	March 26, 1999	777	...with Tom Snyder
28 years	23	The Late Late Show	CBS	March 29, 1999	August 27, 2004	1,190	...with Craig Kilborn
28 years	23	The Late Late Show	CBS	September 20, 2004	December 31, 2004	79	Hosted by guest hosts.
28 years	23	The Late Late Show	CBS	January 3, 2005	December 19, 2014	2,058	...with Craig Ferguson
28 years	23	The Late Late Show	CBS	January 5, 2015	March 20, 2015	45	Hosted by guest hosts.
28 years	23	The Late Late Show	CBS	March 23, 2015	April 27, 2023	1,197 (Note: The total number of episodes, for each host all combined, is 4,733 as at January 24, 2019.)	...with James Corden
28 years	28	The Phil Donahue Show (Note: Originally The Phil Donahue Show)	Syndicated	November 6, 1967	September 13, 1996	6,715	
28 years	28	The Edge of Night	CBS	April 2, 1956	November 28, 1975	7,420	
28 years	28	The Edge of Night	ABC	December 1, 1975	December 28, 1984	7,420	
28 years	29	Love of Life	CBS	September 24, 1951	February 1, 1980	7,315	
28 years	26	Hee Haw (Note: Renamed "The Hee Haw Show" for 1991–92 season, and Hee Haw Silver for 1992–1993 season ("greatest hits"))	CBS	June 15, 1969	February 23, 1971	655	
28 years	26	Hee Haw	Syndicated	September 18, 1971	June 26, 1993	655	
28 years	26	Hee Haw	TNN	November 23, 1996	December 27, 1997	655	
28 years	28	ESPN SpeedWorld	ESPN	1979	2006		
28 years	28	Mystery! (Note: Started in 2008, Mystery! was absorbed into Masterpiece (the former Masterpiece Theatre) and airs under the banner Masterpiece Mystery!)	PBS	February 5, 1980	2008		
29–30 years	19	A Wedding Story	TLC	1996	present		
30 years	30	Private Screenings	TCM	January 1, 1996	present	28	Hosted by Robert Osborne.
30 years	30	Access Hollywood (Note: Also known as Access from 2017 to 2019)	Syndicated	September 9, 1996	present	11,844 (7,045 weeknights, 1,409 weekend, 3,390 weekdays)	
30 years	20	MoneyTV with Donald Baillargeon	Syndicated	October 1, 1996	present	950+	
29 years	29	Your World with Neil Cavuto	Fox News	October 6, 1996	January 17, 2025		Hosted by Neil Cavuto.
28–29 years	24	My Classic Car	TNN, MAVTV & Motor Trend	1997	present	520	
29 years	29	Antiques Roadshow	PBS	January 9, 1997	present		
29 years	20	¡Despierta América!	Univision	April 14, 1997	present		
29 years		The View	ABC	August 11, 1997	present		
29 years	29	South Park	Comedy Central	August 13, 1997	present	343	Longest-running Comedy Central series and the second longest-running American animated series.
27 years	27	The Lawrence Welk Show (Note: Originally The Dodge Dancing Party; reruns have been airing since 1982 on various PBS stations, oftentimes recut and spliced with new footage from surviving cast members to give the illusion of new episodes.)	ABC	July 2, 1955	September 4, 1971	1,065 (black-and-white, 1951 to September 1965; in color from September 1965 onwards to 1982)	Lawrence Welk died in 1992.
27 years	27	The Lawrence Welk Show	Syndicated	1971	February 1982	1,065 (black-and-white, 1951 to September 1965; in color from September 1965 onwards to 1982)	
27 years	27	The Jerry Springer Show	Syndicated	September 20, 1991	July 26, 2018	3,891	
27 years		The World Tomorrow	Syndicated	1967	1994	3,891	
26 years	26	Truth or Consequences	CBS	September 7, 1950 (Note: Hosted by Ralph Edwards.)	May 1951		Originated on NBC Radio from 1940 to 1951.
26 years	26	Truth or Consequences	NBC	1952 (Note: Hosted by Jack Bailey until 1956.)	1952		Originated on NBC Radio from 1940 to 1951.
26 years	26	Truth or Consequences	NBC	May 18, 1954 (Note: Hosted by Bob Barker; Steve Dunne also hosted a primetime version on NBC in 1958.)	September 24, 1965		Originated on NBC Radio from 1940 to 1951.
26 years	26	Truth or Consequences	Syndicated	1966 (Note: Hosted by Bob Barker.)	1974		Originated on NBC Radio from 1940 to 1951.
26 years	26	Truth or Consequences	Syndicated	1977 (Note: Hosted by Bob Hilton.)	1978		Originated on NBC Radio from 1940 to 1951.
26 years	26	Truth or Consequences	Syndicated	1987 (Note: Hosted by Larry Anderson.)	1988		Originated on NBC Radio from 1940 to 1951.
26 years		Hardball with Chris Matthews (Note: Originally called Politics with Chris Matthews)	America's Talking	1994	1996		Hosted by Chris Matthews.
26 years		Hardball with Chris Matthews	CNBC	1997	1999		Hosted by Chris Matthews.
26 years		Hardball with Chris Matthews	MSNBC	1999	February 28, 2020		Hosted by Chris Matthews.
26 years	25	Charlie Rose	PBS	September 30, 1991	November 17, 2017		
28 years	27	Fox & Friends	Fox News	February 1, 1998	present		
28 years	42	The Challenge (Note: Originally known as Road Rules: All Stars, followed by Real World/Road Rules Challenge.)	MTV	June 1, 1998	present	597	
26 years	21	Whose Line Is It Anyway?	ABC	August 5, 1998	September 4, 2004	431	Based on the original United Kingdom series (1988-99); Ryan Stiles and Colin Mochrie were the two most frequent panelists on both
26 years	21	Whose Line Is It Anyway?	ABC Family (Note: Now called Freeform.)	January 17, 2005	December 15, 2007	431	Based on the original United Kingdom series (1988-99); Ryan Stiles and Colin Mochrie were the two most frequent panelists on both
26 years	21	Whose Line Is It Anyway?	The CW	July 16, 2013	November 1, 2024	431	Based on the original United Kingdom series (1988-99); Ryan Stiles and Colin Mochrie were the two most frequent panelists on both
25 years	25	Arthur	PBS	October 7, 1996	February 21, 2022	253	Longest-running PBS animated series, second longest-running American animated children's series, and the fifth longest-running American animated series.
25 years	11	All That	Nickelodeon	January 21, 1995 (Note: Sneak peek airing April 16, 1994)	October 22, 2005	210	Was on hiatus from 2005 to 2019.
25 years	11	All That	Nickelodeon	June 15, 2019	December 17, 2020	210	Was on hiatus from 2005 to 2019.
25 years	11	Will & Grace	NBC	September 21, 1998	May 18, 2006	246	Was on hiatus from 2006 to 2017.
25 years	11	Will & Grace	NBC	September 28, 2017	April 23, 2020	246	Was on hiatus from 2006 to 2017.
27 years	28 (through 2026 season)	Fox College Football	Fox	January 1, 1999	present		
27 years	11	Futurama	Fox	March 28, 1999	August 10, 2003	180	
27 years	11	Futurama	Comedy Central	March 23, 2008	September 4, 2013	180	
27 years	11	Futurama	Hulu	July 24, 2023	present	180	
27 years	25	Family Guy	Fox	April 11, 1999 (Note: Sneak peek airing January 31, 1999)	February 14, 2002 (Note: "When You Wish Upon a Weinstein" originally aired on Adult Swim on November 9, 2003. It would later air on Fox on December 10, 2004.)	462	Second longest-running Fox animated series and the third longest-running American animated series.
27 years	25	Family Guy	Fox	May 1, 2005	present	462	Second longest-running Fox animated series and the third longest-running American animated series.
27 years	28	WWE SmackDown	UPN	April 29, 1999	September 15, 2006	1421	
27 years	28	WWE SmackDown	The CW	September 22, 2006	September 26, 2008	1421	
27 years	28	WWE SmackDown	MyNetworkTV	October 3, 2008	September 24, 2010	1421	
27 years	28	WWE SmackDown	Syfy	October 1, 2010	December 31, 2015	1421	
27 years	28	WWE SmackDown	USA	January 7, 2016	September 24, 2019	1421	
27 years	28	WWE SmackDown	Fox	October 4, 2019	September 6, 2024	1421	
27 years	28	WWE SmackDown	USA	September 13, 2024	present	1421	
27 years	17	SpongeBob SquarePants	Nickelodeon	July 17, 1999 (Note: Sneak peek airing May 1, 1999)	present	344	Longest-running Nickelodeon series from the '90s, longest-running Nickelodeon animated series, the first and (so far) only Nicktoon to go past ten seasons, the longest-running American animated children's television show, and the fourth longest-running American animated series.
27 years	28	Independent Lens	PBS	August 9, 1999	present	405	
27 years	Prime-time, Philbin's era: unspecified (Note: • original run (1999–2002): broadcast over 3 television seasons: in August 1999, November 1999, full 2000 and 2001, irregularly in 2002 up to June; also divided into 6 or 8 mini-seasons, • Super Millionaire (2004), • 10th Anniversary (2009)); Syndication: 17; Prime-time, Kimmel's era: 5 (Note: 1. 20th Anniversary (2020), 2. 2020/2021 season, 3. 25th Ann. (2024), 4. Summer 2025 season; 5. 2026 season)	Who Wants to Be a Millionaire	ABC	August 16, 1999	June 27, 2002	Prime-time: 436 (Note: As of October 28, 2026. • original run (1999–2002): 364, • Super Millionaire (2004): 12, • 10th Ann. (2009): 11, • Kimmel's era: 49); Syndication: 3,010	Although Millionaire has multiple versions known around the world, the American version is the longest-running.
27 years	Prime-time, Philbin's era: unspecified; Syndication: 17; Prime-time, Kimmel's era: 5	Who Wants to Be a Millionaire	Syndicated	September 16, 2002	May 31, 2019	Prime-time: 436; Syndication: 3,010	Although Millionaire has multiple versions known around the world, the American version is the longest-running.
27 years	Prime-time, Philbin's era: unspecified; Syndication: 17; Prime-time, Kimmel's era: 5	Who Wants to Be a Millionaire	ABC	April 8, 2020	present	Prime-time: 436; Syndication: 3,010	Although Millionaire has multiple versions known around the world, the American version is the longest-running.
27 years	16	Early Today	NBC	September 9, 1999	present		Lead-in to the Today show.
27 years	27	Judge Mathis	Syndicated	September 13, 1999	present		Of the court shows with a continuous, single series run, longest-running reality court show that is currently still in production, hosted by Greg Mathis.
27 years	28	Law & Order: Special Victims Unit	NBC	September 20, 1999	present	600	The longest-running scripted American live-action primetime television series and the longest-running television spin-off.
27 years	16	Classic Game Room	FromUSAlive	November 11, 1999	October 23, 2000	2,800	Longest-running web series
27 years	16	Classic Game Room	YouTube	February 28, 2008	present	2,800	Longest-running web series
26 years	23 (US)	Secrets of the Dead	PBS	May 15, 2000	present	107 + 6 specials (US)	
26 years		Homestar Runner	HomestarRunner.com	January 1, 2000	present		Second longest-running web series and longest-running animated web series for early 2000s
26 years	51	Survivor (American series)	CBS	May 31, 2000	present	735	Features two seasons per year.
26 years	21	Big Brother (American series)	CBS	July 5, 2000	present	719 (Note: For list of episodes, see here.)	Big Brother has multiple versions known around the world; the American version is the second-longest-running. Episode count also includes one Celebrity Edition.
26 years	13	Rick Steves' Europe	PBS	September 3, 2000	present	157	Hosted by travel writer Rick Steves.
26 years	21	Cheaters	Syndicated	October 21, 2000	present		
25 years	25	What's My Line? (Note: Longest-running game show in prime time network television)	CBS	February 16, 1950	September 3, 1967	CBS: 876; Syndication: 1,320; Total: 2,196	
25 years	25	What's My Line?	Syndicated	September 1968	September 1975	CBS: 876; Syndication: 1,320; Total: 2,196	
25 years	25	Camera Three	CBS	January 22, 1956	1979		
25 years	25	Camera Three	PBS	1979	July 1, 1980		
25 years	25	Sunrise Semester	CBS	September 9, 1957	October 1, 1982	800+	
25 years	23	Insight	Syndicated	October 2, 1960	January 21, 1985	250	
25 years	25	Larry King Live	CNN	June 3, 1985	December 16, 2010	6,120	King hosted Larry King Now afterwards, which was very similar.
25 years	25	The Oprah Winfrey Show	Syndicated	September 8, 1986	May 25, 2011	4,561	
25 years		The Real World	MTV	May 21, 1992	January 4, 2017		MTV's longest-running reality series.
25 years		The Real World	Facebook Watch	June 13, 2019	August 29, 2019		MTV's longest-running reality series.
25 years	25	Judge Judy	Syndicated	September 16, 1996	July 23, 2021	6,280	Of the single series run court shows without cancellation/revival gaps, the longest-running reality courtroom show, hosted by Judy Sheindlin.
25 years		NASCAR on Fox	Fox	February 11, 2001	present		
25 years		Pardon The Interruption	ESPN	October 22, 2001	present		

== 20–24 years ==
20 to 24 years
Length	Number of seasons	Series	Network	First broadcast	Last broadcast	Number of episodes	Notes
24 years	24	At the Movies (Note: Title through 1986. Subsequent titles: Siskel & Ebert & the Movies (1986–1989), Siskel & Ebert (1989–1999), Roger Ebert & the Movies (1999–2000), Ebert & Roeper and the Movies (2000–2001), Ebert & Roeper (2001–2007), At the Movies with Ebert & Roeper (2007–2008), At the Movies (2009–2010), Ebert presents At the Movies (2011).)	Syndicated	September 18, 1986	August 14, 2010		
24 years	24	At the Movies	PBS	January 2011	December 2011		
24 years	11	The X-Files	Fox	September 10, 1993	May 19, 2002	218	The program was on hiatus 2002–2016. Two new seasons have since been produced.
24 years	11	The X-Files	Fox	January 24, 2016	March 21, 2018	218	The program was on hiatus 2002–2016. Two new seasons have since been produced.
23 years	22	Showtime at the Apollo (Note: Also known as Showtime in Harlem, Showtime, and Live in Hollywood)	Syndicated	September 12, 1987	May 24, 2008	1,094	Was on hiatus in 2008–2016. Three specials were aired in 2016 and 2017
23 years	22	Showtime at the Apollo	Fox	March 1, 2018	May 24, 2018	1,094	Was on hiatus in 2008–2016. Three specials were aired in 2016 and 2017
23 years	23	Primetime (ABC News)	ABC	August 3, 1989	May 18, 2012		Originally hosted by Sam Donaldson and Diane Sawyer.
23 years	18	Death Valley Days	Syndicated	March 1, 1952	August 1, 1975	452	
23 years	24	The Ed Sullivan Show (Note: Aired as Toast of the Town until 1955)	CBS	June 20, 1948	June 6, 1971	1,068	
23 years	23	The George Michael Sports Machine (Note: Evolved from George Michael's Sports Final, 1980–1984)	NBC	September 2, 1984	September 8, 1991		George Michael died in 2009.
23 years	23	The George Michael Sports Machine	Syndicated	September 15, 1991	March 25, 2007		George Michael died in 2009.
23 years	23	The Merv Griffin Show	NBC	October 1962	March 1963	4,855	Merv Griffin died in 2007.
23 years	23	The Merv Griffin Show	Syndicated	1965	1969	4,855	Merv Griffin died in 2007.
23 years	23	The Merv Griffin Show	CBS	August 18, 1969	February 11, 1972	4,855	Merv Griffin died in 2007.
23 years	23	The Merv Griffin Show	Syndicated	1972	September 1986	4,855	Merv Griffin died in 2007.
23 years	21 (original series); 1 (revived series)	Reading Rainbow	PBS	June 6, 1983	November 10, 2006	155 (original series); 4 (revived series)	
23 years	17	Unsolved Mysteries	NBC	January 20, 1987 (Note: Includes series of specials, January 1987 to May 1988)	September 5, 1997	611	
23 years	17	Unsolved Mysteries	CBS	November 13, 1997	June 11, 1999	611	
23 years	17	Unsolved Mysteries	Lifetime	July 2, 2001	September 20, 2002	611	
23 years	17	Unsolved Mysteries	Spike (Note: Network later renamed Paramount Network.)	October 13, 2008	April 27, 2010	611	
23 years	6	Happy Tree Friends	Mondo Media	December 24, 1999	September 27, 2023	95	
23 years	12	Curb Your Enthusiasm	HBO	October 15, 2000	April 7, 2024	120 (and 1 special)	Longest-running scripted HBO program.
24–25 years	18	The Essentials	TCM	2001	present		
25 years	26	America's Test Kitchen	Syndicated	August 4, 2001	present	649	
25 years	39	The Amazing Race (American series)	CBS	September 5, 2001	present	450	Two seasons per year most years until 2015.
25 years	12	Aqua Teen Hunger Force (alternate titles)	Adult Swim	September 9, 2001 (Note: Sneak peek airing December 30, 2000 on Cartoon Network)	August 30, 2015	144 (1 unaired)	
25 years	12	Aqua Teen Hunger Force (alternate titles)	Adult Swim	November 26, 2023	present	144 (1 unaired)	
25 years	15	BET's Top 25	BET	September 22, 2001	present		
22 years	22	The Original Amateur Hour (Note: Originated on radio as Major Bowes' Original Amateur Hour, 1934–1946)	DuMont	January 18, 1948	October 1949		
22 years	22	The Original Amateur Hour	NBC	October 1949	September 1954		
22 years	22	The Original Amateur Hour	ABC	October 1955	June 1957		
22 years	22	The Original Amateur Hour	NBC	July 1957	October 1958		
22 years	22	The Original Amateur Hour	CBS	May 1959	October 1959		
22 years	22	The Original Amateur Hour	ABC	March 1960	September 26, 1960		
22 years	22	The Original Amateur Hour	CBS	October 2, 1960	September 27, 1970		
24 years	16	Cyberchase	PBS (PBS Kids)	January 21, 2002	October 7, 2004	153	Second longest-running PBS animated show and sixth longest-running American animated series.
24 years	16	Cyberchase	PBS Kids Go!	October 14, 2004	July 23, 2010	153	Second longest-running PBS animated show and sixth longest-running American animated series.
24 years	16	Cyberchase	PBS (PBS Kids)	November 4, 2013	present	153	Second longest-running PBS animated show and sixth longest-running American animated series.
24 years	24	Closing Bell	CNBC	February 4, 2002	present		
24 years	14	Illegal Knowledge	Access Tucson	March 24, 2002	present	66+	
24 years	29	The Bachelor	ABC	March 25, 2002	present	306	
24 years	24	American Idol	Fox	June 11, 2002	April 7, 2016	734	
24 years	24	American Idol	ABC	March 11, 2018	present	734	
24 years	24	The Daily Buzz	Syndicated, The CW Plus	September 16, 2002	present		Hosted by Shepard Smith.
24 years		Around the Horn	ESPN	November 4, 2002	May 23, 2025	4,953	
23 years	23	NBA Countdown	ESPN	December 25, 2002	present		
23 years	23	NBA on ESPN	ESPN	December 25, 2002	present		Sometimes broadcast on ABC as NBA on ABC.
21 years	16	NFL Total Access	NFL Network	2003	2024	297	
23 years	21 (1 unaired)	The Bachelorette	ABC	January 8, 2003	present	234	
23 years	25	Jimmy Kimmel Live!	ABC	January 26, 2003	present	3,588	Hosted by Jimmy Kimmel.
23 years	24	Real Time with Bill Maher	HBO	February 21, 2003	present	716	Hosted by Bill Maher.
23 years	24	America's Next Top Model	UPN	May 20, 2003	May 17, 2006	315	
23 years	24	America's Next Top Model	The CW	September 20, 2006	December 4, 2015	315	
23 years	24	America's Next Top Model	VH1	December 8, 2016	present	315	
23 years		Anderson Cooper 360°	CNN	September 8, 2003	present	1,521	Hosted by Anderson Cooper.
23 years	24	NCIS	CBS	September 23, 2003	present	512	
21 years	21	The O'Reilly Factor (Note: Originally The O'Reilly Report from 1996 to 1998)	Fox News	October 6, 1996	April 21, 2017		Final three episodes (April 19–21, 2017) were simply titled The Factor, with hosts Dana Perino (April 19–20) and Greg Gutfeld (April 21).
21 years	16	Good Eats	Food Network	July 7, 1999	April 29, 2010	256	
21 years	16	Good Eats	Cooking Channel	May 27, 2010	February 10, 2012	256	
21 years	16	Good Eats	Food Network	August 25, 2019	July 6, 2020	256	
21 years	16	Good Eats	Discovery+	February 18, 2021	March 25, 2021	256	
21 years	21	Issues and Answers (Note: Originally ABC Press Conference; succeeded in time slot by This Week)	ABC	1960	1981		
21 years	21	The Mike Douglas Show	Syndicated	1961	1982	4,747	Mike Douglas died in 2006.
21 years	21	Style with Elsa Klensch	CNN	June 1, 1980	January 2001		
21 years	21	Cookin' Cheap	PBS	1981	October 2002		
21 years	21	The New Yankee Workshop	PBS	January 1988	June 27, 2009	284	
21 years	21	Sneak Previews (Note: Originally Opening Soon at a Theater Near You (1975–1977); Sneak Previes Goes Video 1989–1991)	PBS	November 26, 1975	October 4, 1996		Had been hosted by: Roger Ebert (1975–1982), Gene Siskel (1975–1982), Neal Gabler (1982–1985), Jeffrey Lyons (1982–1996), and Michael Medved (1985–1996).
20 years	20	The Red Skelton Show	NBC	September 30, 1951	June 21, 1953	672	
20 years	20	The Red Skelton Show	CBS	September 22, 1953	June 23, 1970	672	
20 years	20	The Red Skelton Show	NBC	September 14, 1970	August 29, 1971	672	
20 years	31	For Your Home	PBS	1996	2016		
20 years	21	Modern Marvels	History Channel	January 1, 1995	April 11, 2015	691	
20 years	20	Total Request Live	MTV	September 14, 1998	November 16, 2008	2,254	
20 years	20	Total Request Live	MTV	October 2, 2017	November 2018	2,254	
22 years	20	Angry Video Game Nerd	Cinemassarce	May 10, 2004	present	236	
22 years	23	The First 48	A&E	June 3, 2004	present	465	
20 years	20	Gunsmoke (Note: It was at one time, prior to The Simpsons succeeding it, known as the longest-running primetime entertainment program with a consistent setting and recurring characters. While other primetime shows have run longer, they are all news, sports, anthology or variety programs.)	CBS	September 10, 1955	September 1, 1975	635	Tied longest-running primetime drama.
20 years	20	The Secret Storm	CBS	February 1, 1954	February 8, 1974	5,195	Tied longest-running primetime drama.
20 years	20	Investigative Reports	A&E	September 27, 1991	2011		Hosted by Bill Kurtis.
20 years	21	Dr. Phil	Syndicated	September 16, 2002	May 25, 2023	3,505	Hosted by Phil McGraw.
20 years	20	Faith 20	Syndicated	1977	1997		
20 years	20	The Doctors	NBC	April 1, 1963	December 31, 1982	5,155	
20 years	20	Evans and Novak (Note: Other names: Evans, Novak, Hunt, and Shields (1998–2001), Novak, Hunt, and Shields (2001–2002))	CNN	September 1982	November 9, 2002		Originally hosted by Rowland Evans and Robert Novak; later joined by Al Hunt and Mark Shields.
21 years	11	Robot Chicken	Adult Swim	February 20, 2005	present	220 (and 13 specials)	
21 years	25	Intervention	A&E	March 6, 2005	present	355	
21 years	13	Iron Chef America	Food Network	March 6, 2005	July 22, 2018	205	
21 years	23	Grey's Anatomy	ABC	March 27, 2005	present	471	
21 years	23	Deadliest Catch	Discovery	April 12, 2005	present	385	
21 years	22	American Dad!	Fox	May 1, 2005 (Note: Sneak peek airing February 6, 2005)	September 21, 2014	401	Third longest-running Fox animated series and the second longest-running Seth MacFarlane show. Returned to Fox in 2026.
21 years	22	American Dad!	TBS	October 20, 2014	present	401	Third longest-running Fox animated series and the second longest-running Seth MacFarlane show. Returned to Fox in 2026.
21 years	25	Hell's Kitchen	Fox	May 30, 2005	present	386	
21 years	35	Dancing with the Stars	ABC	June 1, 2005	November 22, 2021	524	
21 years	35	Dancing with the Stars	Disney+	September 19, 2022	present	524	
21 years	35	Dancing with the Stars	ABC	September 26, 2023	present	524	
14 years	14	Food Network Star	Food Network	June 5, 2005	August 5, 2018	75	
19 years	18	So You Think You Can Dance	Fox	July 20, 2005	May 20, 2024	319	
21 years	18	It's Always Sunny in Philadelphia	FX	August 4, 2005	December 20, 2012	188	The longest-running American live-action sitcom.
21 years	18	It's Always Sunny in Philadelphia	FXX	September 4, 2013	present	188	The longest-running American live-action sitcom.
21 years	19	Criminal Minds (Note: Also known as Criminal Minds: Evolution since 2022)	CBS	September 22, 2005	February 19, 2020	364	
21 years	19	Criminal Minds	Paramount+	November 24, 2022	present	364	
20 years	9	Cash Cab	Discovery	December 5, 2005	present	440	Was on hiatus from 2012 to 2017.
20 years	23	Top Chef	Bravo	March 8, 2006	present	344	
20 years	20	The Real Housewives of Orange County	Bravo	March 21, 2006	present	367	Part of the Real Housewives franchise.
20 years	3	Animator vs. Animation	Newgrounds	June 3, 2006	present	14	
20 years	21	America's Got Talent	NBC	June 21, 2006	present	508	

== 15–19 years ==
15 to 19 years
Length	Number of seasons	Series	Network	First broadcast	Last broadcast	Number of episodes	Notes
19 years	19	Lassie	CBS	September 12, 1954	May 1971	591	
19 years	19	Lassie	Syndicated	September 1971	March 24, 1973	591	
19 years	19	The Porter Wagoner Show	Syndicated	1960	1979		
19 years	19	Computer Chronicles	PBS	1983	June 25, 2002		Was presented by Stewart Cheifet.
19 years	19	Sally	Syndicated	October 17, 1983	May 22, 2002	3,820	Was hosted by Sally Jessy Raphael.
19 years	19	Friday Night Videos (Note: Title changed to Friday Night in 1994–2000, Late Friday in 2001–2002. In both cases, the title change accompanied a change in program format)	NBC	July 29, 1983	May 24, 2002		
19 years	19	ESPN Sunday Night Football (Note: Moved to NBC in 2006, at which time Monday Night Football moves from ABC to ESPN)	ESPN	November 8, 1987 (Note: Sunday Night Football shared with TNT, with TNT getting the first half of the season, ESPN the second half, 1990–1997)	January 1, 2006		
19 years	29	Barefoot Contessa	Food Network	November 30, 2002	December 19, 2021	297	
18 years	18	Art Linkletter's House Party (Note: Also on CBS Radio, 1945–1967)	CBS	September 1, 1952	September 5, 1969		Was hosted by Art Linkletter.
18 years	18	Art Linkletter's House Party	NBC	December 29, 1969	September 25, 1970		Was hosted by Art Linkletter.
18 years	18	NASCAR on TBS	TBS	February 27, 1983	October 8, 2000		
18 years	14	Barney & Friends (Note: Reruns only (no first-run episodes) in 1994, 1996, and 2001)	PBS	April 6, 1992	November 2, 2010	268	
18 years	8	Dora the Explorer	Nickelodeon	August 14, 2000	June 5, 2014	177	Third longest-running Nickelodeon series, the ninth longest-running American animated series, and the longest-running Nick Jr. series. The program was on hiatus from 2014 to 2019.
18 years	8	Dora the Explorer	Nickelodeon	July 7, 2019	August 9, 2019	177	Third longest-running Nickelodeon series, the ninth longest-running American animated series, and the longest-running Nick Jr. series. The program was on hiatus from 2014 to 2019.
18 years	16	Ghost Hunters	Sci Fi Channel / Syfy	October 6, 2004	October 26, 2016	251 (+ 12 specials not included)	The program was on hiatus 2016–2019.
18 years	16	Ghost Hunters	A&E	August 21, 2019	May 27, 2020	251 (+ 12 specials not included)	The program was on hiatus 2016–2019.
18 years	16	Ghost Hunters	Discovery+	October 31, 2021	March 19, 2022	251 (+ 12 specials not included)	The program was on hiatus 2016–2019.
18 years	16	Ghost Hunters	Travel Channel	October 1, 2022	May 25, 2023	251 (+ 12 specials not included)	The program was on hiatus 2016–2019.
18 years	19	The Ellen DeGeneres Show	Syndicated	September 8, 2003	May 28, 2022	3,339	Hosted by Ellen DeGeneres.
20 years	15	Million Dollar Listing Los Angeles	Bravo	August 29, 2006	present	166	
17 years	17	The Dating Game	ABC	December 20, 1965	January 17, 1970		Hosted by Jim Lange. ABC Daytime
17 years	17	The Dating Game	Syndicated	September 10, 1973	September 1999		Hosted by Jim Lange (1966–1978), Elaine Joyce (1986–1987), Jeff MacGregor (1987–1989), Brad Sherwood & Chuck Woolery (1997–1999). Revived for 8 episodes in 2021 as The Celebrity Dating Game on ABC.
17 years	17	NBA on CBS	CBS	October 20, 1973	June 14, 1990		
17 years	17	Showbiz Today	CNN	October 29, 1984	2001		
17 years	17	Capital Gang	CNN	September 7, 1988	2005		
17 years	17	The Montel Williams Show	Syndicated	September 30, 1991	May 16, 2008	4,325	Was hosted by Montel Williams.
17 years	18	Last Call with Carson Daly	NBC	January 8, 2002	May 24, 2019	2,000	Hosted by Carson Daly.
17 years	16	Shepard Smith Reporting (Note: Originally Studio B with Shepard Smith.)	Fox News	August 2002	October 11, 2019		
18 years	19	Red vs. Blue	Rooster Teeth	April 1, 2003	December 29, 2021	355	
17 years	8	American Chopper	Discovery Channel	March 31, 2003	October 18, 2007	179	
17 years	8	American Chopper	TLC	January 17, 2008	February 11, 2010	179	
17 years	8	American Chopper	Discovery Channel	March 1, 2018	August 4, 2020	179	
15 years	13	Bizarre Foods with Andrew Zimmern (Note: Episode count includes spinoff series Delicious Destinations.)	Travel Channel Cooking Channel	November 1, 2006	June 21, 2021	147	
19 years	43	Diners, Drive-Ins and Dives	Food Network	April 23, 2007	present	534	
19 years	15	American Greed	CNBC	June 21, 2007	present	222 (& 3 specials)	
19 years	19	Nostalgia Critic	YouTube	July 3, 2007	present	825	
18 years	19	The Steve Wilkos Show	Syndicated	September 10, 2007	October 7, 2026	2,200+	
19 years	10	Kitchen Nightmares	Fox	September 19, 2007	September 12, 2014	125	
19 years	10	Kitchen Nightmares	Fox	September 25, 2023	present	125	
16 years	16	USA Tuesday Night Fights	USA	March 30, 1982	August 25, 1998		
16 years	16	MTV Unplugged	MTV	November 26, 1989	March 2, 2007 (Note: New episodes sporadic after 2001.)	108	
16 years	16	Booknotes	C-SPAN	April 2, 1989	December 5, 2004	801	Had been presented by Brian Lamb. The program lead to Book TV becoming regular weekend programming on C-SPAN2.
16 years	16	Fight Back! with David Horowitz	Syndicated	September 20, 1976	1992	582 (including California/Consumer Buyline)	Was hosted by David Horowitz.
16 years	14	Forensic Files	TLC	April 23, 1996	December 29, 1999	406, including six hour-long specials	
16 years	14	Forensic Files	Court TV	September 12, 2000	December 24, 2007	406, including six hour-long specials	
16 years	14	Forensic Files	TruTV	January 7, 2008	June 17, 2011	406, including six hour-long specials	
16 years	14	The Adventures of Ozzie and Harriet	ABC	October 3, 1952	April 23, 1966	435	
16 years	10	The Fairly OddParents	Nickelodeon	March 30, 2001	November 25, 2006	172	Longest-running Nickelodeon animated series from the 2000s and the ninth longest-running American animated series.
16 years	10	The Fairly OddParents	Nickelodeon	February 18, 2008	September 16, 2016	172	Longest-running Nickelodeon animated series from the 2000s and the ninth longest-running American animated series.
16 years	10	The Fairly OddParents	Nicktoons	January 18, 2017	July 26, 2017	172	Longest-running Nickelodeon animated series from the 2000s and the ninth longest-running American animated series.
16 years	16	Morning Joe First Look (Note: Formerly First Look)	MSNBC	2004	September 18, 2020		
16 years	13	Squidbillies	Adult Swim	October 16, 2005	December 13, 2021	132	
16 years	17	Rachael Ray	Syndicated	September 18, 2006	July 28, 2023	2,941	
18 years	18	What Would You Do?	ABC	February 26, 2008	present		
18 years	16	The Real Housewives of New York City	Bravo	March 4, 2008	present	301	Part of the Real Housewives franchise.
18 years	15	Fareed Zakaria GPS	CNN	June 1, 2008	present	796	Hosted by Fareed Zakaria.
18 years	17	The Real Housewives of Atlanta	Bravo	October 7, 2008	present	360	Part of the Real Housewives franchise.
15 years	15	Jack Hanna's Animal Adventures	Syndicated	October 2, 1993	May 24, 2008		Was hosted by Jack Hanna.
15 years	16	Sportsworld (Note: Was also known as NBC SportsWorld.)	NBC	1978	1992		
15 years	15	WWF Superstars	Syndicated	September 6, 1986	1996	924	
15 years	15	WWF Superstars	USA	1996	2000	924	
15 years	15	WWF Superstars	TNN (Note: Relaunched as Paramount Network in 2018.)	2000	August 2001	924	
15 years	15	The Jack Benny Program	CBS	October 28, 1950	September 15, 1964	261	Starred Jack Benny.
15 years	15	The Jack Benny Program	NBC	September 25, 1964	April 16, 1965	261	Starred Jack Benny.
15 years	15	That Good Ole Nashville Music	Syndicated	1970	1985		
15 years	15	Scientific American Frontiers	PBS	October 3, 1990	April 13, 2005	97	
15 years	15	Newton's Apple	PBS	October 15, 1983	October 31, 1999	195	
15 years	15	ER	NBC	September 19, 1994	April 2, 2009	331	
15 years	15	CSI: Crime Scene Investigation	CBS	October 6, 2000	September 27, 2015	337	
15 years	17 (Note: Each calendar year is defined as a season; this count includes the pilot season, but not the special season. On some listings and streaming/video-on-demand services, the season count is 19 for the original series.)	MythBusters	Discovery Channel	January 23, 2003	March 5, 2016	296	
15 years	17	MythBusters	Science Channel	November 15, 2017	February 28, 2018	296	
15 years	7	The Venture Bros.	Adult Swim	February 16, 2003	October 7, 2018	81 (+1 pilot and 4 specials)	
15 years	15	Supernatural	The WB	September 13, 2005	May 4, 2006	327	
15 years	15	Supernatural	The CW	September 28, 2006	November 19, 2020	327	
17 years	61	Chopped	Food Network	January 13, 2009	present	749 + 39 specials	
17 years	18	RuPaul's Drag Race	VH1	February 2, 2009	present	254	Hosted by RuPaul.
17 years	22	Ancient Aliens	History	March 8, 2009	present	283	
17 years	23	Pawn Stars	History	July 19, 2009	present	675	
17 years	18	Shark Tank	ABC	August 9, 2009	present	384	
17 years	18	Annoying Orange	YouTube	October 9, 2009	present	855	
16 years	18	American Ninja Warrior	NBC	December 12, 2009	present	262	
16 years	6	Battle for Dream Island	YouTube	January 1, 2010	present	116 (121 parts)	
16 years	30	Worst Cooks in America	Food Network	January 3, 2010	present	226	
16 years	27	American Pickers	History	January 18, 2010	present	402	
16 years	6	TuTiTu	YouTube	July 27, 2010	present		
16 years	16	MasterChef (U.S. series)	Fox	July 27, 2010	present	322	
16 years	17	Swamp People	History	August 22, 2010	present	288	
16 years	7	Epic Rap Battles of History	YouTube	September 26, 2010	present	92	
15 years	18	Storage Wars	A&E	December 1, 2010	present	368	
15 years	16	Bob's Burgers	Fox	January 9, 2011	present	313	
15 years	30	The Voice (U.S. series)	NBC	April 26, 2011	present	689	
15 years	7	The Amazing World of Gumball	Cartoon Network	May 3, 2011	June 24, 2019	280	Was on hiatus from 2019 to 2025.
15 years	7	The Amazing World of Gumball	Hulu	July 28, 2025	present	280	The Wonderfully Weird World of Gumball

== 10–14 years ==
10 to 14 years
Length	Number of seasons	Series	Network	First broadcast	Last broadcast	Number of episodes	Notes
14 years	13	Ryan's Hope	ABC	July 7, 1975	January 13, 1989	3,515	
14 years	5	Davey and Goliath	Syndicated	February 25, 1961	June 29, 1975	66 (+ 7 specials)	
14 years	15	An Evening at the Improv	A&E	February 3, 1982	January 1, 1996		
14 years	14	Watch Mr. Wizard	NBC	May 26, 1951	June 27, 1965	547	Don Herbert was Mr. Wizard.
14 years	14	The Jack LaLanne Show	Syndicated	1956	1970		
14 years	14	Bonanza (Note: First U.S. network series to film all its episodes in color)	NBC	September 12, 1959	January 16, 1973	431	
14 years	14	Knots Landing	CBS	December 27, 1979	May 13, 1993	344	
14 years	14	The Bugs Bunny and Tweety Show	ABC	September 13, 1986	September 2, 2000	387+	
14 years	14	Speed Week	ESPN	1983	1997		
14 years	15	Video Soul	BET	June 26, 1981	September 1996		
14 years	14	Xplay (Note: Previously GameSpot TV, Extended Play, and X-Play)	ZDTV / TechTV	July 4, 1998	2004	1,378+	
14 years	14	Xplay	G4techTV	2004	2005	1,378+	
14 years	14	Xplay	G4	2005	January 23, 2013	1,378+	
14 years	14	Xplay	G4	2021	October 20, 2022	1,378+	
14 years	15	Curious George	PBS Kids	September 4, 2006	April 1, 2015	198 (+ 3 specials)	
14 years	15	Curious George	Family Jr.	September 3, 2018	February 21, 2020	198 (+ 3 specials)	
14 years	15	Curious George	Peacock	July 15, 2020	March 17, 2022	198 (+ 3 specials)	
14 years	14	Archer	FX	September 17, 2009	June 2, 2016	145	
14 years	14	Archer	FXX	April 5, 2017	December 17, 2023	145	
14 years		Blue Bloods	CBS	September 24, 2010	December 13, 2024		
13 years	14	Mad TV	Fox	October 14, 1995	May 16, 2009	321	Longest-running rival sketch show to Saturday Night Live; longest-running Fox sketch show.
13 years	13	Gardening by the Yard	HGTV	1996	2009		
13 years	14	NASCAR on TNT	TNT	July 22, 2001	July 13, 2014		
13 years	15	The Apprentice	NBC	January 8, 2004	February 13, 2017	194	The first fourteen seasons were presented by Donald Trump.
13 years	20	Keeping Up with the Kardashians	E!	October 14, 2007	June 20, 2021	280 + 6 specials	
13 years	14	NCIS: Los Angeles	CBS	September 22, 2009	May 21, 2023	323	
15 years	13	American Horror Story	FX	October 5, 2011	present	144	
13 years	13	Howdy Doody	NBC	December 27, 1947	September 24, 1960		Was in black and white until 1956, and color thereafter.
13 years	14	Armstrong Circle Theatre	NBC	June 6, 1950	June 1957	370	
13 years	14	Armstrong Circle Theatre	CBS	October 1957	August 28, 1963	370	
13 years	9	The Twentieth Century (Note: Known as The 21st Century from 1967 to 1970)	CBS	October 20, 1957	January 4, 1970	219	Was hosted by Walter Cronkite.
13 years	8	Fat Albert and the Cosby Kids	CBS	September 9, 1972	November 13, 1982	110 (+ 5 specials)	Presented by Bill Cosby.
13 years	8	Fat Albert and the Cosby Kids	Syndicated	September 1, 1984	August 10, 1985	110 (+ 5 specials)	Presented by Bill Cosby.
13 years		Dallas	CBS	April 2, 1978	May 3, 1991		
13 years	13	PM Magazine (Note: Aired locally on KPIX San Francisco as Evening: The MTWTF Show, 1976–1978)	Syndicated	September 1978	August 30, 1991		
13 years	13	Later	NBC	August 22, 1988	January 18, 2001		Originally hosted by Bob Costas.
13 years	13	Tim Russert	CNBC	1994	2008		
13 years	15	King of the Hill	Fox	January 12, 1997	May 6, 2010 (Note: The show was kept in production for four episodes beyond what Fox had ordered for the final season. Several months after the last broadcast on Fox, these four leftover episodes premiered in syndication from May 3 through May 6, 2010.)	279	Third longest-running Fox animated series.
13 years	13	Hannity & Colmes	Fox News	October 6, 1996	January 9, 2009		
13 years	13	The Wendy Williams Show	Syndicated	July 14, 2008	June 17, 2022	1500+	Hosted by Wendy Williams.
12 years	9	Rugrats	Nickelodeon	August 11, 1991	August 1, 2004	172	
12 years	12	American Sports Cavalcade	TNN	1983	1995		
12 years	33	The Joy of Painting	PBS	January 11, 1983	May 17, 1994	429	Starred Bob Ross.
12 years	12	CBS Reports	CBS	October 27, 1959	September 7, 1971		
12 years	12	My Three Sons	ABC	September 29, 1960	September 2, 1965	380	
12 years	12	My Three Sons	CBS	September 16, 1965	August 24, 1972	380	
12 years	12	NYPD Blue	ABC	September 21, 1993	March 1, 2005	261	
12 years	12	Murder, She Wrote	CBS	September 30, 1984	May 19, 1996	264	
12 years	12	Hawaii Five-O (original series)	CBS	September 26, 1968	April 26, 1980	282	
12 years	12	Loving	ABC	June 26, 1983	November 10, 1995	3,169	
12 years	12	Lifestyles of the Rich and Famous	Syndicated	January 1984	September 1996		
12 years	25	Lockup	MSNBC	June 4, 2005	February 11, 2017	237	
12 years	12	House of Style	MTV	January 1, 1989	2000		
12 years	12	The Jenny Jones Show	Syndicated	September 16, 1991	September 12, 2003	2,000+	
12 years	12	Room by Room	HGTV	December 31, 1994	2006 (Note: HGTV continues to present reruns after non-renewal of series)		
12 years	12	NBA on NBC	NBC	1990	2002		Hosted by Rachael Ray.
12 years	12	Marty Stouffer's Wild America	PBS	1982	1994	120	
12 years	12	Two and a Half Men	CBS	September 22, 2003	February 19, 2015	262	
12 years	12	Bones	Fox	September 13, 2005	March 28, 2017	246	
12 years	6	Bubble Guppies	Nickelodeon	January 24, 2011	October 21, 2016	129	
12 years	6	Bubble Guppies	Nickelodeon	September 27, 2019	June 30, 2023	129	
14 years	15	Chicago Fire	NBC	October 10, 2012	present	301	
11 years	13	Road Rules	MTV	July 19, 1995	May 9, 2007		
11 years		NASCAR on Speed	Speed	February 11, 2002	August 17, 2013		
11 years	17	Star Search (Note: Ed McMahon's Star Search, 1992–1995)	Syndicated	September 10, 1983	May 20, 1995		Originally presented by Ed McMahon.
11 years	17	Star Search	CBS	2003	April 2004		Originally presented by Ed McMahon.
11 years	11	Flipping Out	Bravo	July 31, 2007	2018	108	
11 years	11	The Chris Matthews Show	Syndicated	September 22, 2002	July 21, 2013		Was hosted by Chris Matthews.
11 years	11	Kraft Television Theatre (Note: Also known as Kraft Mystery Theatre (1958); another series of the same name ran concurrently on ABC, 1953–1955)	NBC	May 7, 1947	October 1, 1958	650	
11 years	11	Homes Across America (Note: Had 13 week seasons, according to HGTV)	HGTV	December 1994	October 12, 2005		
11 years	11	Denise Austin's Daily Workout	ESPN2; Lifetime	1997	2008		Was hosted by Denise Austin.
11 years	11	The Voice of Firestone	NBC	September 5, 1949	June 1954		Was previously on NBC Radio.
11 years	11	The Voice of Firestone	ABC	June 1954	June 1959		Was previously on NBC Radio.
11 years	11	The Voice of Firestone	ABC	September 1962	June 16, 1963		Was previously on NBC Radio.
11 years	11	You Bet Your Life	NBC	October 5, 1950	June 29, 1961	529 + 1 unaired	Was presented by Groucho Marx. Previously was on multiple radio networks.
11 years	11	The Andy Williams Show	CBS	1957	1959		Starred Andy Williams.
11 years	11	The Andy Williams Show	NBC	1962	1971		Starred Andy Williams.
11 years	12	Tosh.0	Comedy Central	June 4, 2009	November 24, 2020	301	
11 years	11	Beat the Clock (original series) (Note: Emcee: Bud Collyer)	CBS	March 23, 1950	September 12, 1958		
11 years	11	Beat the Clock (original series)	ABC	October 13, 1958	January 30, 1961		
11 years		The General Electric College Bowl (Note: Also known as G.E. College Bowl; on NBC radio, 1953–1955; pilot shot 1955.)	CBS	January 4, 1959	1963		
11 years		The General Electric College Bowl	NBC	1963	June 14, 1970		
11 years	11	The Wilburn Brothers Show	Syndicated (Note: Reruns now run on RFD-TV.)	1963	1974	354	
11 years	11	The Carol Burnett Show	CBS	September 11, 1967	March 29, 1978	279	Starred Carol Burnett.
11 years	11	Happening Now	Fox News	November 5, 2007	June 8, 2018		
11 years	11	M*A*S*H	CBS	September 17, 1972	February 28, 1983	256	
11 years	11	The Howard Stern Show	E!	June 18, 1994	July 8, 2005		Hosted by Howard Stern.
11 years	11	Geraldo	Syndicated	1987	1998		Last two seasons aired as The Geraldo Rivera Show.
11 years	11	Love Connection	Syndicated	September 19, 1983	July 1, 1994	2,425	
11 years	11	The Danny Thomas Show	ABC (Note: As Make Room for Daddy; NBC used the same name when airing reruns of this series, 1960–1965)	September 29, 1953	July 1957	343	
11 years	11	The Danny Thomas Show	CBS (Note: As The Danny Thomas Show)	September 1957	September 14, 1964	343	
11 years	11	Baywatch	NBC	September 22, 1989	April 6, 1990	241	
11 years	11	Baywatch	Syndicated	September 23, 1991	May 14, 2001	241	
11 years	11	Talk Soup	E!	January 7, 1991	May 17, 2002		
11 years	11	Martha Stewart Living	Syndicated	September 1993	2004		The very similar Martha Stewart Show aired from 2005 to 2012.
11 years	5	The Crocodile Hunter	Animal Planet	October 25, 1996	September 4, 2007	78 (including pilot and 13 specials)	Longest-running Animal Planet series.
11 years	8	ToonHeads	Cartoon Network	October 2, 1992	July 1, 2001	102	
11 years	8	ToonHeads	Adult Swim	November 4, 2001	November 23, 2003	102	
11 years	11	Imus in the Morning (Note: Simulcast of live program at WFAN in New York.)	MSNBC	September 2, 1996	April 11, 2007		Was hosted by Don Imus.
11 years	11	Fox News Live	Fox News	October 6, 1996	February 24, 2008		
11 years	11	The Jeffersons	CBS	January 18, 1975	July 23, 1985	253	
11 years	11	Paula's Home Cooking	Food Network	2002	2013	135+	
11 years	12	The Big Bang Theory	CBS	September 24, 2007	May 16, 2019	279	
11 years		Star Wars: The Clone Wars	Cartoon Network	October 3, 2008	March 2, 2013		
11 years		Star Wars: The Clone Wars	Netflix	March 7, 2013			
11 years		Star Wars: The Clone Wars	Disney+	February 21, 2020	May 4, 2020		
11 years	17	Bad Girls Club	Oxygen	December 5, 2006	May 2, 2017	275	
13 years	9	Teen Titans Go!	Cartoon Network	April 23, 2013	present	456	Longest-running non-Cartoon Network Studios series Longest-running non-Cartoon Network series from the 2010s
13 years	14	Paw Patrol	Nickelodeon	August 12, 2013	present	320	
13 years	42	Beat Bobby Flay	Food Network	August 24, 2013	present	528	Hosted by Bobby Flay.
10 years	9	MasterChef Junior (U.S. series)	Fox	September 27, 2013	May 20, 2024	105	Out of production but not officially cancelled
11 years	12	Intimate Portrait	Lifetime	January 3, 1994	October 3, 2005	271	
10 years	11	Ricki Lake	Syndicated	September 13, 1993	May 21, 2004	Approximately 2,000	
10 years	11	7th Heaven (Note: Longest-running family drama on television, per Reuters article about 7th Heaven finale)	The WB	August 26, 1996	May 8, 2006	243	
10 years	11	7th Heaven	The CW	September 25, 2006	May 13, 2007 (Note: Scheduled date of last episode)	243	
10 years	11	Married... with Children	Fox	April 5, 1987	June 9, 1997	259	
10 years	11	Happy Days	ABC	January 15, 1974	September 24, 1984	255	
10 years	10	Between the Lions	PBS	April 3, 2000	November 22, 2010	130	
10 years	10	American Morning	CNN	September 12, 2001	December 30, 2011	2,688	
10 years	10	Arthur Godfrey's Talent Scouts (Note: On CBS radio 1946–1956)	CBS	December 6, 1948	January 1, 1958		Starred Arthur Godfrey.
10 years	10	Arthur Godfrey and His Friends	CBS	January 12, 1949	April 28, 1959		
10 years	3	Wonder Pets!	Nickelodeon	March 3, 2006	September 3, 2016	Shorts: 2; Full-length episodes: 62	Fifth longest-running Nickelodeon show and second longest-running Nick Jr. series.
10 years	4	Mickey Mouse Clubhouse	Playhouse Disney	May 5, 2006	January 3, 2011	125	Longest-running Disney animated series from 2000s
10 years	4	Mickey Mouse Clubhouse	Disney Junior	February 14, 2011	November 6, 2016	125	Longest-running Disney animated series from 2000s
10 years	10	Pantomime Quiz (Note: Originally aired locally in Los Angeles, 1947–1950)	CBS	October 4, 1949	August 28, 1951		
10 years	10	Pantomime Quiz	NBC	January 2, 1952	March 26, 1952		
10 years	10	Pantomime Quiz	CBS	July 4, 1952	September 1952		
10 years	10	Pantomime Quiz	CBS	July 1953	August 28, 1953		
10 years	10	Pantomime Quiz	DuMont	October 20, 1953	April 13, 1954		
10 years	10	Pantomime Quiz	CBS	July 9, 1954	August 27, 1954		
10 years	10	Pantomime Quiz	ABC	January 1955	March 1955		
10 years	10	Pantomime Quiz	CBS	July 8, 1955	September 6, 1957		
10 years	10	Pantomime Quiz	ABC	April 1958	September 1958		
10 years	10	Pantomime Quiz	ABC	January 1959	September 1959		
10 years	10	The Arthur Murray Party	ABC	July 20, 1950	September 1950		The first series to be shown on four U.S. broadcasting networks
10 years	10	The Arthur Murray Party	DuMont	October 1950	March 1951		The first series to be shown on four U.S. broadcasting networks
10 years	10	The Arthur Murray Party	ABC	April 1951	May 1952		The first series to be shown on four U.S. broadcasting networks
10 years	10	The Arthur Murray Party	CBS	July 1952	August 1952		The first series to be shown on four U.S. broadcasting networks
10 years	10	The Arthur Murray Party	DuMont	October 1952	April 1953		The first series to be shown on four U.S. broadcasting networks
10 years	10	The Arthur Murray Party	CBS	June 1953	October 1953		The first series to be shown on four U.S. broadcasting networks
10 years	10	The Arthur Murray Party	NBC	October 1953	September 1955		The first series to be shown on four U.S. broadcasting networks
10 years	10	The Arthur Murray Party	CBS	April 1956	September 1956		The first series to be shown on four U.S. broadcasting networks
10 years	10	The Arthur Murray Party	NBC	July 1957	September 6, 1960		The first series to be shown on four U.S. broadcasting networks
10 years	10	Smilin' Ed's Gang (Note: Began on radio as Ed McConnell and the Buster Brown Gang, 1929–1950; became Andy's Gang in 1954 when Andy Devine became host after McConnell's death)	NBC	August 26, 1950	May 19, 1951		
10 years	10	Smilin' Ed's Gang	CBS	August 11, 1951	April 11, 1953		
10 years	10	Smilin' Ed's Gang	ABC	August 22, 1953	April 23, 1955		
10 years	10	Smilin' Ed's Gang	CBS	August 20, 1955	December 31, 1960		
10 years	10	A Current Affair	Syndicated	July 28, 1986	August 30, 1996		
10 years	11	Cheers	NBC	September 30, 1982	May 20, 1993	275	
10 years	11	Frasier	NBC	September 16, 1993	May 13, 2004	264	
10 years	10	Getting Fit	ESPN	1987	1997		
10 years	10	NASCAR on TNN	TNN	1991	2000		
10 years	10	The French Chef	PBS	February 11, 1963	February 11, 1973	201	Starred Julia Child.
10 years	6	Ed, Edd n Eddy	Cartoon Network	January 4, 1999	November 8, 2009	69	Longest-running Cartoon Network original series Longest-running Cartoon Network original series from the 90s Longest-running Cartoon Cartoon
10 years	11	Modern Family	ABC	September 23, 2009	April 8, 2020	250	
10 years	10	The United States Steel Hour	ABC	October 27, 1953	1955	253	
10 years	10	The United States Steel Hour	NBC	1955	June 12, 1963	253	
13 years	42	Guy's Grocery Games	Food Network	October 20, 2013	present	542	
12 years	9	Rick and Morty	Adult Swim	December 2, 2013	present	91	
12 years	14	Chicago P.D.	NBC	January 8, 2014	present	270	
12 years	9	Blaze and the Monster Machines	Nickelodeon	October 13, 2014	December 1, 2025	180	
10 years	12	Ice Road Truckers	History	June 17, 2007	November 9, 2017	146	
10 years	10	USA Up All Night	USA	January 7, 1989	March 7, 1998	over 900	
10 years	10	Nashville Now	TNN	March 8, 1983	October 15, 1993		
10 years	10	The Loud House	Nickelodeon	May 2, 2016	present	315	
10 years	11	Shameless (U.S. series)	Showtime	January 9, 2011	April 11, 2021	134	Showtime's longest-running original scripted series
10 years	11	Scrubs	NBC	October 2, 2001	May 8, 2008	150	
10 years	11	Scrubs	ABC	January 6, 2009	March 17, 2010	32	
10 years	11	Scrubs	ABC	February 25, 2026	Present	14	

== See also ==
=== Lists of longest-running American shows by broadcast type ===
- List of longest-running American cable television series
- List of longest-running American broadcast network television series
- List of longest-running American primetime television series
- List of longest-running American first-run syndicated television series
- List of longest-running scripted American primetime television series

=== Lists of longest-running shows internationally ===
- List of longest-running television shows by category – international list
- List of longest-running Indian television series
- List of longest-running British television programmes
- List of longest-running Australian television series
- List of longest-running Philippine television series
- List of longest-running Spanish television series

=== List of shortest running shows ===
- List of television series canceled after one episode
- List of television series canceled before airing an episode
