= Hannah Stouffer =

American artist, illustrator and art director

Hannah Stouffer is an American artist, illustrator and art director living and working in Los Angeles, California. She became known through her art exhibitions, as well as for her contributions to the making of individual and collective art installations and murals worldwide. As a book author, her curatorial review of contemporary ceramics and its methods The New Age of Ceramics has received distinct attention in specialized art sources. Stouffer also acted as curator and designer of illuminated works Lust for Light, printed and distributed by Gingko Press.

== Biography ==
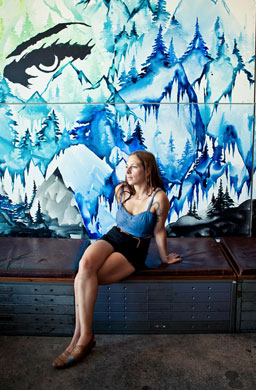
Hannah Stouffer Installation View, Brooklyn, NY, 2012

Born in Aspen, Colorado, Stouffer is the daughter of the wildlife cinematographer Marty Stouffer, of Wild America, and his wife Diane. Stouffer attained a BFA in Conceptual Information Arts at San Francisco State University with courses at San Francisco's California College of Art. Her artwork has been reviewed in art magazines and blogs, and been exhibited in many art galleries, and museums such as the Aspen Art Museum, Dallas Museum of Art, and the Japanese American Art Museum. Stouffer's artwork has been found fragile, decorative, delicate, demonically inspired, and attractively twisted. Her works on paper are often hand-drawn in ink occasionally incorporating gouache and watercolors.

Her solo shows include the exhibitions Myth, presented at Belljar in San Francisco (2011); Internal Energy at the Slow Culture Gallery in Los Angeles (2014), and Omens & Offerings at the RVCA Artist Network Program in San Francisco (2015).

She has also acted as curator for multiple shows and events during Art Basel, Miami, including Basel Castle, Iridescence and at The Electric Pickle in Miami (2013); jointly showing with Johnny Vampotna at the Ghost Room Gallery in Miami (2014), and with Hillary White at Paradigm Gallery in Philadelphia (2015).

She has participated in the making of numerous art installations and murals. Her Installation The Net, exhibited in LA Grand Park in 2018, consisted in a canopy and tunnel of neon lights along the stairs near the fountain, immersing visitors in a wash of color ranging from crisp white to warm purple. As a designer she has helped design different objects like snowboards and technological clothing.

She has been a juror of art shows for the Art Directors Club of Houston, and editorial curator for Create Magazine. She has been interviewed many times to speak about her art.

In 2015, Stouffer founded H+ Creative, a woman owned and operated boutique creative studio representing a tight-knit roster of top-tier, diverse international artists.

== Books ==
- Juxtapoz New Contemporary, Hannah Stouffer (editor, 2013) ISBN 978-1584234661
- Juxtapoz Psychedelic, Gingko Press (2013) ISBN 978-1584235415. Reviewed by Henrik Dahl.
- The New Age of Ceramics, Gingko Press (2016) ISBN 978-1584236245. Reviews in several sources.
- Lust for Light: Illuminated Works, Gingko Press (2018) ISBN 978-1584236818.
