= Neil Argo =

American composer (1947–2018)

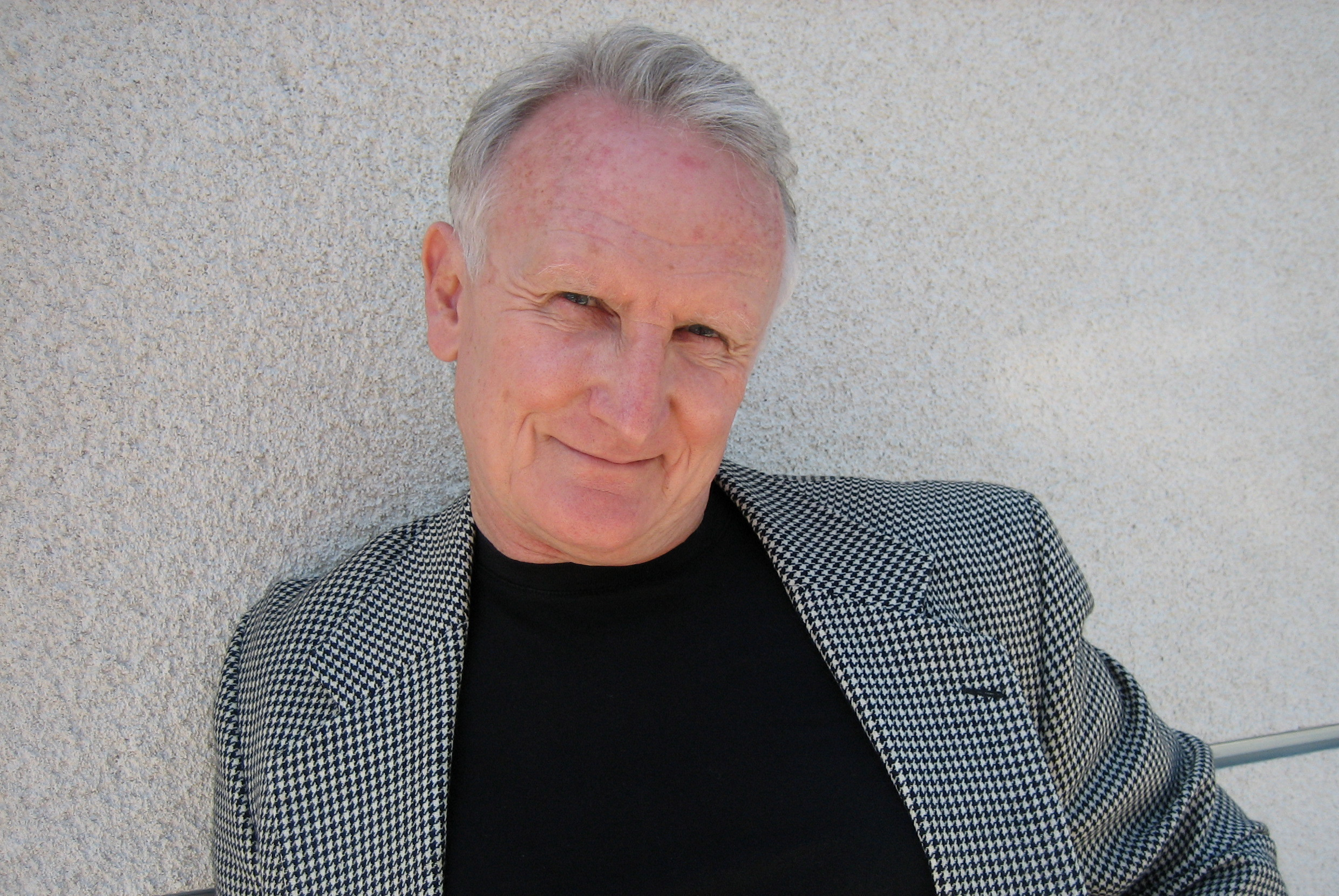
- Born: Neil Douglas Argo Jr. May 28, 1947; San Diego, California, U.S.
- Died: August 2, 2018 (aged 71); Scottsdale, Arizona, U.S.
- Education: University of North Texas
- Years active: 1981-2018
- Website: neilargo.com

Neil Argo (May 28, 1947 – August 2, 2018) was an American composer for film and television working in Hollywood. He is most known for his work on the nature television series Wild America.

== Early life ==
Argo was born in San Diego, California, on May 28, 1947. He studied piano and percussion in high school, and enlisted in the United States Air Force in 1966. After his military duty with the North American Air Defense Band, he attended the University of North Texas, and received a Bachelors of Music degree in music composition. Subsequently, he received a Masters of Music degree in theory and composition from the University of Northern Colorado.

== Career ==
While in Colorado, Argo was introduced to Marty Stouffer in Aspen in 1981. Stouffer had a new television series in the making, Wild America for PBS. Argo composed the series theme and scored early episodes. He was awarded the first composer-in-residence grant in 1984 from the Colorado Council on the Arts, funded by The National Endowment for the Arts. His theme for Wild America was later orchestrated into a six-minute concert band overture, and was published in 2002 by Ludwig Music Publishers of Ohio. In 1983, the Denver Center for the Performing Arts contracted Argo to write and produce the Denver Center for Performing Arts signature theme.

In 1985, he relocated to Los Angeles, California, where initially he worked as an orchestrator on Dynasty, The Colbys and later, MacGyver through Paramount television and later composed for the return television series Mission: Impossible. He wrote additional music for Beverly Hills 90210. In 1988, Argo also scored Andy Tennant's short film, The Cat Story.

He composed the score for the National Geographic's Special, Survivors of the Skeleton Coast (1993), which gave him the opportunity to score the London-based, five-part mini-series Skeleton Coast Safari (1997). In 1998, Argo received the Contribution to the Arts Award by the Alumni Association of the University of Northern Colorado. That same year he donated many of his music manuscripts to the James Michener Library, Greeley, Colorado.

Argo's film scores included Chavez Cage of Glory with Steven Bauer (2013), The Legends of Nethiah with Robert Picardo (2012), Chasing the Green with William Devane (2009), Bring Him Home with Ed Asner (2000), "P.J." with John Heard (2008), among others.

From 2010 to 2012, Argo collaborated with Jimmy Greenspoon, band member of Three Dog Night, on various film projects. Kronos Records released Argo's soundtrack from the motion picture P.J. in November 2014. The Wild America soundtrack was released in October 2015, also on the Kronos Label.

== Other ==
In addition to his work in film and television, Argo taught orchestration and film scoring at California State University at Northridge, and had been a guest lecturer at several colleges and universities in the United States. He was a member of the Academy of Television Arts and Sciences, the Media Task Force at Biola University, the Society of Composers and Lyricists, the American Society of Composers, Authors and Publishers, BMI, the American Federation of Musicians and The Recording Academy's Producers and Engineers Wing.

== Death ==
Neil Argo died in Scottsdale, Arizona, on August 2, 2018, from heart failure. He was 71 years old.

== Partial filmography ==
| Year | Work |
|---|---|
| 1981 | Dynasty |
| 1984 | Zebulon Pike and the Blue Mountain |
| 1985 | MacGyver |
| 1986 | Hush Little Baby Don't You Cry |
| 1987 | The Colby's |
| 1987 | Hotel |
| 1988 | The Cat Story |
| 1988-1990 | Mission: Impossible |
| 1992 | Hearts are Wild |
| 1993 | Storytellers of Lincoln County |
| 1993 | National Geographic Specials |
| 1982-1994 | Wild America |
| 1995 | Un Incontro (An Encounter) |
| 1995 | National Geographic Explorer |
| 1995 | CBS Schoolbreak Special |
| 1997 | Skeleton Coast Safari |
| 1997 | Santa Monica: A Community of Caring |
| 2000 | Bring Him Home |
| 2003 | The Last Leaf |
| 2003 | Her Knight |
| 2005 | Mavet |
| 2006 | Girl with Gun |
| 2007 | Perfect Red |
| 2008 | P.J. |
| 2008 | Warriors... In Their Own Words |
| 2009 | Chasing the Green |
| 2009 | Little Boba |
| 2010 | Cult 11 |
| 2011 | Machete |
| 2011 | A Sister's Call |
| 2012 | The Legends of Nethiah |
| 2013 | Eduardo and Ted |
| 2013 | Chavez Cage of Glory |
| 2014 | Restoration of Paradise |

== Awards ==
| Year | Work | |
|---|---|---|
| 2006 | Park City Film Music Festival - Silver Medal for Excellence | Girl with Gun |
| 2007 | Park City Film Music Festival - Silver Medal for Excellence | Mavet |
| 2008 | Park City Film Music Festival - Bronze Medal for Excellence | P.J. |
| 2008 | Park City Film Music Festival - Silver Medal for Excellence | Perfect Red |
| 2009 | Park City Film Music Festival - Gold Medal for Excellence | Chasing the Green |
| 2010 | Park City Film Music Festival - Silver Medal for Excellence | Cult 11 |
| 2010 | Park City Film Music Festival - Bronze Medal for Excellence | Cult 11 |
