= Wild America (film) =

1997 film by William Dear

- Theatrical release poster
- Directed by: William Dear
- Written by: David Michael Wieger
- Produced by: James G. Robinson; Irby Smith; Mark Stouffer
- Starring: Jonathan Taylor Thomas; Devon Sawa; Scott Bairstow
- Cinematography: David Burr
- Edited by: O. Nicholas Brown; Stuart Pappé
- Music by: Joel McNeely
- Production company: Morgan Creek Productions
- Distributed by: Warner Bros.
- Release date: July 2, 1997
- Running time: 106 minutes
- Country: United States
- Language: English
- Budget: $17 million
- Box office: $7.3 million

Wild America is a 1997 American adventure comedy film directed by William Dear, written by David Michael Wieger, and starring Jonathan Taylor Thomas, Devon Sawa, and Scott Bairstow. The film is based on the lives of three Stouffer brothers, Marty, Mark, and Marshall, and their journey in creating the PBS wildlife documentary program of the same name. The film was released by Warner Bros. on July 2, 1997 to negative reviews from critics, and the film was a box office bomb as it grossed $7.3 million against a $17 million budget.

== Plot ==
In the summer of 1967, Marshall Stouffer is chased in Fort Smith, Arkansas, by his two older brothers, Mark and Marty; the brothers love using Marshall to film him in stunts, which he dislikes. Occasionally, Marty and Mark will show footage of their antics in their garage to all their friends. Marshall repeatedly and secretly gets even with his brothers by pulling revenge pranks of his own, like cleaning the toilet with his brothers' toothbrushes and filling their canteens with downstream river water into which they had been urinating.

Mark and Marty have a dream of filming dangerous animals around the country, and the dream starts when they find a rare, special camera in a shop where they have their films developed. Despite their father Marty Sr.'s insistence that they cannot afford the camera, he relents after their mother, Agnes, says she will give them her Hawaii "vacation" money that she has been saving for several years. Marty and Mark purchase the camera & begin planning their trip. Their father is against this idea.

The three brothers start camping. First, they miss a shot at catching an eagle, then they go to film some alligators, and start by seeing a man who was attacked by an alligator. As they go in a swamp on a boat, Mark throws some bait, but it lands in the trees. Trying to retrieve it, his clothing gets stuck in a branch underwater and he starts to drown. Marshall and Marty drive the boat and try to save him, but it crashes into another branch, which sends Marshall flying into the water. Marshall gets a knife from Marty and cuts Mark loose, but Marshall is now dealing with a bigger problem: he and the alligator are face to face. However, Marshall is able to get back on the boat in time. When they get back to the hut, the alligator man (Strango) tells them about how back when he served in the Korean War, he befriended a fellow soldier named Phil. Strango and Phil would exchange stories about their wilderness adventures. Strango would talk about hunting alligators and Phil would tell tall tales about bears. This rouses Marty's attention and he asks about it. Strango states that Phil was talking about a cave full of hundreds of bears somewhere "out west".

The boys drive northwest until they reach Devil's Playground in Colorado, "the last home of the wild American wolf." Devil's Playground is located on government protected land. They catch footage of a wolf creeping up on a doe. Then, as the wolf is about to ambush the doe, there is a series of explosions. The brothers look up and see two F-4 Phantoms flying overhead. The pilots see the brothers and turn around, firing missiles at them, eventually hitting a giant boulder knocking the three down. As they get up, a herd of wild horses comes thundering towards them. They get in the truck just in time to film it. When the horses pass, Marshall sees an owl that looks a lot like his owl Leona. The three follow it and discover a cave. On the wall of the cave is an ancient Indian drawing of a cave filled with bear-shaped figures. Marty and Mark draw it on Marshall's chest and show it to an old Native American woman. The woman tells them that it is located near Arapaho Peak in Montana.

After a strange man saves Marshall after going down the stream, he too tells the brothers about the cave and where it is. During the journey, they meet a woman whose husband was killed by bears. When returning to their van, they discovered they had been robbed, but they still got the film. Mark breaks his leg after getting into a fight with Marty. Despite his injury, they continue seeking the bear cave. Upon discovering it, they come across a rattlesnake den, then they begin filming while the bears are asleep, but the bears wake after some bat guano lands on one of the photography lamps. Luckily, the brothers know a song that puts the bears to sleep, allowing the brothers to escape with the camera. Upon returning home, Marshall learns his father never flew the plane and things start going downhill when the brothers' father gets injured and is in the hospital, causing the boys and their mother to do the work on their own.

The next day, Marshall flies the plane, but Leon jumps in and helps. After flying it, his father ends up being impressed with him. Later, they display their film at the school gym, and everyone claps, but when their adversarial affiliate DC makes a rude comment, their dad begins to applaud, having the crowd cheer and clap. DC, who had always been a "devil's advocate" from the beginning, becomes the only one who wants his money back, which he gets from Marty Sr., while everyone else compliments all of the brothers. Marshall and his father smile at each other.

== Cast ==
- Jonathan Taylor Thomas as Marshall Stouffer
- Devon Sawa as Mark Stouffer, Marshall's older brother
- Scott Bairstow as Marty Stouffer Jr., Marshall's oldest brother
- Frances Fisher as Agnes Stouffer, Marshall's mother
- Jamey Sheridan as Marty Stouffer Sr., Marshall's father
- Tracey Walter as Leon, the Stouffers' farmhand and neighbor
- Don Stroud as Stango
- Zack Ward as D.C., who is really more of a punk affiliate rather than friend of the Stouffer brothers. He often just likes to get involved with them over matters that involve danger.
- Claudia Stedelin as Annie
- Danny Glover as Bigfoot the Mountain Man (uncredited), whom the Stouffer brothers met during their journey.

== Reception ==
Wild America grossed $7.3 million.

Rotten Tomatoes, a review aggregator, reports that 29% of 21 surveyed critics gave the film a positive review; the average rating is 4.5/10. The site's consensus states: "Wild America has the appearance of an old-school wilderness adventure, but lacks an involving story to anchor all the outdoor action."

== Home media ==
This film was released on VHS by Warner Home Video on October 8, 1997. This film has been released on DVD by Warner Home Video on June 20, 2004, with Captions, Inc. Los Angeles English subtitle deaf for hearing impaired.
