= Jonathan Taylor Thomas =

American actor and director (born 1981)

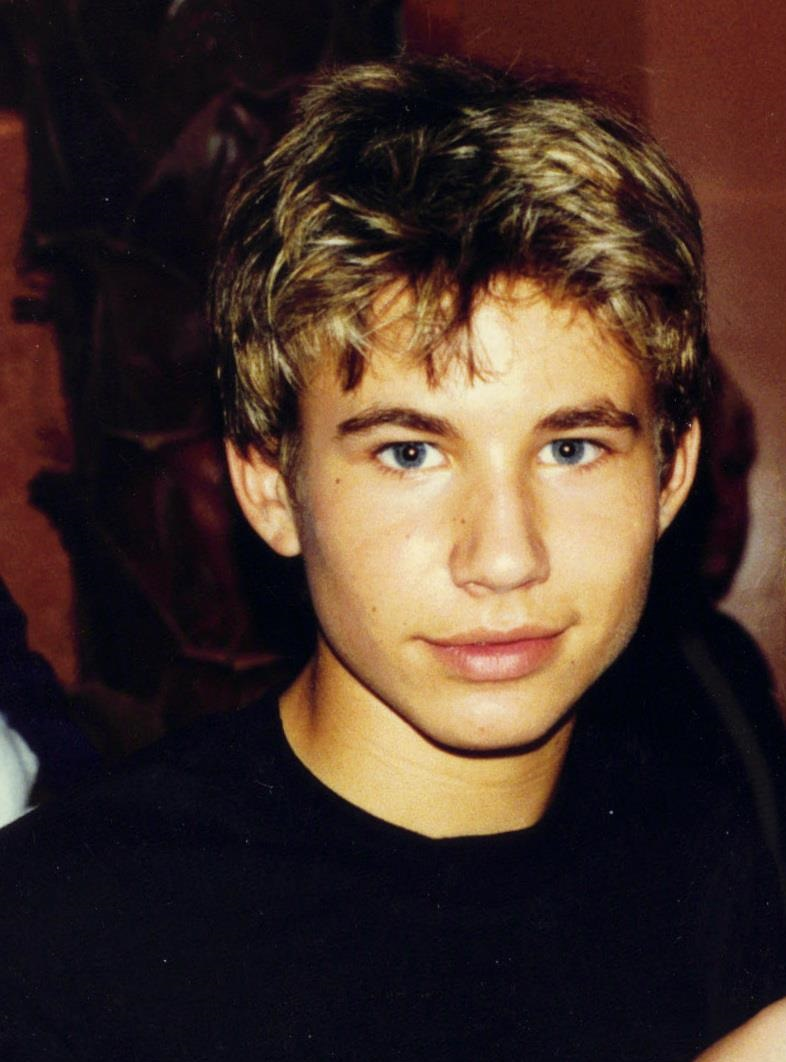
- Thomas in 1998
- Born: Jonathan Taylor Weiss; September 8, 1981 (age 45); Bethlehem, Pennsylvania, U.S.
- Education: Harvard University; Columbia University (BA); University of St Andrews
- Occupations: Actor; director
- Years active: 1990–2006, 2013–2016
- Relatives: Jeff Weiss (uncle)

Jonathan Taylor Thomas (né Weiss; born September 8, 1981) is an American actor and director. He is known for portraying Randy Taylor on Home Improvement (1991–1998), Pinocchio in the film The Adventures of Pinocchio (1996), and voicing young Simba in the animated film The Lion King (1994).

== Early life and education ==
Thomas was born Jonathan Taylor Weiss on September 8, 1981, in Bethlehem, Pennsylvania, to Claudine (née Thomas) and Stephen Weiss, and later moved to Sacramento, California, and then to Los Angeles. He has an older brother, Joel (born in 1978), who works for Texas–Pan American Broncs as an assistant coach for the men's basketball team in Edinburg, Texas. Thomas's paternal uncle was playwright and actor Jeff Weiss (1940–2022). Thomas has Pennsylvania Dutch and Portuguese ancestry. His parents divorced when he was 10.

In 2000, Thomas enrolled at Harvard University, where he studied philosophy and history and spent his third year abroad at the University of St Andrews in Scotland. In 2010, he graduated from the School of General Studies at Columbia University.

== Career ==
=== Television ===
Thomas began his television career in 1990, playing the role of Kevin Brady, the son of Greg Brady, on The Bradys, a spin-off of the 1970s TV show The Brady Bunch. After this appearance, he took the professional name Jonathan Taylor Thomas replacing his legal last name with his mother's maiden name.

In 1991, Thomas appeared in three episodes of Fox's sketch comedy series In Living Color. That same year, he was cast as middle son Randy Taylor on ABC's sitcom Home Improvement. Despite looking much younger, in reality, Thomas was a month older than Zachery Ty Bryan who played his elder brother Brad. Thomas remained with Home Improvement well into his teenage years but left the show in 1998 to focus on academics, and was only involved in three episodes of the final season.

Since departing Home Improvement, Thomas has acted only occasionally. In early 2004, he had a small guest role on 8 Simple Rules, another ABC sitcom, and appeared in The WB's Smallville in 2002 and 2004. In 2005, Thomas appeared in UPN's high school detective drama Veronica Mars and was also featured on the E! True Hollywood Story episode on Home Improvement.

On March 22, 2013, Thomas guest-starred on the second-season finale of his third ABC sitcom, Last Man Standing, and again in the fourth episode of the third season on October 11, 2013, reuniting with Tim Allen, his TV father from Home Improvement. On January 10, 2015, he had a small cameo on the twelfth episode of the fourth season of Last Man Standing, reuniting with both of his TV parents from Home Improvement, Tim Allen and Patricia Richardson.

Thomas directed three episodes of Last Man Standing between 2013 and 2016.

Since 2017, Thomas has served as a national board member of the media labor union SAG-AFTRA.

=== Film ===
Thomas appeared in many films during and after his run on Home Improvement. He had a few roles as a voice actor in his child years, including Disney's animated feature The Lion King, in which he voiced the protagonist Simba as a cub.

He also appeared in live-action films. Among the ones he starred in are those from Disney: Man of the House, Tom and Huck, and I'll Be Home for Christmas. Other live-action films starring Thomas are an adaptation of The Adventures of Pinocchio (in which he played and voiced the titular character), Wild America, Speedway Junky, and Walking Across Egypt.

== Filmography ==
=== Film ===
Year	Title	Role	Notes
1994	The Lion King	Young Simba	Voice role
1994	Pom Poko	Shoukichi	Voice role (2005 Disney dub)
1995	Man of the House	Ben Archer	
1995	Tom and Huck	Tom Sawyer	
1996	The Adventures of Pinocchio	Pinocchio	Voice role
1997	Wild America	Marshall Stouffer	
1998	I Woke Up Early the Day I Died	Boy at Beach	
1998	I'll Be Home for Christmas	Jake Wilkinson	
1998	The Emperor's New Clothes: An All-Star Illustrated Retelling of the Classic Fairy Tale	The Imperial Prince	Voice role
1999	Speedway Junky	Steve	
1999	Walking Across Egypt	Wesley Benfield	
2000	Common Ground	Tobias Anderson	
2000	The Tangerine Bear: Home in Time for Christmas!	Tangie	Voice role; TV movie
2000	Timothy Tweedle the First Christmas Elf	Timothy Tweedle	TV movie
2001	An American Town	Rafe	TV movie
2005	Tilt-A-Whirl	Customer #3	Short film
2005	Thru the Moebius Strip	Prince Ragis	Voice role

=== Television ===
Year	Title	Role	Notes
1989–1993	The Adventures of Spot	Spot	Voice role; 26 episodes; (1989–1993 American version)
1990	The Bradys	Kevin Brady	5 episodes
1991	In Living Color	Macaulay Culkin	1 episode
1991–1998	Home Improvement	Randy Taylor	179 episodes
1994	The Itsy Bitsy Spider	George	Voice role; Episode: "Spider Sense"
1996	The Oz Kids	Scarecrow Jr.	Voice role
2000	Ally McBeal	Chris Emerson	Episode: "Do You Wanna Dance?"
2000–2001	The Wild Thornberrys	Tyler Tucker	Voice role; 6 episodes
2002–2004	Smallville	Ian Randall	2 episodes
2003	The Simpsons	Luke Stetson	Voice role; Episode: "Dude, Where's My Ranch?"
2004	8 Simple Rules	Jeremy	3 episodes
2005	Veronica Mars	Ben	Episode: "Weapons of Class Destruction"
2013–2015	Last Man Standing	John Baker / Randy	4 episodes

=== Video games ===
Year	Title	Role	Notes
1996	The Adventures of Pinocchio	Human Pinocchio	
2006	Kingdom Hearts II	Young Simba	Archive audio

=== Production credits ===
Year	Title	Position	Notes
2006	The Extra	Director	Short film
2013–2016	Last Man Standing	Director	3 episodes

== Awards and nominations ==
=== Wins ===
- 1994 – Youth in Film Award for Outstanding Youth Ensemble in a Television Series (Home Improvement)
- 1996 – ShoWest Award for Young Star of the Year
- 1997 – Youth in Film Award for Best Performance in a Voiceover: Young Artist (The Adventures of Pinocchio)
- 1998 – Kids' Choice Awards: Blimp Award for Favorite Television Actor (Home Improvement)
- 1999 – Kids' Choice Awards: Hall of Fame Award

=== Nominations ===
- 1993 – Youth in Film Awards: Best Young Actor Starring in a Television Series (Home Improvement)
- 1995 – Academy of Science Fiction, Fantasy and Horror Films: Saturn Award for Best Performance by a Younger Actor (The Lion King)
- 1995 – Youth in Film Awards: Best Performance by a Young Actor in a Voiceover – TV or Movie (The Lion King)
- 1996 – Youth in Film Awards: Best Young Leading Actor – Feature Film (Tom and Huck)
- 1996 – Kids' Choice Awards: Blimp Award for Favorite Movie Actor (Tom and Huck)
- 1997 – Kids' Choice Awards: Blimp Award for Favorite Television Actor (Home Improvement)
- 1997 – Academy of Science Fiction, Fantasy and Horror Films: Saturn Award for Best Performance by a Younger Actor (The Adventures of Pinocchio)
- 1997 – YoungStar Awards: Best Performance by a Young Actor in a Comedy TV Series (Home Improvement)
- 1997 – YoungStar Awards: Best Performance by a Young Actor in a Comedy Film (Tom and Huck)
- 1998 – YoungStar Awards for Best Performance by a Young Actor in a Comedy TV Series (Home Improvement)
- 1999 – Kids' Choice Awards: Blimp Award for Favorite TV Actor (Home Improvement)
