= Wild America (TV series) =

- Genre: Documentary
- Created by: Marty Stouffer
- Directed by: Marty Stouffer
- Presented by: Marty Stouffer
- Country of origin: United States
- Original language: English
- No. of seasons: 12
- No. of episodes: 120

Production
- Executive producer: Marty Stouffer
- Running time: 30 minutes
- Production company: Marty Stouffer Productions

Original release
- Network: PBS
- Release: 1982 – 1994

Wild America is a documentary television series that focuses on the wild animals and wild lands of North America. By the mid-1970s, Marty Stouffer had put together several full-length documentaries that were licensed as prime time network television specials. At that time, he approached the programming managers at Public Broadcasting Service (PBS) about a half-hour-long wildlife series, the first to focus exclusively upon the flora and fauna of North America. PBS signed for the rights to broadcast Marty Stouffer's series Wild America in 1981. The series went on to become one of the most popular aired by PBS, renowned for its unflinching portrayal of nature, as well as its extensive use of film techniques such as slow motion and close-ups. Stouffer earned as much as $250,000 per show from PBS.

The show's production ran from 1982 to 1994. The series is no longer on PBS; reruns still air in syndication on commercial television through much of the United States. In 1997, Warner Bros. released a full-length feature film of the same name, which was based on the biographical story of Marty Stouffer and his brothers, Mark and Marshall. The show is now distributed by Storrs Media and Telco Productions for Syndication.

== Episodes ==
The "Wild America" series contained a total of 120 half-hour episodes.

#	Episode	Season
S1	E1	Watching Wildlife
S1	E2	Swamp Critters
S1	E3	Wild Dogs
S1	E4	Mountain Monarchs
S1	E5	Time of the Grizzly
S1	E6	At the Crossroads
S1	E7	Bighorn
S1	E8	The Wolf and the Whitetail
S1	E9	Living with Wildlife
S1	E10	Wild Babies
S2	E1	Animal Oddities
S2	E2	Born to Run
S2	E3	Owls: Lords of Darkness
S2	E4	Hog Wild
S2	E5	Antlered Kingdom
S2	E6	Wild Wings
S2	E7	Wild Cats
S2	E8	The Man Who Loved Bears Part 1
S2	E9	The Man Who Loved Bears Part 2
S2	E10	Backyard Wildlife
S3	E1	All American Animals
S3	E2	Feathered Jewels
S3	E3	Ringtailed Rascals
S3	E4	Canyon Creatures
S3	E5	Wolverine Country
S3	E6	Fascinating Fishes
S3	E7	Wild Refuge
S3	E8	Fishers in the Family Part 1
S3	E9	Fishers in the Family Part 2
S3	E10	Photographing Wildlife
S4	E1	North Woods Lynx
S4	E2	Woodpeckers: Nature's Hammerheads
S4	E3	Designs for Defense
S4	E4	Cutthroat: Yellowstone Lake
S4	E5	Cutthroat: Yellowstone River
S4	E6	Cutthroat: Grizzly Creek
S4	E7	Killer Mice
S4	E8	Controversial Coyote
S4	E9	Remarkable Reptiles
S4	E10	Tracking Wildlife
S5	E1	Pennsylvania Whitetail
S5	E2	Woodies and Hoodies
S5	E3	King of Snakes
S5	E4	Family Feud
S5	E5	River of the Bears
S5	E6	Wild Texas
S5	E7	A Prairie Park
S5	E8	The Grouse and the Goshawk
S5	E9	Otters of the Adirondacks
S5	E10	Growing Up Wild
S6	E1	Swamp Bear Part 1
S6	E2	Swamp Bear Part 2
S6	E3	Beautiful Blues
S6	E4	Timberdoodles of Moosehorn
S6	E5	Minnesota Mink
S6	E6	Season of the Seals
S6	E7	Wild Turkey Part 1
S6	E8	Wild Turkey Part 2
S6	E9	Snakedance
S6	E10	Managing Wildlife
S7	E1	Cliffhangers
S7	E2	White on White
S7	E3	Family of Foxes
S7	E4	Peculiar Plants
S7	E5	A Multitude of Mollusks
S7	E6	Marmot Mountain
S7	E7	Old Man Muskrat
S7	E8	Chipmunks of Yosemite
S7	E9	Bobcat
S7	E10	Evergreen
S8	E1	Bushytails
S8	E2	Cottontails and Kin
S8	E3	Birds of Peace
S8	E4	Birds of Prey
S8	E5	Weasels Sleek and Savage Part 1
S8	E6	Weasels Sleek and Savage Part 2
S8	E7	Olympic Odyssey
S8	E8	Badlands
S8	E9	Shenandoah Springtime
S8	E10	Attracting Wildlife
S9	E1	Valley of the Elk
S9	E2	Dancers of the Dawn
S9	E3	The Incredible Shrew
S9	E4	Pretty as a Quail
S9	E5	Meet the Marten
S9	E6	Beneficial Bats
S9	E7	Birds of a Feather
S9	E8	Call to Courtship
S9	E9	A Nest is Best
S9	E10	Shades of Gray
S10	E1	The First Ten Years
S10	E2	Magnificent as a Moose
S10	E3	Truth About Turtles
S10	E4	Prince of the Pond
S10	E5	The Prickly Porcupine
S10	E6	Those Smelly Skunks
S10	E7	The Amazing Armadillo
S10	E8	In the Forest
S10	E9	Whitebark
S10	E10	Kids and Critters
S11	E1	Billion Dollar Bass
S11	E2	The Beauty of Butterflies
S11	E3	Belligerent as a Badger
S11	E4	Headgear
S11	E5	A Tale About Tails
S11	E6	Some Feet Have Noses
S11	E7	The Eyes Have It
S11	E8	Colors in Nature
S11	E9	Wild Wyoming
S11	E10	Home is Where There's Habitat
S12	E1	Zoom in on Wildflowers
S12	E2	Year of the Mustang Part 1
S12	E3	Year of the Mustang Part 2
S12	E4	Queen of the Ice
S12	E5	X Rated Imports
S12	E6	Wings Over the Marsh
S12	E7	People of the Bison
S12	E8	Cute as a Cub
S12	E9	Just Little Varmints
S12	E10	The Bill Makes the Bird

Special episodes

Special	Year
The Predators	1979
Our Favorite Animals	1992
Great Escapes	1993
Spectacular Showdowns	1994
Dangerous Encounters	1995
Wild Wings	1996
Fantastic Follies	1996
Wacky Babies	1997
Amazing Legends	1998
Tender Times	2001
Marty's World	2004
Deadly Beauty	2005
