= Marty Stouffer =

American narrator and producer (born 1948)

- Born: Martin Luther Stouffer Jr. September 5, 1948 (age 77); Fort Smith, Arkansas
- Notable work: Wild America
- Children: Hannah Dale Stouffer, Luke Martin Stouffer
- Website: Wild America

Martin Luther Stouffer Jr. (born September 5, 1948) is the narrator and producer of the wildlife and nature documentary television program Wild America that originally aired on Public Broadcasting Service (PBS) in the 1980s.

Stouffer was born and raised in Fort Smith, Arkansas. His name has been legally changed to Marty Stouffer. Along with his brother, Mark, he also produced the TV series of John Denver specials for ABC in the late 1970s and early 1980s. Another half-dozen one-hour Specials for the National Geographic Society were also produced during that same time period. Stouffer's special "The Predators" was narrated by Robert Redford and his special "The Man Who Loved Bears" was narrated by Will Geer and Henry Fonda.

== Early influences ==
At age 19, Stouffer traveled to Alaska on his own with a Super 8 mm movie camera. He returned home to a warm reception by an audience of 1,800 local Arkansas residents in the Fort Smith Municipal Auditorium who turned out to view what was basically a home movie. To that audience he first aired an unsophisticated movie of his adventure in the North, paid for his summer vacation many times over, and easily made an early decision to spend his life creating many more such productions. Soon after that success and his decision to pursue a career in wildlife film-making, he graduated from college and began his career in earnest. In 1970, Stouffer graduated from the University of Arkansas with a degree in English. From there he traveled to Botswana to spend most of a year filming a feature-length documentary entitled Botswana, Where a River Dies. While in Africa, he was confronted with the often cruel and wasteful killing of animals, political unrest, and human tragedies. As a result, he returned to America with the intention of producing films promoting nature conservation. One of these efforts was The American Wildlife Project.

== Marty Stouffer's Wild America ==
By the mid-1970s, Stouffer had compiled several full-length specials that aired on television as prime time network documentaries. At that time, he approached the programming managers at PBS about a half-hour-long wildlife series. PBS signed for the rights to broadcast Stouffer's series Wild America in 1981. The series almost immediately became one of the most popular aired by PBS, renowned for its unflinching portrayal of nature, as well as its extensive use of unique film techniques such as extreme slow motion, close-ups, and time-lapses through the seasons of the year.

Stouffer's stories, incorporating dramatic "facts of life," and told simply in his home-spun style, won the hearts of a loyal audience. It was one of PBS's most highly rated regular series, never leaving the top ten, and in more than one year, it was the number one highest rated regular series to air on the network. It remains the most-broadcast series which has ever aired on public television. At the time, it was common for producers to limit the number of broadcasts to 4 airings over a period of 3 years. Stouffer saw no good reason for that limitation and he was the first producer to offer unlimited broadcasts of the series by the network. Many of the 260 PBS stations chose to broadcast the programs multiple times each day throughout the weeks. In some weeks, according to Nielsen ratings, it was viewed by more than 450 million viewers. It has amassed sales of videos, both VHS and DVD, totaling more than $60 million. In March 2015, Stouffer attempted to finance a 4K resolution remastering of Wild America via a Kickstarter campaign. The Kickstarter ended in failure March 18, 2015, having raised only $3,410 of the target $1,250,000 (0.27%) and amassing just 39 backers.

=== Film adaptation ===
The lives of Marty Stouffer and his brothers, Mark and Marshall, in their hometown of Fort Smith, Arkansas, were later adapted for the film Wild America in 1997. Headlined by Home Improvement child star Jonathan Taylor Thomas and directed by William Dear, the film dramatized how the three boys became intrigued with the production of their wildlife documentaries. Both Mark and Marshall are filmmakers as well.

== Controversy and ethics ==
In 1993, Stouffer was fined $3,000 in a Federal court in Grand Junction, Colorado for building a camp on public land. In 1995 or early 1996, Stouffer was fined $362,000 by a jury in a civil lawsuit for illegally cutting a six-mile trail through property owned by the Aspen Center for Environmental Studies in Colorado to access Stouffer's camp on Forest Service land; Stouffer was attempting to gain better access to an elk migration path by building the trail.

In 1996, multiple employees of Stouffer reported that many of the scenes in his films had been staged.

== Lawsuit against National Geographic ==
In December 2018, Stouffer filed a lawsuit against National Geographic in the U.S. District Court for the District of Colorado. The suit alleges that several shows on the National Geographic Channel and Nat Geo Wild have used titles, episode structures and filming styles that directly emulate those of "Wild America". According to Stouffer, these were implemented after National Geographic backed out of a licensing deal with him. The case number is 1:18-CV-3127. The case was dismissed with prejudice in 2020.
