= Kim (given name) =

- Pronunciation: English: /kɪm/ Russian: [kʲim]
- Gender: Unisex

Origin
- Origin: multiple

Kim is a unisex given name. It is also used as a diminutive or nickname for names such as Kimber, Kimberly, Kimberley, Kimball and Kimiko. In Kenya, it is short for various male names such as Kimutai and Kimani. In Vietnam, it is also a unisex name.

== History ==
A notable use of the name was the fictional street urchin Kimball O'Hara in Rudyard Kipling's book Kim, published in 1901. The name is also found in the opening of Edna Ferber's 1926 novel Show Boat, whose female protagonist, Magnolia names her baby daughter Kim; the name was inspired by the convergence of the three states Kentucky, Illinois, and Missouri – where the child was born.

From the 1900s to the 1960s, the name Kim was mainly given to boys, despite the use of this name for both male and female characters in popular literature and, later, movies of the time. In Scandinavia, Kim can more often be used as a male name in its own right, being a common short form of Joakim.

In Russia Ким (Kim) is a diminutive/nickname of Ioakim (Russian: Иоаким), "Joachim". Its popularity in the early Soviet era was due to being reinterpreted as the acronym for Коммунистический Интернационал Молодежи (Kommunistichesky Internatsional Molodyozhi, Young Communist International).

== People ==
=== A ===
- Kim Aas (born 1970), Danish politician
- Kim Amb (born 1990), Swedish track and field athlete
- Kim Anderzon (1943–2014), Swedish actress
- Kim Appleby (born 1961), English singer
- Kim Atienza (born 1967), Filipino entertainer

=== B ===
- Kim Barnett (born 1960), former English cricketer
- Kim Basinger (born 1953), American actress
- Kim Batiste (1968–2020), American baseball player
- Kim Beattie (born 1998), British gymnast
- Kim Beazley Sr. (1917–2007), Australian politician
- Kim Beazley (born 1948), Australian politician
- Kim Becker, American politician
- Kim Bodnia (born 1965), Danish actor and director
- Kim Boekbinder, Canadian musician
- Kim Bokamper (born 1954), American former professional football player
- Kim Brooks (born 1968), American Voice actress
- Kim Boutin (born 1994), Canadian short track speed skater

=== C ===
- Kim Cadzow (born 2001, New Zealand racing cyclist
- Kim Campbell (born 1947), Canadian politician
- Kim Carnes (born 1945), American singer
- Kim Carr (born 1955), Australian former politician
- Kim Cascone (born 1955), Italian American electronic music composer
- Kim Cattrall (born 1956), Canadian actress
- Kim Chambers (born 1974), American pornographic actress
- Kim Chiu (born 1990), Filipino actress and singer
- Kim Chizevsky-Nicholls (born 1968), American professional bodybuilder
- Kim Clijsters (born 1983), Belgian former professional tennis player
- Kim Cloutier (born 1987), Canadian-American model
- Kim Coates (born 1958), Canadian actor

=== D ===
- Kim Deal (born 1961), American musician
- Kim Deitch (born 1944), American cartoonist
- Kim Yi Dionne (born 1977), American political scientist
- Kim Domingo (born 1995), Filipino entertainer

=== E ===
- Kim Eagles (born 1976), Canadian sport shooter
- Kim English (1970–2019), American singer
- Kim English (basketball) (born 1988), American former basketball player

=== F ===
- Kim Fields (born 1969), American actress

=== G ===
- Kim Gannon (1900–1974), American songwriter
- Kim Gevaert (born 1978), Belgian former sprinter
- Kim Gordon (born 1953), American musician
- Kim Grant (footballer) (born 1972), Ghanaian former footballer
- Kim Green (racing driver), British-Australian former racing driver
- Kim Grant (tennis) (born 1971), South African former tennis player
- Kim Guadagno (born 1959), American politician and lawyer

=== H ===
- Kim Hagger (born 1961), English retired heptathlete and long jumper
- Kim Henkel (born 1946), American screenwriter and director
- Kim Hirschovits (born 1982), Finnish former ice hockey player
- Kim Hughes (born 1954), Australian former cricketer
- Kim Huybrechts (born 1985), Belgian darts player

=== J ===
- Kim James, American politician
- Kim Johnsson (born 1976), Swedish ice hockey defenceman
- Kim Jones (disambiguation), several people

=== K ===
- Kim Källström (born 1982), Swedish former professional footballer
- Kim Kardashian (born 1980), American personality and businesswoman
- Kim Kataguiri (born 1996), Brazilian politician and activist
- Kim Kilpatrick (born c. 1966), Canadian Paralympic swimmer
- Kim Komando (born 1967), American talk-radio program host

=== L ===
- Kim Larsen (1945–2018), Danish rock and pop musician
- Kim Little (born 1990), Scottish professional footballer
- Kim Ljung (born 1971), Norwegian musician

=== M ===
- Kim Manners (1951–2009), American television director and producer
- Kim Medcalf (born 1973), English actress, singer and model
- Kim Mestdagh (born 1990), Belgian basketball player
- Kim Mitchell (born 1952), Canadian musician
- Kim Molina (born 1991), Filipino singer
- Kim Moyes (born 1976), Australian musician

=== N ===
- Kim Newman (born 1959), English author
- Kim Ng (born 1968), Chinese-American professional baseball executive
- Kim Novak (born 1933), American actress

=== O ===
- Kim O'Brien, American actress

=== P ===
- Kim Peek (1951–2009), American savant
- Kim Perell, American entrepreneur and author
- Kim Petersen (born 1956), Danish singer known as King Diamond
- Kim E. Petersen
- Kim Petras (born 1992), German singer
- Kim Philby (born Harold Philby, 1912–1988), British spy and defector to the Soviet Union

=== R ===
- Kim Rhode (born 1979), American double trap and skeet shooter
- Kim Richards (born 1964), American reality television personality, actress and socialite
- Kim Richards (politician) (born 1971), Australian politician

=== S ===
- Kim Schmitz (born 1974), also known as Kim Dotcom, German-Finnish Internet entrepreneur and political activist
- Kim Simmonds (1947–2022), Welsh musician
- Kim Smith (disambiguation), several people
- Kim Staal (born 1978), Danish former professional ice hockey player
- Kim Stanley Robinson (born 1952), American science fiction writer
- Kim Stolz (born 1983), American fashion model and television personality
- Kim Rossi Stuart (born 1969), Italian actor and director
- Kim Sunna (born 1987), Swedish professional ice hockey player

=== T ===
- Kim Thayil (born 1960), American musician
- Kim Thomas Smith, American politician
- Trần Trọng Kim (1883–1953), Vietnamese scholar and politician

=== U ===
- Kim Johnston Ulrich, American actress

=== V ===
- Kim Marie Vaske (born 2005), German para-athlete
- Kim H. Veltman (1948–2020), Dutch Canadian historian of science and art

=== W ===
- Kim Walker-Smith (born 1981), American singer-songwriter
- Kim Wall, several people
  - Kim Wall (died 2017), freelancer and murder victim
  - Kim Wall (sprinter) (born 1983), British sprinter
  - Kim Wall (actor), British actor
- Kim Warwick (born 1952), Australian former tennis player
- Kim Wayans (born 1961), American actress and comedian
- Kim Weiss (born 1989), American ice hockey coach
- Kim Wilde (born 1960), English singer
- Kim Williams (architect), American independent scholar of architecture and mathematics
- Kim Williams (basketball) (born 1974), American former professional basketball player
- Kim Williams (media executive) (born 1952), Australian media executive
- Kim Williams (songwriter) (1947–2016), American country music songwriter
- Kim A. Williams Sr. (born 1954), American cardiologist
- Kim Woodburn (1942–2025), English television personality and expert cleaner

=== Y ===
- Kim Yashpal, Indian actress and model

=== Z ===
- Kim Zolciak-Biermann (born 1978), American television personality

== Fictional characters ==
- Kim Bauer in the TV series 24
- Kim Butterfield in the soap opera Hollyoaks
- Kim Chang in the British television series Casualty
- Kim Chin in Class of 3000
- Kimball Cho in the American TV series The Mentalist
- Kim Craig in the Australian sitcom Kath & Kim
- Kim Fox in the soap opera EastEnders
- Kim Kitsuragi in the role-playing video game Disco Elysium
- Kim Pine in the series of graphic novels Scott Pilgrim
- Kim Possible, character in the Disney series of the same name
- Kim Tate in the British soap opera Emmerdale
- Kim Wexler in the AMC television series Better Call Saul

== See also ==
- Kim (surname)
- Kim (Korean surname)
- Kim (disambiguation) (other meanings)
- Kym (disambiguation)
