= Kim =

Kim may refer to:

== People and fictional characters ==
- Kim (given name), a list of people and fictional characters
- Kim (surname), a list of people and fictional characters
  - Kim (Korean surname)
    - Kim dynasty (disambiguation), several dynasties
    - Kim family (disambiguation), various Korean families and clans
      - Kim family (North Korea), the rulers of North Korea since Kim Il Sung in 1948
  - Kim, Vietnamese form of Jin (Chinese surname)
- Kim (footballer, born 1933), Brazilian footballer Alcy Martha de Freitas
- Kim (footballer, born 1980), Brazilian footballer Carlos Henrique Dias
- Kim people, an ethnic group of Chad
- Kim Almarcha, professionally known as KIM, a French singer

== Arts, entertainment and media ==
- Kim (album), a 2009 album by Kim Fransson
- "Kim" (song), 2000 song by Eminem
- "Kim", a song by King Combs from Never Stop, 2025
- "Kim", a song by Tkay Maidza, 2021
- Kim (novel), by Rudyard Kipling
  - Kim (1950 film), an American adventure film based on the novel
  - Kim (1984 film), a British film based on the novel
- "Kim" (M*A*S*H), a 1973 episode of the American television show M*A*S*H
- Kim (magazine), a defunct Turkish women's magazine (1992–1999)

== Languages ==
- Kim language, a language of Chad
- Kim language (Sierra Leone), a language of Sierra Leone
- kim, the ISO 639 code of the Tofa language of Russia

== Organizations ==
- Kenya Independence Movement, a defunct political party in Kenya
- Khalifa Islamiyah Mindanao, Filipino terrorist organization
- Kingdom Identity Ministries, a Christian organisation
- Advanced Indonesia Coalition (Koalisi Indonesia Maju/KIM), a political coalition in Indonesia

== Places ==
- Kim, Cameroon, a village in Touboro, Cameroon
- Kim, Chad, a place
- Kim, Gujarat, a town in India
- Kim, Republic of Bashkortostan, a village in Russia
- Kim, Tajikistan, a town
- Kim, Colorado, a town in the United States
- Camp Kim, a military facility in South Korea
- Autonomous Province of Kosovo and Metohija (Serbian: Kosovo i Metohija, KiM), a province in Serbia

== Other uses ==
- Kim (cigarette), a German brand
- Kim (food), Korean seaweed
- List of storms named Kim, several storms with this name
- .kim, top-level internet domain
- KIM-1, a microcomputer
- KIM, IATA code for Kimberley Airport, South Africa

== See also ==
- GIM
- Lil' Kim, American rapper Kimberly Denise Jones (born 1974)
- Kem (disambiguation)
- Khim, a stringed musical instrument
- KIMM (disambiguation)
- Kimm, a surname
- Kym (disambiguation)
