= Sunna =

Sunna has multiple meanings.

It may refer to:

- Sunna, a goddess of the sun in Germanic religion and mythology
- Sunna (band), a British rock band
- Sunna, Bishop of Mérida, an Arian
- Sunna (Saxon chief), a Saxon chief
- Sunna Davíðsdóttir (born 1985), Icelandic mixed martial artist
- Kim Sunna (born 1987), Swedish professional ice hockey player
- Sunna as an alternative spelling of sunnah, a set of traditional customs and practices associated with the Islamic prophet Muhammad and other early Muslim figures
- Sunnah, alias used by Australian rapper of the group Lgeez

== See also ==
- Sunne (disambiguation)
- Sunni (lit. 'followers of the Sunna'), a major branch of Islam
- Suni (disambiguation)
