= Kimm =

Surname of notable baseball player and singers

Kimm is a surname. Notable people with the surname include:

- Bruce Kimm (born 1951), American baseball player, manager and coach
- Cory Kimm (born 1974), Canadian radio personality
- Fiona Kimm, English opera singer

== See also ==
- Polly Carver-Kimm, American television personality
- KIMM (disambiguation)
- Kim (disambiguation)
