= Flanders Open (darts) =

The Flanders Open was a darts tournament that has been held since 2008 until 2010.

== List of winners ==
Year	Champion	Score	Runner-up	Total Prize Money	Champion	Runner-up
2008	(Belgium) Kim Huybrechts	5–2	(Belgium) Geert De Vos	€7,360	€1,600	€800
2009	(England) John Walton	3–1	(England) Steve West	€9,500	€2,500	€1,500
2010	(Netherlands) Fabian Rossenbrand	6–5	(Belgium) Kim Huybrechts	?	€2,500	€1,500
