= KIMM =

KIMM may refer to:

- KIMM (AM), a radio station (1150 AM) licensed to Rapid City, South Dakota, United States
- Korea Institute of Machinery & Material, part of the Korea University of Science and Technology in South Korea
- Original Mountain Marathon (formerly known as the Karrimor International Mountain Marathon)

== See also ==
- Kimm, a surname
- Kim (disambiguation)
