= Kim Jones =

Kim Jones may refer to:

- Kim Jones (runner) (born 1958), American long-distance runner
- Kim Jones (high jumper) (fl. 1990s), American high jumper, 1995 indoor All-American for the North Carolina Tar Heels track and field team
- Kim Jones (artist) (born 1944), American performance artist
- Kim Jones (designer) (born 1979), British menswear designer
- Kim Jones (reporter) (born 1969), American sports reporter
- Kim Jones (businesswoman), American businesswoman
- Kim Jones (digital creative) (born 1987), Australian digital creative
- Kim Jones (American football) (born 1952), American football player
- Kimberly Jones (born 1976), American author
- Kimberly Jones (tennis) (born 1957), American tennis player
- Lil' Kim (born 1974), American rap artist, born Kimberly Jones
