= 2014 Grand Slam of Darts =

2014 Singha Beer Grand Slam of Darts

Tournament information
- Dates: 8–16 November 2014
- Venue: Wolverhampton Civic Hall
- Location: Wolverhampton
- Country: England
- Organisation(s): PDC
- Format: Legs
- Prize fund: £400,000
- Winner's share: £100,000
- Nine-dart finish: (Belgium) Kim Huybrechts
- High checkout: 170 (England) Robbie Green (England) James Wade (England) Dave Chisnall

Champion(s)
- (England) Phil Taylor

The 2014 Singha Beer Grand Slam of Darts, was the eighth staging of the tournament, organised by the Professional Darts Corporation. The event took place from 8–16 November 2014 at the Wolverhampton Civic Hall, Wolverhampton, England.

Phil Taylor was the defending champion and won the title for the a sixth and final time by defeating Dave Chisnall 16–13 in the final.

In his quarter-final victory over Michael van Gerwen, Belgian player Kim Huybrechts threw a nine-dart finish, only the second in the event's history, and the first ever nine-darter on TV by a Belgian player.

== Prize money ==
Position (num. of players)		Prize money (Total: £400,000)
Winner	(1)	£100,000
Runner-up	(1)	£50,000
Semi-finalists	(2)	£25,000
Quarter-finalists	(4)	£15,000
Last 16 (second round)	(8)	£7,500
Third in group	(8)	£5,000
Fourth in group	(8)	£2,500
Group winner bonus	(8)	£2,500

== Qualifying ==
=== Qualifying tournaments ===
For the first time, winners of the European Tour events were invited to the Grand Slam of Darts.

==== PDC ====
Tournament	Year	Position	Player	Qualifiers
Grand Slam of Darts	2013	Winner	(England) Phil Taylor	(England) Phil Taylor (Scotland) Robert Thornton (England) Adrian Lewis (England) Scott Waites (Netherlands) Raymond van Barneveld (Netherlands) Michael van Gerwen (England) Andy Hamilton (England) Dean Winstanley (Scotland) Peter Wright (Australia) Simon Whitlock (England) James Wade (England) Dave Chisnall (England) Terry Jenkins (Belgium) Kim Huybrechts (Belgium) Ronny Huybrechts (England) Mervyn King (England) Keegan Brown (Austria) Rowby-John Rodriguez
Grand Slam of Darts	2013	Runner-Up	(Scotland) Robert Thornton	(England) Phil Taylor (Scotland) Robert Thornton (England) Adrian Lewis (England) Scott Waites (Netherlands) Raymond van Barneveld (Netherlands) Michael van Gerwen (England) Andy Hamilton (England) Dean Winstanley (Scotland) Peter Wright (Australia) Simon Whitlock (England) James Wade (England) Dave Chisnall (England) Terry Jenkins (Belgium) Kim Huybrechts (Belgium) Ronny Huybrechts (England) Mervyn King (England) Keegan Brown (Austria) Rowby-John Rodriguez
Grand Slam of Darts	2013	Semi-finalists	(England) Adrian Lewis (England) Scott Waites	(England) Phil Taylor (Scotland) Robert Thornton (England) Adrian Lewis (England) Scott Waites (Netherlands) Raymond van Barneveld (Netherlands) Michael van Gerwen (England) Andy Hamilton (England) Dean Winstanley (Scotland) Peter Wright (Australia) Simon Whitlock (England) James Wade (England) Dave Chisnall (England) Terry Jenkins (Belgium) Kim Huybrechts (Belgium) Ronny Huybrechts (England) Mervyn King (England) Keegan Brown (Austria) Rowby-John Rodriguez
Grand Slam of Darts	2012	Winner	(Netherlands) Raymond van Barneveld	(England) Phil Taylor (Scotland) Robert Thornton (England) Adrian Lewis (England) Scott Waites (Netherlands) Raymond van Barneveld (Netherlands) Michael van Gerwen (England) Andy Hamilton (England) Dean Winstanley (Scotland) Peter Wright (Australia) Simon Whitlock (England) James Wade (England) Dave Chisnall (England) Terry Jenkins (Belgium) Kim Huybrechts (Belgium) Ronny Huybrechts (England) Mervyn King (England) Keegan Brown (Austria) Rowby-John Rodriguez
Grand Slam of Darts	2012	Runner-Up	(Netherlands) Michael van Gerwen	(England) Phil Taylor (Scotland) Robert Thornton (England) Adrian Lewis (England) Scott Waites (Netherlands) Raymond van Barneveld (Netherlands) Michael van Gerwen (England) Andy Hamilton (England) Dean Winstanley (Scotland) Peter Wright (Australia) Simon Whitlock (England) James Wade (England) Dave Chisnall (England) Terry Jenkins (Belgium) Kim Huybrechts (Belgium) Ronny Huybrechts (England) Mervyn King (England) Keegan Brown (Austria) Rowby-John Rodriguez
Grand Slam of Darts	2012	Semi-finalists	(England) Andy Hamilton (England) Dean Winstanley	(England) Phil Taylor (Scotland) Robert Thornton (England) Adrian Lewis (England) Scott Waites (Netherlands) Raymond van Barneveld (Netherlands) Michael van Gerwen (England) Andy Hamilton (England) Dean Winstanley (Scotland) Peter Wright (Australia) Simon Whitlock (England) James Wade (England) Dave Chisnall (England) Terry Jenkins (Belgium) Kim Huybrechts (Belgium) Ronny Huybrechts (England) Mervyn King (England) Keegan Brown (Austria) Rowby-John Rodriguez
PDC World Darts Championship	2014	Winner	(Netherlands) Michael van Gerwen	(England) Phil Taylor (Scotland) Robert Thornton (England) Adrian Lewis (England) Scott Waites (Netherlands) Raymond van Barneveld (Netherlands) Michael van Gerwen (England) Andy Hamilton (England) Dean Winstanley (Scotland) Peter Wright (Australia) Simon Whitlock (England) James Wade (England) Dave Chisnall (England) Terry Jenkins (Belgium) Kim Huybrechts (Belgium) Ronny Huybrechts (England) Mervyn King (England) Keegan Brown (Austria) Rowby-John Rodriguez
PDC World Darts Championship	2014	Runner-Up	(Scotland) Peter Wright	(England) Phil Taylor (Scotland) Robert Thornton (England) Adrian Lewis (England) Scott Waites (Netherlands) Raymond van Barneveld (Netherlands) Michael van Gerwen (England) Andy Hamilton (England) Dean Winstanley (Scotland) Peter Wright (Australia) Simon Whitlock (England) James Wade (England) Dave Chisnall (England) Terry Jenkins (Belgium) Kim Huybrechts (Belgium) Ronny Huybrechts (England) Mervyn King (England) Keegan Brown (Austria) Rowby-John Rodriguez
PDC World Darts Championship	2014	Semi-finalists	(Australia) Simon Whitlock (England) Adrian Lewis	(England) Phil Taylor (Scotland) Robert Thornton (England) Adrian Lewis (England) Scott Waites (Netherlands) Raymond van Barneveld (Netherlands) Michael van Gerwen (England) Andy Hamilton (England) Dean Winstanley (Scotland) Peter Wright (Australia) Simon Whitlock (England) James Wade (England) Dave Chisnall (England) Terry Jenkins (Belgium) Kim Huybrechts (Belgium) Ronny Huybrechts (England) Mervyn King (England) Keegan Brown (Austria) Rowby-John Rodriguez
PDC World Darts Championship	2013	Winner	(England) Phil Taylor	(England) Phil Taylor (Scotland) Robert Thornton (England) Adrian Lewis (England) Scott Waites (Netherlands) Raymond van Barneveld (Netherlands) Michael van Gerwen (England) Andy Hamilton (England) Dean Winstanley (Scotland) Peter Wright (Australia) Simon Whitlock (England) James Wade (England) Dave Chisnall (England) Terry Jenkins (Belgium) Kim Huybrechts (Belgium) Ronny Huybrechts (England) Mervyn King (England) Keegan Brown (Austria) Rowby-John Rodriguez
PDC World Darts Championship	2013	Runner-Up	(Netherlands) Michael van Gerwen	(England) Phil Taylor (Scotland) Robert Thornton (England) Adrian Lewis (England) Scott Waites (Netherlands) Raymond van Barneveld (Netherlands) Michael van Gerwen (England) Andy Hamilton (England) Dean Winstanley (Scotland) Peter Wright (Australia) Simon Whitlock (England) James Wade (England) Dave Chisnall (England) Terry Jenkins (Belgium) Kim Huybrechts (Belgium) Ronny Huybrechts (England) Mervyn King (England) Keegan Brown (Austria) Rowby-John Rodriguez
PDC World Darts Championship	2013	Semi-finalists	(Netherlands) Raymond van Barneveld (England) James Wade	(England) Phil Taylor (Scotland) Robert Thornton (England) Adrian Lewis (England) Scott Waites (Netherlands) Raymond van Barneveld (Netherlands) Michael van Gerwen (England) Andy Hamilton (England) Dean Winstanley (Scotland) Peter Wright (Australia) Simon Whitlock (England) James Wade (England) Dave Chisnall (England) Terry Jenkins (Belgium) Kim Huybrechts (Belgium) Ronny Huybrechts (England) Mervyn King (England) Keegan Brown (Austria) Rowby-John Rodriguez
PDC World Darts Championship	2012	Winner	(England) Adrian Lewis	(England) Phil Taylor (Scotland) Robert Thornton (England) Adrian Lewis (England) Scott Waites (Netherlands) Raymond van Barneveld (Netherlands) Michael van Gerwen (England) Andy Hamilton (England) Dean Winstanley (Scotland) Peter Wright (Australia) Simon Whitlock (England) James Wade (England) Dave Chisnall (England) Terry Jenkins (Belgium) Kim Huybrechts (Belgium) Ronny Huybrechts (England) Mervyn King (England) Keegan Brown (Austria) Rowby-John Rodriguez
PDC World Darts Championship	2011	Winner	(England) Adrian Lewis	(England) Phil Taylor (Scotland) Robert Thornton (England) Adrian Lewis (England) Scott Waites (Netherlands) Raymond van Barneveld (Netherlands) Michael van Gerwen (England) Andy Hamilton (England) Dean Winstanley (Scotland) Peter Wright (Australia) Simon Whitlock (England) James Wade (England) Dave Chisnall (England) Terry Jenkins (Belgium) Kim Huybrechts (Belgium) Ronny Huybrechts (England) Mervyn King (England) Keegan Brown (Austria) Rowby-John Rodriguez
PDC World Darts Championship	2010	Winner	(England) Phil Taylor	(England) Phil Taylor (Scotland) Robert Thornton (England) Adrian Lewis (England) Scott Waites (Netherlands) Raymond van Barneveld (Netherlands) Michael van Gerwen (England) Andy Hamilton (England) Dean Winstanley (Scotland) Peter Wright (Australia) Simon Whitlock (England) James Wade (England) Dave Chisnall (England) Terry Jenkins (Belgium) Kim Huybrechts (Belgium) Ronny Huybrechts (England) Mervyn King (England) Keegan Brown (Austria) Rowby-John Rodriguez
World Matchplay	2014	Winner	(England) Phil Taylor	(England) Phil Taylor (Scotland) Robert Thornton (England) Adrian Lewis (England) Scott Waites (Netherlands) Raymond van Barneveld (Netherlands) Michael van Gerwen (England) Andy Hamilton (England) Dean Winstanley (Scotland) Peter Wright (Australia) Simon Whitlock (England) James Wade (England) Dave Chisnall (England) Terry Jenkins (Belgium) Kim Huybrechts (Belgium) Ronny Huybrechts (England) Mervyn King (England) Keegan Brown (Austria) Rowby-John Rodriguez
World Matchplay	2014	Runner-Up	(Netherlands) Michael van Gerwen	(England) Phil Taylor (Scotland) Robert Thornton (England) Adrian Lewis (England) Scott Waites (Netherlands) Raymond van Barneveld (Netherlands) Michael van Gerwen (England) Andy Hamilton (England) Dean Winstanley (Scotland) Peter Wright (Australia) Simon Whitlock (England) James Wade (England) Dave Chisnall (England) Terry Jenkins (Belgium) Kim Huybrechts (Belgium) Ronny Huybrechts (England) Mervyn King (England) Keegan Brown (Austria) Rowby-John Rodriguez
World Matchplay	2013	Winner	(England) Phil Taylor	(England) Phil Taylor (Scotland) Robert Thornton (England) Adrian Lewis (England) Scott Waites (Netherlands) Raymond van Barneveld (Netherlands) Michael van Gerwen (England) Andy Hamilton (England) Dean Winstanley (Scotland) Peter Wright (Australia) Simon Whitlock (England) James Wade (England) Dave Chisnall (England) Terry Jenkins (Belgium) Kim Huybrechts (Belgium) Ronny Huybrechts (England) Mervyn King (England) Keegan Brown (Austria) Rowby-John Rodriguez
World Matchplay	2013	Runner-Up	(England) Adrian Lewis	(England) Phil Taylor (Scotland) Robert Thornton (England) Adrian Lewis (England) Scott Waites (Netherlands) Raymond van Barneveld (Netherlands) Michael van Gerwen (England) Andy Hamilton (England) Dean Winstanley (Scotland) Peter Wright (Australia) Simon Whitlock (England) James Wade (England) Dave Chisnall (England) Terry Jenkins (Belgium) Kim Huybrechts (Belgium) Ronny Huybrechts (England) Mervyn King (England) Keegan Brown (Austria) Rowby-John Rodriguez
World Grand Prix	2014	Winner	(Netherlands) Michael van Gerwen	(England) Phil Taylor (Scotland) Robert Thornton (England) Adrian Lewis (England) Scott Waites (Netherlands) Raymond van Barneveld (Netherlands) Michael van Gerwen (England) Andy Hamilton (England) Dean Winstanley (Scotland) Peter Wright (Australia) Simon Whitlock (England) James Wade (England) Dave Chisnall (England) Terry Jenkins (Belgium) Kim Huybrechts (Belgium) Ronny Huybrechts (England) Mervyn King (England) Keegan Brown (Austria) Rowby-John Rodriguez
World Grand Prix	2014	Runner-Up	(England) James Wade	(England) Phil Taylor (Scotland) Robert Thornton (England) Adrian Lewis (England) Scott Waites (Netherlands) Raymond van Barneveld (Netherlands) Michael van Gerwen (England) Andy Hamilton (England) Dean Winstanley (Scotland) Peter Wright (Australia) Simon Whitlock (England) James Wade (England) Dave Chisnall (England) Terry Jenkins (Belgium) Kim Huybrechts (Belgium) Ronny Huybrechts (England) Mervyn King (England) Keegan Brown (Austria) Rowby-John Rodriguez
World Grand Prix	2013	Winner	(England) Phil Taylor	(England) Phil Taylor (Scotland) Robert Thornton (England) Adrian Lewis (England) Scott Waites (Netherlands) Raymond van Barneveld (Netherlands) Michael van Gerwen (England) Andy Hamilton (England) Dean Winstanley (Scotland) Peter Wright (Australia) Simon Whitlock (England) James Wade (England) Dave Chisnall (England) Terry Jenkins (Belgium) Kim Huybrechts (Belgium) Ronny Huybrechts (England) Mervyn King (England) Keegan Brown (Austria) Rowby-John Rodriguez
World Grand Prix	2013	Runner-Up	(England) Dave Chisnall	(England) Phil Taylor (Scotland) Robert Thornton (England) Adrian Lewis (England) Scott Waites (Netherlands) Raymond van Barneveld (Netherlands) Michael van Gerwen (England) Andy Hamilton (England) Dean Winstanley (Scotland) Peter Wright (Australia) Simon Whitlock (England) James Wade (England) Dave Chisnall (England) Terry Jenkins (Belgium) Kim Huybrechts (Belgium) Ronny Huybrechts (England) Mervyn King (England) Keegan Brown (Austria) Rowby-John Rodriguez
UK Open	2014	Winner	(England) Adrian Lewis	(England) Phil Taylor (Scotland) Robert Thornton (England) Adrian Lewis (England) Scott Waites (Netherlands) Raymond van Barneveld (Netherlands) Michael van Gerwen (England) Andy Hamilton (England) Dean Winstanley (Scotland) Peter Wright (Australia) Simon Whitlock (England) James Wade (England) Dave Chisnall (England) Terry Jenkins (Belgium) Kim Huybrechts (Belgium) Ronny Huybrechts (England) Mervyn King (England) Keegan Brown (Austria) Rowby-John Rodriguez
UK Open	2014	Runner-Up	(England) Terry Jenkins	(England) Phil Taylor (Scotland) Robert Thornton (England) Adrian Lewis (England) Scott Waites (Netherlands) Raymond van Barneveld (Netherlands) Michael van Gerwen (England) Andy Hamilton (England) Dean Winstanley (Scotland) Peter Wright (Australia) Simon Whitlock (England) James Wade (England) Dave Chisnall (England) Terry Jenkins (Belgium) Kim Huybrechts (Belgium) Ronny Huybrechts (England) Mervyn King (England) Keegan Brown (Austria) Rowby-John Rodriguez
UK Open	2013	Winner	(England) Phil Taylor	(England) Phil Taylor (Scotland) Robert Thornton (England) Adrian Lewis (England) Scott Waites (Netherlands) Raymond van Barneveld (Netherlands) Michael van Gerwen (England) Andy Hamilton (England) Dean Winstanley (Scotland) Peter Wright (Australia) Simon Whitlock (England) James Wade (England) Dave Chisnall (England) Terry Jenkins (Belgium) Kim Huybrechts (Belgium) Ronny Huybrechts (England) Mervyn King (England) Keegan Brown (Austria) Rowby-John Rodriguez
UK Open	2013	Runner-Up	(England) Andy Hamilton	(England) Phil Taylor (Scotland) Robert Thornton (England) Adrian Lewis (England) Scott Waites (Netherlands) Raymond van Barneveld (Netherlands) Michael van Gerwen (England) Andy Hamilton (England) Dean Winstanley (Scotland) Peter Wright (Australia) Simon Whitlock (England) James Wade (England) Dave Chisnall (England) Terry Jenkins (Belgium) Kim Huybrechts (Belgium) Ronny Huybrechts (England) Mervyn King (England) Keegan Brown (Austria) Rowby-John Rodriguez
Premier League Darts	2014	Winner	(Netherlands) Raymond van Barneveld	(England) Phil Taylor (Scotland) Robert Thornton (England) Adrian Lewis (England) Scott Waites (Netherlands) Raymond van Barneveld (Netherlands) Michael van Gerwen (England) Andy Hamilton (England) Dean Winstanley (Scotland) Peter Wright (Australia) Simon Whitlock (England) James Wade (England) Dave Chisnall (England) Terry Jenkins (Belgium) Kim Huybrechts (Belgium) Ronny Huybrechts (England) Mervyn King (England) Keegan Brown (Austria) Rowby-John Rodriguez
Premier League Darts	2014	Runner-Up	(Netherlands) Michael van Gerwen	(England) Phil Taylor (Scotland) Robert Thornton (England) Adrian Lewis (England) Scott Waites (Netherlands) Raymond van Barneveld (Netherlands) Michael van Gerwen (England) Andy Hamilton (England) Dean Winstanley (Scotland) Peter Wright (Australia) Simon Whitlock (England) James Wade (England) Dave Chisnall (England) Terry Jenkins (Belgium) Kim Huybrechts (Belgium) Ronny Huybrechts (England) Mervyn King (England) Keegan Brown (Austria) Rowby-John Rodriguez
Premier League Darts	2013	Winner	(Netherlands) Michael van Gerwen	(England) Phil Taylor (Scotland) Robert Thornton (England) Adrian Lewis (England) Scott Waites (Netherlands) Raymond van Barneveld (Netherlands) Michael van Gerwen (England) Andy Hamilton (England) Dean Winstanley (Scotland) Peter Wright (Australia) Simon Whitlock (England) James Wade (England) Dave Chisnall (England) Terry Jenkins (Belgium) Kim Huybrechts (Belgium) Ronny Huybrechts (England) Mervyn King (England) Keegan Brown (Austria) Rowby-John Rodriguez
Premier League Darts	2013	Runner-Up	(England) Phil Taylor	(England) Phil Taylor (Scotland) Robert Thornton (England) Adrian Lewis (England) Scott Waites (Netherlands) Raymond van Barneveld (Netherlands) Michael van Gerwen (England) Andy Hamilton (England) Dean Winstanley (Scotland) Peter Wright (Australia) Simon Whitlock (England) James Wade (England) Dave Chisnall (England) Terry Jenkins (Belgium) Kim Huybrechts (Belgium) Ronny Huybrechts (England) Mervyn King (England) Keegan Brown (Austria) Rowby-John Rodriguez
Championship League Darts	2013	Winner	(England) Phil Taylor	(England) Phil Taylor (Scotland) Robert Thornton (England) Adrian Lewis (England) Scott Waites (Netherlands) Raymond van Barneveld (Netherlands) Michael van Gerwen (England) Andy Hamilton (England) Dean Winstanley (Scotland) Peter Wright (Australia) Simon Whitlock (England) James Wade (England) Dave Chisnall (England) Terry Jenkins (Belgium) Kim Huybrechts (Belgium) Ronny Huybrechts (England) Mervyn King (England) Keegan Brown (Austria) Rowby-John Rodriguez
Championship League Darts	2013	Runner-Up	(Netherlands) Michael van Gerwen	(England) Phil Taylor (Scotland) Robert Thornton (England) Adrian Lewis (England) Scott Waites (Netherlands) Raymond van Barneveld (Netherlands) Michael van Gerwen (England) Andy Hamilton (England) Dean Winstanley (Scotland) Peter Wright (Australia) Simon Whitlock (England) James Wade (England) Dave Chisnall (England) Terry Jenkins (Belgium) Kim Huybrechts (Belgium) Ronny Huybrechts (England) Mervyn King (England) Keegan Brown (Austria) Rowby-John Rodriguez
Players Championship Finals	2013	Winner	(Netherlands) Michael van Gerwen	(England) Phil Taylor (Scotland) Robert Thornton (England) Adrian Lewis (England) Scott Waites (Netherlands) Raymond van Barneveld (Netherlands) Michael van Gerwen (England) Andy Hamilton (England) Dean Winstanley (Scotland) Peter Wright (Australia) Simon Whitlock (England) James Wade (England) Dave Chisnall (England) Terry Jenkins (Belgium) Kim Huybrechts (Belgium) Ronny Huybrechts (England) Mervyn King (England) Keegan Brown (Austria) Rowby-John Rodriguez
Players Championship Finals	2013	Runner-Up	(England) Phil Taylor	(England) Phil Taylor (Scotland) Robert Thornton (England) Adrian Lewis (England) Scott Waites (Netherlands) Raymond van Barneveld (Netherlands) Michael van Gerwen (England) Andy Hamilton (England) Dean Winstanley (Scotland) Peter Wright (Australia) Simon Whitlock (England) James Wade (England) Dave Chisnall (England) Terry Jenkins (Belgium) Kim Huybrechts (Belgium) Ronny Huybrechts (England) Mervyn King (England) Keegan Brown (Austria) Rowby-John Rodriguez
Players Championship Finals	2012	Winner	(England) Phil Taylor	(England) Phil Taylor (Scotland) Robert Thornton (England) Adrian Lewis (England) Scott Waites (Netherlands) Raymond van Barneveld (Netherlands) Michael van Gerwen (England) Andy Hamilton (England) Dean Winstanley (Scotland) Peter Wright (Australia) Simon Whitlock (England) James Wade (England) Dave Chisnall (England) Terry Jenkins (Belgium) Kim Huybrechts (Belgium) Ronny Huybrechts (England) Mervyn King (England) Keegan Brown (Austria) Rowby-John Rodriguez
Players Championship Finals	2012	Runner-Up	(Belgium) Kim Huybrechts	(England) Phil Taylor (Scotland) Robert Thornton (England) Adrian Lewis (England) Scott Waites (Netherlands) Raymond van Barneveld (Netherlands) Michael van Gerwen (England) Andy Hamilton (England) Dean Winstanley (Scotland) Peter Wright (Australia) Simon Whitlock (England) James Wade (England) Dave Chisnall (England) Terry Jenkins (Belgium) Kim Huybrechts (Belgium) Ronny Huybrechts (England) Mervyn King (England) Keegan Brown (Austria) Rowby-John Rodriguez
European Championship	2014	Winner	(Netherlands) Michael van Gerwen	(England) Phil Taylor (Scotland) Robert Thornton (England) Adrian Lewis (England) Scott Waites (Netherlands) Raymond van Barneveld (Netherlands) Michael van Gerwen (England) Andy Hamilton (England) Dean Winstanley (Scotland) Peter Wright (Australia) Simon Whitlock (England) James Wade (England) Dave Chisnall (England) Terry Jenkins (Belgium) Kim Huybrechts (Belgium) Ronny Huybrechts (England) Mervyn King (England) Keegan Brown (Austria) Rowby-John Rodriguez
European Championship	2014	Runner-Up	(England) Terry Jenkins	(England) Phil Taylor (Scotland) Robert Thornton (England) Adrian Lewis (England) Scott Waites (Netherlands) Raymond van Barneveld (Netherlands) Michael van Gerwen (England) Andy Hamilton (England) Dean Winstanley (Scotland) Peter Wright (Australia) Simon Whitlock (England) James Wade (England) Dave Chisnall (England) Terry Jenkins (Belgium) Kim Huybrechts (Belgium) Ronny Huybrechts (England) Mervyn King (England) Keegan Brown (Austria) Rowby-John Rodriguez
European Championship	2013	Winner	(England) Adrian Lewis	(England) Phil Taylor (Scotland) Robert Thornton (England) Adrian Lewis (England) Scott Waites (Netherlands) Raymond van Barneveld (Netherlands) Michael van Gerwen (England) Andy Hamilton (England) Dean Winstanley (Scotland) Peter Wright (Australia) Simon Whitlock (England) James Wade (England) Dave Chisnall (England) Terry Jenkins (Belgium) Kim Huybrechts (Belgium) Ronny Huybrechts (England) Mervyn King (England) Keegan Brown (Austria) Rowby-John Rodriguez
European Championship	2013	Runner-Up	(Australia) Simon Whitlock	(England) Phil Taylor (Scotland) Robert Thornton (England) Adrian Lewis (England) Scott Waites (Netherlands) Raymond van Barneveld (Netherlands) Michael van Gerwen (England) Andy Hamilton (England) Dean Winstanley (Scotland) Peter Wright (Australia) Simon Whitlock (England) James Wade (England) Dave Chisnall (England) Terry Jenkins (Belgium) Kim Huybrechts (Belgium) Ronny Huybrechts (England) Mervyn King (England) Keegan Brown (Austria) Rowby-John Rodriguez
PDC World Cup of Darts	2014	Winners	(Netherlands) Michael van Gerwen (Netherlands) Raymond van Barneveld	(England) Phil Taylor (Scotland) Robert Thornton (England) Adrian Lewis (England) Scott Waites (Netherlands) Raymond van Barneveld (Netherlands) Michael van Gerwen (England) Andy Hamilton (England) Dean Winstanley (Scotland) Peter Wright (Australia) Simon Whitlock (England) James Wade (England) Dave Chisnall (England) Terry Jenkins (Belgium) Kim Huybrechts (Belgium) Ronny Huybrechts (England) Mervyn King (England) Keegan Brown (Austria) Rowby-John Rodriguez
PDC World Cup of Darts	2014	Runners-Up	(England) Phil Taylor (England) Adrian Lewis	(England) Phil Taylor (Scotland) Robert Thornton (England) Adrian Lewis (England) Scott Waites (Netherlands) Raymond van Barneveld (Netherlands) Michael van Gerwen (England) Andy Hamilton (England) Dean Winstanley (Scotland) Peter Wright (Australia) Simon Whitlock (England) James Wade (England) Dave Chisnall (England) Terry Jenkins (Belgium) Kim Huybrechts (Belgium) Ronny Huybrechts (England) Mervyn King (England) Keegan Brown (Austria) Rowby-John Rodriguez
PDC World Cup of Darts	2013	Winners	(England) Phil Taylor (England) Adrian Lewis	(England) Phil Taylor (Scotland) Robert Thornton (England) Adrian Lewis (England) Scott Waites (Netherlands) Raymond van Barneveld (Netherlands) Michael van Gerwen (England) Andy Hamilton (England) Dean Winstanley (Scotland) Peter Wright (Australia) Simon Whitlock (England) James Wade (England) Dave Chisnall (England) Terry Jenkins (Belgium) Kim Huybrechts (Belgium) Ronny Huybrechts (England) Mervyn King (England) Keegan Brown (Austria) Rowby-John Rodriguez
PDC World Cup of Darts	2013	Runners-Up	(Belgium) Kim Huybrechts (Belgium) Ronny Huybrechts	(England) Phil Taylor (Scotland) Robert Thornton (England) Adrian Lewis (England) Scott Waites (Netherlands) Raymond van Barneveld (Netherlands) Michael van Gerwen (England) Andy Hamilton (England) Dean Winstanley (Scotland) Peter Wright (Australia) Simon Whitlock (England) James Wade (England) Dave Chisnall (England) Terry Jenkins (Belgium) Kim Huybrechts (Belgium) Ronny Huybrechts (England) Mervyn King (England) Keegan Brown (Austria) Rowby-John Rodriguez
Masters	2014	Winner	(England) James Wade	(England) Phil Taylor (Scotland) Robert Thornton (England) Adrian Lewis (England) Scott Waites (Netherlands) Raymond van Barneveld (Netherlands) Michael van Gerwen (England) Andy Hamilton (England) Dean Winstanley (Scotland) Peter Wright (Australia) Simon Whitlock (England) James Wade (England) Dave Chisnall (England) Terry Jenkins (Belgium) Kim Huybrechts (Belgium) Ronny Huybrechts (England) Mervyn King (England) Keegan Brown (Austria) Rowby-John Rodriguez
Masters	2014	Runner-Up	(England) Mervyn King	(England) Phil Taylor (Scotland) Robert Thornton (England) Adrian Lewis (England) Scott Waites (Netherlands) Raymond van Barneveld (Netherlands) Michael van Gerwen (England) Andy Hamilton (England) Dean Winstanley (Scotland) Peter Wright (Australia) Simon Whitlock (England) James Wade (England) Dave Chisnall (England) Terry Jenkins (Belgium) Kim Huybrechts (Belgium) Ronny Huybrechts (England) Mervyn King (England) Keegan Brown (Austria) Rowby-John Rodriguez
Masters	2013	Winner	(England) Phil Taylor	(England) Phil Taylor (Scotland) Robert Thornton (England) Adrian Lewis (England) Scott Waites (Netherlands) Raymond van Barneveld (Netherlands) Michael van Gerwen (England) Andy Hamilton (England) Dean Winstanley (Scotland) Peter Wright (Australia) Simon Whitlock (England) James Wade (England) Dave Chisnall (England) Terry Jenkins (Belgium) Kim Huybrechts (Belgium) Ronny Huybrechts (England) Mervyn King (England) Keegan Brown (Austria) Rowby-John Rodriguez
Masters	2013	Runner-Up	(England) Adrian Lewis	(England) Phil Taylor (Scotland) Robert Thornton (England) Adrian Lewis (England) Scott Waites (Netherlands) Raymond van Barneveld (Netherlands) Michael van Gerwen (England) Andy Hamilton (England) Dean Winstanley (Scotland) Peter Wright (Australia) Simon Whitlock (England) James Wade (England) Dave Chisnall (England) Terry Jenkins (Belgium) Kim Huybrechts (Belgium) Ronny Huybrechts (England) Mervyn King (England) Keegan Brown (Austria) Rowby-John Rodriguez
PDC World Youth Championship	2014	Winner	(England) Keegan Brown	(England) Phil Taylor (Scotland) Robert Thornton (England) Adrian Lewis (England) Scott Waites (Netherlands) Raymond van Barneveld (Netherlands) Michael van Gerwen (England) Andy Hamilton (England) Dean Winstanley (Scotland) Peter Wright (Australia) Simon Whitlock (England) James Wade (England) Dave Chisnall (England) Terry Jenkins (Belgium) Kim Huybrechts (Belgium) Ronny Huybrechts (England) Mervyn King (England) Keegan Brown (Austria) Rowby-John Rodriguez
PDC World Youth Championship	2014	Runner-Up	(Austria) Rowby-John Rodriguez	(England) Phil Taylor (Scotland) Robert Thornton (England) Adrian Lewis (England) Scott Waites (Netherlands) Raymond van Barneveld (Netherlands) Michael van Gerwen (England) Andy Hamilton (England) Dean Winstanley (Scotland) Peter Wright (Australia) Simon Whitlock (England) James Wade (England) Dave Chisnall (England) Terry Jenkins (Belgium) Kim Huybrechts (Belgium) Ronny Huybrechts (England) Mervyn King (England) Keegan Brown (Austria) Rowby-John Rodriguez
Note: Players in italics had already qualified for the tournament.				(England) Phil Taylor (Scotland) Robert Thornton (England) Adrian Lewis (England) Scott Waites (Netherlands) Raymond van Barneveld (Netherlands) Michael van Gerwen (England) Andy Hamilton (England) Dean Winstanley (Scotland) Peter Wright (Australia) Simon Whitlock (England) James Wade (England) Dave Chisnall (England) Terry Jenkins (Belgium) Kim Huybrechts (Belgium) Ronny Huybrechts (England) Mervyn King (England) Keegan Brown (Austria) Rowby-John Rodriguez

PDC European Tour
Tournament	Event	Position	Player	Qualifiers
2014 European Tour	2014 German Darts Championship	Winner	(Scotland) Gary Anderson	(Scotland) Gary Anderson (Netherlands) Vincent van der Voort (England) Michael Smith
2014 European Tour	2014 Dutch Darts Masters	Winner	(Netherlands) Michael van Gerwen	(Scotland) Gary Anderson (Netherlands) Vincent van der Voort (England) Michael Smith
2014 European Tour	2014 German Darts Masters	Winner	(England) Phil Taylor	(Scotland) Gary Anderson (Netherlands) Vincent van der Voort (England) Michael Smith
2014 European Tour	2014 Austrian Darts Open	Winner	(Netherlands) Vincent van der Voort	(Scotland) Gary Anderson (Netherlands) Vincent van der Voort (England) Michael Smith
2014 European Tour	2014 Gibraltar Darts Trophy	Winner	(England) James Wade	(Scotland) Gary Anderson (Netherlands) Vincent van der Voort (England) Michael Smith
2014 European Tour	2014 European Darts Open	Winner	(Scotland) Peter Wright	(Scotland) Gary Anderson (Netherlands) Vincent van der Voort (England) Michael Smith
2014 European Tour	2014 European Darts Grand Prix	Winner	(England) Mervyn King	(Scotland) Gary Anderson (Netherlands) Vincent van der Voort (England) Michael Smith
2014 European Tour	2014 European Darts Trophy	Winner	(England) Michael Smith	(Scotland) Gary Anderson (Netherlands) Vincent van der Voort (England) Michael Smith
Note: Players in italics had already qualified for the tournament.				(Scotland) Gary Anderson (Netherlands) Vincent van der Voort (England) Michael Smith

==== BDO ====
Tournament	Year	Position	Player	Qualifiers
BDO World Darts Championship	2014	Winner	(England) Stephen Bunting	(England) Stephen Bunting (England) Alan Norris (England) Robbie Green (Netherlands) Jan Dekker (England) Tony O'Shea (Netherlands) Wesley Harms (England) Richie George (Netherlands) Christian Kist
BDO World Darts Championship	2014	Runner-Up	(England) Alan Norris	(England) Stephen Bunting (England) Alan Norris (England) Robbie Green (Netherlands) Jan Dekker (England) Tony O'Shea (Netherlands) Wesley Harms (England) Richie George (Netherlands) Christian Kist
BDO World Darts Championship	2014	Semi-finalists	(England) Robbie Green (Netherlands) Jan Dekker	(England) Stephen Bunting (England) Alan Norris (England) Robbie Green (Netherlands) Jan Dekker (England) Tony O'Shea (Netherlands) Wesley Harms (England) Richie George (Netherlands) Christian Kist
BDO World Darts Championship	2013	Winner	(England) Scott Waites	(England) Stephen Bunting (England) Alan Norris (England) Robbie Green (Netherlands) Jan Dekker (England) Tony O'Shea (Netherlands) Wesley Harms (England) Richie George (Netherlands) Christian Kist
BDO World Darts Championship	2013	Runner-Up	(England) Tony O'Shea	(England) Stephen Bunting (England) Alan Norris (England) Robbie Green (Netherlands) Jan Dekker (England) Tony O'Shea (Netherlands) Wesley Harms (England) Richie George (Netherlands) Christian Kist
BDO World Darts Championship	2013	Semi-finalists	(Netherlands) Wesley Harms (England) Richie George	(England) Stephen Bunting (England) Alan Norris (England) Robbie Green (Netherlands) Jan Dekker (England) Tony O'Shea (Netherlands) Wesley Harms (England) Richie George (Netherlands) Christian Kist
BDO World Darts Championship	2012	Winner	(Netherlands) Christian Kist	(England) Stephen Bunting (England) Alan Norris (England) Robbie Green (Netherlands) Jan Dekker (England) Tony O'Shea (Netherlands) Wesley Harms (England) Richie George (Netherlands) Christian Kist
BDO World Darts Championship	2011	Winner	(England) ~~Martin Adams~~	(England) Stephen Bunting (England) Alan Norris (England) Robbie Green (Netherlands) Jan Dekker (England) Tony O'Shea (Netherlands) Wesley Harms (England) Richie George (Netherlands) Christian Kist
BDO World Darts Championship	2010	Winner	(England) ~~Martin Adams~~	(England) Stephen Bunting (England) Alan Norris (England) Robbie Green (Netherlands) Jan Dekker (England) Tony O'Shea (Netherlands) Wesley Harms (England) Richie George (Netherlands) Christian Kist
Note: Players in italics had already qualified for the tournament.				(England) Stephen Bunting (England) Alan Norris (England) Robbie Green (Netherlands) Jan Dekker (England) Tony O'Shea (Netherlands) Wesley Harms (England) Richie George (Netherlands) Christian Kist

==== Other qualifiers ====
Criteria	Player
Grand Slam of Darts Wildcards	(Northern Ireland) Brendan Dolan (England) Jamie Caven (England) Darren Webster

== Pools ==
Pool A	Pool B	Pool C	Pool D
(Seeded Players)	(qualifiers)		
(Netherlands) Michael van Gerwen (1) (England) Phil Taylor (2) (England) Stephen Bunting (3) (Netherlands) Raymond van Barneveld (4) (England) Adrian Lewis (5) (England) James Wade (6) (Scotland) Peter Wright (7) (England) Alan Norris (8)	(Scotland) Gary Anderson (England) Dave Chisnall (England) Andy Hamilton (Belgium) Kim Huybrechts (England) Mervyn King (Scotland) Robert Thornton (England) Scott Waites (Australia) Simon Whitlock	(England) Keegan Brown (Netherlands) Jan Dekker (England) Terry Jenkins (Netherlands) Christian Kist (England) Tony O'Shea (England) Michael Smith (Netherlands) Vincent van der Voort (England) Dean Winstanley	(Northern Ireland) Brendan Dolan (England) Jamie Caven (England) Richie George (England) Robbie Green (Netherlands) Wesley Harms (Belgium) Ronny Huybrechts (Austria) Rowby-John Rodriguez (England) Darren Webster

== Draw ==
=== Group stage ===
All matches first-to-5/best of 9 legs
NB in Brackets: Number = Seeds; BDO = BDO Darts player; Q = Qualifier
NB: P = Played; W = Won; L = Lost; LF = Legs for; LA = Legs against; +/− = Plus/minus record, in relation to legs; Average – 3-dart average; Pts = Points; Q = Qualified for K.O. phase

==== Group A ====
Pos.	Player	P	W	L	LF	LA	+/−	Pts	Status
1	(Netherlands) Michael van Gerwen (1)	3	3	0	15	6	+9	6	Q
2	(Belgium) Kim Huybrechts	3	2	1	12	8	+4	4	Q
3	(Netherlands) Jan Dekker (BDO)	3	1	2	7	12	−5	2	Eliminated
4	(England) Darren Webster (Q)	3	0	3	7	15	−8	0	Eliminated

8 November

91.54 Kim Huybrechts (Belgium)	5 – 2	(Netherlands) Jan Dekker 85.47
90.33 Michael van Gerwen (Netherlands)	5 – 4	(England) Darren Webster 94.64

9 November

89.70 Jan Dekker (Netherlands)	5 – 2	(England) Darren Webster 88.32
101.23 Michael van Gerwen (Netherlands)	5 – 2	(Belgium) Kim Huybrechts 96.50

10 November

90.69 Kim Huybrechts (Belgium)	5 – 1	(England) Darren Webster 83.70
95.13 Michael van Gerwen (Netherlands)	5 – 0	(Netherlands) Jan Dekker 76.68

==== Group B ====
Pos.	Player	P	W	L	LF	LA	+/−	Pts	Status
1	(England) Alan Norris (BDO,8)	3	2	1	13	8	+5	4	Q
2	(England) Terry Jenkins	3	2	1	11	8	+3	4	Q
3	(England) Scott Waites (BDO)	3	1	2	11	13	−2	2	Eliminated
4	(Belgium) Ronny Huybrechts	3	1	2	8	14	−6	2	Eliminated

8 November

85.78 Scott Waites (England)	2 – 5	(England) Terry Jenkins 94.83
85.63 Alan Norris (England)	5 – 2	(Belgium) Ronny Huybrechts 89.35

9 November

94.25 Scott Waites (England)	4 – 5	(Belgium) Ronny Huybrechts 86.83
99.13 Alan Norris (England)	5 – 1	(England) Terry Jenkins 88.88

10 November

89.07 Terry Jenkins (England)	5 – 1	(Belgium) Ronny Huybrechts 89.73
92.83 Alan Norris (England)	3 – 5	(England) Scott Waites 89.48

==== Group C ====
Pos.	Player	P	W	L	LF	LA	+/−	Pts	Status
1	(England) Dave Chisnall	3	2	1	12	7	+5	4	Q
2	(England) Keegan Brown	3	2	1	11	9	+2	4	Q
3	(Austria) Rowby-John Rodriguez	3	1	2	9	12	−3	2	Eliminated
4	(England) Adrian Lewis (5)	3	1	2	8	12	−4	2	Eliminated

8 November

100.84 Dave Chisnall (England)	5 – 1	(England) Keegan Brown 93.04
91.37 Adrian Lewis (England)	2 – 5	(Austria) Rowby-John Rodriguez 90.22

9 November

100.46 Dave Chisnall (England)	5 – 1	(Austria) Rowby-John Rodriguez 97.46
95.85 Adrian Lewis (England)	1 – 5	(England) Keegan Brown 100.66

10 November

86.86 Adrian Lewis (England)	5 – 2	(England) Dave Chisnall 93.64
95.22 Keegan Brown (England)	5 – 3	(Austria) Rowby-John Rodriguez 91.75

==== Group D ====
Pos.	Player	P	W	L	LF	LA	+/−	Pts	Status
1	(Netherlands) Raymond van Barneveld (4)	3	3	0	15	9	+6	6	Q
2	(England) Robbie Green (BDO)	3	2	1	13	11	+2	4	Q
3	(Netherlands) Vincent van der Voort	3	1	2	13	12	+1	2	Eliminated
4	(Scotland) Robert Thornton	3	0	3	6	15	−9	0	Eliminated

8 November

97.19 Robert Thornton (Scotland)	2 – 5	(Netherlands) Vincent van der Voort 99.26
91.53 Raymond van Barneveld (Netherlands)	5 – 3	(England) Robbie Green 85.31

9 November

92.35 Robert Thornton (Scotland)	2 – 5	(England) Robbie Green 99.61
90.38 Raymond van Barneveld (Netherlands)	5 – 4	(Netherlands) Vincent van der Voort 86.40

10 November

90.69 Vincent van der Voort (Netherlands)	4 – 5	(England) Robbie Green 96.72
92.97 Raymond van Barneveld (Netherlands)	5 – 2	(Scotland) Robert Thornton 90.12

==== Group E ====
Pos.	Player	P	W	L	LF	LA	+/−	Pts	Status
1	(England) Phil Taylor (2)	3	3	0	15	4	+11	6	Q
2	(Netherlands) Christian Kist	3	2	1	11	8	+3	4	Q
3	(England) Andy Hamilton	3	1	2	10	12	−2	2	Eliminated
4	(England) Richie George (BDO)	3	0	3	3	15	−12	0	Eliminated

8 November

95.69 Andy Hamilton (England)	2 – 5	(Netherlands) Christian Kist 95.52
100.20 Phil Taylor (England)	5 – 0	(England) Richie George 80.09

9 November

114.65 Phil Taylor (England)	5 – 1	(Netherlands) Christian Kist 99.46
94.79 Andy Hamilton (England)	5 – 2	(England) Richie George 84.30

11 November

106.47 Phil Taylor (England)	5 – 3	(England) Andy Hamilton 98.81
95.49 Christian Kist (Netherlands)	5 – 1	(England) Richie George 80.03

==== Group F ====
Pos.	Player	P	W	L	LF	LA	+/−	Pts	Status
1	(England) Michael Smith	3	3	0	15	7	+8	6	Q
2	(Scotland) Peter Wright (7)	3	2	1	14	10	+4	4	Q
3	(Australia) Simon Whitlock	3	1	2	10	13	−3	2	Eliminated
4	(Northern Ireland) Brendan Dolan (Q)	3	0	3	6	15	−9	0	Eliminated

8 November

91.96 Peter Wright (Scotland)	5 – 2	(Northern Ireland) Brendan Dolan 92.28
92.84 Simon Whitlock (Australia)	2 – 5	(England) Michael Smith 104.91

9 November

90.65 Peter Wright (Scotland)	4 – 5	(England) Michael Smith 86.32
97.45 Simon Whitlock (Australia)	5 – 3	(Northern Ireland) Brendan Dolan 87.54

11 November

100.16 Peter Wright (Scotland)	5 – 3	(Australia) Simon Whitlock 100.84
102.71 Michael Smith (England)	5 – 1	(Northern Ireland) Brendan Dolan 90.72

==== Group G ====
Pos.	Player	P	W	L	LF	LA	+/−	Pts	Status
1	(England) Mervyn King	3	3	0	15	12	+3	6	Q
2	(England) James Wade (6)	3	2	1	14	7	+7	4	Q
3	(England) Tony O'Shea (BDO)	3	1	2	10	13	−3	2	Eliminated
4	(England) Jamie Caven (Q)	3	0	3	8	15	−7	0	Eliminated

8 November

80.37 Mervyn King (England)	5 – 4	(England) Tony O'Shea 89.45
99.48 James Wade (England)	5 – 1	(England) Jamie Caven 98.43

9 November

85.32 Tony O'Shea (England)	5 – 3	(England) Jamie Caven 93.96
84.96 James Wade (England)	4 – 5	(England) Mervyn King 83.76

11 November

98.55 Mervyn King (England)	5 – 4	(England) Jamie Caven 90.99
99.95 James Wade (England)	5 – 1	(England) Tony O'Shea 90.35

==== Group H ====
Pos.	Player	P	W	L	LF	LA	+/−	Pts	Status
1	(England) Stephen Bunting (3)	3	3	0	15	5	+10	6	Q
2	(Scotland) Gary Anderson	3	2	1	12	6	+6	4	Q
3	(Netherlands) Wesley Harms (BDO)	3	1	2	6	13	−7	2	Eliminated
4	(England) Dean Winstanley	3	0	3	6	15	−9	0	Eliminated

8 November

103.84 Stephen Bunting (England)	5 – 1	(Netherlands) Wesley Harms 91.54
96.32 Gary Anderson (Scotland)	5 – 1	(England) Dean Winstanley 78.40

9 November

102.73 Stephen Bunting (England)	5 – 2	(Scotland) Gary Anderson 96.76
81.77 Dean Winstanley (England)	3 – 5	(Netherlands) Wesley Harms 87.16

11 November

89.70 Stephen Bunting (England)	5 – 2	(England) Dean Winstanley 86.20
102.95 Gary Anderson (Scotland)	5 – 0	(Netherlands) Wesley Harms 90.43

=== Knockout stage ===
Second round (best of 19 legs); 12–13 November
A1	(Netherlands) Michael van Gerwen (1) 88.64	10
B2	(England) Terry Jenkins 85.66	4
B1	(England) Alan Norris (BDO,8) 90.39	5
A2	(Belgium) Kim Huybrechts 97.92	10
C1	(England) Dave Chisnall 91.55	10
D2	(England) Robbie Green (BDO) 84.13	3
D1	(Netherlands) Raymond van Barneveld (4) 91.46	7
C2	(England) Keegan Brown 97.95	10
E1	(England) Phil Taylor (2) 101.70	10
F2	(Scotland) Peter Wright (7) 99.05	4
F1	(England) Michael Smith 99.97	10
E2	(Netherlands) Christian Kist 89.12	5
G1	(England) Mervyn King 94.12	10
H2	(Scotland) Gary Anderson 96.32	4
H1	(England) Stephen Bunting (BDO,3) 98.24	10
G2	(England) James Wade (6) 95.45	8

Quarter-finals (best of 31 legs); 14–15 November
A1	(Netherlands) Michael van Gerwen (1) 103.87	10
A2	(Belgium) Kim Huybrechts 104.83	16
C1	(England) Dave Chisnall 96.64	16
C2	(England) Keegan Brown 97.68	14
E1	(England) Phil Taylor (2) 107.28	16
F1	(England) Michael Smith 86.45	3
G1	(England) Mervyn King 96.01	16
H1	(England) Stephen Bunting (BDO,3) 96.54	9

Semi-finals (best of 31 legs); 16 November
A2	(Belgium) Kim Huybrechts 97.36	15
C1	(England) Dave Chisnall 96.64	16
E1	(England) Phil Taylor (2) 101.61	16
G1	(England) Mervyn King 94.84	9

Final (best of 31 legs); 16 November
C1	(England) Dave Chisnall 98.02	13
E1	(England) Phil Taylor (2) 102.45	16

== Statistics ==
Player	Eliminated	Played	Legs Won	Legs Lost	100+	140+	180s	High checkout	3-dart average
(England) Phil Taylor	Winner	7	73	33	160	70	28	140	103.82
(England) Dave Chisnall	Runner-up	7	67	55	151	81	39	170	96.57
(England) Mervyn King	Semi-finals	6	50	41	129	54	24	164	92.68
(Belgium) Kim Huybrechts	Semi-finals	6	53	39	105	70	33	155	98.38
(England) Stephen Bunting	Quarter-finals	5	34	29	77	52	12	145	97.55
(England) Keegan Brown	Quarter-finals	5	35	32	95	53	17	130	97.30
(Netherlands) Michael van Gerwen	Quarter-finals	5	35	26	70	40	17	141	96.74
(England) Michael Smith	Quarter-finals	5	28	28	55	35	18	127	94.04
(Scotland) Gary Anderson	Second round	4	16	16	43	26	10	106	97.44
(Scotland) Peter Wright	Second round	4	18	20	56	26	10	135	95.78
(England) James Wade	Second round	4	22	17	70	24	5	170	94.02
(Netherlands) Christian Kist	Second round	4	16	18	39	25	6	85	93.30
(Netherlands) Raymond van Barneveld	Second round	4	22	19	54	31	7	136	91.50
(England) Alan Norris	Second round	4	18	22	35	31	6	164	91.35
(England) Robbie Green	Second round	4	16	21	40	28	9	170	90.24
(England) Terry Jenkins	Second round	4	15	18	52	17	5	116	88.76
(Australia) Simon Whitlock	Group stage	3	10	13	34	14	7	86	97.24
(England) Andy Hamilton	Group stage	3	10	12	24	19	4	96	96.45
(England) Jamie Caven	Group stage	3	8	15	25	29	3	129	93.93
(Scotland) Robert Thornton	Group stage	3	6	15	31	12	5	161	93.12
(Austria) Rowby-John Rodriguez	Group stage	3	9	12	24	8	7	127	92.76
(Netherlands) Vincent van der Voort	Group stage	3	13	12	29	15	8	158	91.20
(England) Adrian Lewis	Group stage	3	8	12	20	12	4	80	90.97
(England) Scott Waites	Group stage	3	11	13	33	9	5	126	90.21
(Northern Ireland) Brendan Dolan	Group stage	3	6	15	31	12	2	106	90.04
(England) Darren Webster	Group stage	3	7	15	30	20	3	64	89.62
(Netherlands) Wesley Harms	Group stage	3	6	13	25	14	2	156	89.27
(Belgium) Ronny Huybrechts	Group stage	3	8	14	28	15	3	81	88.43
(England) Tony O'Shea	Group stage	3	10	13	32	11	8	104	88.19
(Netherlands) Jan Dekker	Group stage	3	7	12	21	8	3	124	84.83
(England) Dean Winstanley	Group stage	3	6	15	29	11	2	116	82.29
(England) Richie George	Group stage	3	3	15	20	8	3	72	81.76
