= Suni (disambiguation) =

Suni (Neotragus moschatus) is a small species of antelope.

Suni can also refer to:

== Places ==
- Suni (geography), a vegetation zone of the Andes
- Suni, Sardinia, a municipality in Italy

== People ==
- Sunisa "Suni" Lee (born 2003), American gymnast
- Súni Olsen (born 1981), a Faroese association football player
- Suni Paz, an Argentinian musician
- Grikor Suni (1876–1939), an Armenian composer
- Leo Suni (1891–1942), a Finnish Olympic diver
- Simple Suni (born 1986), an Indian film director, producer and songwriter
- Sunita Williams (born 1965), a former American astronaut and a U.S. Navy officer
- Suni Hạ Linh (born 1990), a Vietnamese singer

== Fictional characters ==
- Suni Bulsara, from the British soap opera Doctors
- Suni Sharma, from the British soap opera Emmerdale

== See also ==
- Seoni, Himachal Pradesh, a town in India
- Sunna (disambiguation)
- Sunnah, a set of traditional customs and practices associated with the Islamic prophet Muhammad and other early Muslim figures
- Sunni Islam, a major branch of Islam
