= Kim Smith =

Kim or Kimberley Smith may refer to:

== Sports ==
- Kim Smith (runner) (born 1981), New Zealand distance runner
- Kim Smith (basketball) (Kim Smith Gaucher, born 1984), Canadian female professional basketball player
- Kimberly Smith (cyclist) (born 1968), American cyclist
- Kim Smith (footballer) (1952–2009), Australian rules player
- Kimberley Smith (netball) (born 1982), Australian netball player
- Kimberly Smith (rugby union) (born 1985), New Zealand rugby union player

== Others ==
- Kim David Smith (born 1982/83), Australian cabaret performer in New York City
- Kimberly G. Smith (1948–2018), American biologist
- Kim Gruenenfelder, later Smith, American author
- Kimberly K. Smith (born 1966), American historian and political science professor
- Kimberly Y. Smith, American scientific executive and medical doctor
- Kim Smith (model) (born 1983), American actress and fashion model
- Kim Walker-Smith (born 1981), American singer and songwriter
- Birth name of Kim Wilde (born 1960) British singer
- Kim Smith (Reality TV), contestant on The Amazing Race
- Kim Smith (EastEnders), fictional character on TV soap opera EastEnders
- Kim Thomas Smith, American politician
