= Kim dynasty =

Kim dynasty may refer to:

- The later rulers of Silla, who were mostly members of the Gyeongju Kim clan
- Rulers of Geumgwan Gaya
- Kim dynasty (North Korea), the rulers of North Korea since Kim Il-sung in 1948

== See also ==
- Kim (surname)
- Jin dynasty (disambiguation)
