= 2015 Premier League Darts =

Darts competition

2015 Betway Premier League Darts

Tournament information
- Dates: 4 February–21 May 2015

Champion(s)
- Gary Anderson (SCO)

The 2015 Betway Premier League Darts was a darts tournament organised by the Professional Darts Corporation; the eleventh edition of the tournament. The event began at the Leeds Arena in Leeds on 4 February, and ended at The O_{2} Arena, London on 21 May. The tournament was shown live on Sky Sports in the UK and Ireland. This was the second year that the tournament was sponsored by Betway.

Raymond van Barneveld was the defending champion, but he lost to Michael van Gerwen 10–8 in the semi-finals. Gary Anderson won his second Premier League Darts title by beating van Gerwen 11–7 in the final.

For the first time in the Premier League's history, 6-time winner Phil Taylor did not qualify for the play-offs.

== Format ==
The tournament format was identical to that since 2013. During the first nine weeks (phase 1) each player plays the other nine players once. The bottom two players are eliminated from the competition. In the next six weeks (phase 2), each player plays the other seven players once. Phase 2 consists of four weeks where five matches are played followed by two weeks where four matches are played. At the end of phase 2 the top four players contest the two semi-finals and the final in the play-off week.

== Players ==
The competitors who competed at the tournament were announced following the 2015 PDC World Darts Championship final on 4 January 2015, with the top four of the PDC Order of Merit joined by six Wildcards.

Robert Thornton (world number 8), Wes Newton (number 16), and Simon Whitlock (number 7) did not return from last year. James Wade returned this year following his absence from the 2014 Premier League, along with two debutants, Kim Huybrechts, the first Belgian to compete in the league, and Stephen Bunting, the 2014 BDO world champion who had a successful first year with the PDC.

| Player | Appearance in Premier League | Consecutive Streak | Order of Merit rank | Previous best performance | Qualification |
|---|---|---|---|---|---|
| (Netherlands) Michael van Gerwen | 3rd | 3 | 1 | Winner (2013) | Order of Merit |
| (England) Phil Taylor | 11th | 11 | 2 | Winner (2005–2008, 2010, 2012) | Order of Merit |
| (Scotland) Gary Anderson | 5th | 5 | 3 | Winner (2011) | Order of Merit |
| (England) Adrian Lewis | 8th | 6 | 4 | Runner-up (2011) | Order of Merit |
| (Scotland) Peter Wright | 2nd | 2 | 5 | 5th (2014) | PDC Wildcard |
| (England) James Wade | 7th | 1 | 6 | Winner (2009) | PDC Wildcard |
| (England) Dave Chisnall | 2nd | 2 | 9 | 7th (2014) | PDC Wildcard |
| (Belgium) Kim Huybrechts | 1st | 1 | 17 | Debut | PDC Wildcard |
| (Netherlands) Raymond van Barneveld | 10th | 10 | 10 | Winner (2014) | Sky Sports Wildcard |
| (England) Stephen Bunting | 1st | 1 | 24 | Debut | Sky Sports Wildcard |

== Venues ==
| (England) Leeds | (England) Bournemouth | (England) Liverpool | (Northern Ireland) Belfast |
|---|---|---|---|
| Leeds Arena; Thursday 5 February | Bournemouth International Centre; Thursday 12 February | Liverpool Arena; Thursday 19 February | Odyssey Arena; Thursday 26 February |
| (England) Exeter | (England) Nottingham | (Scotland) Glasgow | (Republic of Ireland) Dublin |
| Westpoint Exeter; Thursday 4 March | Nottingham Arena; Thursday 11 March | SSE Hydro; Thursday 18 March | 3Arena; Thursday 25 March |
| (England) Manchester | (England) Sheffield | (Scotland) Aberdeen | (Wales) Cardiff |
| Manchester Arena; Thursday 2 April | Sheffield Arena; Thursday 9 April | AECC; Thursday 16 April | Cardiff International Arena; Thursday 23 April |
| (England) Birmingham | (England) Newcastle upon Tyne | (England) Brighton | (England) London |
| Arena Birmingham; Thursday 30 April | Newcastle Arena; Thursday 7 May | Brighton Centre; Thursday 14 May | The O_{2} Arena; Thursday 21 May |

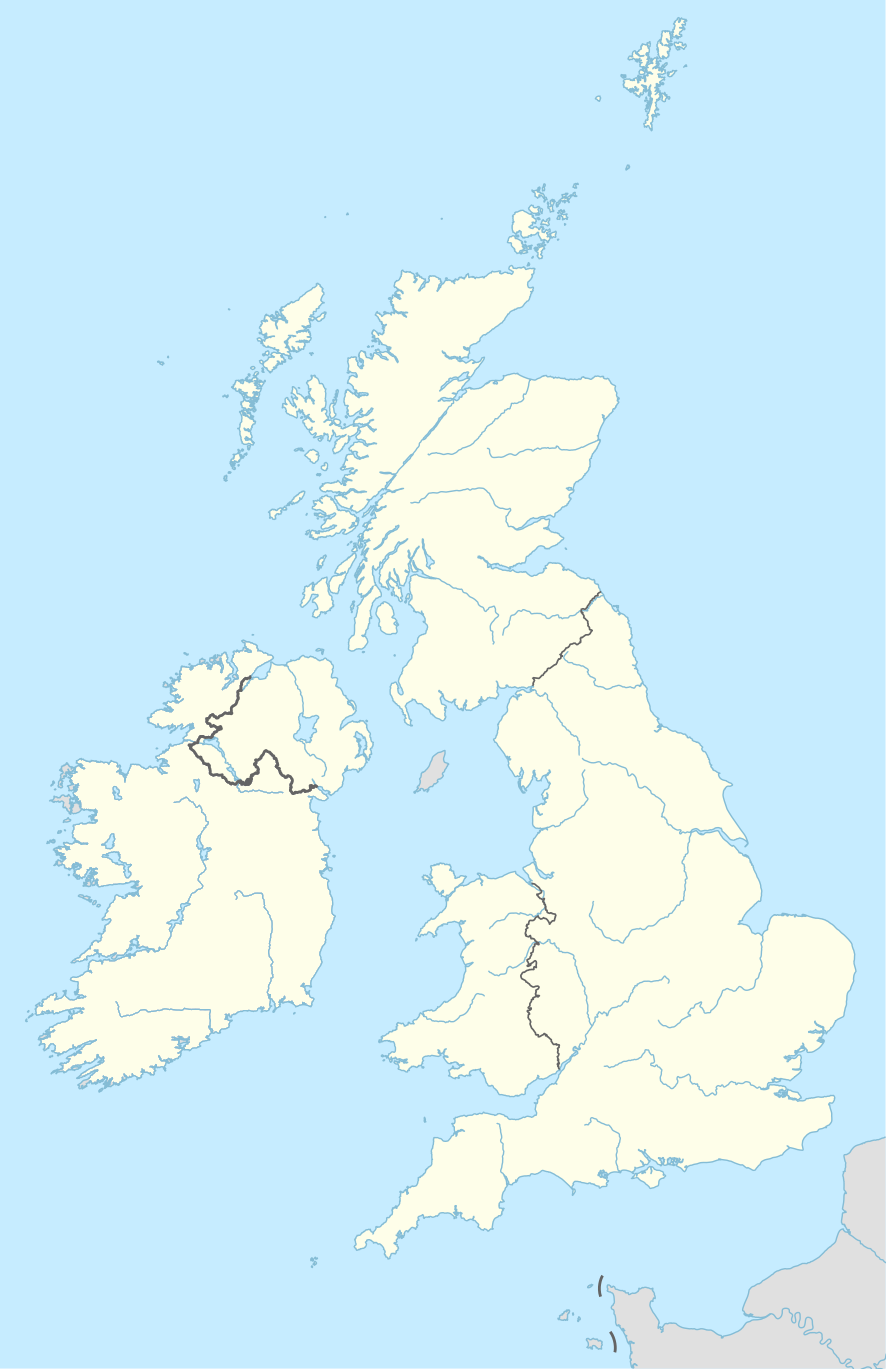
Locations of the 2015 Premier League venues

== Prize money ==
The prize money was dramatically increased to £700,000 from £550,000 in 2014.

| Stage | Prize money |
|---|---|
| Winner | £200,000 |
| Runner-up | £100,000 |
| Semi-finalists (x2) | £75,000 |
| 5th place | £60,000 |
| 6th place | £50,000 |
| 7th place | £45,000 |
| 8th place | £40,000 |
| 9th place | £30,000 |
| 10th place | £25,000 |
| Total | £700,000 |

== Results ==
=== League stage ===
==== 5 February – Week 1 (Phase 1) ====
(England) Leeds Arena, Leeds

| | Score | |
|---|---|---|
| Dave Chisnall (England); 94.16 | 7 – 1 | (Scotland) Peter Wright; 87.20 |
| Raymond van Barneveld (Netherlands); 85.68 | 1 – 7 | (England) Adrian Lewis; 113.80 |
| Kim Huybrechts (Belgium); 98.54 | 3 – 7 | (Netherlands) Michael van Gerwen; 107.72 |
| Gary Anderson (Scotland); 99.66 | 7 – 5 | (England) Phil Taylor; 104.72 |
| Stephen Bunting (England); 95.03 | 6 – 6 | (England) James Wade; 95.56 |
Night's Average: 98.21
Highest Checkout: (Netherlands) Michael van Gerwen 145
Most 180s: (England) Adrian Lewis 5
Night's 180s: 20

==== 12 February – Week 2 (Phase 1) ====
(England) Bournemouth International Centre, Bournemouth

| | Score | |
|---|---|---|
| Peter Wright (Scotland); 100.25 | 1 – 7 | (Scotland) Gary Anderson; 106.94 |
| Michael van Gerwen (Netherlands); 109.44 | 7 – 3 | (England) Stephen Bunting; 103.43 |
| Adrian Lewis (England); 97.97 | 2 – 7 | (England) Phil Taylor; 108.33 |
| James Wade (England); 104.09 | 7 – 2 | (Belgium) Kim Huybrechts; 93.57 |
| Dave Chisnall (England); 91.53 | 7 – 5 | (Netherlands) Raymond van Barneveld; 91.73 |
Night's Average: 100.73
Highest Checkout: (England) James Wade 143
Most 180s: (Netherlands) Michael van Gerwen & (England) Stephen Bunting 4
Night's 180s: 21

==== 19 February – Week 3 (Phase 1) ====
(England) Liverpool Arena, Liverpool

| | Score | |
|---|---|---|
| James Wade (England); 90.19 | 6 – 6 | (England) Dave Chisnall; 93.27 |
| Peter Wright (Scotland); 93.45 | 6 – 6 | (Netherlands) Raymond van Barneveld; 102.94 |
| Phil Taylor (England); 100.03 | 7 – 1 | (England) Stephen Bunting; 84.62 |
| Michael van Gerwen (Netherlands); 101.14 | 7 – 4 | (Scotland) Gary Anderson; 95.74 |
| Adrian Lewis (England); 92.16 | 6 – 6 | (Belgium) Kim Huybrechts; 88.98 |
Night's Average: 94.25
Highest Checkout: (England) Phil Taylor 151
Most 180s: (Netherlands) Raymond van Barneveld & (Scotland) Gary Anderson 5
Night's 180s: 31

==== 26 February – Week 4 (Phase 1) ====
(Northern Ireland) Odyssey Arena, Belfast

| | Score | |
|---|---|---|
| Kim Huybrechts (Belgium); 107.01 | 4 – 7 | (England) Dave Chisnall; 107.01 |
| Gary Anderson (Scotland); 98.64 | 7 – 4 | (England) James Wade; 94.60 |
| Michael van Gerwen (Netherlands); 106.28 | 6 – 6 | (England) Adrian Lewis; 98.32 |
| Stephen Bunting (England); 91.08 | 4 – 7 | (Netherlands) Raymond van Barneveld; 97.50 |
| Phil Taylor (England); 102.68 | 6 – 6 | (Scotland) Peter Wright; 97.55 |
Night's Average: 100.07
Highest Checkout: (England) Adrian Lewis 112
Most 180s: (Netherlands) Michael van Gerwen & (England) Dave Chisnall 6
Night's 180s: 35

==== 5 March – Week 5 (Phase 1) ====
(England) Westpoint Exeter, Exeter

| | Score | |
|---|---|---|
| Raymond van Barneveld (Netherlands); 102.65 | 5 – 7 | (Belgium) Kim Huybrechts; 105.59 |
| James Wade (England); 104.42 | 5 – 7 | (England) Phil Taylor; 106.48 |
| Adrian Lewis (England); 91.45 | 3 – 7 | (England) Stephen Bunting; 96.02 |
| Peter Wright (Scotland); 94.65 | 6 – 6 | (Netherlands) Michael van Gerwen; 95.57 |
| Dave Chisnall (England); 110.78 | 7 – 2 | (Scotland) Gary Anderson; 99.23 |
Night's Average: 100.6
Highest Checkout: (Belgium) Kim Huybrechts 170
Most 180s: (Belgium) Kim Huybrechts & (England) Dave Chisnall 6
Night's 180s: 26

==== 12 March – Week 6 (Phase 1) ====
(England) Nottingham Arena, Nottingham

| | Score | |
|---|---|---|
| Stephen Bunting (England); 100.99 | 7 – 3 | (England) Dave Chisnall; 99.55 |
| Raymond van Barneveld (Netherlands); 88.38 | 3 – 7 | (England) James Wade; 97.84 |
| Phil Taylor (England); 99.73 | 3 – 7 | (Netherlands) Michael van Gerwen; 107.61 |
| Gary Anderson (Scotland); 108.98 | 7 – 1 | (England) Adrian Lewis; 103.08 |
| Kim Huybrechts (Belgium); 97.77 | 5 – 7 | (Scotland) Peter Wright; 98.57 |
Night's Average: 100.25
Highest Checkout: (England) Stephen Bunting 164
Most 180s: (England) Dave Chisnall & (Scotland) Gary Anderson & (Scotland) Peter Wright 4
Night's 180s: 25

==== 19 March – Week 7 (Phase 1) ====
(Scotland) SSE Hydro, Glasgow

| | Score | |
|---|---|---|
| James Wade (England); 103.79 | 6 – 6 | (England) Adrian Lewis; 102.00 |
| Peter Wright (Scotland); 93.40 | 6 – 6 | (England) Stephen Bunting; 89.95 |
| Raymond van Barneveld (Netherlands); 104.18 | 7 – 4 | (England) Phil Taylor; 115.80 |
| Kim Huybrechts (Belgium); 98.04 | 5 – 7 | (Scotland) Gary Anderson; 100.70 |
| Dave Chisnall (England); 90.68 | 4 – 7 | (Netherlands) Michael van Gerwen; 93.18 |
Night's Average: 99.17
Highest Checkout: (Netherlands) Raymond van Barneveld 144
Most 180s: (England) Phil Taylor 9
Night's 180s: 42

==== 26 March – Week 8 (Phase 1) ====
(Republic of Ireland) 3Arena, Dublin

| | Score | |
|---|---|---|
| Adrian Lewis (England); 96.51 | 2 – 7 | (England) Dave Chisnall; 100.84 |
| Gary Anderson (Scotland); 96.80 | 7 – 4 | (England) Stephen Bunting; 95.57 |
| Peter Wright (Scotland); 87.81 | 3 – 7 | (England) James Wade; 92.15 |
| Michael van Gerwen (Netherlands); 108.71 | 7 – 2 | (Netherlands) Raymond van Barneveld; 104.37 |
| Phil Taylor (England); 104.04 | 7 – 4 | (Belgium) Kim Huybrechts; 96.73 |
Night's Average: 98.35
Highest Checkout: (Netherlands) Michael van Gerwen 160
Most 180s: (Netherlands) Michael van Gerwen 7
Night's 180s: 31

==== 2 April – Week 9 (Phase 1) ====
(England) Manchester Arena, Manchester

| | Score | |
|---|---|---|
| Michael van Gerwen (Netherlands); 100.97 | 7 – 4 | (England) James Wade; 100.64 |
| Phil Taylor (England); 93.55 | 4 – 7 | (England) Dave Chisnall; 95.78 |
| Stephen Bunting (England); 94.47 | 6 – 6 | (Belgium) Kim Huybrechts; 94.22 |
| Adrian Lewis (England); 96.29 | 7 – 4 | (Scotland) Peter Wright; 91.09 |
| Gary Anderson (Scotland); 108.83 | 6 – 6 | (Netherlands) Raymond van Barneveld; 100.18 |
Night's Average: 97.6
Highest Checkout: (Scotland) Peter Wright 170
Most 180s: (Scotland) Gary Anderson 7
Night's 180s: 28

==== 9 April – Week 10 (Phase 2) ====
(England) Sheffield Arena, Sheffield

| | Score | |
|---|---|---|
| Adrian Lewis (England); 96.77 | 7 – 4 | (England) James Wade; 97.02 |
| Gary Anderson (Scotland); 93.78 | 3 – 7 | (England) Dave Chisnall; 106.91 |
| Phil Taylor (England); 86.80 | 2 – 7 | (Netherlands) Raymond van Barneveld; 95.43 |
| Stephen Bunting (England); 95.43 | 5 – 7 | (Netherlands) Michael van Gerwen; 102.98 |
| Dave Chisnall (England); 114.17 | 7 – 1 | (England) James Wade; 87.12 |
Night's Average: 97.64
Highest Checkout: (England) Dave Chisnall 150
Most 180s (In 1 match): (England) Dave Chisnall 6
Night's 180s: 32

==== 16 April – Week 11 (Phase 2) ====
(Scotland) AECC, Aberdeen

| | Score | |
|---|---|---|
| Dave Chisnall (England); 102.96 | 3 – 7 | (England) Phil Taylor; 103.53 |
| Stephen Bunting (England); 93.92 | 2 – 7 | (England) Adrian Lewis; 97.96 |
| James Wade (England); 101.65 | 6 – 6 | (Scotland) Gary Anderson; 104.27 |
| Raymond van Barneveld (Netherlands); 98.98 | 7 – 3 | (Netherlands) Michael van Gerwen; 99.25 |
| Stephen Bunting (England); 95.30 | 6 – 6 | (England) Phil Taylor; 98.63 |
Night's Average: 99.65
Highest Checkout: (England) James Wade 170
Most 180s (In 1 match): (England) Phil Taylor & (Scotland) Gary Anderson 5
Night's 180s: 28

==== 23 April – Week 12 (Phase 2) ====
(Wales) Cardiff International Arena, Cardiff

| | Score | |
|---|---|---|
| Stephen Bunting (England); 90.53 | 7 – 1 | (Scotland) Gary Anderson; 82.98 |
| James Wade (England); 93.93 | 0 – 7 | (Netherlands) Michael van Gerwen; 116.90 |
| Raymond van Barneveld (Netherlands); 99.66 | 7 – 5 | (England) Dave Chisnall; 103.79 |
| Phil Taylor (England); 104.65 | 6 – 6 | (England) Adrian Lewis; 96.89 |
| Gary Anderson (Scotland); 105.94 | 7 – 5 | (Netherlands) Michael van Gerwen; 104.40 |
Night's Average: 99.97
Highest Checkout: (Netherlands) Michael van Gerwen 154
Most 180s (In 1 match): (Netherlands) Michael van Gerwen 5
Night's 180s: 26

==== 30 April – Week 13 (Phase 2) ====
(England) Arena Birmingham, Birmingham

| | Score | |
|---|---|---|
| Dave Chisnall (England); 100.33 | 7 – 4 | (England) Adrian Lewis; 101.94 |
| Raymond van Barneveld (Netherlands); 98.59 | 7 – 5 | (Scotland) Gary Anderson; 94.54 |
| James Wade (England); 94.65 | 6 – 6 | (England) Stephen Bunting; 93.15 |
| Michael van Gerwen (Netherlands); 112.91 | 7 – 4 | (England) Phil Taylor; 107.58 |
| Adrian Lewis (England); 89.64 | 2 – 7 | (Netherlands) Raymond van Barneveld; 95.82 |
Night's Average: 98.92
Highest Checkout: (Netherlands) Raymond van Barneveld 161
Most 180s (In 1 match): (Netherlands) Michael van Gerwen & (Netherlands) Raymond van Barneveld & (England) Stephen Bunting 5
Night's 180s: 32

==== 7 May – Week 14 (Phase 2) ====
(England) Newcastle Arena, Newcastle upon Tyne

| | Score | |
|---|---|---|
| Dave Chisnall (England); 104.50 | 7 – 1 | (England) Stephen Bunting; 90.19 |
| Adrian Lewis (England); 108.91 | 7 – 5 | (Netherlands) Michael van Gerwen; 103.38 |
| James Wade (England); 95.28 | 6 – 6 | (Netherlands) Raymond van Barneveld; 94.55 |
| Phil Taylor (England); 101.71 | 5 – 7 | (Scotland) Gary Anderson; 102.95 |
Night's Average: 100.18
Highest Checkout: (England) Dave Chisnall 137
Most 180s : (England) Adrian Lewis 7
Night's 180s: 29

==== 14 May – Week 15 (Phase 2) ====
(England) Brighton Centre, Brighton

| | Score | |
|---|---|---|
| Phil Taylor (England); 108.87 | 7 – 1 | (England) James Wade; 100.29 |
| Raymond van Barneveld (Netherlands); 101.62 | 7 – 4 | (England) Stephen Bunting; 100.27 |
| Adrian Lewis (England); 94.46 | 3 – 7 | (Scotland) Gary Anderson; 97.26 |
| Michael van Gerwen (Netherlands); 111.90 | 6 – 6 | (England) Dave Chisnall; 106.01 |
Night's Average: 102.59
Highest Checkout: (England) Dave Chisnall 161
Most 180s : (Netherlands) Michael van Gerwen & (England) Stephen Bunting 5
Night's 180s: 27

=== Play-offs – 21 May ===
(England) The O_{2} Arena, London

| | Score | |
|---|---|---|
Semi-finals (best of 19 legs)
| Dave Chisnall (England); 98.34 | 9 – 10 | (Scotland) Gary Anderson; 98.40 |
| Michael van Gerwen (Netherlands); 106.44 | 10 – 8 | (Netherlands) Raymond van Barneveld; 100.44 |
Final (best of 21 legs)
| Michael van Gerwen (Netherlands); 105.81 | 7 – 11 | (Scotland) Gary Anderson; 104.85 |
Night's Average: 102.38
Highest Checkout: (England) Dave Chisnall 152

== Table and streaks ==
=== Table ===
After the first nine weeks (phase 1), the bottom two in the table are eliminated. Each remaining player plays a further seven matches (phase 2). The top four players then participate in the playoffs.

When players are tied on points, leg difference is used first as a tie-breaker, after that legs won against throw and then tournament average.

| # | Name | Pld | W | D | L | Pts | LF | LA | +/- | LWAT | 100+ | 140+ | 180s | A | HC | C% |
|---|---|---|---|---|---|---|---|---|---|---|---|---|---|---|---|---|
| 1 | (Netherlands) Michael van Gerwen RU | 16 | 10 | 3 | 3 | 23 | 101 | 71 | +30 | 38 | 183 | 153 | 58 | 105.15 | 160 | 47.87% |
| 2 | (England) Dave Chisnall | 16 | 10 | 2 | 4 | 22 | 97 | 67 | +30 | 38 | 191 | 121 | 62 | 101.39 | 161 | 42.17% |
| 3 | (Scotland) Gary Anderson W | 16 | 9 | 2 | 5 | 20 | 90 | 80 | +10 | 28 | 212 | 126 | 57 | 99.83 | 152 | 38.14% |
| 4 | (Netherlands) Raymond van Barneveld | 16 | 8 | 3 | 5 | 19 | 90 | 82 | +8 | 31 | 227 | 120 | 48 | 97.64 | 161 | 41.86% |
| 5 | (England) Phil Taylor | 16 | 6 | 3 | 7 | 15 | 87 | 83 | +4 | 30 | 246 | 124 | 43 | 102.95 | 151 | 39.55% |
| 6 | (England) Adrian Lewis | 16 | 5 | 4 | 7 | 14 | 76 | 89 | −13 | 23 | 189 | 119 | 51 | 98.63 | 147 | 38.04% |
| 7 | (England) James Wade | 16 | 3 | 6 | 7 | 12 | 76 | 93 | −17 | 26 | 236 | 144 | 23 | 97.12 | 170 | 41.14% |
| 8 | (England) Stephen Bunting | 16 | 3 | 5 | 8 | 11 | 75 | 93 | −18 | 26 | 181 | 112 | 46 | 94.37 | 164 | 32.86% |
| 9 | (Scotland) Peter Wright | 9 | 1 | 4 | 4 | 6 | 40 | 57 | −17 | 10 | 144 | 71 | 18 | 93.77 | 170 | 36.96% |
| 10 | (Belgium) Kim Huybrechts | 9 | 1 | 2 | 6 | 4 | 42 | 59 | −17 | 7 | 116 | 71 | 27 | 97.83 | 170 | 34.15% |

Last updated: 15 May 2015
Source: Match reports from the results section.

Top four qualified for the Play-offs after Week 15.
NB: LWAT = Legs Won Against Throw. A = Average C% = Checkout Percentage HC = High Checkout.

=== Streaks ===
| Player | 1st Phase | | | | | | | | | 2nd Phase | | | | | | | | | | Play-offs | |
| Player | 1 | 2 | 3 | 4 | 5 | 6 | 7 | 8 | 9 | 10 | | 11 | | 12 | | 13 | | 14 | 15 | SF | F |
|---|---|---|---|---|---|---|---|---|---|---|---|---|---|---|---|---|---|---|---|---|---|
| (Netherlands) Michael van Gerwen | W | W | W | D | D | W | W | W | W | W | | L | | W | L | W | | L | D | W | L |
| (England) Dave Chisnall | W | W | D | W | W | L | L | W | W | W | W | L | | L | | W | | W | D | L | —N/a |
| (Scotland) Gary Anderson | W | W | L | W | L | W | W | W | D | L | | D | | L | W | L | | W | W | W | W |
| (Netherlands) Raymond van Barneveld | L | L | D | W | L | L | W | L | D | W | | W | | W | | W | W | D | W | L | —N/a |
| (England) Phil Taylor | L | W | W | D | W | L | L | W | L | L | | W | D | D | | L | | L | W | Eliminated | |
| (England) Adrian Lewis | W | L | D | D | L | L | D | L | W | W | | W | | D | | L | L | W | L | Eliminated | |
| (England) James Wade | D | W | D | L | L | W | D | W | L | L | L | D | | L | | D | | D | L | Eliminated | |
| (England) Stephen Bunting | D | L | L | L | W | W | D | L | D | L | | L | D | W | | D | | L | L | Eliminated | |
| (Scotland) Peter Wright | L | L | D | D | D | W | D | L | L | Eliminated | | | | | | | | | | | |
| (Belgium) Kim Huybrechts | L | L | D | L | W | L | L | L | D | Eliminated | | | | | | | | | | | |

| Legend: | W | Win | D | Draw | L | Loss | —N/a | Eliminated |

=== Positions by round ===
| Player | Round | | | | | | | | | | | | | | | |
| Player | 1 | 2 | 3 | 4 | 5 | 6 | 7 | 8 | 9 | 10 | 11 | 12 | 13 | 14 | 15 | 16 |
|---|---|---|---|---|---|---|---|---|---|---|---|---|---|---|---|---|
| (Netherlands) Michael van Gerwen | 3 | 1 | 1 | 1 | 2 | 1 | 1 | 1 | 1 | 1 | 1 | 1 | 1 | 1 | 1 | 1 |
| (England) Dave Chisnall | 2 | 2 | 2 | 2 | 1 | 2 | 3 | 3 | 2 | 2 | 2 | 2 | 2 | 2 | 2 | 2 |
| (Scotland) Gary Anderson | 4 | 3 | 5 | 3 | 4 | 3 | 2 | 2 | 3 | 3 | 3 | 3 | 4 | 3 | 3 | 3 |
| (Netherlands) Raymond van Barneveld | 10 | 8 | 7 | 7 | 7 | 9 | 8 | 8 | 8 | 7 | 7 | 5 | 3 | 4 | 4 | 4 |
| (England) Phil Taylor | 7 | 5 | 3 | 4 | 3 | 4 | 4 | 5 | 5 | 4 | 4 | 4 | 5 | 6 | 5 | 5 |
| (England) Adrian Lewis | 1 | 6 | 6 | 6 | 6 | 8 | 9 | 9 | 7 | 6 | 5 | 6 | 6 | 5 | 6 | 6 |
| (England) James Wade | 5 | 4 | 4 | 5 | 5 | 5 | 5 | 4 | 4 | 5 | 6 | 8 | 8 | 7 | 7 | 7 |
| (England) Stephen Bunting | 6 | 7 | 9 | 10 | 8 | 6 | 6 | 6 | 6 | 8 | 8 | 7 | 7 | 8 | 8 | 8 |
| (Scotland) Peter Wright | 9 | 10 | 10 | 8 | 10 | 7 | 7 | 7 | 9 | Eliminated | | | | | | |
| (Belgium) Kim Huybrechts | 8 | 9 | 8 | 9 | 9 | 10 | 10 | 10 | 10 | Eliminated | | | | | | |
