= GIM =

GIM or Gim may refer to:

- Cen (surname), sometimes romanized as Gim, Khim, or Chim in Taiwanese Hokkien
- Gim (food), a Korean-style laver, sometimes romanized as Kim
- Gim (sword) (Gim3 in Jyutping), the Cantonese name of the jian, a long sword used in China
- Gim (Armenian letter), also romanized as Kim, or K’im
- Gīm, or Ğīm, the fifth letter of the Arabic abjad alphabet ج, also romanized as Jīm
- Kim (Korean name) or Gim, a Korean surname

== Acronyms ==
- Moluccan Evangelical Church (in Indonesian: Geredja Indjili Maluku), a church for the Moluccan Dutch in the Netherlands
- GIM mechanism (for Glashow–Iliopoulos–Maiani), a mechanism in quantum field theory
- Goa Institute of Management, an Indian Business School
- Gruppe Internationale Marxisten (the International Marxist Group), a former Trotskyist group in Germany from 1968 to 1986
- Guided Imagery and Music, a technique used in music therapy

== People with the given name ==
- Gim Allon, a character in the DC Comics universe

== See also ==
- Kim (disambiguation)
