= Kim Wall =

Kim Wall may refer to:

- Kim Wall (actor), British actor
- Kim Wall (journalist) (1987–2017), Swedish freelance journalist, murder victim
- Kim Wall (sprinter) (born 1983), British sprinter
