= Kim family =

The Kim family or Kim clan may refer to the following Korean groups:

- Kim family (North Korea), the rulers of North Korea since Kim Il Sung in 1948
- Gimhae Kim clan associated with the Geumgwan Gaya
- later rulers of Silla, mostly members of the Gyeongju Kim clan
- Andong Kim clan of the Joseon dynasty
- Jeonju Kim clan
