= Kim A. Williams =

American cardiologist

- Born: 1954 (age 71–72); Chicago, Illinois, US
- Education: MD
- Alma mater: University of Chicago Pritzker School of Medicine
- Occupations: Chair, UofL Dept. of Medicine, Doctor, Professor, Cardiovascular health, Prevention of cardiovascular disease
- Employer: University of Louisville School of Medicine

Kim Allan Williams Sr. (born 1954) is an American cardiologist and advocate of plant-based nutrition. He is a Fellow of the American College of Cardiology and served as its president from 2015 to 2016. He is currently a trustee of the organization.

== Education ==
Williams graduated from the University of Chicago in 1975 and the Pritzker School of Medicine at the University of Chicago in 1979.

== Career ==
He has board certifications in internal medicine, cardiovascular diseases, nuclear medicine, nuclear cardiology, and cardiovascular computed tomography. He has served on the faculty of the Pritzker School of Medicine, the Wayne State University School of Medicine in Detroit, Michigan, and in 2013 at Rush University Medical Center in Chicago where he managed the Urban Cardiology Initiative.

Williams has served as president of the American Society of Nuclear Cardiology, chairman of the Coalition of Cardiovascular Organizations, and chairman of the board of the Association of Black Cardiologists, among other positions. In July 2022, Williams became the 24th Chair of the University of Louisville Department of Medicine in Louisville, KY, where he serves as professor of medicine and the Legacy Foundation of Kentuckiana Endowed Chair in Health Equity.

== Plant-based diet ==
Williams has been vegan since 2003; after being selected as incoming president of the American College of Cardiology in 2014, he published an essay on his reasons for being vegan and his belief in the cardiovascular benefits of veganism in MedPage Today. Some questioned his views and motives for writing the essay, but Williams maintained that his enthusiasm for plant-based diets was based on his interpretation of medical literature and his own experience lowering his cholesterol by removing dairy and animal protein.

Williams avoids using the term vegan due to its ethical implications. His motivation has been described as "purely medical".

In 2020, he wrote the foreword to Healthy at Last, a book about plant-based eating by Eric Adams, at the time the Borough President of Brooklyn, New York City, and now mayor of New York City. In 2026, he was featured as one of the experts in Dr. Michael Greger's How Not to Die documentary.
