= Kim Jones (artist) =

American artist

Kim Jones (born 1944) is a contemporary artist who lives and works in New York City.

Kim Jones began his career in Los Angeles in the mid-1960s as a performance artist, and became primarily known for his alter ego, Mudman—a shaman-like itinerant caked in mud and other organic substances who appeared on city streets, subways, galleries, and museums wearing a cumbersome lattice structure of sticks on his back. In the 1980s Jones moved to New York, where his work (including performance, sculpture, drawings, and writing) has continued to address the themes of war, healing, and destruction.

== Early life ==
Jones was born in San Bernardino, California. As a child he was diagnosed with Perthes, a Polio-like illness that confined him to a wheelchair and leg braces from ages seven to ten. Thirteen years later he served for a year as a Marine in the Vietnam War from 1967 to 1968. Jones received his BFA from the California Institute of Arts (1971) and MFA from the Otis Art Institute (1973) at a time when the Southern California performance and conceptual art movements were garnering international recognition. Influenced by alternative lifestyles and non-Western religious practices and cultures, Jones, along with peers such as Chris Burden, Suzanne Lacy, Paul McCarthy, and Barbara T. Smith, enacted body-based performances that commented on a wide range of topical issues, including the war, violence against women, civil rights, and sexual liberation.

== Mud Man ==
Jones's stick and foam rubber sculptures—tightly bound in what would become his signature materials of nylon, rope, and electrical tape—grew larger in scale and ultimately merged with his body, transforming Jones into the walking sculpture Mudman. Caked in mud and other organic substances, Mudman first appeared in what became known as the "Wilshire Boulevard Walk" on January 28, 1976, on Wilshire Boulevard in Los Angeles, sponsored by Carp. He continued to appear in urban areas and galleries wearing a sculptural headdress and burdened by a lattice structure of sticks on his back, presenting a formidable sight that has invited comparisons to the homeless, camouflaged soldiers, peasants, or any number of mystic figures found in religions worldwide.

Art historian Marcia Tucker described Mudman as "a shamanistic figure, performing solitary, primitive rituals in a time and place not his own, but belonging to other cultures and other lands. He is a catalyst, suggesting mythological beings (half man, half beast), the stuff of legends and fairy tales, the visionary dimension of human endeavor."

== Rat Piece ==
Kim Jones's most controversial performance was "Rat Piece", which took place in 1976 at California State University in Los Angeles. During this notorious onstage piece, Jones (as Mudman) unveiled a wire cage holding three live rats, which he doused with lighter fluid and set on fire. This controversial performance led to the gallery director's dismissal and a court case for the artist.

== Exhibitions ==
Jones's work has been featured in significant group exhibitions, including the 52nd International Art Exhibition at the Venice Biennial (2007), Disparities & Deformations: Our Grotesque, Site Santa Fe (2004); Out of Actions: Between Performance and the Object at the Museum of Contemporary Art Los Angeles (1998); and Mapping at the Museum of Modern Art, New York (1994). Kim Jones: A Retrospective (2006–08) chronicles over thirty years of the artist's performances, drawings and sculpture and was organized by the UB Art Gallery, The State University of New York, Buffalo, and the Luck man Fine Arts Complex, California State University, Los Angeles.

== Awards ==
In 2009 Jones won a Fellow Award in the Visual Arts from United States Artists.
