= Kim (cigarette) =

Former German cigarette brand

- Product type: Cigarette
- Produced by: British American Tobacco
- Country: West Germany
- Introduced: 1940s
- Discontinued: 1960s, re-introduced in 1970, then discontinued again in 2009
- Markets: Europe, Cuba
- Previous owners: Oriental-Kim Cigaretten-Werk G.m.b.H.
- Tagline: See Advertising slogans

Kim was a German brand of cigarettes that was manufactured by British American Tobacco.

The correct product brand name was Kim Slimsize and came in a few varieties, most notably Kim Red Slimsize and Kim Blue Slimsize.

== History ==
The brand was originally founded in the 1940s by "Oriental-Kim Cigaretten-Werk G.m.b.H." and re-introduced in 1970 by BAT Germany, the cigarette has a length of 9.5 cm and looks striking especially because of its slim shape. The mark was protected in 1972 in Germany and is popular with women, which is why the brand is also often referred to as a "Woman's cigarette". It has been discontinued since 2009.

Main market was Germany. Other markets were Belgium, Netherlands, France, Austria, Italy, Poland, Hungary, Romania, Czech Republic, Slovenia, Belarus and Australia and Cuba.

== Packaging ==
The box is completely white from the opening until the middle of the packaging. At the bottom of the pack a wave pattern is visible, depending on the variant either in orange-red (Red Slimsize) or turquoise-blue (Blue Slimsize).

== Advertising slogans ==
- 1970: "Pleasure, which suits us."
- 1970: "Lean and racy head up embers."
- 1971: "Talk a little - Kim a little."
- 1972: "Too chic for a man's hands."
- 1988: "Not like all the others"

== Products ==
Pack of Kim cigarettes

- Kim Red Slimsize
- Kim Blue Slimsize

Below are all the current brands of Kim cigarettes sold, with the levels of tar, nicotine and carbon monoxide included.

Pack	Tar	Nicotine	Carbon monoxide
Kim Red Slimsize	8 mg	0,6 mg	9 mg
Kim Blue Slimsize	3 mg	0,3 mg	3 mg

== See also ==
- Tobacco smoking

== Literature ==
- "Das Längere hat was", Der Spiegel, 29 November, no. 49, 1975
