= Kim Perell =

American serial entrepreneur, business executive, speaker, author and startup mentor

- Born: circa 1976/1977; Portland, Oregon, USA
- Education: Pepperdine University; University of Belgrano
- Occupations: Co-founder and CEO of 100.co author investor
- Website: kimperell.com

Kim Reed Perell is an American serial entrepreneur, business executive, speaker, author and startup mentor, based in Miami, Florida.

Perell has authored two books, The Execution Factor: The One Skill that Drives Success, and Jump: Dare To Do What Scares You In Business And In Life. She is Founder and CEO of 100.co, an AI-based online marketplace for brands and products development and marketing.

== Early life ==
Perell was born and raised in Portland, Oregon. She attended college at Pepperdine University, graduating magna cum laude with a Bachelor of Science in Business administration. In an interview on Fox Business News, Perell said that she followed in the path of her parents, who were both entrepreneurs, to take advantage of the digital economy and the Internet to launch her career.

== Career ==
Perell is best known as the former chief executive officer of Amobee, a subsidiary of Singtel. She is also known for her work at Xdrive, a tech startup.

At the age of 22, Perell joined Xdrive Technology. Promoted to Director of Marketing and Sales. During her first year, Perell recruited 10 million users to the company's services and generated over $9 million in advertising.

Perell later founded Frontline Direct in 2003 and focused on marketing. Frontline Direct reached $3.5 million in revenue in 2005 and more than $100 million by 2010. The company's client base grew from 63 customers to 380 while personnel grew from five employees to 74. Perell sold Frontline to Adconion Media Group, after which the two merged to form Adconion Direct located in Santa Monica, California. Perell remained as CEO after the merger, and became the first woman appointed to the board. In 2014, Adconion Direct was bought by Amobee, a subsidiary of Singtel, an Asian telecommunications company, for $235 million. Perell was named President of Amobee and later promoted to CEO in December 2016.

Perell then led the acquisition of Turn, a data management company, in February 2017.

Perell stepped down as CEO of Amobee in December 2019 to pursue her passion of supporting startup entrepreneurs.

Perell is also a startup mentor for women entrepreneurs in the San Diego area.

=== 100.co ===
In 2021, Kim Perell founded 100.co, a digital technology company for brands and products development. Perell relocated from San Diego to Miami, where the company has its current headquarters. According to a number of sources, the company leverages artificial intelligence "to analyze trends and develop brands around consumer preferences", in particular, by using CLAIRE intelligence platform. The company specializes in Consumer packaged goods companies and involves influencers.

In May 2021, the company acquired Cherry Pick AI, a New York-based predictive intelligence platform for product development. In June 2021, the company bought AI.PARC startup and acquired its Artificial Intelligence (AI), Machine Learning (ML) and Natural Language Processing (NLP) patents to upgrade its database tools.

== Author ==
Perell's book, The Execution Factor: The One Skill that Drives Success, was a USA Today National Best-Selling Book. It debuted at No. 2 on the LA Times' bestseller list.

- Perell, Kim (2018). The Execution Factor: The One Skill that Drives Success. McGraw Hill Professional. ISBN 978-1-260-12853-6. by McGraw Hill Professional
- Perell, Kim (2021). Jump: Dare To Do What Scares You In Business And In Life. HarperCollins Leadership. ISBN 978-1-400-22945-1. by HarperCollins

== Investments ==
Perell is an active angel investor.

== Extra links ==
- 100.co
