= Kim (surname) =

Kim is a surname with multiple origins.

== Korean family name ==
Kim, sometimes spelt Gim, is the most common family name in Korea.

== Stage surname ==
People with the stage surname Kim include:

- Andy Kim (singer), Canadian musician, born Andrew Youakim
- Sandra Kim, Belgian singer, born Sandra Caldarone

== Fictional characters ==
Fictional characters with the surname Kim, whether or not any indication is given of ethnic origins, include:

  - Kim Kaphwan
  - Kim Dong Han or Kim Jae Hoon, regular characters in Garou: Mark of the Wolves
  - Harry Kim in the television series Star Trek: Voyager
  - Lane Kim in the television series Gilmore Girls

== See also ==
- Kim (given name)
- Kim (disambiguation) (other meanings)
