= Kim, Republic of Bashkortostan =

Kim Ким
- Selo
- Location within Bashkortostan Location within Russia
- Coordinates: 53°53′N 54°36′E
- Country: Russia
- Region: Bashkortostan
- District: Alsheyevsky District
- Time zone: UTC+5:00

Kim (Russian: Ким) is a rural locality (a selo) in Aksyonovsky Selsoviet, Alsheyevsky District, Bashkortostan, Russia. The population was 878 as of 2010. There are 10 streets.

== Geography ==
Kim is located 36 km southwest of Rayevsky (the district's administrative centre) by road. Aksyonovo is the nearest rural locality.
