= Kim Huybrechts =

Belgian darts player (born 1985)

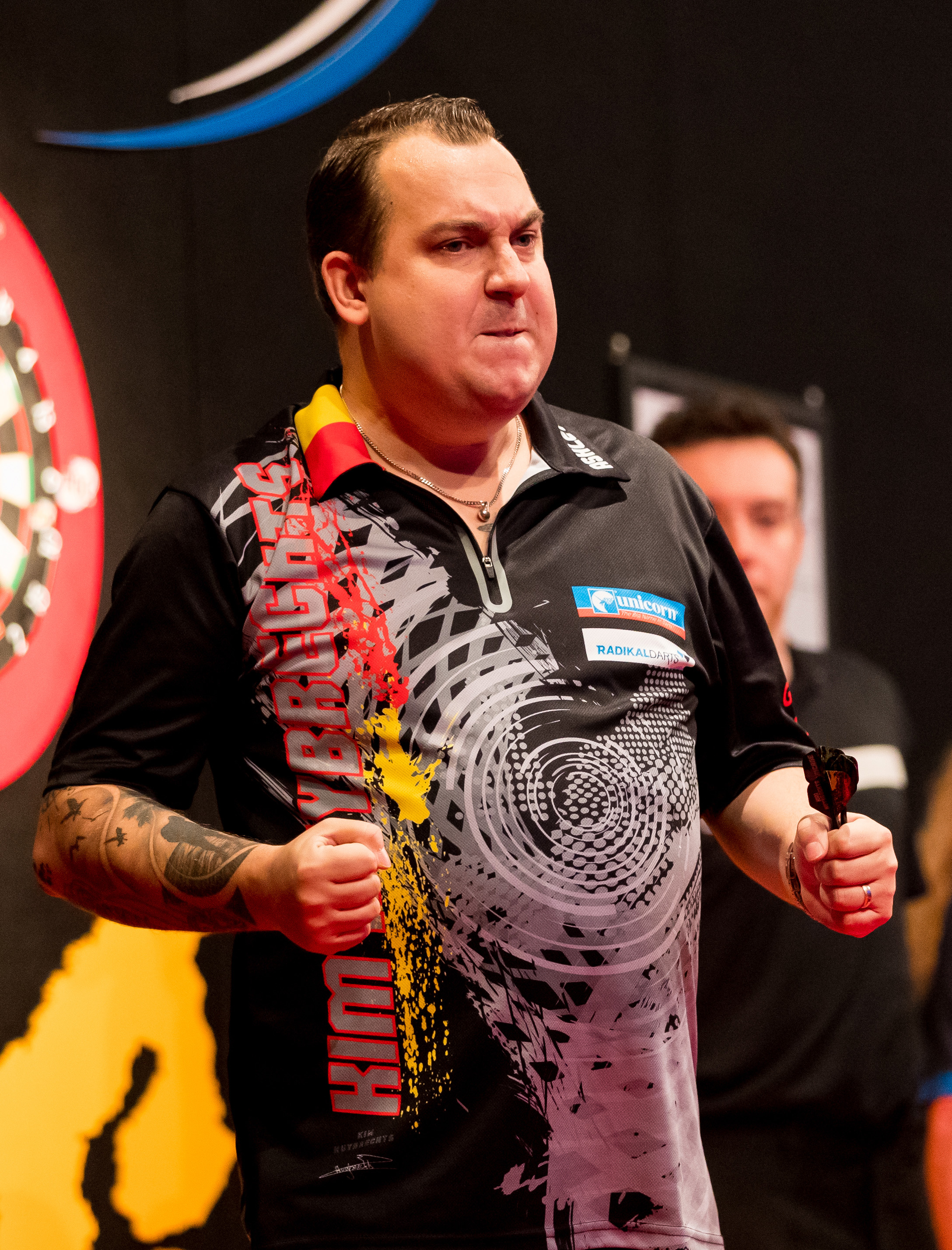
- Huybrechts in 2019

Personal information
- Nickname: "The Hurricane"
- Born: 16 November 1985 (age 41) Antwerp, Belgium

Sport
- Sport: Darts
- Playing since: 1995
- Darts: 24g Bull's NL Signature
- Laterality: Right-handed
- Walk-on music: "Bonzai Channel One" by Mark With A K and Jan Verloet

Organisation (see split in darts)
- BDO: 2006–2011
- PDC: 2011–present (Tour Card: 2012–present)
- Current world ranking: (PDC) 44 ▲2 (5 November 2026)

WDF major events – best performances
- World Masters: Last 16: 2009

PDC premier events – best performances
- World Championship: Quarter-final: 2012
- World Matchplay: Last 16: 2018
- World Grand Prix: Quarter-final: 2016
- UK Open: Quarter-final: 2017
- Grand Slam: Semi-final: 2014
- European Championship: Semi-final: 2012
- Premier League: 10th: 2015, 2017
- Championship League: 6th Winners group: 2013
- PC Finals: Runner-up: 2012
- Masters: Quarter-final: 2016
- World Series Finals: Quarter-final: 2021

Other tournament wins
- Years
Belgium Championship	2007
Belgium Gold Cup	2007
Belgium Open Pairs	2013, 2014
Flanders Open	2008
Oost Vlaanderen	2011
Open Venlo	2011
UK Open Qualifier	2013
European Tour Events (x2)
Dutch Darts Masters	2013
European Darts Grand Prix	2015
Players Championships (x2)
2013, 2023
Medal record
Men's Darts
Representing Belgium
EDF European Championship
Gold medal – first place	2022 Podčetrtek	Men's singles
Bronze medal – third place	2017 Podčetrtek	Men's cricket
Bronze medal – third place	2018 Podčetrtek	Men's singles
Bronze medal – third place	2019 Podčetrtek	Men's singles

Kim Huybrechts (born 16 November 1985) is a Belgian professional darts player who competes in Professional Darts Corporation (PDC) events. He reached his first PDC major final at the 2012 Players Championship Finals, losing to Phil Taylor 13–6. He also made the final of the 2013 PDC World Cup of Darts, representing Belgium alongside his brother Ronny. Huybrechts has won 5 PDC Pro Tour titles during his professional career.

== Playing career ==
=== Early career ===
Huybrechts' first tournament wins came in 2007 at the Belgium Gold Cup and the Belgium National Championships. His only victory in a British Darts Organisation sanctioned event came at the 2008 Flanders Open where he defeated Geert De Vos 5–2 in the final. Huybrechts reached the last 16 of the 2009 Winmau World Masters, losing 3–1 to Steve West on his televised debut.

In September 2010, he was a quarter-finalist at a PDC Pro Tour Players Championship in Nuland. Later that year, he narrowly missed out on qualifying for the 2011 BDO World Darts Championship, losing to Arno Merk in the final qualifying round.

In May 2011, he reached the semi-finals of a Players Championship in Vienna. He lost 6–5 to Denis Ovens, having missed three match darts. This result helped him to qualify for the 2011 European Championship via the European Order of Merit. In the first round, Huybrechts defeated Spain's Antonio Alcinas 6–2. He then beat Wes Newton 10–8 in the second round to book his place in the quarter-finals, where he narrowly lost 10–8 to world champion Adrian Lewis.

=== Breakthrough ===
His performance during the European Championship and other Pro Tour Events secured him a place in the top 16 of the PDC Pro Tour Order of Merit and thus a place in the World Championships for the first time. Huybrechts had a fantastic debut in the tournament as he managed to reach the quarter-finals. He enjoyed a dream first round match by defeating Brendan Dolan 3–0, with the Irishman only picking up two legs during the match and continued his fine form to beat James Richardson 4–1 in the second round. He dropped the first set in the last 16 against Paul Nicholson, but then went on an incredible run by winning 12 of the next 14 legs to triumph 4–1. His tournament was ended in the last 8 by Andy Hamilton as he lost 2–5 with a 91.7 average, over 10 points lower than his opponents. Huybrechts revealed after the match that his performances had earned him new sponsors, which will help him play all the tournaments on the PDC circuit for two years and admitted that it was his "biggest achievement of his career to date".

He then represented Belgium with Kurt van de Rijck in the 2012 PDC World Cup of Darts and reached the quarter-finals, where they were defeated by Australia 1–3, having beaten Sweden in the second round. Huybrechts made the final of the first UK Open qualifier, losing out to Wes Newton 3–6 after earlier beating Scott Rand, Simon Whitlock, Vincent van der Voort, Mark Stephenson, Mark Hylton, Michael van Gerwen and Stuart White. Huybrechts earned a place in the European Tour 1 event in Vienna by defeating Tonči Restović and Jerry Hendricks in the European qualifier. He enjoyed 6–3 and 6–0 wins over Andy Smith and Vincent van der Voort respectively, before losing in the third round to James Wade 1–6. Huybrechts threw a nine-darter in a third round match in the seventh UK Open qualifier of the season against Terry Jenkins, but went on to lose 4–6. He also qualified for the second European Tour event courtesy of wins over Carlos Rodríguez and Tonči Restović in the European Qualifier. Huybrechts reached the quarter-finals where he was beaten by Simon Whitlock 4–6.

At the UK Open he defeated Peter Hudson and Vincent van der Voort to face Wes Newton in the last 16. Huybrechts led 7–4 having hit seven doubles from as many attempts, but his finishing power soon deserted him and he went on to miss five darts to win the game in the final leg and lost 8–9. By July, Huybrechts had reached the quarter-final stage or better on ten occasions in PDC events in 2012, meaning he qualified for the World Matchplay for the first time due to being the highest player on the ProTour Order of Merit who was not in the world's top 16. He played Terry Jenkins in the first round and looked to be heading for a comfortable victory as he led 9–5. However, Huybrechts failed to convert multiple chances to take the match as he dropped six legs in a row to lose 9–11.

Huybrechts went one better at the 2012 European Championship than his 2011 performance as he reached his maiden semi-final of a PDC major event. He beat Vincent van der Voort and Ian White in the opening rounds, before extending his record over Raymond van Barneveld to played five, won five, courtesy of a 10–8 victory. In his semi-final he was beaten 9–11 by Simon Whitlock, but his run in the tournament saw him move into world's top 32 for the first time. Huybrechts had a disastrous debut at the World Grand Prix in October, as he lost 0–2 in sets to Kevin Painter without winning a leg, but returned to form at the Dutch Darts Masters, by reaching his fifth semi-final of the year. There, he was beaten 1–6 by Whitlock.

After all 33 ProTour events of 2012 had been played, Huybrechts finished ninth on the Order of Merit to qualify for the Players Championship Finals for the first time. It was there that Huybrechts reached his debut major final with comfortable victories over Vincent van der Voort, Michael Smith, Peter Wright and Justin Pipe, with his average of 104.34 against Wright in the quarter-finals being at the time his highest on television. He faced Phil Taylor in the final and kept pace in the early stages with Taylor's heavy scoring by clinically finishing legs on his own throw to level the match at 5–5. However, the pressure exerted on Huybrechts eventually told as he only won one out of the next nine legs to lose 6–13.

=== 2013 ===
Huybrechts' father Ludo Huybrechts (1947–2012) died on 11 December nine days before his son's first round match in the 2013 World Championship. Huybrechts still decided to compete in the event and although he led 2–1 in sets against Scott Rand, he went on to lose 2–3. However, after the tournament he broke into the world's top 20 for the first time. Huybrechts partnered his brother Ronny in the World Cup of Darts, becoming the first brothers to do so and had a spectacular run to reach the final of the event. Highlights included a 5–1 doubles win over the Australian pair of Simon Whitlock and Paul Nicholson, averaging 101.08 in beating Croatia 4–0 in the quarter-finals, and averaging 105.47 in their semi-finals victory over Finland, at the time the highest ever in a doubles match in the history of the event. They faced the English partnership of Phil Taylor and Adrian Lewis in the final, with Kim beating Lewis 4–0, but Ronny lost both of his singles matches. Kim had to defeat Taylor to force a doubles match to decide the title, however, he lost 1–4. Huybrechts lost 5–6 to Michael van Gerwen in the sixth 2013 UK Open Qualifier of the year in April. He went one better in the seventh event, sealing his first title on the PDC tour with a 6–2 win over John Part in the final having earlier exacted his revenge over van Gerwen in the fifth round by beating him 6–4. His performances after all eight events had been played saw him finish third on the UK Open Order of Merit, but he lost 6–9 to Terry Jenkins in the fourth round. Huybrechts was the victim of clinical finishing in the first round of the World Grand Prix as Andy Hamilton hit six out of six doubles to beat him 2–0 in sets. However, less than two weeks later he claimed his second Pro Tour title of 2013 at the 12th Players Championship by whitewashing Kevin Painter 6–0 in the final which included a 170 checkout in the second leg. He then took the final spot for the Winners Group of the Championship League by winning Group 8 with a 6–4 success over Peter Wright in the final. There, Huybrechts won three of his seven games to finish sixth in the eight man table. The biggest title of Huybrechts' career to date followed as he claimed the Dutch Darts Masters in Veldhoven. He defeated Van Gerwen 6–3 in the semi-finals but saved his best performance for the final as he averaged 105.90 in defeating Brendan Dolan also by a 6–3 scoreline. Huybrechts said afterwards that he read text messages sent by his late father for inspiration before the final and dedicated the victory to him. His tournament average over the six games was 101. Huybrechts was now into the top 16 on the Order of Merit and therefore earned a place in the inaugural Masters. He faced Adrian Lewis in the first round and missed two darts at tops in the deciding leg to lose 6–5 despite an average of 106.43. Despite only winning one of his three group games at the Grand Slam of Darts, Huybrechts finished second to qualify for the last 16 on leg difference. He played Ronny which saw them become the first brothers to play in a televised darts match, with Kim winning 10–5. Huybrechts played Lewis on his 28th birthday in the quarter-finals and was beaten 16–11.

=== 2014 ===
Huybrechts qualified for the 2014 PDC World Darts Championship as the 12th seed and remarkably was drawn to once again face off with his brother Ronny in the first round. Kim survived a scare as he lost the first set and saw Ronny miss a total of five darts to win the second and recovered to triumph 3–1. Kim described facing his brother as the hardest and most nerve-wracking game of his life and that he was also feeling sorry for Ronny when he was missing doubles. Huybrechts hit back from 3–0 behind in the next round against Ian White to level the game, but missed too many chances in the deciding set to exit the tournament 4–3. Huybrechts eliminated Ross Smith 9–5 at the UK Open, before losing by a reverse of this scoreline against James Wade in the fourth round. Kim and Ronny comfortably progressed to the quarter-finals of the World Cup of Darts where they faced the Dutch number two seeds Michael van Gerwen and Raymond van Barneveld. Kim produced a superb display to defeat Van Gerwen 4–2 with an average of 106.76, which included a crucial 160 finish in the fifth leg to break the Ducthman's throw when he was waiting on 36. However, Ronny then lost 4–2 to Van Barneveld meaning the tie went into a deciding doubles match which the brothers lost 4–0. Huybrechts' first final in almost a year came at the 17th Players Championship by seeing off Van Gerwen 6–3 and, although he led Wade 5–3, he was beaten 6–5.

After early exits at the World Grand Prix, European Championship and the Masters, Huybrechts qualified from his group in the Grand Slam with a 5–1 win over Darren Webster. He then beat BDO player Alan Norris 10–5 and was involved in the game of his career to date against Van Gerwen in the quarter-finals. Huybrechts started exceptionally to lead 12–3 with an average over 110, before Van Gerwen cut the gap to 13–7. Huybrechts responded with his first televised nine-dart finish and defeated the reigning world champion 16–10. His semi-final match against Dave Chisnall swung in the favour of both players as Huybrechts was 4–1 behind, before edging 14–12 ahead but ultimately lost four of the last five legs to succumb to a 16–15 defeat.

=== 2015 ===
At the 2015 World Championship, Huybrechts gained revenge for his 4–3 loss against Ian White 12 months earlier by beating him by a reversal of this scoreline, winning six of the last seven legs. Huybrechts appeared undeterred by the comments as he celebrated almost every important visit to the board and leg winning doubles which saw him lead Taylor on three different occasions. However, he lost the deciding set without taking a leg to be edged out 4–3. Following the World Championship final, Huybrechts was named as a PDC Wildcard to compete in the 2015 Premier League Darts. He was beaten 7–3 by Van Gerwen on the opening night. On the fourth night Huybrechts and Dave Chisnall both averaged 107.01, but Huybrechts was beaten 7–4. A week later he picked up his first win in the event by defeating Raymond van Barneveld 7–5 with an average of 105.59. It proved to be his only win in the event and he was relegated in week nine as he was bottom of the table. In the fifth round of the UK Open, Van Gerwen highest hit his highest televised average until then of 114.91 as he overcame Huybrechts 9–2.

In the quarter-finals of the World Cup, Kim needed to defeat Paul Nicholson to keep Belgium in the tie. He fell 3–0 down, but Nicholson missed a total of six match darts allowing Kim to win 4–3. In the deciding doubles match Ronny took out an 86 finish on the bull to see them reach the semi-finals. There, Ronny lost 4–3 to Taylor and Kim lost 4–2 to Adrian Lewis to oust Belgium from the tournament. Huybrechts' first final of the year came in July at the 13th Players Championship and he lost 6–5 to James Wade after leading 3–1 and 5–3. A week later he reached the final of the European Darts Open, but was defeated 6–2 by Robert Thornton. A third final of the year without success came at the 18th Players Championship when Alan Norris ousted him 6–1. Huybrechts won his first title of 2015 at the European Darts Grand Prix by coming back from 5–2 down against Peter Wright to triumph 6–5, hitting checkouts of 157 and 140 in the process. A 10–9 win over three-time BDO world champion Martin Adams set up a rematch with Van Gerwenin the quarter-finals of the Grand Slam, but Huybrechts was unable to repeat his heroics from 12 months earlier as he was thrashed 16–4.

=== 2016 ===
After taking a 2–1 set advantage over David Pallett in the opening round of the 2016 World Championship, Huybrechts lost six consecutive legs to be beaten 3–2. He was thrashed 9–2 by Michael van Gerwen in the fifth round of the UK Open. Kim and Ronny knocked out Scotland's Gary Anderson and Robert Thornton in the quarter-finals of the World Cup, before losing to the Dutch pairing of Michael van Gerwen and Raymond van Barneveld in the semi-finals. Huybrechts was beaten 10–8 by Gerwyn Price in the first round of the World Matchplay, but reached the final of the International Darts Open where he missed seven championship darts to allow Mensur Suljović to triumph 6–5. A 2–1 win over Ian White and 3–0 whitewash of Stephen Bunting saw Huybrechts reach the quarter-finals of the World Grand Prix for the first time. He took the first set against Anderson without reply, but lost nine of the next twelve legs to be defeated 3–1. Another quarter-final followed at the Players Championship Finals and he was 9–7 up on Peter Wright. He missed double 10 to complete a 128 finish for the match and would be beaten 10–9.

=== 2017 ===
Huybrechts didn't drop a set in reaching the third round of the 2017 World Championship, but fell 3–0 down to Phil Taylor. He punished missed match darts from Taylor to take two sets, but would be defeated 4–2. Huybrechts averaged 110 during a 10–1 thrashing of Ted Evetts in the fourth round of the UK Open and progressed to his first quarter-final in the event with a 10–9 win after Joe Cullen missed one match dart. Huybrechts himself then missed two match darts as Alan Norris knocked him out 10–9. He lost 6–3 in the final of the seventh Players Championship to Daryl Gurney. In the second round of the World Cup, Ronny averaged 115.62, the highest ever by a Belgian player in a televised match, as Belgium saw off Greece. A day later Kim averaged 121.97, the second highest televised average of all-time and the brothers would reach their third semi-final in a row, but were unable to win either of their singles matches against the Welsh team of Gerwyn Price and Mark Webster.

=== 2023 ===
Huybrechts won his opening second-round match of the 2023 World Championship 3–0 against Grant Sampson, setting up a tie against defending champion Peter Wright in the third round. Having lost the first set, Huybrechts took the next four to win 4–1 and eliminate Wright. In the fourth round, he was beaten 4–0 by compatriot Dimitri Van den Bergh. Huybrechts claimed his first PDC title since 2015 at Players Championship 3, defeating Gabriel Clemens 8–1 in the final. At the World Cup of Darts, Huybrechts and Van den Bergh represented Belgium and reached the semi-finals, despite the pair having personal issues with each other. They missed out on the final by losing 8–7 to Gerwyn Price and Jonny Clayton of Wales. Huybrechts reached the third round of the Players Championship Finals—a run that included a 6–1 win over top seed Price—before being defeated 10–8 by Stephen Bunting.

=== 2024–present ===
Huybrechts suffered a whitewash defeat to Richard Veenstra in the second round of the 2024 World Championship, losing all nine legs of the match. He and Van den Bergh reached the semi-finals of the World Cup of Darts for the second successive year, where they were beaten 8–3 by Mensur Suljović and Rowby-John Rodriguez of Austria. Competing at the 2024 Czech Darts Open as a replacement player following the withdrawal of Rob Cross, Huybrechts made a surprise run to the final, where he lost 8–1 to Luke Humphries.

Huybrechts was eliminated in the first round of the 2025 World Championship in a 3–1 loss to Keane Barry.

== Personal life ==
Huybrechts and his wife have two daughters, born in 2014 and 2021. Huybrechts' brother, Ronny, also competes on the PDC circuit and has won the Belgium Masters in 2010 and the Belgium National Championships in 2009, 2010 and 2011. They competed together for Belgium from 2013 until 2017 in the World Cup of Darts, reaching the semi-finals twice (2015, 2016) and the final once (2013).

Huybrechts is a supporter of Belgian football club Royal Antwerp. In May 2024, he was attacked while attending the 2024 Belgian Cup final between Royal Antwerp and Union Saint-Gilloise. He suffered a double fracture in his right collarbone and underwent surgery.

== Career finals ==
=== PDC major finals: 1 (1 runner-up) ===
Outcome	No.	Year	Championship	Opponent in the final	Score (Note: (l) = score in legs, (s) = score in sets, (m) = score in matches.)
Runner-up	1.	2012	Players Championship Finals	Phil Taylor	6–13 (l)

=== PDC team finals: 1 (1 runner-up) ===
Outcome	No.	Year	Championship	Team	Teammate	Opponents in the final	Score
Runner-up	1.	2013	World Cup of Darts	Belgium	Ronny Huybrechts	England – Phil Taylor and Adrian Lewis	1–3 (m)

== World Championship results ==
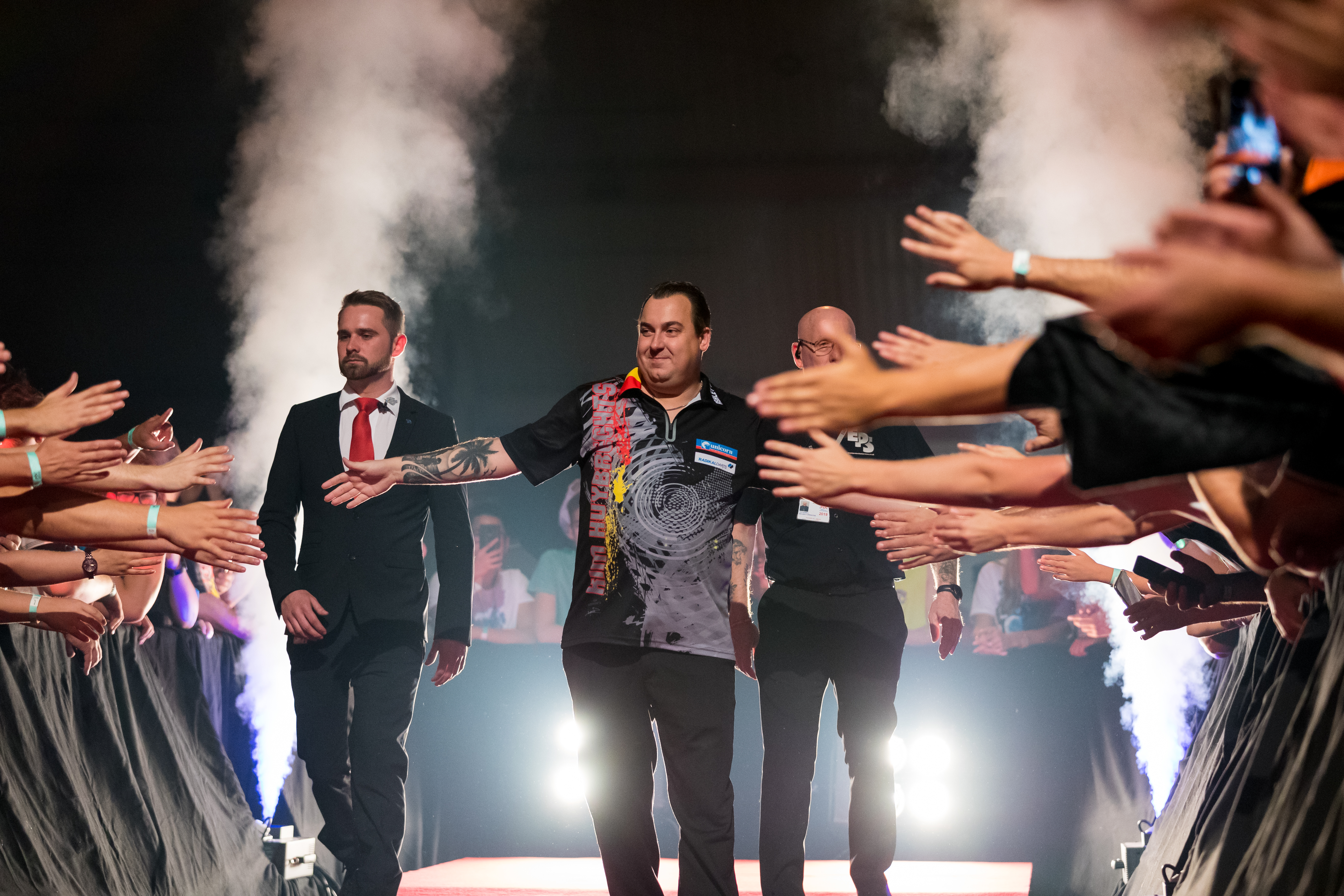
Huybrechts during the 2019 European Darts Matchplay

=== PDC World Championship ===
- 2012: Quarter-finals (lost to Andy Hamilton 2–5)
- 2013: First round (lost to Scott Rand 2–3)
- 2014: Second round (lost to Ian White 3–4)
- 2015: Third round (lost to Phil Taylor 3–4)
- 2016: First round (lost to David Pallett 2–3)
- 2017: Third round (lost to Phil Taylor 2–4)
- 2018: First round (lost to James Richardson 0–3)
- 2019: Third round (lost to Dave Chisnall 0–4)
- 2020: Fourth round (lost to Luke Humphries 1–4)
- 2021: Third round (lost to Ryan Searle 2–4)
- 2022: Third round (lost to Gerwyn Price 3–4)
- 2023: Fourth round (lost to Dimitri Van den Bergh 0–4)
- 2024: Second round (lost to Richard Veenstra 0–3)
- 2025: First round (lost to Keane Barry 1–3)
- 2026: First round (lost to Arno Merk 1–3)

== Career statistics ==
=== Performance timeline ===
Kim Huybrechts' performance timeline is as follows:

=== BDO ===
Tournament	2007	2008	2009	2010
BDO Ranked televised events
World Masters	2R	2R	6R	2R

=== PDC ===
Tournament	2011	2012	2013	2014	2015	2016	2017	2018	2019	2020	2021	2022	2023	2024	2025	2026
PDC Ranked televised events
World Championship	DNQ	QF	1R	2R	3R	1R	3R	1R	3R	4R	3R	3R	4R	2R	1R	1R
World Masters (Note: A non-ranked event until 2025)	Not held		1R	1R	DNQ	QF	1R	1R	Did not qualify						Prel.	Prel.
UK Open	DNQ	5R	4R	4R	5R	5R	QF	5R	5R	5R	4R	4R	5R	4R	4R	3R
World Matchplay	DNQ	1R	1R	1R	1R	1R	1R	2R	DNQ			1R	1R	Did not qualify		
World Grand Prix	DNQ	1R	1R	1R	2R	QF	1R	1R	DNQ	2R	DNQ	1R	Did not qualify			
European Championship	QF	SF	1R	2R	2R	1R	1R	DNQ		1R	1R	Did not qualify				2R
Grand Slam (Note: A non-ranked event until 2015)	DNQ		QF	SF	QF	Did not qualify										
Players Championship Finals	DNQ	F	1R	1R	1R	QF	1R	1R	1R	1R	1R	2R	3R	2R	DNQ	
PDC Non-ranked televised events
Premier League	Did not participate				10th	DNP	10th	Did not participate								
World Cup	NH	QF	F	QF	SF	SF	SF	SF	QF	SF	2R	QF	SF	SF	DNQ	
World Series Finals	Not held				DNQ	2R	Did not qualify				QF	Did not qualify				
Career statistics
Year-end ranking	69	21	12	18	12	13	18	21	41	39	35	31	32	46	60	

==== European Tour ====
Season	1	2	3	4	5	6	7	8	9	10	11	12	13	14	15
2012	ADO; 3R	GDC; QF	EDO; 2R	GDM; 2R	DDM; SF										
2013	UKM; 1R	EDT; QF	EDO; QF	ADO; 1R	GDT; QF	GDC; 1R	GDM; 2R	DDM; W							
2014	GDC; 3R	DDM; 2R	GDM; 3R	ADO; 2R	GDT; QF	EDO; 3R	EDG; 3R	EDT; 3R							
2015	GDC; 2R	GDT; QF	GDM; 2R	DDM; QF	IDO; SF	EDO; F	EDT; 3R	EDM; QF	EDG; W						
2016	DDM; 2R	GDM; 2R	GDT; SF	EDM; 2R	ADO; 3R	EDO; SF	IDO; F	EDT; SF	EDG; SF	GDC; 3R					
2017	GDC; QF	GDM; 3R	GDO; 2R	EDG; 3R	GDT; 2R	EDM; 2R	ADO; 3R	EDO; 2R	DDM; 2R	GDG; 2R	IDO; F	EDT; SF			
2018	EDO; 2R	GDG; 2R	GDO; DNQ	ADO; DNQ	EDG; 2R	DDM; SF	GDT; DNQ	DDO; DNQ	EDM; 3R	GDC; DNQ	DDC; DNQ	IDO; 2R	EDT; 1R		
2019	EDO; 2R	GDC; DNQ	GDG; 3R	GDO; DNQ	ADO; 1R	Did not qualify					EDM; 2R	IDO; DNQ	GDT; 3R		
2020	BDC; 2R	GDC; DNQ	EDG; 2R	IDO; DNQ											
2021	HDT; DNQ	GDT; 2R													
2022	IDO; 3R	GDC; 2R	GDG; 1R	Did not qualify			EDG; 2R	Did not qualify				BDO; 3R	GDT; DNQ		
2023	BSD; DNQ	EDO; DNQ	IDO; 1R	GDG; DNQ	ADO; 1R	DDC; DNQ	BDO; 1R	CDO; 3R	EDG; DNQ	EDM; 1R	Did not qualify				
2024	Did not qualify												CDO; F		
2025	Did not qualify			GDG; 2R	ADO; DNQ	EDG; DNQ	DDC; 1R	EDO; 1R	BSD; 2R	FDT; 2R	CDO; DNQ	HDT; 3R	SDT; DNQ	GDC; DNQ	
2026	PDO; DNQ	EDT; DNQ	BDO; 3R	GDG; 3R	EDG; 2R	ADO; 3R	IDO; 3R	BSD; DNQ	SDO; 2R	EDO; 2R	HDT; DNQ	CDO; 1R	FDT; 1R	SDT; DNQ	DDC; 1R

==== Players Championships ====
Season	1	2	3	4	5	6	7	8	9	10	11	12	13	14	15	16	17	18	19	20	21	22	23	24	25	26	27	28	29	30	31	32	33	34	35	36	37
2010	Did not participate																										NUL; QF	NUL; 2R	DNP			BNA; 2R	BNA; 2R	DNP			
2011	HAL; 4R	HAL; 1R	Did not participate				VIE; SF	VIE; 1R	Did not participate				NUL; 3R	NUL; 3R	Did not participate				NUL; 3R	NUL; 3R	Did not participate			GLA; 3R	GLA; 1R	ALI; 2R	ALI; 2R	CRA; 4R	CRA; QF	WIG; DNP							
2012	ALI; 2R	ALI; QF	REA; QF	REA; SF	CRA; QF	CRA; QF	BIR; 4R	BIR; 1R	CRA; 2R	CRA; SF	BAR; 3R	BAR; 4R	DUB; QF	DUB; QF	KIL; 3R	KIL; 4R	CRA; 3R	CRA; 3R	BAR; QF	BAR; 3R																	
2013	WIG; SF	WIG; 3R	WIG; 4R	WIG; 1R	CRA; 1R	CRA; 4R	BAR; 1R	BAR; 2R	DUB; 3R	DUB; 4R	KIL; 4R	KIL; W	WIG; DNP		BAR; 2R	BAR; 3R																					
2014	BAR; 3R	BAR; SF	CRA; 4R	CRA; 1R	WIG; 3R	WIG; 3R	WIG; QF	WIG; 2R	CRA; DNP		COV; 2R	COV; 3R	CRA; QF	CRA; 4R	DUB; 1R	DUB; QF	CRA; F	CRA; SF	COV; 4R	COV; 1R																	
2015	BAR; 2R	BAR; 1R	BAR; 1R	BAR; 3R	BAR; 1R	COV; 3R	COV; 4R	COV; 3R	CRA; 1R	CRA; 1R	BAR; 2R	BAR; 3R	WIG; F	WIG; 3R	BAR; SF	BAR; QF	DUB; 3R	DUB; F	COV; 1R	COV; 3R																	
2016	BAR; 4R	BAR; 3R	BAR; 3R	BAR; 2R	BAR; 2R	BAR; 1R	BAR; 2R	COV; 2R	COV; 4R	BAR; SF	BAR; SF	BAR; 2R	BAR; 2R	BAR; QF	BAR; 2R	BAR; SF	DUB; 1R	DUB; 1R	BAR; 4R	BAR; 1R																	
2017	BAR; 3R	BAR; 2R	BAR; 2R	BAR; SF	MIL; 2R	MIL; QF	BAR; F	BAR; 1R	WIG; 1R	WIG; 2R	MIL; 2R	MIL; SF	WIG; QF	WIG; 4R	BAR; 3R	BAR; 2R	BAR; 4R	BAR; 3R	DUB; 3R	DUB; 1R	BAR; 2R	BAR; 1R															
2018	BAR; 3R	BAR; 4R	BAR; 1R	BAR; 2R	MIL; 1R	MIL; 3R	BAR; 3R	BAR; 1R	WIG; 1R	WIG; 1R	MIL; 1R	MIL; 3R	WIG; 1R	WIG; 2R	BAR; 1R	BAR; 1R	BAR; QF	BAR; 1R	DUB; 1R	DUB; QF	BAR; 1R	BAR; 3R															
2019	WIG; 1R	WIG; 4R	WIG; 4R	WIG; 1R	BAR; 1R	BAR; 2R	WIG; 2R	WIG; 2R	BAR; 4R	BAR; 1R	BAR; 4R	BAR; 1R	BAR; 1R	BAR; 1R	BAR; 2R	BAR; 3R	WIG; 1R	WIG; 2R	BAR; 2R	BAR; 2R	HIL; 1R	HIL; 1R	BAR; 3R	BAR; 1R	BAR; 2R	BAR; 3R	DUB; 1R	DUB; QF	BAR; 2R	BAR; 2R							
2020	BAR; 1R	BAR; 1R	WIG; 1R	WIG; 3R	WIG; 2R	WIG; 1R	BAR; 2R	BAR; SF	MIL; 2R	MIL; 1R	MIL; 2R	MIL; 2R	MIL; 1R	NIE; 2R	NIE; 3R	NIE; 3R	NIE; 1R	NIE; 2R	COV; 1R	COV; 2R	COV; 1R	COV; 2R	COV; SF														
2021	BOL; 2R	BOL; 2R	BOL; 1R	BOL; 3R	MIL; 1R	MIL; 1R	MIL; 3R	MIL; 2R	NIE; 1R	NIE; 2R	NIE; 3R	NIE; 1R	MIL; 1R	MIL; 3R	MIL; 2R	MIL; 1R	COV; 2R	COV; 2R	COV; 4R	COV; 2R	BAR; 1R	BAR; 3R	BAR; 1R	BAR; SF	BAR; 2R	BAR; 2R	BAR; QF	BAR; 2R	BAR; QF	BAR; 3R							
2022	BAR; 4R	BAR; 2R	WIG; 4R	WIG; 4R	BAR; 2R	BAR; 3R	NIE; 3R	NIE; 3R	BAR; 4R	BAR; 2R	BAR; 3R	BAR; 1R	BAR; 4R	WIG; 4R	WIG; 1R	NIE; 2R	NIE; SF	BAR; 3R	BAR; 2R	BAR; 2R	BAR; 3R	BAR; 3R	BAR; 1R	BAR; 2R	BAR; 4R	BAR; 1R	BAR; 2R	BAR; 3R	BAR; 4R	BAR; 1R							
2023	BAR; 4R	BAR; 1R	BAR; W	BAR; 2R	BAR; 1R	BAR; 1R	HIL; 2R	HIL; 1R	WIG; 3R	WIG; 1R	LEI; 1R	LEI; 3R	HIL; 2R	HIL; 1R	LEI; 1R	LEI; 1R	HIL; 4R	HIL; 3R	BAR; 1R	BAR; 2R	BAR; 2R	BAR; 2R	BAR; 3R	BAR; 4R	BAR; 2R	BAR; 2R	BAR; 2R	BAR; 2R	BAR; 2R	BAR; 2R							
2024	WIG; 4R	WIG; 1R	LEI; 1R	LEI; 1R	HIL; 1R	HIL; 1R	LEI; 4R	LEI; 2R	HIL; 2R	HIL; 1R	HIL; 2R	HIL; 2R	MIL; 3R	MIL; 2R	MIL; 1R	MIL; 4R	MIL; 1R	MIL; 2R	MIL; 2R	WIG; 2R	WIG; 2R	MIL; 2R	MIL; 1R	WIG; 2R	WIG; 3R	WIG; 3R	WIG; 3R	WIG; 2R	LEI; 2R	LEI; 1R							
2025	WIG; 1R	WIG; 4R	ROS; 1R	ROS; 1R	LEI; 3R	LEI; 2R	HIL; 1R	HIL; 1R	LEI; 1R	LEI; 1R	LEI; 1R	LEI; 1R	ROS; 2R	ROS; 1R	HIL; 2R	HIL; 3R	LEI; 1R	LEI; 2R	LEI; 1R	LEI; 3R	LEI; 2R	HIL; 1R	HIL; 3R	MIL; 1R	MIL; 1R	HIL; 3R	HIL; 3R	LEI; 2R	LEI; 1R	LEI; 3R	WIG; 3R	WIG; 1R	WIG; 1R	WIG; 1R			
2026	HIL; 2R	HIL; 1R	WIG; 1R	WIG; 4R	LEI; 1R	LEI; 4R	LEI; 2R	LEI; 3R	WIG; 3R	WIG; 3R	MIL; 1R	MIL; 2R	HIL; 3R	HIL; 1R	LEI; 4R	LEI; 3R	LEI; 3R	LEI; 3R	MIL; 3R	MIL; 1R	WIG; 1R	WIG; 3R	LEI; 4R	LEI; 1R	HIL; 2R	HIL; 1R	LEI; QF	LEI; QF	ROS; 3R	ROS; 1R	ROS; 4R	ROS; 2R	LEI; 2R	LEI			

Performance Table Legend
W	Won the tournament	F	Finalist	SF	Semifinalist	QF	Quarterfinalist	#R; RR; Prel.	Lost in # round Round-robin; Preliminary round	DQ	Disqualified
DNQ	Did not qualify	DNP	Did not participate	WD	Withdrew	NH	Tournament not held	#R; RR; Prel.	Lost in # round Round-robin; Preliminary round	NYF	Not yet founded

== Nine-dart finishes ==
Kim Huybrechts televised nine-dart finishes
Date	Opponent	Tournament	Method	Prize
14 November 2014	(Netherlands) Michael van Gerwen	Grand Slam	3 x T20; 3 x T20; T20, T19, D12	£10,000
