= Kimberly Y. Smith =

American scientific executive and medical doctor

Kimberly Y. Smith is an American scientific executive and medical doctor serving as the head of research and development at ViiV Healthcare.

== Background and career ==
Smith is a graduate of the University of Michigan School of Medicine and holds an MPH degree from the University of Michigan School of Public Health. She completed her internship, residency, and Infectious Disease fellowship at Rush University Medical Center in Chicago. Following her training she served on the faculty of the Section of Infectious Disease at Rush for over a decade and as an Attending Physician at Stroger Hospital & the CORE Center in Chicago. Smith served as Principal Investigator of the Rush University Medical Center Clinical Research Site of the AIDS Clinical Trials Group (ACTG). Smith also served as the chair of the ACTG Underrepresented Populations Committee. After joining ViiV in 2013, Smith worked primarily on global medical strategy until 2019, when she was promote to Head R&D for the company.

Smith serves as a board director for Qura Therapeutics.

== Awards ==
- 2011: POZ "People We Love"
- 2011: Thurgood Marshall College Fund Excellence in Medicine Award
- 2008: Black AIDS Institute "Heroes in the Struggle"
- 2020 National Medical Association Scroll of Merit Award
- Endpoints- 20 of the Top Women in BioPharma Dec 2020
- Fiercepharma – Fiercest Women in Life Sciences-Nov 2020
- The Healthcare Technology Report- The Top 25 Women Leaders in Biotechnology of 2020-Nov 2020

== Publications ==
Smith co-wrote HIV/AIDS in U.S. Communities of Color in 2009. She has over 100 research publications.

== Volunteer service ==
Smith serves on the HIV/AIDS Research Advisory Council of the National Institute of Allergy and Infectious Diseases.
