= Sunne =

Sunne may refer to:

- Sunne, Sweden, a town
- Sunne Municipality, a Swedish municipality with its seat in the town
- Linn T. Sunne (born 1971), Norwegian children's writer
- Sunne, the Old English name for the sun
- Sunne, possible Anglo-Saxon sun goddess related to the Norse Sól

== See also ==
- Sunnee (born 1996), Thai singer
