= Kim Sunna =

Swedish ice hockey player

- Born: June 14, 1987 (age 38) Kiruna, Sweden
- Height: 6 ft 0 in (183 cm)
- Weight: 192 lb (87 kg; 13 st 10 lb)
- Position: Left wing
- Shoots: Right
- Elitserien team: Luleå HF
- NHL draft: Undrafted
- Playing career: 2006–present

Kim Sunna (born June 14, 1987) is a Swedish professional ice hockey player. He currently plays for Luleå HF of the Swedish Elitserien.
