= 2022 Czech Darts Open =

2022 edition of Czech Darts Open

2022 Gambrinus Czech Darts Open

Tournament information
- Dates: 13–15 May 2022
- Venue: Královka Arena
- Location: Prague, Czech Republic
- Organisation(s): Professional Darts Corporation (PDC)
- Format: Legs
- Prize fund: £140,000
- Winner's share: £25,000
- High checkout: 170; Michael Smith; Luke Humphries

Champion(s)
- Luke Humphries (ENG)

The 2022 Gambrinus Czech Darts Open was the sixth of thirteen PDC European Tour events on the 2022 PDC Pro Tour. The tournament took place at the Královka Arena, Prague, Czech Republic, from 13 to 15 May 2022. It featured a field of 48 players and £140,000 in prize money, with £25,000 going to the winner.

Jamie Hughes was the defending champion after defeating Stephen Bunting 8–3 in the 2019 final, but he failed to qualify for this tournament, so was unable to defend his title.

Luke Humphries won his second European Tour title with an 8–5 win over Rob Cross in the final.

== Prize money ==
The prize money is unchanged from the European Tours of the last 3 years:

| Stage (num. of players) | | Prize money |
|---|---|---|
| Winner | (1) | £25,000 |
| Runner-up | (1) | £10,000 |
| Semi-finalists | (2) | £6,500 |
| Quarter-finalists | (4) | £5,000 |
| Third round losers | (8) | £3,000 |
| Second round losers | (16) | £2,000* |
| First round losers | (16) | £1,000* |
| Total | £140,000 | |

- Seeded players who lose in the second round and host nation qualifiers (who qualify automatically as a result of their ranking) who lose in their first match of the event shall not be credited with prize money on any Order of Merit. A player who qualifies as a qualifier, but later becomes a seed due to the withdrawal of one or more other players shall be credited with their prize money on all Orders of Merit regardless of how far they progress in the event.

== Qualification and format ==
The top 16 entrants from the PDC ProTour Order of Merit on 29 March automatically qualified for the event and were seeded in the second round.

The remaining 32 places went to players from six qualifying events – 24 from the Tour Card Holder Qualifier (held on 8 April), two from the Associate Member Qualifier (held on 24 April), the two highest ProTour ranking Czech players, two from the Host Nation Qualifier (held on 12 May), one from the Nordic & Baltic Associate Member Qualifier (held on 19 February), and one from the East European Associate Member Qualifier (held on 23 April).

Fourth seed Peter Wright and Nordic and Baltic qualifier Niels Heinsøe withdrew from the tournament prior to the draw. Martin Schindler was promoted to 16th seed and two extra places were made available in the Host Nation Qualifier.

The following players took part in the tournament:

Top 16

1. Gerwyn Price (second round)
2. Michael van Gerwen (quarter-finals)
3. José de Sousa (semi-finals)
4. Joe Cullen (second round)
5. Rob Cross (runner-up)
6. Michael Smith (second round)
7. Dimitri Van den Bergh (third round)
8. Damon Heta (second round)
9. Ryan Searle (third round)
10. Luke Humphries (champion)
11. Dirk van Duijvenbode (third round)
12. Krzysztof Ratajski (second round)
13. Daryl Gurney (second round)
14. Jonny Clayton (second round)
15. Brendan Dolan (second round)
16. Martin Schindler (second round)

Tour Card Qualifier
- Nathan Aspinall (second round)
- Jonathan Worsley (first round)
- Rowby-John Rodriguez (quarter-finals)
- John Henderson (first round)
- Vincent van der Voort (semi-finals)
- Geert Nentjes (first round)
- Martijn Kleermaker (second round)
- Josh Rock (first round)
- Ted Evetts (first round)
- Dave Chisnall (third round)
- Ricky Evans (third round)
- Mickey Mansell (third round)
- Florian Hempel (first round)
- Ross Smith (quarter-finals)
- José Justicia (third round)
- Jeffrey de Zwaan (first round)
- Martin Lukeman (second round)
- Adrian Lewis (third round)
- Brett Claydon (first round)
- Scott Waites (first round)
- Ritchie Edhouse (second round)
- Gabriel Clemens (first round)
- Jules van Dongen (second round)

Associate Member Qualifier
- Martijn Dragt (first round)
- Dennie Olde Kalter (first round)

Highest Ranked Czechs
- Adam Gawlas (quarter-finals)
- Karel Sedláček (second round)

Host Nation Qualifier
- Ondřej Plšek (first round)
- Miloslav Navrátil (first round)
- Vítězslav Sedlák (second round)
- Filip Šebesta (first round)

East European Qualifier
- Sebastian Białecki (first round)

== Draw ==
First round (best of 11 legs); 13 May
Ted Evetts 90.94 | 3
Adrian Lewis 93.33 | 6
Vincent van der Voort 88.75 | 6
Geert Nentjes 81.11 | 2
Dennie Olde Kalter 85.32 | 4
Adam Gawlas 86.00 | 6
Ritchie Edhouse 92.18 | 6
Ondřej Plšek 66.81 | 1
Florian Hempel 85.30 | 4
Ross Smith 90.72 | 6
Dave Chisnall 94.93 | 6
Filip Šebesta 76.67 | 0
Jules van Dongen 83.96 | 6
Brett Claydon 75.53 | 2
Ricky Evans 95.03 | 6
Josh Rock 96.02 | 4
Jonathan Worsley 86.82 | 4
Vítězslav Sedlák 82.08 | 6
Mickey Mansell 97.02 | 6
Jeffrey de Zwaan 88.51 | 4
John Henderson 90.70 | 1
Nathan Aspinall 95.21 | 6
Martijn Dragt 81.31 | 1
Martin Lukeman 98.07 | 6
Martijn Kleermaker 90.59 | 6
Sebastian Białecki 89.78 | 4
José Justicia 79.20 | 6
Miloslav Navrátil 70.60 | 2
Scott Waites 91.11 | 2
Rowby-John Rodriguez 99.21 | 6
Gabriel Clemens 89.33 | 3
Karel Sedláček 90.81 | 6

Second round (best of 11 legs); 14 May
1 | Gerwyn Price 91.78 | 3
Adrian Lewis 91.65 | 6
16 | Martin Schindler 98.16 | 5
Vincent van der Voort 99.45 | 6
8 | Damon Heta 90.25 | 4
Adam Gawlas 88.20 | 6
9 | Ryan Searle 107.36 | 6
Ritchie Edhouse 80.00 | 0
4 | Joe Cullen 94.14 | 4
Ross Smith 97.84 | 6
13 | Daryl Gurney 103.83 | 5
Dave Chisnall 102.92 | 6
5 | Rob Cross 99.87 | 6
Jules van Dongen 91.09 | 2
12 | Krzysztof Ratajski 98.59 | 0
Ricky Evans 103.66 | 6
2 | Michael van Gerwen 85.90 | 6
Vítězslav Sedlák 76.57 | 2
15 | Brendan Dolan 91.53 | 5
Mickey Mansell 88.98 | 6
7 | Dimitri Van den Bergh 96.06 | 6
Nathan Aspinall 95.68 | 4
10 | Luke Humphries 95.04 | 6
Martin Lukeman 87.46 | 1
3 | José de Sousa 93.70 | 6
Martijn Kleermaker 88.71 | 2
14 | Jonny Clayton 100.40 | 5
José Justicia 98.01 | 6
6 | Michael Smith 91.56 | 4
Rowby-John Rodriguez 94.47 | 6
11 | Dirk van Duijvenbode 95.91 | 6
Karel Sedláček 90.16 | 3

Third round (best of 11 legs); 15 May
Lewis 84.59 | 3
van der Voort 88.53 | 6
Gawlas 93.24 | 6
9 | Searle 86.77 | 5
R. Smith 91.73 | 6
Chisnall 93.27 | 4
5 | Cross 90.32 | 6
Evans 84.73 | 2
2 | van Gerwen 108.52 | 6
Mansell 90.84 | 5
7 | Van den Bergh 90.98 | 4
10 | Humphries 90.96 | 6
3 | de Sousa 98.83 | 6
Justicia 92.47 | 5
Rodriguez 93.86 | 6
11 | van Duijvenbode 95.06 | 5

Quarter-finals (best of 11 legs); 15 May
van der Voort 90.11 | 6
Gawlas 86.43 | 2
Smith 92.71 | 4
5 | Cross 92.21 | 6
2 | van Gerwen 95.65 | 4
10 | Humphries 98.65 | 6
3 | de Sousa 101.32 | 6
Rodriguez 96.60 | 2

Semi-finals (best of 13 legs); 15 May
van der Voort 95.70 | 4
5 | Cross 96.80 | 7
10 | Humphries 99.16 | 7
3 | Sousa 99.30 | 4

Final (best of 15 legs); 15 May
5 | Cross 94.41 | 5
10 | Humphries 100.34 | 8
