= 2022 Hungarian Darts Trophy =

2022 edition of Hungarian Darts Trophy

Tournament information
- Dates: 2–4 September 2022
- Venue: BOK Sportcsarnok
- Location: Budapest, Hungary
- Organisation(s): Professional Darts Corporation (PDC)
- Format: Legs
- Prize fund: £140,000
- Winner's share: £25,000
- High checkout: 170 Dave Chisnall

Champion(s)
- Joe Cullen (ENG)

The 2022 Hungarian Darts Trophy was the tenth of thirteen PDC European Tour events on the 2022 PDC Pro Tour. The tournament took place at the BOK Sportcsarnok, Budapest, Hungary, from 2 to 4 September 2022. It featured a field of 48 players and £140,000 in prize money, with £25,000 going to the winner.

Gerwyn Price was the defending champion after defeating Michael Smith 8–2 in the 2021 final. However, he withdrew from the tournament before it started.

Joe Cullen won his third European tour title, defeating William O'Connor 8–2 in the final.

The tournament equalled the European tour record for the most seeded players losing their first match as 11 of 16 players including Michael van Gerwen and Peter Wright lost in the second round. The previous event which involved 11 seeds being eliminated was the 2019 Czech Darts Open.

== Prize money ==
The prize money was unchanged from the European Tours of the last 3 years:

Stage (num. of players)		Prize money
Winner	(1)	£25,000
Runner-up	(1)	£10,000
Semi-finalists	(2)	£6,500
Quarter-finalists	(4)	£5,000
Third round losers	(8)	£3,000
Second round losers	(16)	£2,000*
First round losers	(16)	£1,000*
Total	£140,000	

- Seeded players who lose in the second round and host nation qualifiers (who qualify automatically as a result of their ranking) who lose in their first match of the event shall not be credited with prize money on any Order of Merit. A player who qualifies as a qualifier, but later becomes a seed due to the withdrawal of one or more other players shall be credited with their prize money on all Orders of Merit regardless of how far they progress in the event.

== Qualification and format ==
The top 16 entrants from the PDC ProTour Order of Merit on 28 June automatically qualified for the event and were seeded in the second round.

The remaining 32 places went to players from six qualifying events – 24 from the Tour Card Holder Qualifier (held on 7 July), two from the Associate Member Qualifier (held on 24 April), as there was only one Hungarian on the Order of Merit, three Hungarians would qualify from the Host Nation Qualifier (held on 10 July), one from the Nordic & Baltic Associate Member Qualifier (held on 3 June), and one from the East European Associate Member Qualifier (held on 25 June).

Gerwyn Price withdrew from the tournament after the draw was made, so Madars Razma received a bye to the third round. Rowby-John Rodriguez withdrew for family reasons, meaning Raymond van Barneveld received a bye to the second round.

The following players took part in the tournament:

Top 16

1. Michael van Gerwen (second round)
2. Luke Humphries (second round)
3. ~~Gerwyn Price (withdrew)~~
4. Michael Smith (third round)
5. Rob Cross (second round)
6. Peter Wright (second round)
7. Damon Heta (second round)
8. Ryan Searle (second round)
9. Nathan Aspinall (semi-finals)
10. Dirk van Duijvenbode (third round)
11. Joe Cullen (champion)
12. José de Sousa (quarter-finals)
13. Dimitri Van den Bergh (second round)
14. Danny Noppert (second round)
15. Jonny Clayton (second round)
16. Krzysztof Ratajski (second round)

Tour Card Qualifier
- Nathan Rafferty (first round)
- Jeff Smith (first round)
- Dave Chisnall (semi-finals)
- Josh Rock (quarter-finals)
- Callan Rydz (first round)
- Ryan Meikle (quarter-finals)
- Daryl Gurney (second round)
- ~~Rowby-John Rodriguez (withdrew)~~
- Stephen Bunting (second round)
- Boris Krčmar (third round)
- Martin Lukeman (Second round)
- William O'Connor (runner-up)
- Darius Labanauskas (first round)
- Simon Whitlock (third round)
- Ted Evetts (first round)
- Raymond van Barneveld (second round)
- Chris Dobey (second round)
- Jeffrey de Zwaan (third round)
- Madars Razma (third round)
- Rusty-Jake Rodriguez (quarter-finals)
- Gabriel Clemens (first round)
- Jim Williams (third round)
- Ian White (first round)
- Brett Claydon (first round)

Associate Member Qualifier
- Thibault Tricole (first round)
- Franz Rötzsch (first round)

Highest Ranked Hungarian
- János Végső (first round)

Host Nation Qualifier
- Levente Sárai (first round)
- András Borbély (first round)
- Pál Székely (first round)

Nordic & Baltic Qualifier
- Daniel Larsson (first round)

East European Qualifier
- Karel Sedláček (third round)

== Draw ==
First round (best of 11 legs); 2 September
Simon Whitlock 95.23	6
János Végső 80.53	2
Gabriel Clemens 93.96	4
Ryan Meikle 91.15	6
Thibault Tricole 82.78	4
Karel Sedláček 82.78	6
Stephen Bunting 103.66	6
Callan Rydz 90.14	0
Daryl Gurney 105.30	6
Nathan Rafferty 93.03	1
Pál Székely 77.21	2
William O'Connor 83.76	6
András Borbély 79.57	2
Jeffrey de Zwaan 84.88	6
Raymond van Barneveld	w/o
Rowby-John Rodriguez	w/d
Boris Krčmar 90.05	6
Levente Sárai 74.68	1
Dave Chisnall 97.77	6
Daniel Larsson 84.82	1
Darius Labanauskas 90.42	4
Josh Rock 93.68	6
Ted Evetts 84.41	3
Chris Dobey 94.97	6
Franz Rötzsch 91.51	5
Madars Razma 93.51	6
Jeff Smith 88.52	2
Rusty-Jake Rodriguez 91.24	6
Brett Claydon 85.67	5
Jim Williams 84.53	6
Ian White 86.04	4
Martin Lukeman 92.14	6

Second round (best of 11 legs); 3 September
1	Michael van Gerwen 89.13	5
Simon Whitlock 88.98	6
16	Krzysztof Ratajski 80.93	4
Ryan Meikle 85.10	6
8	Ryan Searle 89.70	3
Karel Sedláček 96.81	6
9	Nathan Aspinall 88.62	6
Stephen Bunting 91.39	3
4	Michael Smith 92.02	6
Daryl Gurney 86.84	0
13	Dimitri Van den Bergh 80.70	3
William O'Connor 94.28	6
5	Rob Cross 91.78	4
Jeffrey de Zwaan 92.96	6
12	José de Sousa 99.55	6
Raymond van Barneveld 90.95	5
2	Luke Humphries 92.69	3
Boris Krčmar 96.90	6
15	Jonny Clayton 90.75	5
Dave Chisnall 91.04	6
7	Damon Heta 98.50	4
Josh Rock 103.58	6
10	Dirk van Duijvenbode 104.13	6
Chris Dobey 100.70	3
3	Gerwyn Price	w/d
Madars Razma	w/o
14	Danny Noppert 91.93	1
Rusty-Jake Rodriguez 99.03	6
6	Peter Wright 100.35	5
Jim Williams 98.75	6
11	Joe Cullen 90.75	6
Martin Lukeman 91.08	4

Third round (best of 11 legs); 4 September
Whitlock 90.99	5
Meikle 89.98	6
Sedláček 90.73	4
9	Aspinall 97.80	6
4	M. Smith 96.80	5
O'Connor 98.80	6
de Zwaan 84.49	4
12	de Sousa 88.46	6
Krčmar 88.51	3
Chisnall 92.68	6
Rock 99.89	6
10	van Duijvenbode 93.41	5
Razma 91.88	4
Ru Rodriguez 90.65	6
Williams 85.67	4
11	Cullen 90.10	6

Quarter-finals (best of 11 legs); 4 September
Meikle 97.85	5
9	Aspinall 99.10	6
O'Connor 95.14	6
12	de Sousa 93.49	4
Chisnall 102.48	6
Rock 87.07	0
Ru Rodriguez 81.91	4
11	Cullen 84.27	6

Semi-finals (best of 13 legs); 4 September
9	Aspinall 79.55	5
O'Connor 87.22	7
Chisnall 103.63	6
11	Cullen 98.55	7

Final (best of 15 legs); 4 September
O'Connor 89.15	2
11	Cullen 97.59	8
