= 2024 Czech Darts Open =

2024 Gambrinus Czech Darts Open

Tournament information
- Dates: 18–20 October 2024
- Venue: PVA EXPO
- Location: Prague, Czech Republic
- Organisation(s): Professional Darts Corporation (PDC)
- Format: Legs
- Prize fund: £175,000
- Winner's share: £30,000
- High checkout: 170; Patrik Kovács; Luke Humphries

Champion(s)
- Luke Humphries

The 2024 Czech Darts Open (known for sponsorship reasons as the 2024 Gambrinus Czech Darts Open) was the final event of the PDC European Tour on the 2024 PDC Pro Tour. The tournament took place at the PVA EXPO Praha, in Prague, Czech Republic, from 18 to 20 October 2024. It featured a field of 48 players and £175,000 in prize money, with £30,000 going to the winner.

Peter Wright was the defending champion after defeating Dave Chisnall 8–6 in the 2023 final. He was eliminated in the second round, losing 6–1 to Martin Schindler.

Luke Humphries won his second European Tour title of the year with an 8–1 win over Kim Huybrechts in the final.

== Prize money ==
The prize fund remained at £175,000, with £30,000 to the winner:

| Stage (num. of players) | | Prize money |
|---|---|---|
| Winner | (1) | £30,000 |
| Runner-up | (1) | £12,000 |
| Semi-finalists | (2) | £8,500 |
| Quarter-finalists | (4) | £6,000 |
| Third round losers | (8) | £4,000 |
| Second round losers | (16) | £2,500* |
| First round losers | (16) | £1,250* |
| Total | £175,000 | |

- Pre-qualified players from the Orders of Merit who lose in their first match of the event shall not be credited with prize money on any Order of Merit. A player who qualifies as a qualifier, but later becomes a seed due to the withdrawal of one or more other players shall be credited with their prize money on all Orders of Merit regardless of how far they progress in the event.

== Qualification and format ==
A massive overhaul in the qualification for the 2024 European Tour events was announced on 7 January.

For the first time, both the PDC Order of Merit and the PDC Pro Tour Order of Merit rankings were used to determine 32 of the 48 entrants for the event.

The top 16 on the PDC Order of Merit qualified, along with the highest 16 ranked players on the PDC ProTour Order of Merit (after the PDC Order of Merit players were removed). From those 32 players, the 16 highest ranked players on the PDC ProTour Order of Merit were seeded for the event.

The seedings were confirmed on 17 August.

The remaining 16 places went to players from four qualifying events – 10 from the Tour Card Holder Qualifier (held on 23 August), four from the Host Nation Qualifier (held on 17 October), one from the Nordic & Baltic Associate Member Qualifier (held on 27 July), and one from the East European Associate Member Qualifier (held on 2 June).

Gary Anderson and Ryan Joyce withdrew prior to the tournament start and were replaced by Madars Razma and Florian Hempel. Ricardo Pietreczko moved up to become a seed. Rob Cross withdrew due to illness after the draw was made, with Kim Huybrechts being a direct replacement in the draw. Gerwyn Price withdrew due to a trapped nerve in his neck after the draw was made, with Maik Kuivenhoven being a direct replacement in the draw.

The following players are taking part in the tournament:

Seeded Players

1. Dave Chisnall (second round)
2. Ross Smith (second round)
3. Luke Humphries (champion)
4. Josh Rock (second round)
5. ~~Gerwyn Price~~ (withdrew)
6. Danny Noppert (second round)
7. Damon Heta (third round)
8. Stephen Bunting (second round)
9. Ryan Searle (second round)
10. Luke Littler (semi-finals)
11. Martin Schindler (third round)
12. Chris Dobey (second round)
13. ~~Rob Cross~~ (withdrew)
14. Gian van Veen (third round)
15. Michael van Gerwen (quarter-finals)
16. Ricardo Pietreczko (third round)

Order of Merit Qualifiers
- Daryl Gurney (first round)
- Jonny Clayton (quarter-finals)
- Michael Smith (third round)
- Raymond van Barneveld (third round)
- Peter Wright (second round)
- Krzysztof Ratajski (second round)
- Mike De Decker (quarter-finals)
- Ritchie Edhouse (second round)
- Brendan Dolan (first round)
- Joe Cullen (first round)
- Luke Woodhouse (second round)
- Cameron Menzies (first round)
- Dimitri Van den Bergh (first round)
- Nathan Aspinall (second round)

Tour Card Qualifier
- James Wade (second round)
- Martin Lukeman (second round)
- Callan Rydz (first round)
- Kevin Doets (first round)
- Gabriel Clemens (second round)
- Robert Owen (first round)
- Jermaine Wattimena (quarter-finals)
- Alan Soutar (third round)
- Brett Claydon (first round)
- Niels Zonneveld (semi-finals)

Host Nation Qualifier
- Daniel Markovský (first round)
- Jiří Brejcha (first round)
- Pavel Drtil (third round)
- Michal Šmejda (first round)

Nordic & Baltic Qualifier
- Marko Kantele (first round)

East European Qualifier
- Patrik Kovács (first round)

Reserve List
- Madars Razma (first round)
- Florian Hempel (first round)
- Kim Huybrechts (runner-up)
- Maik Kuivenhoven (second round)

== Draw ==
First round (best of 11 legs); 18 October
Robert Owen 88.62 | 2
Niels Zonneveld 92.60 | 6
Martin Lukeman 86.21 | 6
Callan Rydz 87.18 | 4
Dimitri Van den Bergh 84.21 | 2
Jonny Clayton 96.59 | 6
Kevin Doets 81.68 | 3
Michael Smith 86.79 | 6
Joe Cullen 82.49 | 4
Pavel Drtil 84.27 | 6
Luke Woodhouse 92.02 | 6
Marko Kantele 80.74 | 0
Daryl Gurney 84.63 | 0
Raymond van Barneveld 98.02 | 6
Jermaine Wattimena 91.14 | 6
Patrik Kovács 81.90 | 5
Alt | Florian Hempel 81.02 | 2
Alan Soutar 88.07 | 6
Krzysztof Ratajski 91.73 | 6
Alt | Madars Razma 80.08 | 3
Brendan Dolan 81.30 | 1
Gabriel Clemens 87.23 | 6
Michal Šmejda 73.02 | 1
Nathan Aspinall 88.65 | 6
Ritchie Edhouse 97.21 | 6
Jiří Brejcha 89.87 | 2
James Wade 105.67 | 6
Daniel Markovský 80.20 | 1
Mike De Decker 104.01 | 6
Brett Claydon 81.47 | 1
Cameron Menzies 97.19 | 5
Peter Wright 97.32 | 6

Second round (best of 11 legs); 19 October
1 | Dave Chisnall 85.73 | 2
Niels Zonneveld 93.48 | 6
16 | Ricardo Pietreczko 94.60 | 6
Martin Lukeman 90.47 | 5
8 | Stephen Bunting 85.90 | 3
Jonny Clayton 100.19 | 6
9 | Ryan Searle 91.82 | 3
Michael Smith 107.90 | 6
4 | Josh Rock 91.72 | 5
Pavel Drtil 83.35 | 6
Alt | Kim Huybrechts 93.69 | 6
Luke Woodhouse 92.59 | 5
Alt | Maik Kuivenhoven 90.70 | 4
Raymond van Barneveld 94.37 | 6
12 | Chris Dobey 100.15 | 0
Jermaine Wattimena 107.36 | 6
2 | Ross Smith 93.57 | 5
Alan Soutar 92.36 | 6
15 | Michael van Gerwen 104.56 | 6
Krzysztof Ratajski 98.36 | 4
7 | Damon Heta 102.35 | 6
Gabriel Clemens 93.02 | 3
10 | Luke Littler 110.43 | 6
Nathan Aspinall 96.45 | 1
3 | Luke Humphries 100.68 | 6
Ritchie Edhouse 89.74 | 2
14 | Gian van Veen 97.40 | 6
James Wade 93.18 | 2
6 | Danny Noppert 91.59 | 0
Mike De Decker 102.48 | 6
11 | Martin Schindler 102.94 | 6
Peter Wright 94.45 | 1

Third round (best of 11 legs); 20 October
Zonneveld 91.35 | 6
16 | Pietreczko 95.58 | 5
Clayton 100.37 | 6
Smith 96.18 | 2
Drtil 90.29 | 4
Alt | Huybrechts 93.48 | 6
van Barneveld 89.57 | 4
Wattimena 86.56 | 6
Soutar 90.43 | 2
15 | van Gerwen 95.76 | 6
7 | Heta 105.59 | 3
10 | Littler 116.51 | 6
3 | Humphries 106.81 | 6
14 | van Veen 99.03 | 2
De Decker 104.60 | 6
11 | Schindler 99.86 | 2

Quarter-finals (best of 11 legs); 20 October
Zonneveld 85.32 | 6
Clayton 84.73 | 4
Alt | Huybrechts 92.42 | 6
Wattimena 87.58 | 4
15 | van Gerwen 112.19 | 1
10 | Littler 110.57 | 6
3 | Humphries 103.16 | 6
De Decker 91.14 | 2

Semi-finals (best of 13 legs); 20 October
Zonneveld 93.96 | 6
Alt | Huybrechts 88.14 | 7
10 | Littler 106.73 | 4
3 | Humphries 108.56 | 7

Final (best of 15 legs); 20 October
Alt | Huybrechts 86.14 | 1
3 | Humphries 105.57 | 8

== Top averages ==
The table lists all players who achieved an average of at least 100 in a match. In the case one player has multiple records, this is indicated by the number in brackets.

| # | Player | Round | Average | Result |
|---|---|---|---|---|
| 1 | Luke Littler | 3 | 116.51 | Won |
| 2 | Michael van Gerwen | Quarter Final | 112.19 | Lost |
| 3 | Luke Littler (2) | Quarter Final | 110.57 | Won |
| 4 | Luke Littler (3) | 2 | 110.43 | Won |
| 5 | Luke Humphries | Semi Final | 108.56 | Won |
| 6 | Michael Smith | 2 | 107.90 | Won |
| 7 | Jermaine Wattimena | 2 | 107.36 | Won |
| 8 | Luke Humphries (2) | 3 | 106.81 | Won |
| 9 | Luke Littler (4) | Semi Final | 106.73 | Lost |
| 10 | James Wade | 1 | 105.67 | Won |
| 11 | Damon Heta | 3 | 105.59 | Lost |
| 12 | Luke Humphries (3) | Final | 105.57 | Won |
| 13 | Mike De Decker | 3 | 104.60 | Won |
| 14 | Michael van Gerwen (2) | 2 | 104.56 | Won |
| 15 | Luke Humphries (4) | Quarter Final | 103.16 | Won |
| 16 | Martin Schindler | 2 | 102.94 | Won |
| 17 | Mike De Decker (2) | 2 | 102.48 | Won |
| 18 | Damon Heta (2) | 2 | 102.35 | Won |
| 19 | Luke Humphries (5) | 2 | 100.68 | Won |
| 20 | Jonny Clayton | 3 | 100.37 | Won |
| 21 | Jonny Clayton (2) | 2 | 100.19 | Won |
| 22 | Chris Dobey | 2 | 100.15 | Lost |
