= Pavel Drtil =

Czech darts player (born 1973)

Personal information
- Born: 18 February 1973 (age 53) Trutnov, Czechoslovakia
- Home town: Trutnov, Czech Republic

Sport
- Sport: Darts
- Playing since: 2006
- Laterality: Right-handed

Organisation (see split in darts)
- BDO: 2006–2014
- PDC: 2015–2020, 2024
- WDF: 2006–2014, 2024

WDF major events – best performances
- World Masters: Last 64: 2012
Medal record
Men's Darts
Representing Czech Republic
WDF Europe Cup
| Silver medal – second place | 2024 Šamorín | Men's team |
| Bronze medal – third place | 2024 Šamorín | Men's pairs |
EDU European Ch'ship
| Gold medal – first place | 2007 Prague | Men's triples |
| Gold medal – first place | 2010 Leukerbad | Men's cricket |
| Gold medal – first place | 2018 Caorle | Men's singles |
| Bronze medal – third place | 2016 Poreč | Men's cricket |

Pavel Drtil (born 18 February 1973) is a Czech amateur soft-tip and steel-tip darts player who played in World Darts Federation (WDF), Professional Darts Corporation (PDC) and soft-tip international events. He is a two-time gold medalist in singles competitions at the EDU European Darts Championship and won a bronze medal at the WDF Europe Cup. He also represented the Czech Republic at the PDC World Cup of Darts and WDF World Cup.

== Career ==
Since 2006, Drtil has participated four times in the Winmau World Masters. The best result was recorded in 2012, when he advanced to the third round. He recorded his first significant success during the EDU European Darts Championship in 2010, when he won a gold medal in single cricket competition. On his way to the final, he defeated Boris Krčmar and in the final match he beat Kurt van de Rijck.

In 2010, he was invited to participate in the 2010 PDC World Cup of Darts as a Czech Republic representative together with Martin Kapucian. Unfortunately, due to unfavorable weather conditions in Prague, they were unable to get to the tournament in England. He got another chance to play in the Professional Darts Corporation tournament during 2016 PDC World Cup of Darts. This time he represented his country together with Michal Kočík. They ended their participation in the first round, lost to Yuanjun Liu and Wenge Xie from China, by 3–5 in legs. In 2016, he won another medal at the EDU European Darts Championship in cricket singles competition. In 2018, he won the gold medal in the singles competition, defeated El Abbas El Amri in the final match.

In the following years, he took part in the qualifiers for the PDC European Tour tournaments several times, but without success. Until the 2024 Czech Darts Open, the last European tour on the calendar, he qualified through the Czech Home nation qualifier, once he qualified he beat Joe Cullen in round 1, 6–4, with an average of 84, round 2 he faced Josh Rock, which he won, 6–5, with an Average of 83. In round 3 he faced Kim Huybrechts and the score finished 4–6.

== Performance timeline ==
=== BDO ===
| Tournament | 2006 | 2008 | 2010 | 2012 |
|---|---|---|---|---|
BDO Ranked televised events
| World Masters | PR | 2R | 1R | 3R |

=== PDC ===
| Tournament | 2010 | 2016 |
|---|---|---|
PDC Non-ranked televised events
| World Cup of Darts | 1R | 1R |

==== European Tour ====
| Tournament | 2024 |
|---|---|
| Czech Open | 3R |
