= 2017 European Darts Trophy =

Tournament information
- Dates: 13–15 October 2017
- Venue: Lokhalle
- Location: Göttingen, Germany
- Organisation(s): Professional Darts Corporation (PDC)
- Format: Legs; First to 6 legs
- Prize fund: £135,000
- Winner's share: £25,000
- High checkout: 170 James Richardson

Champion(s)
- Michael van Gerwen (NED)

The 2017 European Darts Trophy was the twelfth of twelve PDC European Tour events on the 2017 PDC Pro Tour. The tournament took place at Lokhalle, Göttingen, Germany, from 13 to 15 October 2017. It featured a field of 48 players and £135,000 in prize money, with £25,000 going to the winner.

Michael van Gerwen was the defending champion after defeating Mensur Suljović 6–5 in the final of the 2016 tournament, and he retained his title by defeating Rob Cross 6–4 in the final.

== Prize money ==
This is how the prize money is divided:

Stage (num. of players)		Prize money
Winner	(1)	£25,000
Runner-up	(1)	£10,000
Semi-finalists	(2)	£6,000
Quarter-finalists	(4)	£4,000
Third round losers	(8)	£3,000
Second round losers	(16)	£2,000
First round losers	(16)	£1,000
Total	£135,000	

== Qualification and format ==
The top 16 entrants from the PDC Pro Tour Order of Merit on 21 September automatically qualified for the event and were seeded in the second round.

The remaining 32 places went to players from five qualifying events - 18 from the UK Qualifier (held in Dublin on 28 September), eight from the West/South European Qualifier (held on 21 September), four from the Host Nation qualifier (held on 12 October), one from the Nordic & Baltic Qualifier (held on 12 August) and one from the East European Qualifier (held on 27 August).

Mensur Suljović withdrew prior to the start of the tournament for family reasons. As he was a seeded player, all seeds from 7–16 moved up one place, with the highest-ranked qualifier, Stephen Bunting, being assigned as the 16th seed. An extra Host Nation qualifier was made available as a result.

The following players took part in the tournament:

Top 16
1. (Netherlands) Michael van Gerwen (winner)
2. (Scotland) Peter Wright (third round)
3. (England) Michael Smith (quarter-finals)
4. (Australia) Simon Whitlock (semi-finals)
5. (Northern Ireland) Daryl Gurney (second round)
6. (England) Rob Cross (runner-up)
7. (England) Dave Chisnall (quarter-finals)
8. (England) Alan Norris (third round)
9. (England) Joe Cullen (quarter-finals)
10. (Netherlands) Jelle Klaasen (third round)
11. (Netherlands) Benito van de Pas (second round)
12. (England) Ian White (second round)
13. (England) Mervyn King (second round)
14. (Wales) Gerwyn Price (second round)
15. (Belgium) Kim Huybrechts (semi-finals)
16. (England) Stephen Bunting (third round)

UK qualifier
- (England) Andy Boulton (quarter-finals)
- (England) Keegan Brown (third round)
- (England) Mick Todd (first round)
- (Wales) Jonathan Worsley (first round)
- (England) James Wade (first round)
- (England) Chris Quantock (first round)
- (England) Steve West (second round)
- (England) Jamie Caven (second round)
- (Scotland) Robert Thornton (first round)
- (England) Ricky Evans (first round)
- (England) Chris Dobey (second round)
- (England) James Wilson (second round)
- (Wales) Jonny Clayton (third round)
- (England) John Bowles (first round)
- (England) Kevin Painter (first round)
- (England) James Richardson (second round)
- (England) Nathan Aspinall (second round)

West/South European qualifier
- (Netherlands) Christian Kist (first round)
- (Austria) Zoran Lerchbacher (second round)
- (Netherlands) Jermaine Wattimena (second round)
- (Netherlands) Vincent van der Voort (third round)
- (Belgium) Dimitri Van den Bergh (first round)
- (Netherlands) Jan Dekker (third round)
- (Netherlands) Yordi Meeuwisse (first round)
- (Netherlands) Jeffrey de Zwaan (first round)

Host Nation qualifier
- (Germany) René Eidams (second round)
- (Germany) Martin Schindler (second round)
- (Germany) Robert Allenstein (first round)
- (Germany) Nico Blum (first round)
- (Germany) Manfred Bilderl (first round)

Nordic & Baltic qualifier
- (Latvia) Madars Razma (first round)

East European qualifier
- (Poland) Krzysztof Ratajski (second round)

== Draw ==
First round (best of 11 legs); 13 October
(England) Ricky Evans 88.57	3
(Austria) Zoran Lerchbacher 100.27	6
(Netherlands) Jeffrey de Zwaan 84.56	5
(Germany) René Eidams 83.21	6
(England) James Richardson 93.47	6
(Belgium) Dimitri Van den Bergh 93.51	3
(England) Chris Quantock 85.18	1
(England) Steve West 88.84	6
(England) Kevin Painter 91.62	5
(England) Andy Boulton 88.47	6
(Netherlands) Vincent van der Voort 89.67	6
(Germany) Nico Blum 90.34	3
(Poland) Krzysztof Ratajski 98.88	6
(Scotland) Robert Thornton 90.76	4
(Netherlands) Jan Dekker 99.10	6
(Netherlands) Christian Kist 66.93	0
(Germany) Martin Schindler 102.53	6
(England) John Bowles 91.18	3
(England) Nathan Aspinall 92.18	6
(England) James Wade 83.19	1
(Latvia) Madars Razma 89.08	4
(England) James Wilson 89.83	6
(England) Chris Dobey 85.27	6
(Germany) Robert Allenstein 86.83	4
(Netherlands) Yordi Meeuwisse 83.46	2
(England) Jamie Caven 91.15	6
(Wales) Jonathan Worsley 87.95	2
(England) Keegan Brown 98.66	6
(England) Mick Todd 84.69	3
(Netherlands) Jermaine Wattimena 85.01	6
(Wales) Jonny Clayton 77.44	6
(Germany) Manfred Bilderl 72.00	1

Second round (best of 11 legs); 14 October
1	(Netherlands) Michael van Gerwen 91.47	6
(Austria) Zoran Lerchbacher 85.33	3
16	(England) Stephen Bunting 99.87	6
(Germany) René Eidams 96.13	4
8	(England) Alan Norris 97.24	6
(England) James Richardson 99.02	4
9	(England) Joe Cullen 91.62	6
(England) Steve West 77.33	2
5	(Northern Ireland) Daryl Gurney 95.27	3
(England) Andy Boulton 103.25	6
12	(England) Ian White 99.46	5
(Netherlands) Vincent van der Voort 96.11	6
4	(Australia) Simon Whitlock 94.31	6
(Poland) Krzysztof Ratajski 95.41	4
13	(England) Mervyn King 91.28	1
(Netherlands) Jan Dekker 98.34	6
2	(Scotland) Peter Wright 90.19	6
(Germany) Martin Schindler 88.29	4
15	(Belgium) Kim Huybrechts 95.16	6
(England) Nathan Aspinall 93.75	3
7	(England) Dave Chisnall 90.69	6
(England) James Wilson 88.80	4
10	(Netherlands) Jelle Klaasen 94.11	6
(England) Chris Dobey 79.26	1
6	(England) Rob Cross 99.74	6
(England) Jamie Caven 89.20	5
11	(Netherlands) Benito van de Pas 88.83	0
(England) Keegan Brown 99.10	6
3	(England) Michael Smith 96.43	6
(Netherlands) Jermaine Wattimena 84.02	3
14	(Wales) Gerwyn Price 90.28	3
(Wales) Jonny Clayton 91.77	6

Third round (best of 11 legs); 15 October
1	(Netherlands) van Gerwen 100.60	6
16	(England) Bunting 95.40	1
8	(England) Norris 86.78	2
9	(England) Cullen 94.38	6
(England) Boulton 88.42	6
(Netherlands) van der Voort 91.64	4
4	(Australia) Whitlock 99.57	6
(Netherlands) Dekker 89.25	2
2	(Scotland) Wright 110.59	3
15	(Belgium) Huybrechts 98.71	6
7	(England) Chisnall 100.31	6
10	(Netherlands) Klaasen 83.39	3
6	(England) Cross 105.40	6
(England) Brown 83.29	2
3	(England) Smith 94.73	6
(Wales) Clayton 89.82	3

Quarter-finals (best of 11 legs); 15 October
1	(Netherlands) van Gerwen 103.66	6
9	(England) Cullen 88.39	0
(England) Boulton 87.95	4
4	(Australia) Whitlock 93.59	6
15	(Belgium) Huybrechts 99.82	6
7	(England) Chisnall 97.81	4
6	(England) Cross 93.15	6
3	(England) Smith 79.02	3

Semi-finals (best of 11 legs); 15 October
1	(Netherlands) van Gerwen 110.39	6
4	(Australia) Whitlock 98.15	1
15	(Belgium) Huybrechts 83.42	1
6	(England) Cross 98.80	6

Final (best of 11 legs); 15 October
1	(Netherlands) van Gerwen 96.70	6
6	(England) Cross 93.23	4
