= 2019 International Darts Open =

Tournament information
- Dates: 13–15 September 2019
- Venue: SACHSENarena
- Location: Riesa
- Country: Germany
- Organisation(s): PDC
- Format: Legs
- Prize fund: £140,000
- Winner's share: £25,000
- High checkout: 161 (England) Joe Murnan (England) Steve West

Champion(s)
- (Wales) Gerwyn Price

The 2019 International Darts Open was the twelfth of thirteen PDC European Tour events on the 2019 PDC Pro Tour. The tournament took place at the SACHSENarena, Riesa, Germany, from 13–15 September 2019. It featured a field of 48 players and £140,000 in prize money, with £25,000 going to the winner.

Gerwyn Price was the defending champion after defeating Simon Whitlock 8–3 in the previous year's final, and he successfully defended his title, by defeating Rob Cross 8–6 in the final. It was his second Euro Tour title, while Cross failed to get over the line in his fourth consecutive European final.

== Prize money ==
This is how the prize money is divided:

Stage (num. of players)		Prize money
Winner	(1)	£25,000
Runner-up	(1)	£10,000
Semi-finalists	(2)	£6,500
Quarter-finalists	(4)	£5,000
Third round losers	(8)	£3,000
Second round losers	(16)	£2,000*
First round losers	(16)	£1,000
Total	£140,000	

- Seeded players who lose in the second round do not receive this prize money on any Orders of Merit.

== Qualification and format ==
The top 16 entrants from the PDC ProTour Order of Merit on 25 June will automatically qualify for the event and will be seeded in the second round.

The remaining 32 places will go to players from six qualifying events – 18 from the UK Tour Card Holder Qualifier (held on 2 August), six from the European Tour Card Holder Qualifier (held on 2 August), two from the West & South European Associate Member Qualifier (held on 12 September), four from the Host Nation Qualifier (held on 12 September), one from the Nordic & Baltic Qualifier (held on 24 August), and one from the East European Qualifier (held on 25 August).

From 2019, the Host Nation, Nordic & Baltic and East European Qualifiers will only be available to non-Tour Card holders. Any Tour Card holders from the applicable regions will have to play the main European Qualifier.

Michael van Gerwen and Dave Chisnall, who were set to be the 1st seed and 4th seed respectively, withdrew prior to the tournament. All seeds below Van Gerwen moved up a place and all seeds below Chisnall moved up two places. Jeffrey de Zwaan and Jamie Hughes became 15th seed and 16th seed respectively, and an extra two places were made available in the Host Nation Qualifier.

The following players will take part in the tournament:

Top 16

1. (England) Ian White (second round)
2. (Wales) Gerwyn Price (champion)
3. (Northern Ireland) Daryl Gurney (quarter-finals)
4. (Scotland) Peter Wright (semi-finals)
5. (England) Adrian Lewis (quarter-finals)
6. (Poland) Krzysztof Ratajski (second round)
7. (England) Nathan Aspinall (quarter-finals)
8. (England) Joe Cullen (third round)
9. (England) Rob Cross (runner-up)
10. (England) Ricky Evans (third round)
11. (England) Glen Durrant (semi-finals)
12. (Wales) Jonny Clayton (third round)
13. (Austria) Mensur Suljović (third round)
14. (England) Steve Beaton (third round)
15. (Netherlands) Jeffrey de Zwaan (second round)
16. (England) Jamie Hughes (second round)

UK Qualifier
- (England) Reece Robinson (first round)
- (England) Brett Claydon (first round)
- (England) Adam Hunt (first round)
- (England) Joe Murnan (third round)
- (Scotland) John Henderson (second round)
- (England) James Richardson (second round)
- (England) Ritchie Edhouse (second round)
- (England) Luke Woodhouse (second round)
- (Australia) Kyle Anderson (second round)
- (England) Arron Monk (first round)
- (Northern Ireland) Mickey Mansell (first round)
- (Republic of Ireland) William O'Connor (second round)
- (England) Steve West (third round)
- (England) Justin Pipe (second round)
- (England) Harry Ward (second round)
- (England) Richard North (quarter-finals)
- (England) Andy Boulton (first round)

European Qualifier
- (Belgium) Davy Van Baelen (second round)
- (Netherlands) Danny Noppert (second round)
- (Netherlands) Benito van de Pas (first round)
- (Belgium) Dimitri Van den Bergh (second round)
- (Netherlands) Jelle Klaasen (first round)

West/South European Qualifier
- (Belgium) Davyd Venken (first round)
- (Belgium) Mike De Decker (first round)

Host Nation Qualifier
- (Germany) Christian Jentschke (first round)
- (Germany) Mike Poge (first round)
- (Germany) Steffen Siepmann (second round)
- (Germany) Ole Luckow (first round)
- (Germany) Manfred Bilderl (first round)
- (Germany) Michael Rosenauer (third round)

Nordic & Baltic Qualifier
- (Sweden) Daniel Larsson (first round)

East European Qualifier
- (Russia) Boris Koltsov (first round)

== Draw ==
First round (best of 11 legs); 13 September
(England) Richard North 88.69	6
(Russia) Boris Koltsov 86.17	5
(Sweden) Daniel Larsson 81.09	3
(England) Steve West 94.34	6
(Belgium) Davy Van Baelen 103.66	6
(Germany) Ole Luckow 89.45	0
(Scotland) John Henderson 79.79	6
(England) Brett Claydon 82.94	4
(Republic of Ireland) William O'Connor 92.90	6
(Netherlands) Benito van de Pas 86.90	4
(England) Andy Boulton 88.21	5
(Germany) Steffen Siepmann 85.34	6
(England) Ritchie Edhouse 88.05	6
(Belgium) Davyd Venken 80.35	2
(England) Harry Ward 81.49	6
(England) Reece Robinson 81.00	4
(England) Arron Monk 97.34	5
(Australia) Kyle Anderson 99.63	6
(England) Joe Murnan 85.76	6
(Netherlands) Jelle Klaasen 89.19	5
(Germany) Christian Jentschke 75.17	3
(England) Justin Pipe 80.96	6
(England) Adam Hunt 93.58	3
(Belgium) Dimitri Van den Bergh 98.67	6
(Belgium) Mike De Decker 81.80	4
(Germany) Michael Rosenauer 81.66	6
(England) James Richardson 82.97	6
(Germany) Mike Poge 70.33	3
(Northern Ireland) Mickey Mansell 88.60	5
(Netherlands) Danny Noppert 94.32	6
(Germany) Manfred Bilderl 82.64	1
(England) Luke Woodhouse 94.84	6

Second round (best of 11 legs); 14 September
1	(England) Ian White 96.13	5
(England) Richard North 92.12	6
16	(England) Jamie Hughes 93.16	3
(England) Steve West 98.01	6
8	(England) Joe Cullen 95.04	6
(Belgium) Davy Van Baelen 85.51	5
9	(England) Rob Cross 101.56	6
(Scotland) John Henderson 93.27	1
5	(England) Adrian Lewis 81.02	6
(Republic of Ireland) William O'Connor 84.99	4
12	(Wales) Jonny Clayton 96.59	6
(Germany) Steffen Siepmann 89.73	4
4	(Scotland) Peter Wright 96.47	6
(England) Ritchie Edhouse 96.59	4
13	(Austria) Mensur Suljović 101.33	6
(England) Harry Ward 83.07	0
2	(Wales) Gerwyn Price 106.20	6
(Australia) Kyle Anderson 100.41	4
15	(Netherlands) Jeffrey de Zwaan 85.73	3
(England) Joe Murnan 87.53	6
7	(England) Nathan Aspinall 99.26	6
(England) Justin Pipe 96.79	3
10	(England) Ricky Evans 93.23	6
(Belgium) Dimitri Van den Bergh 98.46	4
6	(Poland) Krzysztof Ratajski 85.13	3
(Germany) Michael Rosenauer 83.51	6
11	(England) Glen Durrant 97.97	6
(England) James Richardson 100.39	3
3	(Northern Ireland) Daryl Gurney 99.60	6
(Netherlands) Danny Noppert 98.56	5
14	(England) Steve Beaton 89.77	6
(England) Luke Woodhouse 87.83	4

Third round (best of 11 legs); 15 September
(England) North 88.13	6
(England) West 89.31	5
8	(England) Cullen 91.18	0
9	(England) Cross 101.33	6
5	(England) Lewis 91.00	6
12	(Wales) Clayton 86.48	2
4	(Scotland) Wright 94.94	6
13	(Austria) Suljović 88.06	3
2	(Wales) Price 96.08	6
(England) Murnan 88.55	4
7	(England) Aspinall 96.94	6
10	(England) Evans 93.59	5
(Germany) Rosenauer 79.24	3
11	(England) Durrant 92.24	6
3	(Northern Ireland) Gurney 102.14	6
14	(England) Beaton 95.03	5

Quarter-finals (best of 11 legs); 15 September
(England) North 93.15	1
9	(England) Cross 102.36	6
5	(England) Lewis 83.04	0
4	(Scotland) Wright 100.20	6
2	(Wales) Price 94.27	6
7	(England) Aspinall 91.89	4
11	(England) Durrant 100.23	6
3	(Northern Ireland) Gurney 91.31	4

Semi-finals (best of 13 legs); 15 September
9	(England) Cross 91.54	7
4	(Scotland) Wright 92.72	6
2	(Wales) Price 101.89	7
11	(England) Durrant 98.02	3

Final (best of 15 legs); 15 September
9	(England) Cross 90.92	6
2	(Wales) Price 93.04	8
