= Ricardo Perez (darts player) =

Spanish darts player (born 1988)

Personal information
- Full name: Ricardo Perez Ibarra
- Born: 4 April 1988 (age 38) Spain
- Home town: Spain

Sport
- Sport: Darts
- Darts: 18g Cosmo
- Laterality: Right-handed

Organisation (see split in darts)
- BDO: 2018–2020
- PDC: 2023–
- WDF: 2018–

WDF major events – best performances
- World Masters: Last 32: 2022
Medal record
Men's Darts
Representing Spain
EDU European Ch'ship
Gold medal – first place	2022 Benidorm	Men's cricket
Gold medal – first place	2023 Benidorm	Men's singles
EDF European Ch'ship
Silver medal – second place	2022 Podčetrtek	Men's cricket

Ricardo Perez Ibarra (born 4 April 1988) is a Spanish professional soft-tip and steel-tip darts player who currently plays in the World Darts Federation (WDF) and Professional Darts Corporation (PDC) events. He is an EDU European Darts Champion and EDF European Darts Championship silver medalist.

== Career ==
Perez played his first tournaments on electronic dartboards. In 2018, thanks to good results in domestic steel-tip tournaments, he was invited to participate in the 2018 Winmau World Masters. He advanced to the third round where he lost to Aaron Turner by 1–3 in sets. A month later, at the Italian Open, he advanced to the final, where he lost to Martin Adams by 5–6 in legs. It was his first final on steel-tip tournament.

He returned to international competitions in 2022, when he won the gold medal in cricket competition at the EDU European Darts Championship. In the final of the tournament he defeated Dragutin Pecnjak. He won another medal individually during EDF European Darts Championship, but in the final he lost to Boris Krčmar. In December 2022, he took part in the 2022 Winmau World Masters, where he advanced to the final phase of the tournament. In the fourth round he lost to Vítězslav Sedlák by 1–5 in legs.

In January 2023, he took part in the PDC Q-School qualifying tournament.

== Performance timeline ==
Tournament	2018	2022
WDF Ranked televised events
World Masters	3R	4R
