= 2014 Apatin Open darts =

Apatin Open

Tournament information
- Dates: 5 July 2014
- Country: Serbia
- Organisation(s): WDF
- Winner's share: €600

Champion(s)
- (Croatia) Boris Krcmar

2014 Apatin Open is a darts tournament, which took place in Apatin, Serbia in 2014.

== Results ==
Quarter-finals
(Croatia)	Boris Krcmar	4
(Croatia)	Zdravko Antunovic	3
(Serbia)	Aco Babic	4
(Serbia)	Sveta Mijalkovic	1
(Slovenia)	Vastimir Gavrilovic	4
(Serbia)	Atila Kuruc	1
(Serbia)	Aleksandar Boric	4
(Hungary)	Nandor Bezzeg	3

Semi-finals
(Croatia)	Boris Krcmar	5
(Serbia)	Aco Babic	0
(Slovenia)	Vastimir Gavrilovic	5
(Serbia)	Aleksandar Boric	2

Final
(Croatia)	Boris Krcmar	6
(Slovenia)	Vastimir Gavrilovic	4
