= Dietmar Burger =

Austrian darts player

Personal information
- Nickname: "Didi"
- Born: 19 July 1968 (age 58) Austria
- Home town: Vienna, Austria

Sport
- Sport: Darts
- Playing since: 1994
- Darts: 16 Gram Unicorn
- Laterality: Right-handed
- Walk-on music: "T.N.T" by AC/DC

Organisation (see split in darts)
- BDO: 2002–2007, 2013–2014
- PDC: 2008–2012, 2018–

WDF major events – best performances
- World Masters: Last 64: 2006
- World Trophy: Last 56: 2007

PDC premier events – best performances
- World Championship: Last 72: 2011, 2012

Other tournament wins
- Years
Austria Ch'ship	2007, 2008
Austrian Open	2004
Czech Open	2005, 2006
Finnish Open	2007
GDC Koln	2008
Hungarian Open	2005
PDC World Qualifying	2010, 2011
Medal record
Men's Darts
Representing Austria
EDU European Ch'ship
Gold medal – first place	2002 St. Johann	Men's singles
Gold medal – first place	2005 Sopron	Men's cricket
Gold medal – first place	2006 Umag	Men's cricket

Dietmar Burger (born 19 July 1968) is an Austrian professional darts player who plays in Professional Darts Corporation (PDC) events.

== Career ==
Burger won the Czech Open back-to-back in 2005 and 2006 and then won the Finnish Open in 2007, an event previously won by some of the game's biggest names, such as Phil Taylor, John Lowe, Andy Fordham and Raymond van Barneveld.

In 2008, Burger began playing in the GDC, an organisation affiliated with the Professional Darts Corporation where the highest ranked player earns qualification to the PDC World Darts Championship. Burger won the season's first tournament in Cologne, but early exits in Niedernhausen and another Ramada Hotel led him to slip down the GDC rankings. Burger also went on to win the Austrian National Championship for a second straight year.

In 2009 the GDC was dissolved and replaced with the PDC European Order of Merit which has seen Burger play in fewer tournaments in the PDC circuit.

Burger qualified for the 2011 PDC World Darts Championship after defeating compatriot Christian Kallinger to win the East European qualifying event. He lost in the preliminary round against Magnus Caris by 4 legs to 3, despite being 3–2 up and having darts for the match.

He represented Austria with Mensur Suljović in the 2012 PDC World Cup of Darts and together they were beaten 1–3 by the Netherlands in the second round, having defeated New Zealand in round one. In April, Burger reached the semi-finals of the Home Nation Qualifier for the Austrian Darts Open. He lost 6–1 to Suljović, but still did enough to earn a place in the draw for the event later in the month, where he played Terry Jenkins in the first round and lost 6–4.

In 2014, Burger won through to the semi-finals of the East European Qualifier for the 2015 World Championship, but was narrowly beaten 8–7 by Boris Krčmar. He lost to Rusty Jake Rodriguez in the final of the 2016 Hungarian Open and 10–1 to Zoran Lerchbacher in the final of the East European Qualifier for the 2017 World Championship.

== World Championship results ==
=== PDC ===
- 2011: Preliminary round (lost to Magnus Caris 3–4) (legs)
- 2012: Preliminary round (lost to Christian Perez 0–4) (legs)
