= Manfred Bilderl =

German darts player

Personal information
- Nickname: "Beaver"
- Born: 24 September 1967 (age 59) Nürnberg, Bavaria, Germany
- Home town: Ahlen, Germany

Sport
- Sport: Darts
- Playing since: 1994
- Darts: 18g
- Laterality: Right-handed
- Walk-on music: "I Gotta Feeling" by Black Eyed Peas

Organisation (see split in darts)
- BDO: 2006–2017
- PDC: 2017–
Medal record
Men's Darts
Representing Germany
EDU European Ch'ship
Bronze medal – third place	2003 Salou	Men's cricket
Bronze medal – third place	2004 Hamburg	Men's cricket

Manfred Bilderl (born 24 September 1967) is a German professional darts player playing in Professional Darts Corporation (PDC) events.

== Career ==
Bilderl qualified for the 2017 European Darts Trophy, where he lost 6–1 to Jonny Clayton. The following year, he qualified for the 2018 German Darts Masters in the 2018 World Series of Darts, where he lost 6–0 to Raymond van Barneveld in the first round.

Bilderl also made it through to the 2019 International Darts Open, but was beaten 6–1 by Luke Woodhouse.

Bilderl beat Phil Taylor 3–2 in his first round game at the 2024 World Seniors Darts Championship.
