= 2013 Austrian Darts Open =

Tournament information
- Dates: 31 May–2 June 2013
- Venue: Arena Nova
- Location: Wiener Neustadt
- Country: Austria
- Organisation(s): PDC
- Format: Legs
- Prize fund: £100,000
- Winner's share: £20,000

Champion(s)
- (Netherlands) Michael van Gerwen

The 2013 Austrian Darts Open was the fourth of eight PDC European Tour events on the 2013 PDC Pro Tour. The tournament took place at the Arena Nova in Wiener Neustadt, Austria, from 31 May–2 June 2013. It featured a field of 64 players and £100,000 in prize money, with £20,000 going to the winner.

Michael van Gerwen won his second European Tour title by beating Mervyn King 6–3 in the final.

== Prize money ==
| Stage (num. of players) | | Prize money |
|---|---|---|
| Winner | (1) | £20,000 |
| Runner-up | (1) | £10,000 |
| Semi-finalists | (2) | £5,000 |
| Quarter-finalists | (4) | £3,000 |
| Third round losers | (8) | £2,000 |
| Second round losers | (16) | £1,000 |
| First round losers | (32) | £500 |
| Total | £100,000 | |

== Qualification ==
The top 32 players from the PDC ProTour Order of Merit on the 29 April 2013 automatically qualified for the event. The remaining 32 places went to players from three qualifying events - 20 from the UK Qualifier (held in Wigan on 3 May), eight from the European Qualifier and four from the Host Nation Qualifier (both held at the venue in Wiener Neustadt on 30 May).

Simon Whitlock, Adrian Lewis and Phil Taylor all withdrew before the event started. Two additional places were therefore available in the European Qualifier and one extra place was available in the Home Nation Qualifier. Peter Martin withdrew due to travel problems, so Mervyn King received a bye to Round 2.

1–32

1. (Netherlands) Michael van Gerwen (winner)
2. ~~(Australia) Simon Whitlock (withdrew)~~
3. (England) Dave Chisnall (third round)
4. (England) Wes Newton (third round)
5. (Scotland) Robert Thornton (third round)
6. (Netherlands) Raymond van Barneveld (third round)
7. (England) Justin Pipe (first round)
8. (England) Ian White (first round)
9. (Canada) John Part (first round)
10. ~~(England) Adrian Lewis (withdrew)~~
11. (Belgium) Kim Huybrechts (first round)
12. (Scotland) Peter Wright (second round)
13. (England) Andy Hamilton (second round)
14. ~~(England) Phil Taylor (withdrew)~~
15. (Australia) Paul Nicholson (first round)
16. (England) Ronnie Baxter (third round)
17. (England) Terry Jenkins (second round)
18. (England) James Wade (third round)
19. (England) Mervyn King (runner-up)
20. (England) Colin Lloyd (semi-finals)
21. (Wales) Mark Webster (first round)
22. (England) Stuart Kellett (second round)
23. (Wales) Richie Burnett (first round)
24. (Northern Ireland) Brendan Dolan (quarter-finals)
25. (Scotland) Gary Anderson (second round)
26. (England) Andy Smith (second round)
27. (England) Kevin Painter (second round)
28. (England) Mark Walsh (second round)
29. (England) Colin Osborne (first round)
30. (England) Jamie Caven (second round)
31. (England) Arron Monk (first round)
32. (England) Wayne Jones (second round)

UK Qualifier

- (England) Terry Temple (first round)
- (Wales) Jamie Lewis (first round)
- (England) Kevin McDine (third round)
- (England) Paul Barham (first round)
- (England) Steve Beaton (semi-finals)
- (England) Ross Smith (third round)
- (England) Nigel Heydon (second round)
- (England) Alan Tabern (first round)
- (England) Steve West (second round)
- (England) Steve Hine (first round)
- (England) John Bowles (first round)
- (England) Darren Webster (first round)
- (England) Joe Murnan (first round)
- (Scotland) John Henderson (second round)
- (Scotland) Jim Walker (second round)
- (England) Dennis Smith (quarter-finals)
- (England) Peter Hudson (first round)
- (England) Kevin Dowling (second round)
- (Republic of Ireland) Campbell Jackson (first round)
- (England) Joe Cullen (quarter-finals)

European Qualifier

- ~~(Slovakia) Peter Martin (withdrew)~~
- (Germany) Max Hopp (first round)
- (Netherlands) Roland Scholten (first round)
- (Germany) Bernd Roith (first round)
- (Netherlands) Vincent van der Voort (first round)
- (Germany) Tomas Seyler (second round)
- (Belgium) Ronny Huybrechts (first round)
- (Spain) Antonio Alcinas (first round)
- (Netherlands) Leon de Geus (first round)
- (Netherlands) Jelle Klaasen (quarter-finals)

Host Nation Qualifier

- (Austria) Andreas Pur (first round)
- (Austria) Günther Rimser (first round)
- (Austria) Mensur Suljović (first round)
- (Austria) Christian Kallinger (first round)
- (Austria) Erwin Freidl (first round)

== Draw ==
First round (best of 11 legs); 31 May
1 | (Netherlands) Michael van Gerwen 92.97 | 6
(England) Alan Tabern 85.57 | 1
32 | (England) Wayne Jones 82.55 | 6
(Republic of Ireland) Campbell Jackson 85.88 | 4
16 | (England) Ronnie Baxter 101.26 | 6
(England) Peter Hudson 94.33 | 5
17 | (England) Terry Jenkins 76.42 | 6
(Austria) Günther Rimser 54.27 | 0
8 | (England) Ian White 86.29 | 4
(England) Ross Smith 86.23 | 6
25 | (Scotland) Gary Anderson 98.98 | 6
(England) John Bowles 93.81 | 3
9 | (Canada) John Part 91.05 | 3
(England) Kevin Dowling 95.15 | 6
24 | (Northern Ireland) Brendan Dolan 94.50 | 6
(England) Joe Murnan 91.94 | 3
5 | (Scotland) Robert Thornton 92.20 | 6
(Netherlands) Vincent van der Voort 89.78 | 5
28 | (England) Mark Walsh 87.08 | 6
(Austria) Christian Kallinger 85.58 | 3
12 | (Scotland) Peter Wright 95.42 | 6
(Germany) Max Hopp 86.86 | 1
21 | (Wales) Mark Webster 86.57 | 4
(England) Dennis Smith 91.67 | 6
4 | (England) Wes Newton 87.82 | 6
(England) Paul Barham 78.89 | 4
29 | (England) Colin Osborne 88.41 | 3
(England) Steve West 91.27 | 6
13 | (England) Andy Hamilton 88.04 | 6
(Netherlands) Roland Scholten 92.25 | 4
20 | (England) Colin Lloyd 94.55 | 6
(Wales) Jamie Lewis 96.73 | 5
Alt | (Netherlands) Jelle Klaasen 90.93 | 6
(England) Steve Hine 92.26 | 5
31 | (England) Arron Monk 86.68 | 2
(Germany) Tomas Seyler 94.94 | 6
15 | (Australia) Paul Nicholson 94.21 | 4
(England) Nigel Heydon 93.87 | 6
18 | (England) James Wade 93.57 | 6
(Belgium) Ronny Huybrechts 89.72 | 5
7 | (England) Justin Pipe 90.44 | 3
(England) Kevin McDine 96.91 | 6
26 | (England) Andy Smith 98.58 | 6
(Austria) Mensur Suljović 89.76 | 1
Alt | (Austria) Erwin Freidl 84.60 | 4
(England) Steve Beaton 86.67 | 6
23 | (Wales) Richie Burnett 90.18 | 3
(Scotland) John Henderson 95.78 | 6
6 | (Netherlands) Raymond van Barneveld 84.78 | 6
(Spain) Antonio Alcinas 81.25 | 5
27 | (England) Kevin Painter 87.51 | 6
(England) Terry Temple 85.44 | 4
11 | (Belgium) Kim Huybrechts 100.62 | 4
(England) Joe Cullen 97.04 | 6
22 | (England) Stuart Kellett 95.20 | 6
(England) Darren Webster 91.84 | 4
3 | (England) Dave Chisnall 90.18 | 6
(Austria) Andreas Pur 69.09 | 0
30 | (England) Jamie Caven 96.29 | 6
(Germany) Bernd Roith 83.78 | 2
Alt | (Netherlands) Leon de Geus 87.15 | 1
(Scotland) Jim Walker 102.98 | 6
19 | (England) Mervyn King | w/o
(Slovakia) Peter Martin | w/d

Second round (best of 11 legs); 1 June
1 | (Netherlands) van Gerwen 96.20 | 6
32 | (England) Jones 84.38 | 1
16 | (England) Baxter 92.91 | 6
17 | (England) Jenkins 89.04 | 5
(England) R. Smith 91.98 | 6
25 | (Scotland) Anderson 97.53 | 3
(England) Dowling 77.66 | 4
24 | (Northern Ireland) Dolan 81.05 | 6
5 | (Scotland) Thornton 92.22 | 6
28 | (England) Walsh 82.75 | 4
12 | (Scotland) Wright 91.02 | 5
(England) D. Smith 91.28 | 6
4 | (England) Newton 101.68 | 6
(England) S. West 104.58 | 4
13 | (England) Hamilton 69.97 | 0
20 | (England) Lloyd 92.97 | 6
Alt | (Netherlands) Klaasen 90.50 | 6
(Germany) Seyler 81.02 | 4
(England) Heydon 88.63 | 1
18 | (England) Wade 102.41 | 6
(England) McDine 98.31 | 6
26 | (England) A. Smith 96.74 | 3
(England) Beaton 99.87 | 6
(Scotland) Henderson 93.37 | 5
6 | (Netherlands) van Barneveld 93.19 | 6
27 | (England) Painter 92.03 | 4
(England) Cullen 111.84 | 6
22 | (England) Kellett 97.34 | 1
3 | (England) Chisnall 95.10 | 6
30 | (England) Caven 89.86 | 5
(Scotland) Walker 84.02 | 4
19 | (England) King 92.89 | 6

Third round (best of 11 legs); 2 June
1 | (Netherlands) van Gerwen 99.87 | 6
16 | (England) Baxter 92.86 | 3
(England) R. Smith 90.88 | 5
24 | (Northern Ireland) Dolan 85.68 | 6
5 | (Scotland) Thornton 99.99 | 1
(England) D. Smith 102.98 | 6
4 | (England) Newton 87.13 | 4
20 | (England) Lloyd 88.64 | 6
Alt | (Netherlands) Klaasen 100.14 | 6
18 | (England) Wade 100.44 | 5
(England) McDine 93.06 | 1
(England) Beaton 95.66 | 6
6 | (Netherlands) van Barneveld 91.52 | 5
(England) Cullen 95.10 | 6
3 | (England) Chisnall 94.84 | 5
19 | (England) King 94.70 | 6

Quarter-finals (best of 11 legs); 2 June
1 | (Netherlands) van Gerwen 91.09 | 6
24 | (Northern Ireland) Dolan 83.81 | 3
(England) D. Smith 84.06 | 0
20 | (England) Lloyd 88.41 | 6
Alt | (Netherlands) Klaasen 91.51 | 2
(England) Beaton 84.74 | 6
(England) Cullen 89.04 | 0
19 | (England) King 103.66 | 6

Semi-finals (best of 11 legs); 2 June
1 | (Netherlands) van Gerwen 100.91 | 6
20 | (England) Lloyd 83.04 | 2
(England) Beaton 92.57 | 5
19 | (England) King 96.02 | 6

Final (best of 11 legs); 2 June
1 | (Netherlands) van Gerwen 89.82 | 6
19 | (England) King 82.03 | 3
