= 2010 PDC World Cup of Darts =

Tournament information
- Dates: 3–5 December 2010
- Venue: Rainton Meadows Arena
- Location: Houghton-le-Spring
- Country: England
- Organisation(s): PDC
- Format: Legs
- Prize fund: £150,000
- Winner's share: £40,000
- High checkout: 170 (Australia) Simon Whitlock (semi-finals)

Champion(s)
- Netherlands (Raymond van Barneveld and Co Stompé)

The 2010 PDC World Cup of Darts, known as the 2010 Cash Converters World Cup of Darts for sponsorship reasons, was the first edition of the PDC World Cup of Darts which took place between 3–5 December 2010 at the Rainton Meadows Arena in Houghton-le-Spring, England.

The tournament was won by Raymond van Barneveld and Co Stompé for the Netherlands, who defeated Mark Webster and Barrie Bates of Wales in the final.

== Format ==
The participating teams were the top 24 countries in the PDC Order of Merit at the end of October after the 2010 World Grand Prix. Each nations top ranked player was then joined by the second highest player of that country. For seeding the average rank of both was used.

The top 8 nations automatically started in the second round (last 16). The other 16 nations played in the first round. Matches were best of 11 legs in doubles, and the losing team threw first in the next leg. The winners of the first round played the top eight ranked teams in the second round, also in best of 11 doubles.

The winners of the second round were placed into two groups of four (A & B). The teams in Group A would be seeds 2, 3, 6 & 7 (or whoever beat those seeds in the second round), and the teams in Group B would be seeds 1, 4, 5 & 8 (or whoever beat those seeds in the second round). Each team played each other once (three matches per team). Each match consisted of two singles and one doubles - all over best of five legs. 1 point was awarded for a singles win, and 2 points for a doubles win, with all points counting towards the overall league table. The top two teams in each group advanced to the semi-finals.

The semi-finals consisted of four singles games and one doubles game (if required) per match - all over best of 11 legs. Again, 1 point was awarded for a singles win, and 2 points for a doubles win. If the match score was 3–3 at the end of the games, then a sudden-death doubles leg would decide who goes through to the final.

The final was the same format as the semi-final, but each game was best of 15 legs.

== Prize money ==
Position (no. of teams)		Prize money (Total: £150,000)
Winners	(1)	£40,000
Runners-up	(1)	£20,000
Semi-finalists	(2)	£12,000
Third place in group stage	(2)	£8,000
Fourth place in group stage	(2)	£5,000
Last 16 (second round)	(8)	£3,000
Last 24 (first round)	(8)	£2,000

== Teams and seeding ==
Rank	Country	Top Two Ranked Players	Start In
1	England	Phil Taylor and James Wade	Round 2
2	Netherlands	Raymond van Barneveld and Co Stompé	Round 2
3	Australia	Simon Whitlock and Paul Nicholson	Round 2
4	Scotland	Gary Anderson and Robert Thornton	Round 2
5	Wales	Mark Webster and Barrie Bates	Round 2
6	Northern Ireland	Brendan Dolan and John MaGowan	Round 2
7	Canada	John Part and Ken MacNeil	Round 2
8	United States	Darin Young and Bill Davis	Round 2
9	Ireland	Mick McGowan and William O'Connor	Round 1
10	Germany	Jyhan Artut and Andree Welge	Round 1
11	Spain	Carlos Rodríguez and Antonio Alcinas	Round 1
12	Finland	Jarkko Komula and Marko Kantele	Round 1
13	New Zealand	Phillip Hazel and Warren Parry	Round 1
14	Austria	Mensur Suljović and Maik Langendorf	Round 1
15	Sweden	Magnus Caris and Pär Riihonen	Round 1
16	Russia	Anastasia Dobromyslova and Roman Konchikov	Round 1
17	Gibraltar	Dylan Duo and Dyson Parody	Round 1
18	Slovenia	Osmann Kijamet and Sebastijan Pečjak	Round 1
19	Denmark	Per Laursen and Vladimir Andersen	Round 1
20	Poland	Krzysztof Kciuk and Krzysztof Ratajski	Round 1
21	Belgium	Patrick Bulen and Rocco Maes	Round 1
22	Japan	Haruki Muramatsu and Taro Yachi	Round 1
23	Czech Republic	Martin Kapucian and Pavel Drtil	Round 1
24	Slovakia	Peter Martin and Oto Zmelik	Round 1

== Results ==
=== First and second rounds ===
The matches were best of 11 legs in the doubles format.

First round 3 December (afternoon)
Finland (12) 82.83	2
Belgium (21) 83.93	6
Sweden (15) 86.58	6
Slovenia (18) 70.49	2
Austria (14) 86.63	6
Denmark (19) 82.85	4
New Zealand (13) 83.73	6
Poland (20) 74.37	2
Russia (16) 74.46	6
Gibraltar (17) 71.61	4
Germany (10)	w/o
Czech Republic (23)	w/d
Spain (11) 87.87	6
Japan (22) 81.80	3
Ireland (9) 74.04	6
Slovakia (24) 74.90	3

Second round 3 December (evening)
Canada (7) 86.66	6
Belgium (21) 82.85	5
United States (8) 83.64	6
Sweden (15) 81.07	4
Northern Ireland (6) 79.97	3
Austria (14) 85.33	6
Wales (5) 85.04	6
New Zealand (13) 85.13	4
Scotland (4) 87.18	6
Russia (16) 75.27	2
Netherlands (2) 91.62	6
Germany (10) 81.79	2
England (1) 99.33	5
Spain (11) 92.31	6
Australia (3) 82.96	6
Ireland (9) 80.36	5

Germany had a bye to the second round, as the Czech Republic were unable to travel due to the inclement weather.

=== Group stage ===
Singles matches were worth one point, doubles matches were worth two points. The top two teams in each group advanced to the semi-finals.

NB: P = Played; W = Won; L = Lost; LF = Legs for; LA = Legs against; +/- = Plus/minus record, in relation to legs; Pts = Points

==== Group A – 4 December (afternoon) ====
POS	Team	P	W	L	LF	LA	+/-	Pts	Status
1	Netherlands (2)	3	3	0	22	18	+4	9	Advance to semi-finals
2	Australia (3)	3	2	1	22	17	+5	8	Advance to semi-finals
3	Canada (7)	3	1	2	18	19	–1	5	Eliminated
4	Austria (14)	3	0	3	16	24	–8	2	Eliminated

Country	Points	Country
90.50 Netherlands (2)	3 – 1	Canada (7) 84.25
Player(s)	Legs	Player(s)
92.02 Raymond van Barneveld	3 – 0	Ken MacNeil 79.12
92.55 Co Stompé	2 – 3	John Part 85.56
87.65 van Barneveld & Stompé	3 – 2	MacNeil & Part 86.30

Country	Points	Country
81.15 Austria (14)	0 – 4	Australia (3) 94.61
Player(s)	Legs	Player(s)
89.30 Mensur Suljović	2 – 3	Paul Nicholson 92.29
83.90 Maik Langendorf	1 – 3	Simon Whitlock 99.05
70.32 Suljović & Langendorf	2 – 3	Nicholson & Whitlock 93.60

Country	Points	Country
87.33 Netherlands (2)	3 – 1	Austria (14) 84.78
Player(s)	Legs	Player(s)
82.82 Raymond van Barneveld	3 – 2	Maik Langendorf 81.17
89.83 Co Stompé	2 – 3	Mensur Suljović 89.87
90.04 van Barneveld & Stompé	3 – 2	Langendorf & Suljović 84.25

Country	Points	Country
98.70 Canada (7)	1 – 3	Australia (3) 96.38
Player(s)	Legs	Player(s)
97.18 John Part	2 – 3	Paul Nicholson 96.99
100.27 Ken MacNeil	3 – 1	Simon Whitlock 84.64
99.00 Part & MacNeil	1 – 3	Nicholson & Whitlock 108.41

Country	Points	Country
90.21 Netherlands (2)	3 – 1	Australia (3) 93.72
Player(s)	Legs	Player(s)
91.50 Raymond van Barneveld	3 – 1	Paul Nicholson 91.94
79.28 Co Stompé	0 – 3	Simon Whitlock 90.18
97.33 van Barneveld & Stompé	3 – 2	Nicholson & Whitlock 97.56

Country	Points	Country
89.16 Canada (7)	3 – 1	Austria (14) 81.92
Player(s)	Legs	Player(s)
John Part	3 – 0	Maik Langendorf
Ken MacNeil	1 – 3	Mensur Suljović
Part & MacNeil	3 – 1	Langendorf & Suljović

==== Group B – 4 December (evening) ====
POS	Team	P	W	L	LF	LA	+/-	PTS	Status
1	Wales (5)	3	2	1	21	16	+5	7	Advance to semi-finals
2	Spain (11)	3	2	1	17	19	–2	7	Advance to semi-finals
3	Scotland (4)	3	1	2	20	18	+2	6	Eliminated
4	United States (8)	3	1	2	17	22	–5	4	Eliminated

Country	Points	Country
84.83 Spain (11)	3 – 1	United States (8) 84.32
Player(s)	Legs	Player(s)
93.31 Carlos Rodríguez	3 – 2	Bill Davis 92.01
80.96 Antonio Alcinas	1 – 3	Darin Young 83.82
79.39 Rodríguez & Alcinas	3 – 1	Davis & Young 76.23

Country	Points	Country
88.38 Wales (5)	3 – 1	Scotland (4) 83.91
Player(s)	Legs	Player(s)
95.94 Mark Webster	3 – 0	Robert Thornton 80.00
86.58 Barrie Bates	2 – 3	Gary Anderson 88.89
85.79 Webster & Bates	3 – 2	Thornton & Anderson 81.00

Country	Points	Country
76.94 Spain (11)	1 – 3	Wales (5) 80.95
Player(s)	Legs	Player(s)
81.85 Carlos Rodríguez	3 – 1	Barrie Bates 77.57
80.82 Antonio Alcinas	1 – 3	Mark Webster 92.40
67.52 Rodríguez & Alcinas	0 – 3	Webster & Bates 72.73

Country	Points	Country
86.58 United States (8)	0 – 4	Scotland (4) 96.20
Player(s)	Legs	Player(s)
82.59 Darin Young	2 – 3	Robert Thornton 84.29
78.00 Bill Davis	0 – 3	Gary Anderson 109.98
96.34 Young & Davis	2 – 3	Thornton & Anderson 102.35

Country	Points	Country
95.08 Spain (11)	3 – 1	Scotland (4) 94.93
Player(s)	Legs	Player(s)
81.40 Carlos Rodríguez	0 – 3	Robert Thornton 100.20
100.38 Antonio Alcinas	3 – 2	Gary Anderson 92.68
99.05 Rodríguez & Alcinas	3 – 1	Thornton & Anderson 93.70

Country	Points	Country
79.72 United States (8)	3 – 1	Wales (5) 87.18
Player(s)	Legs	Player(s)
88.87 Darin Young	3 – 2	Barrie Bates 87.70
70.00 Bill Davis	1 – 3	Mark Webster 98.46
77.53 Young & Davis	3 – 1	Bates & Webster 77.18

=== Semi-finals and final ===
Semi-finals (first to 4 points); 5 December (afternoon)
A1 (2)	Netherlands 95.35	6	6	6	6	4
B2 (11)	Spain 89.49	2	3	4	5	0
B1 (5)	Wales 89.94	6	4	4	3	6	1^{S}	3
A2 (3)	Australia 97.61	5	6	6	6	5	0	3

Final (first to 4 points); 5 December (evening)
A1 (2)	Netherlands 95.10	8	6	6	8	8	3
B1 (5)	Wales 91.40	4	8	8	5	5	2

^{S}The score tied 3–3 after five matches (the doubles match worth 2 points), Wales won the sudden death doubles leg to progress.

==== Semi-finals – Afternoon ====
Country	Points	Country
95.35 Netherlands (2)	4 – 0	Spain (11) 89.49
Player	Legs	Player
103.14 Raymond van Barneveld	6 – 2	Antonio Alcinas 93.80
89.31 Co Stompé	6 – 3	Carlos Rodríguez 82.59
95.75 Raymond van Barneveld	6 – 4	Carlos Rodríguez 89.94
94.92 Co Stompé	6 – 5	Antonio Alcinas 92.64

Country	Points	Country
89.94 Wales (5)	4 – 3	Australia (3) 97.61
Player(s)	Legs	Player(s)
88.17 Mark Webster	6 – 5	Paul Nicholson 96.16
90.45 Barrie Bates	4 – 6	Simon Whitlock 107.77
94.60 Mark Webster	4 – 6	Simon Whitlock 100.36
86.49 Barrie Bates	3 – 6	Paul Nicholson 95.44
87.84 (90.28 incl. s.d.) Webster & Bates	6 – 5	Nicholson & Whitlock 89.70 (91.03 incl. s.d.)

- Webster & Bates won the sudden death doubles leg against the throw to progress to the final.

==== Final – Evening ====
Country	Points	Country
95.10 Netherlands (2)	4 – 2	Wales (5) 91.40
Player(s)	Legs	Player(s)
89.83 Raymond van Barneveld	8 – 4	Barrie Bates 79.27
98.09 Co Stompé	6 – 8	Mark Webster 100.90
100.95 Raymond van Barneveld	6 – 8	Mark Webster 104.11
97.82 Co Stompé	8 – 5	Barrie Bates 89.74
89.36 van Barneveld & Stompé	8 – 5	Webster & Bates 84.67
