= 2022 World Masters (darts) =

World Masters

Tournament information
- Dates: 8–11 December 2022
- Venue: De Bonte Wever
- Location: Assen
- Country: Netherlands
- Organisation(s): WDF
- Format: Legs
- Prize fund: €51,795 (total)
- Winner's share: €10,000 (men's) €5,000 (women's) €500 (boys) €250 (girls)

Champion(s)
- Wesley Plaisier (men's); Beau Greaves (women's); Luke Littler (boys); Paige Pauling (girls)

The 2022 World Masters (officially referred to as the 2022 Winmau World Masters) was the 47th edition of the World Masters, organised by the World Darts Federation. It was held at the De Bonte Wever in Assen, Netherlands.

John O'Shea who won the previous men's tournament was absent from the event, having switched to the Professional Darts Corporation in January 2022. Lisa Ashton as three-time champion did not defend her title.

== Prize money ==
Position	Prize money			
Position	Men	Women	Boys	Girls
Winner	€10,000	€5,000	€500	€250
Runner-up	€5,000	€2,000	€250	€125
Semi-finalist	€2,000	€1,000	€125	€70
Quarter-finalist	€1,000	€500	€70	—
Last 16	€500	€250	—	—
Last 32	€250	€125	—	—
Last 64	€125	—	—	—
Event Totals	€35,000	€15,000	€1,280	€515
Overall Total	€51,795			

== Men's ==
=== Format and seeds ===
All competitors was start the tournament in the first-round group-stage on 8 December 2022. Group sizes were determined by the total number of registered entries prior to the draw. There will be 64 seeded players in men’s competition. Seedings were based on the main WDF World Rankings on 28 November 2022. The top two players in each group progressed to the second round. At start of the tournament, seeds are as follows.

1. Jelle Klaasen
2. Neil Duff
3. James Hurrell (group stage)
4. Andy Baetens
5. Chris Landman
6. Mark Barilli
7. Luke Littler
8. Danny Lauby
9. Thibault Tricole (group stage)
10. Alexander Merkx
11. Darren Johnson
12. James Richardson
13. Moreno Blom (group stage)
14. Antony Allen
15. Martyn Turner
16. Richard Veenstra
17. Nick Kenny
18. Kai Fan Leung
19. Benjamin Pratnemer (group stage)
20. Mike Gillet
21. Dennie Olde Kalter
22. David Kirwan
23. Jordan Brooks
24. Aaron Turner
25. Jonny Tata
26. Gary Stone
27. Barry Copeland
28. Shaun McDonald
29. James Beeton
30. Jim Widmayer
31. John Scott
32. Ben Hazel
33. Greg Ritchie
34. Sebastian Białecki (second round)
35. Paul Lim
36. Ricky Nauman
37. Wesley Plaisier (champion)
38. Leonard Gates
39. Lee Williams (group stage)
40. Paul Mitchell (group stage)
41. Shaun Griffiths (group stage)
42. Andreas Harrysson
43. Sebastian Steyer (second round)
44. Kevin Luke
45. Johan van Velzen (group stage)
46. Henrik Sjöberg
47. Thomas Junghans (group stage)
48. Dalibor Šmolík (group stage)
49. John Desreumaux
50. Ivo Leeksma
51. Mitsuhiko Tatsunami
52. Francesco Raschini
53. Robbie Knops
54. Jacques Labre
55. Philip van Gasse (group stage)
56. Brian Løkken (group stage)
57. József Rucska (group stage)
58. András Borbély (group stage)
59. Ryan de Vreede
60. Bruce Robbins (group stage)
61. Dustin Holt (group stage)
62. Evander Stevenson
63. Niels Jörgen Hansen (group stage)
64. Vítězslav Sedlák

=== Draw ===
Fourth round (best of 9 legs); 9 December
Vítězslav Sedlák 89.85	5
Ricardo Perez 68.03	1
Richard Veenstra 82.76	4
Nick Kenny 82.45	5
Danny Lauby 94.36	5
Gary Stone 92.72	2
Martijn Dragt 79.86	5
Tonny Veenhof 78.46	3
Andy Baetens 89.01	4
Davy Proosten 89.77	5
Ralph Polderman 82.88	5
Jurjen van der Velde 80.85	2
Chris Landman 89.15	4
Wesley Plaisier 87.46	5
Christian Gödl 94.03	5
Kevin Luke 86.55	1
Jelle Klaasen 92.78	5
Greg Ritchie 80.84	0
Ivo Leeksma 86.51	1
Kai Fan Leung 94.66	5
Davyd Venken 96.86	2
Owen Roelofs 100.91	5
Alexander Merkx 92.94	5
Roemer Mooijman 75.53	1
Kay Smeets 80.66	5
Jim Widmayer 82.75	3
Antony Allen 85.50	5
Christian Kist 96.09	2
Daniel Zygla 87.05	3
Barry Copeland 85.74	5
Jacques Labre 83.09	5
Johan Engström 85.93	3

Fifth round (best of 9 legs); 9 December
Vítězslav Sedlák 81.90	3
Nick Kenny 76.21	5
Danny Lauby 86.84	5
Martijn Dragt 85.14	2
Davy Proosten 87.24	5
Ralph Polderman 71.11	1
Wesley Plaisier 89.33	5
Christian Gödl 85.47	1
Jelle Klaasen 88.75	3
Kai Fan Leung 95.10	5
Owen Roelofs 78.43	5
Alexander Merkx 71.02	2
Kay Smeets 89.13	5
Antony Allen 86.70	3
Barry Copeland 89.58	5
Jacques Labre 83.15	1

Quarter-finals (best of 9 legs); 11 December
Nick Kenny 86.07	2
Danny Lauby 85.14	5
Davy Proosten 84.90	2
Wesley Plaisier 96.03	5
Kai Fan Leung 83.80	5
Owen Roelofs 90.62	2
Kay Smeets 86.57	4
Barry Copeland 84.65	5

Semi-finals (best of 11 legs); 11 December
Danny Lauby 82.48	5
Wesley Plaisier 86.36	6
Kai Fan Leung 84.11	3
Barry Copeland 88.48	6

Final (best of 13 legs); 11 December
Wesley Plaisier 96.27	7
Barry Copeland 95.93	2

== Women's ==
=== Format and seeds ===
All competitors was start the tournament in the first-round group-stage on 8 December 2022. Group sizes weren determined by the total number of registered entries prior to the draw. There will be 32 seeded players in women’s competition. Seedings were based on the main WDF World Rankings on 28 November 2022. The top two players in each group progressed to the second round. At start of the tournament, seeds are as follows.

1. Beau Greaves (champion)
2. Deta Hedman (third round)
3. Aileen de Graaf (second round)
4. Anca Zijlstra (first round)
5. Wendy Harper (quarter-finals)
6. Kirsty Hutchinson (third round)
7. Suzanne Smith (first round)
8. Nicole Regnaud (third round)
9. Aletta Wajer (third round)
10. Jo Clements (first round)
11. Lorraine Hyde (quarter-finals)
12. Priscilla Steenbergen (third round)
13. Anna Forsmark (group stage)
14. Mikuru Suzuki (third round)
15. Tori Kewish (group stage)
16. Jitka Císařová (first round)
17. Margaret Sutton (first round)
18. Natalie Gilbert (semi-finals)
19. Maud Jansson (group stage)
20. Noa-Lynn van Leuven (second round)
21. Cali West (second round)
22. Adriana van Wijgerden (second round)
23. Irina Armstrong (second round)
24. Rachna David (quarter-finals)
25. Denise Cassidy (group stage)
26. Melina van den Kieboom (group stage)
27. Ingibjörg Magnúsdóttir (group stage)
28. Aaja Jalbert (first round)
29. Mayumi Ouchi (semi-finals)
30. Lerena Rietbergen (second round)
31. Christine Hyde (first round)
32. Vanessa Zuidema (group stage)

=== Draw ===
Second round (best of 9 legs); 9 December
1	Beau Greaves 90.54	5
Samantha Piccolo 73.96	0
3	Aileen de Graaf 62.12	1
Sharon Straatsma-Pul 67.62	5
8	Nicole Regnaud 68.49	5
Kasumi Sato 64.68	3
Kaye Hales 63.26	2
24	Rachna David 70.93	5
Yoko Tsukui 73.91	3
29	Mayumi Ouchi 73.91	5
6	Kirsty Hutchinson 70.28	5
20	Noa-Lynn van Leuven 62.46	4
5	Wendy Harper 70.99	5
Yukie Sakaguchi 64.31	1
12	Priscilla Steenbergen 76.60	5
21	Cali West 64.85	2
2	Deta Hedman 70.74	5
Latressa Skrzyniak 63.38	3
Brenda Moreau 57.99	2
18	Natalie Gilbert 67.84	5
9	Aletta Wajer 76.67	5
Kirsi Viinikainen 69.25	2
Stefanie Rennoch 69.00	5
23	Irina Armstrong 74.24	4
Almudena Fajardo 78.11	5
30	Lerena Rietbergen 66.90	1
14	Mikuru Suzuki 77.80	5
Sophie McKinlay 68.74	3
Anneke Houben 52.37	1
Michelle Merlit 52.80	5
11	Lorraine Hyde 71.69	5
22	Adriana van Wijgerden 61.99	1

Third round (best of 9 legs); 9 December
1	Beau Greaves 90.54	5
Sharon Straatsma-Pul 73.96	0
8	Nicole Regnaud 68.70	4
24	Rachna David 71.09	5
29	Mayumi Ouchi 78.28	5
6	Kirsty Hutchinson 69.65	3
5	Wendy Harper 65.25	5
12	Priscilla Steenbergen 62.19	3
2	Deta Hedman 67.13	2
18	Natalie Gilbert 72.17	5
9	Aletta Wajer 74.88	3
Stefanie Rennoch 73.72	5
Almudena Fajardo 77.80	5
14	Mikuru Suzuki 76.02	4
Michelle Merlit 63.88	0
11	Lorraine Hyde 77.47	5

Quarter-finals (best of 9 legs); 9 December
1	Beau Greaves 80.81	5
24	Rachna David 77.28	0
29	Mayumi Ouchi 70.67	5
5	Wendy Harper 70.73	3
18	Natalie Gilbert 73.46	5
Stefanie Rennoch 68.49	4
Almudena Fajardo 71.17	5
11	Lorraine Hyde 64.63	3

Semi-finals (best of 9 legs); 11 December
1	Beau Greaves 83.06	5
29	Mayumi Ouchi 80.84	4
18	Natalie Gilbert 69.20	4
Almudena Fajardo 69.03	5

Final (best of 11 legs); 11 December
1	Beau Greaves 80.52	6
Almudena Fajardo 74.40	0

== Boys ==
=== Format and seeds ===
All competitors was start the tournament in the first-round group-stage on 10 December 2022. Group sizes were determined by the total number of registered entries prior to the draw. There were 16 seeded players in boys competition. Seedings was based on the main WDF World Rankings on 28 November 2022. The top two players in each group shall progress to the second round. At start of the tournament, seeds are as follows.

1. Luke Littler (champion)
2. András Borbély (quarter-finals)
3. Peter Stewart (runner-up)
4. Dylan van Lierop (fourth round)
5. Matyáš Rejhon (semi-finals)
6. Tinus van Tiel (second round)
7. Ondřej Skalický (third round)
8. Enrico Frank (group stage)
9. Mats Theobald (second round)
10. Jimmy Fitzsimmons (group stage)
11. Lukas Jensen (second round)
12. Robin Stegler (group stage)
13. Sean McKeon (quarter-finals)
14. Dominik Kočik (second round)
15. Zac Tabb (group stage)
16. Yorik Hofkens (fourth round)

=== Draw ===
Third round (best of 7 legs); 10 December
Luke Littler 88.93	4
Alexander Steinmetz 76.47	2
Yorik Hofkens 82.36	4
Pim van Bijnen 65.35
Fabian Tapner 80.16	4
Ieuan Halsall 79.58
András Borbély 67.83	4
Leighton Bennett 61.49
Dylan van Lierop 72.62	4
Ondřej Skalický 58.03
Sean McKeon 66.28	4
Seppe Dasseville 66.26
Matyáš Rejhon 76.10	4
Wassim Dghoughi 49.69
Bailey Day 63.33	4
Zoltan Polonyi 64.10
Bradley van der Velden 76.10	4
Lucas Nitsche 59.92
Adam Dee 73.26	4
Eloy de la Viuda 66.64
Caspar Gruß 65.71	4
Niklas Klasila 59.46	1
Mitchell McCarthy 66.69	4
Johnny Stewart 63.57
Peter Stewart 83.86	4
Mats Theobald 80.57
Nathan Osmond 69.27	4
Sydnee de Vries 66.56
Kilian Perales 68.83	4
Georg Harucksteiner 67.05
Kieran Thompson 77.05	4
Peyton Hammond 70.83

Fourth round (best of 7 legs); 10 December
Luke Littler 79.04	4
Yorik Hofkens 72.82	1
Fabian Tapner 85.56
András Borbély 80.97	4
Dylan van Lierop 70.06
Sean McKeon 63.63	4
Matyáš Rejhon 72.43	4
Bailey Day 62.81
Bradley van der Velden 74.87	4
Adam Dee 73.83
Caspar Gruß 76.49	4
Mitchell McCarthy 68.59
Peter Stewart 67.55	4
Nathan Osmond 64.48
Kilian Perales 91.35
Kieran Thompson 88.20	4

Quarter-finals (best of 7 legs); 11 December
Luke Littler 90.74	4
András Borbély 85.73	3
Sean McKeon 59.92	0
Matyáš Rejhon 81.24	4
Bradley van der Velden 87.67	4
Caspar Gruß 70.31	2
Peter Stewart 80.39	4
Kieran Thompson 89.15

Semi-finals (best of 9 legs); 11 December
Luke Littler 78.28	5
Matyáš Rejhon 70.48	0
Bradley van der Velden 74.48	1
Peter Stewart 76.81	5

Final (best of 11 legs); 11 December
Luke Littler 90.06	6
Peter Stewart 82.73	4

== Girls ==
=== Format and seeds ===
All competitors was start the tournament in the first-round group-stage on 10 December 2022. Group sizes were determined by the total number of registered entries prior to the draw. There were 8 seeded players in girls competition. Seedings was based on the main WDF World Rankings on 28 November 2022. The top two players in each group shall progress to the second round. At start of the tournament, seeds are as follows.

1. Jana Leys (quarter-finals)
2. Paige Pauling (champion)
3. Krisztina Turai (quarter-finals)
4. Amy Evans (second round)
5. Aurora Fochesato (quarter-finals)
6. Sophie McKinlay (semi-finals)
7. Rebecca Allen (group stage)
8. Kyenta Ysewijn (group stage)

=== Draw ===
Second round (best of 7 legs); 11 December
Iida Lanko 64.87	4
Kylie Chapman 46.63	1
Layla Elansary 43.18	4
Dorina Sipos 43.21	2
Lauren Stokoe 55.16	4
4	Amy Evans 46.06	0
5	Aurora Fochesato 56.34	4
Abbie Brewster 42.42	2
2	Paige Pauling 57.60	4
Abigail Harty 53.23	1
1	Jana Leys 57.65	4
Jessica Wendl 44.91	1
3	Krisztina Turai 51.41	4
Chantal Tessin 47.52	1
6	Sophie McKinlay 49.69	4
Daphne Camijn 43.73	0

Quarter-finals (best of 7 legs); 11 December
Iida Lanko 54.16	4
Layla Elansary 44.06	0
Lauren Stokoe 57.19	4
5	Aurora Fochesato 59.10	2
2	Paige Pauling 63.26	4
1	Jana Leys 62.31	3
3	Krisztina Turai 56.61	1
6	Sophie McKinlay 59.17	4

Semi-finals (best of 7 legs); 11 December
Iida Lanko 61.98	4
Lauren Stokoe 59.34	0
2	Paige Pauling 72.27	4
Sophie McKinlay 66.92	3

Final (best of 9 legs); 11 December
Iida Lanko 67.89	2
2	Paige Pauling 71.42	5
