= Almudena Fajardo =

Spanish darts player

Personal information
- Full name: Almudena Fajardo Ayuso
- Born: 11 August 1996 (age 30) Spain
- Home town: Hellín, Castilla-La Mancha, Spain

Sport
- Sport: Darts
- Laterality: Right-handed

Organisation (see split in darts)
- PDC: 2023–
- WDF: 2022–
- Current world ranking: (WDF W) NR (17 August 2026)

WDF major events – best performances
- World Championship: Last 24: 2023
- World Masters: Runner Up: 2022

Other achievements
- 2022 Became the first silver medalist of the WDF Europe Cup coming from Spain.; 2022 Became the first women from Spain who qualified for the WDF World Darts Championship.
Medal record
Women's Darts
Representing Spain
WDF Europe Cup
Silver medal – second place	2022 Gandía	Women's singles
EDU European Ch'ship
Gold medal – first place	2022 Benidorm	Women's cricket
Gold medal – first place	2023 Benidorm	Women's cricket
Silver medal – second place	2022 Benidorm	Women's singles
Bronze medal – third place	2017 Caorle	Women's singles
Bronze medal – third place	2017 Caorle	Women's cricket
Bronze medal – third place	2018 Caorle	Women's cricket
Bronze medal – third place	2023 Benidorm	Women's singles

Almudena Fajardo Ayuso (born 11 August 1996) is a Spanish female professional soft-tip and steel-tip darts player who currently plays in the World Darts Federation (WDF) events. She is a two-time EDU European Darts Champion and first Spanish female player who played in the final of the WDF Europe Cup competition. She was qualified for the 2023 WDF World Darts Championship.

== Career ==
Fajardo is one of the most successful players from Spain. In 2017, she won two bronze medals in singles and cricket competition at the EDU European Darts Championship in Caorle. A year later, she repeated her success in the cricket competition. In subsequent international competitions, she maintained a good level, however, she was more successful only in the national competitions. In 2022, she was advanced to the EDU European Darts Championship finals for the first time and won her first gold medal in cricket competition, defeated Josipa Brzić. In the singles competition, she lost to Lucia Jankovská in the final.

At the end of September 2022, she was selected by the national federation to participate in the 2022 WDF Europe Cup held in her country. This is her first international competition on the steel-tip darts organised by World Darts Federation. On the second day of the tournament, she advanced to the finals of the singles competition, defeating the favorites Deta Hedman, Monique Lessmeister and Veronika Ihász. In the final, she lost to Beau Greaves by 4–7 in legs and winning the first medal for Spain.

In late February 2023, Fajardo made her debut in the 2023 PDC Women's Series.

== World Championship results ==
=== WDF ===
- 2023: First round (lost to Paula Murphy 1–2)

== Performance timeline ==
Tournament	2022	2023	2024
WDF Ranked televised events
World Championship	DNQ	1R	DNQ
World Masters	RU	NH	3R

== Career finals ==
=== WDF major finals: 2 (2 runners-up) ===
Legend
World Masters (0 – 1)
WDF Europe Cup (0 – 1)

Outcome	No.	Year	Championship	Opponent in the final	Score
Runner-up	1.	2022	WDF Europe Cup	Beau Greaves	4 – 7 (l)
Runner-up	2.	2022	World Masters	Beau Greaves	0 – 6 (l)
