= EDU European Darts Championship =

European Darts Championship

Tournament information
- Venue: Various
- Location: Various
- Country: Europe
- Established: 1996
- Organisation(s): EDU
- Format: Legs

Current champion(s)
- Classic; Ricardo Perez (men's); Lucia Jankovská (women's); Cricket; Kai Gotthardt (men's); Almudena Fajardo (women's)

The EDU European Darts Championship is an electronic soft-tip darts tournament held at various locations in Europe. First edition of this tournament took place in 1996 at the Brig venue in Switzerland. Championship tournaments are organized together with many other open-level tournaments in one week.

The most successful player at this tournament is Boris Krčmar from Croatia.

== Classic tournaments ==
=== Men's singles ===
Year	Location	Medals			Details
Year	Location	Gold	Silver	Bronze	Details
1999	(Czech Republic) Brno	(Austria) Thomas Klocker	(Croatia) Goran Protega	(Switzerland) Philipp Ruckstuhl	
2000	(Italy) Riccione	Mensur Suljović	(Poland) Adam Skalski	(Croatia) Vedran Dukić	
2001	(Croatia) Poreč	(Spain) José Rodríguez	(Austria) Alex Steinbauer	(Croatia) Goran Protega	
2002	(Austria) St. Johann	(Austria) Dietmar Burger	Krzysztof Ratajski	(Slovakia) Peter Martin	
2003	(Spain) Salou	Mensur Suljović (2)	(Spain) Francisco Saez	(Slovakia) Peter Martin	
2004	(Germany) Hamburg	Mensur Suljović (3)	(Germany) DJ Westermann	Krzysztof Ratajski	
2005	(Hungary) Sopron	Mensur Suljović (4)	(Germany) Thomas Kreutzer	(Switzerland) Darek Kolatorski	
2006	(Croatia) Umag	(Croatia) Goran Protega	Krzysztof Ratajski	Krzysztof Kciuk	
2007	(Czech Republic) Prague	(Czech Republic) Ondřej Plšek	(Italy) Patrick Susanna	Oliver Ferenc	
2008	(Italy) Caorle	Krzysztof Ratajski	Mensur Suljović	(Czech Republic) Robert Kuric	
2009	(Croatia) Zadar	Boris Krčmar	(Poland) Krzysztof Wojciechowski	(Czech Republic) Ondřej Plšek	
2010	(Switzerland) Leukerbad	Boris Krčmar (2)	Thomas Junghans	(Croatia) Vladimir Lesič	
2011	(Spain) Benidorm	(Serbia) Aleksandar Borič	Alex Fehlmann	(Czech Republic) Martin Kapucián	
2012	(Turkey) Antalya	Boris Krčmar (3)	(Germany) Karsten Bott	(Russia) Sergej Tšivčik	
2013	(Germany) Geiselwind	François Schweyen	Boris Krčmar	(Austria) Rene Rapp	
2014	(Croatia) Poreč	Boris Krčmar (4)	(Slovenia) Mitja Habijan	Karel Sedláček	
2015	(Croatia) Poreč	János Végső	(Czech Republic) Martin Hoffmann	(Czech Republic) Zdeněk Lacina	
2016	(Croatia) Poreč	Max Hopp	Boris Krčmar	Karel Sedláček	
2017	(Italy) Caorle	(Croatia) Dean Biskupič	(Italy) Stefano Barbi	(Austria) Anton Pein	
2018	(Italy) Caorle	Pavel Drtíl	(Germany) El Abbas El Amri	(Germany) Sascha Stein	
2019	(Italy) Caorle	(Germany) El Abbas El Amri	(Czech Republic) David Písek	(Germany) Stefan Stoyke	
2022	(Spain) Benidorm	(Croatia) Neven Rešetar	(Czech Republic) Martin Hoffmann	(Austria) Christoph Niederreiter	
2023	(Spain) Benidorm	Ricardo Perez	Ivica Cavric	Alessio Marconi	

=== Women's singles ===
Year	Location	Medals			Details
Year	Location	Gold	Silver	Bronze	Details
1999	(Czech Republic) Brno	(Austria) Steffi Reiter	(Austria) Eva Schiketanz	(Austria) Liza Steinbach	
2000	(Italy) Riccione	(Hungary) Marene Rácz	(Hungary) Adel Urgyan	(Germany) Sylvia Petersen	
2001	(Croatia) Poreč	(Hungary) Marene Rácz (2)	(Hungary) Nora Kautzky	(Czech Republic) Michaela Jackuliaková	
2002	(Austria) St. Johann	(Hungary) Marene Rácz (3)	(Austria) Camelia Hejsek	(Czech Republic) Dagmar Komorová	
2003	(Spain) Salou	(Hungary) Orsolya Bodi	(Germany) Valeska Klein	(Germany) Jana Reimann	
2004	(Germany) Hamburg	(Croatia) Maja Čužič	(Germany) Marena Csepeli	(Czech Republic) Zuzana Štěpánová	
2005	(Hungary) Sopron	(Slovenia) Mojca Humar	(Italy) Daniela Lisetto	(Czech Republic) Blanka Vojtková	
2006	(Croatia) Umag	(Czech Republic) Dagmar Komorová	(Slovakia) Petra Kvasničková	(Austria) Christine Kaufmann	
2007	(Czech Republic) Prague	(Slovenia) Mojca Humar (2)	(Russia) Karina Nagapetyants	(Czech Republic) Markéta Abadžievová	
2008	(Italy) Caorle	(Slovenia) Mojca Humar (3)	(Hungary) Nora Fekete	(Germany) Angelika Galatovic	
2009	(Croatia) Zadar	(Germany) Angelika Galatovic	(Russia) Karina Nagapetyants	(Germany) Janine Wagener	
2010	(Switzerland) Leukerbad	(Germany) Marene Westermann	(Switzerland) Fiona Gaylor	(Switzerland) Kerstin Engbers	
2011	(Spain) Benidorm	Anastasia Dobromyslova	(Russia) Karina Nagapetyants	(Czech Republic) Marta Heřmanová	
2012	(Turkey) Antalya	(Germany) Morena Wolf	(Russia) Karina Nagapetyants	(Switzerland) Colette Rudin	
2013	(Germany) Geiselwind	Anastasia Dobromyslova (2)	(Germany) Marene Westermann	(Czech Republic) Iveta Bruská	
2014	(Croatia) Poreč	(Germany) Angelika Galatovic (2)	Veronika Ihász	(Italy) Laura Ariani	
2015	(Croatia) Poreč	Anastasia Dobromyslova (3)	(Switzerland) Karina Nagapetyants	(Germany) Jana Bormann	
2016	(Croatia) Poreč	(Hungary) Klaudia Horvath	(Austria) Eva Paulusberger	(Czech Republic) Lada Kotlarikova	
2017	(Italy) Caorle	(Switzerland) Karina Nagapetyants	(Turkey) Emine Dursun	(Spain) Almudena Fajardo	
2018	(Italy) Caorle	(Slovenia) Mojca Muzic	(Germany) Silvia Keller	(Italy) Chiara Sarnari	
2019	(Italy) Caorle	(Germany) Silvia Keller	(Slovakia) Dominika Kopkášová	Elena Shulgina	
2022	(Spain) Benidorm	Lucia Jankovská	Almudena Fajardo	Marcela Rajmanová	
2023	(Spain) Benidorm	Lucia Jankovská (2)	Jeannette Stoop	Almudena Fajardo	

== Cricket tournaments ==
=== Men's singles ===
Year	Location	Medals			Details
Year	Location	Gold	Silver	Bronze	Details
2000	(Italy) Riccione	(Croatia) Vedran Dukić	Mensur Suljović	(Germany) Dieter Joss	
2001	(Croatia) Poreč	(Switzerland) Mark Bichsel	(Slovakia) Peter Martin	(Austria) Rainer Sturm	
2002	(Austria) St. Johann	(Croatia) Goran Protega	Krzysztof Ratajski	(Hungary) Béla Balogh	
2003	(Spain) Salou	Krzysztof Ratajski	Mensur Suljović	(Germany) Manfred Bilderl	
2004	(Germany) Hamburg	Mensur Suljović	(Spain) José Rodríguez	(Germany) Manfred Bilderl	
2005	(Hungary) Sopron	Dietmar Burger	Krzysztof Ratajski	(Spain) José Rodríguez	
2006	(Croatia) Umag	Dietmar Burger (2)	Mensur Suljović	Miloslav Navrátil	
2007	(Czech Republic) Prague	(Czech Republic) Martin Hoffmann	Mensur Suljović	Alex Fehlmann	
2008	(Italy) Caorle	Mensur Suljović (2)	Boris Krčmar	(Croatia) Goran Protega	
2010	(Switzerland) Leukerbad	Pavel Drtíl	(Belgium) Kurt van de Rijck	Boris Krčmar	
2014	(Croatia) Poreč	Boris Krčmar	(Czech Republic) Martin Hoffmann	(Spain) Minan Cantenero	
2015	(Croatia) Poreč	Boris Krčmar (2)	(Croatia) Zdravko Antunović	(Austria) Rainer Sturm	
2016	(Croatia) Poreč	Boris Krčmar (3)	(Spain) Daniel Carrasco	Pavel Drtíl	
2017	(Italy) Caorle	Gabriel Clemens	Boris Krčmar	(Croatia) Tino Babic	
2018	(Italy) Caorle	Boris Krčmar (4)	(Croatia) Ivica Cavric	(Czech Republic) Martin Hoffmann	
2019	(Italy) Caorle	(Croatia) Ivica Cavric	(Czech Republic) David Písek	Boris Krčmar	
2022	(Spain) Benidorm	Ricardo Perez	(Croatia) Dragutin Pecnjak	(Czech Republic) Antonín Davídek	
2023	(Spain) Benidorm	Kai Gotthardt	Ivica Cavric	Karel Poklop	

=== Women's singles ===
Year	Location	Medals			Details
Year	Location	Gold	Silver	Bronze	Details
2000	(Italy) Riccione	(Hungary) Marene Rácz	(Slovakia) Zuzana Raczová	(Italy) Linda Tamini	
2001	(Croatia) Poreč	(Hungary) Marene Rácz (2)	(Switzerland) Denise Winter	(Hungary) Nora Kautzky	
2002	(Austria) St. Johann	(Hungary) Marene Rácz (3)	(Germany) Agi Weichenegger	(Germany) Jana Reimann	
2003	(Spain) Salou	(Hungary) Orsolya Bodi	(Spain) Mila Martinez	(Spain) Rosi Gonzales	
2004	(Germany) Hamburg	(Hungary) Eszter Kalay	(Czech Republic) Zuzana Štěpánová	(Germany) Anna Maria Michael	
2005	(Hungary) Sopron	(Slovenia) Mojca Humar	(Croatia) Ivana Čavar	(Hungary) Nóra Fekete	
2006	(Croatia) Umag	(Slovenia) Mojca Humar (2)	(Germany) Marene Csepeli	(Czech Republic) Dagmar Komorová	
2007	(Czech Republic) Prague	(Slovenia) Mojca Humar (3)	(Czech Republic) Dagmar Komorová	(Spain) Mila Martinez	
2008	(Italy) Caorle	(Slovenia) Mojca Humar (4)	(Germany) Angelika Galatovic	(Germany) Marene Csepeli	
2010	(Switzerland) Leukerbad	(Russia) Karina Nagapetyants	(Belgium) Patricia De Peuter	(Switzerland) Fiona Gaylor	
2014	(Croatia) Poreč	(Germany) Stefanie Richter	(Slovakia) Martina Vidová	(Italy) Denise Bonafini	
2016	(Croatia) Poreč	(Austria) Eva Paulusberger	(Switzerland) Karina Nagapetyants	Veronika Ihász	
2017	(Italy) Caorle	(Switzerland) Karina Nagapetyants	(Germany) Marene Westermann	(Spain) Almudena Fajardo	
2018	(Italy) Caorle	(Italy) Giulia Bernardelli	(Czech Republic) Blanka Vojtková	(Spain) Almudena Fajardo	
2019	(Italy) Caorle	(Slovakia) Dominika Kopkášová	(Czech Republic) Lada Knapová	(Czech Republic) Blanka Vojtková	
2022	(Spain) Benidorm	Almudena Fajardo	(Croatia) Josipa Brzić	(Slovakia) Martina Sulovská	
2023	(Spain) Benidorm	Almudena Fajardo (2)	Angelika Galatovic	Carina Zelt	
