= Peter Martin (darts player) =

Slovak darts player

Personal information
- Full name: Peter Martin
- Born: 10 February 1975 (age 51) Zvolen, Czechoslovakia
- Home town: Zvolen, Slovakia

Sport
- Sport: Darts
- Playing since: 2000
- Darts: 23g
- Laterality: Right-handed
- Walk-on music: "He's The Man" by Heavens Gate

Organisation (see split in darts)
- BDO: 2000–2015
- PDC: 2009–2018
- WDF: 2000–2015

WDF major events – best performances
- World Masters: Last 128: 2010

Other tournament wins
- Years
| FECS European Ch'ship | 2011 |
Medal record
Men's Darts
Representing Slovakia
IDF World Ch'ship
| Silver medal – second place | 2009 Zagreb | Men's singles |
EDU European Ch'ship
| Silver medal – second place | 2001 Poreč | Men's cricket |
| Bronze medal – third place | 2002 St. Johann | Men's singles |
| Bronze medal – third place | 2003 Salou | Men's singles |

Peter Martin (born 10 February 1975) is a Slovak former professional darts player who has played in the World Darts Federation (WDF) and Professional Darts Corporation (PDC) events. He represented Slovakia at the 2010 PDC World Cup of Darts.

== Career ==
In 2010, Martin represented Slovakia at the 2010 PDC World Cup of Darts, teaming up with Oto Zmelik. They lost 6–3 in the first round of the tournament playing against the Irish pair (Mick McGowan and William O'Connor). They averaged 74.90.

In 2011, he lost to Joe Murnan in the final round of the Romanian Open.

He qualified for the 2013 Austrian Darts Open where he were to play against Mervyn King in the first round. However, Martin withdrew from the event as he couldn't show up in time giving King a walkover.

Martin attended at the PDC Qualifying School in 2011, 2013, 2016 and 2018.

== Performance timeline ==
| Tournament | 2010 |
|---|---|
WDF Ranked televised events
| World Masters | 2R |
