= Miloslav Navrátil =

Czech darts player

Personal information
- Nickname: "Sláva"
- Born: 25 February 1958 (age 68) Milevsko, Czechoslovakia
- Home town: Milevsko, Czech Republic

Sport
- Sport: Darts
- Playing since: 1980
- Darts: 21g Bull's
- Laterality: Right-handed
- Walk-on music: "Být stále mlád" by Karel Gott

Organisation (see split in darts)
- BDO: 2005–2007
- PDC: 2007–

WDF major events – best performances
- World Masters: Last 384: 2006

PDC premier events – best performances
- World Championship: Last 64: 2008

Other tournament wins
- Years
PDC East Europe Qualifier	2007
Medal record
Men's Darts
Representing Czech Republic
EDU European Ch'ship
Bronze medal – third place	2006 Umag	Men's cricket

Miloslav Navrátil (born 25 February 1958) is a Czech professional darts player who plays in Professional Darts Corporation (PDC) events.

Navrátil won the 2007 PDC World East European Qualifying Event beating fellow countryman Petr Tous in the final. It earned him a place in the 2008 PDC World Darts Championship. He defeated Filipino Rizal Barellano 5-0 in the preliminary round and faced Andy Jenkins in the first round, eventually losing 3-2. He earned £4,000 for his efforts, but since then he has only managed to earn £325 over nine tournaments. He failed to qualify for the inaugural European Darts Championship and also failed to qualify for the 2009 PDC World Darts Championship.
