= 2016 European Darts Trophy =

European dart sports competitive event

Tournament information
- Dates: 9–11 September 2016
- Venue: RWE-Sporthalle
- Location: Mülheim, Germany
- Organisation(s): Professional Darts Corporation (PDC)
- Format: Legs
- Prize fund: £115,000
- Winner's share: £25,000
- High checkout: 161 Mensur Suljović

Champion(s)
- Michael van Gerwen (NED)

The 2016 European Darts Trophy was the eighth of ten PDC European Tour events on the 2016 PDC Pro Tour. The tournament took place at the RWE-Sporthalle in Mülheim, Germany, from 9 to 11 September 2016. It featured a field of 48 players and £115,000 in prize money, with £25,000 going to the winner.

Michael Smith was the defending champion, but he lost 6–5 to James Wade in the quarter-finals.

Michael van Gerwen won the title after defeating Mensur Suljović 6–5 in the final.

== Prize money ==
The prize money of the European Tour events stays the same as last year.

Stage (num. of players)		Prize money
Winner	(1)	£25,000
Runner-up	(1)	£10,000
Semi-finalists	(2)	£5,000
Quarter-finalists	(4)	£3,500
Third round losers	(8)	£2,000
Second round losers	(16)	£1,500
First round losers	(16)	£1,000
Total	£115,000	

== Qualification and format ==
The top 16 players from the PDC ProTour Order of Merit on 22 June automatically qualified for the event and were seeded in the second round. The remaining 32 places went to players from three qualifying events - 20 from the UK Qualifier (held in Barnsley on 1 July), eight from the European Qualifier on 1 September and four from the Host Nation Qualifier on 8 September.

(Northern Ireland) Daryl Gurney who had to withdraw from last week's event due to a broken finger on his throwing hand has pulled out of this event after failing to recover.

The following players took part in the tournament:

Top 16
1. (Netherlands) Michael van Gerwen (winner)
2. (Scotland) Peter Wright (quarter-finals)
3. (England) James Wade (semi-finals)
4. (Belgium) Kim Huybrechts (semi-finals)
5. (England) Dave Chisnall (third round)
6. (England) Michael Smith (quarter-finals)
7. (England) Ian White (third round)
8. (Netherlands) Benito van de Pas (third round)
9. (Netherlands) Jelle Klaasen (quarter-finals)
10. (Austria) Mensur Suljović (runner-up)
11. (Scotland) Robert Thornton (third round)
12. (Wales) Gerwyn Price (quarter-finals)
13. (England) Terry Jenkins (third round)
14. (England) Alan Norris (second round)
15. (England) Stephen Bunting (second round)
16. (Australia) Simon Whitlock (third round)

UK Qualifier
- (Northern Ireland) ~~Daryl Gurney~~ (withdrew)
- (England) Mervyn King (first round)
- (England) Joe Cullen (third round)
- (England) Justin Pipe (second round)
- (England) Joe Murnan (first round)
- (England) Ritchie Edhouse (first round)
- (England) Josh Payne (second round)
- (England) Jamie Caven (second round)
- (Australia) Kyle Anderson (second round)
- (England) Keegan Brown (second round)
- (England) Simon Stevenson (first round)
- (England) Andy Jenkins (third round)
- (England) Robbie Green (first round)
- (Wales) Jamie Lewis (first round)
- (England) Matthew Dennant (first round)
- (England) Ricky Evans (second round)
- (South Africa) Devon Petersen (second round)
- (England) Andy Smith (second round)
- (England) Darren Webster (first round)
- (England) Steve West (first round)

European Qualifier
- (Belgium) Dimitri Van den Bergh (second round)
- (Spain) Cristo Reyes (first round)
- (Hungary) János Végső (first round)
- (Austria) Zoran Lerchbacher (second round)
- (Netherlands) Jermaine Wattimena (second round)
- (Netherlands) Vincent Kamphuis (second round)
- (Belgium) Ronny Huybrechts (first round)
- (Netherlands) Vincent van der Voort (second round)

Host Nation Qualifier
- (Germany) Max Hopp (first round)
- (Germany) Jyhan Artut (first round)
- (Germany) Kevin Münch (first round)
- (Germany) Martin Schindler (second round)
- (Germany) Justin Webers (first round)

== Draw ==
First round (best of 11 legs); 9 September
(England) Keegan Brown 74.56	6
(Germany) Justin Webers 66.97	1
(England) Ricky Evans 86.19	6
(Germany) Jyhan Artut 77.00	1
(Spain) Cristo Reyes 87.32	4
(England) Josh Payne 87.25	6
(Netherlands) Vincent van der Voort 95.53	6
(Germany) Max Hopp 76.09	1
(England) Jamie Caven 88.02	6
(Germany) Kevin Münch 85.14	5
(Netherlands) Jermaine Wattimena 85.90	6
(England) Simon Stevenson 85.52	4
(Australia) Kyle Anderson 94.93	6
(England) Darren Webster 86.87	0
(England) Joe Murnan 87.69	2
(Austria) Zoran Lerchbacher 94.55	6
(England) Robbie Green 91.63	1
(England) Andy Smith 98.66	6
(Wales) Jamie Lewis 91.89	5
(England) Joe Cullen 93.35	6
(South Africa) Devon Petersen 81.31	6
(England) Matthew Dennant 80.51	5
(Belgium) Ronny Huybrechts 92.10	5
(Netherlands) Vincent Kamphuis 93.25	6
(England) Mervyn King 86.31	3
(Belgium) Dimitri Van den Bergh 93.24	6
(Germany) Martin Schindler 88.07	6
(Hungary) János Végső 86.76	3
(England) Justin Pipe 84.03	6
(England) Ritchie Edhouse 87.74	1
(England) Steve West 91.37	3
(England) Andy Jenkins 90.77	6

Second round (best of 11 legs); 10 September
1	(Netherlands) Michael van Gerwen 99.99	6
(England) Keegan Brown 93.62	2
16	(Australia) Simon Whitlock 98.11	6
(England) Ricky Evans 98.86	5
8	(Netherlands) Benito van de Pas 88.01	6
(England) Josh Payne 86.84	2
9	(Netherlands) Jelle Klaasen 111.23	6
(Netherlands) Vincent van der Voort 86.90	1
5	(England) Dave Chisnall 98.71	6
(England) Jamie Caven 96.14	5
12	(Wales) Gerwyn Price 84.30	6
(Netherlands) Jermaine Wattimena 81.70	2
4	(Belgium) Kim Huybrechts 106.09	6
(Australia) Kyle Anderson 89.07	0
13	(England) Terry Jenkins 86.87	6
(Austria) Zoran Lerchbacher 78.69	5
2	(Scotland) Peter Wright 101.33	6
(England) Andy Smith 82.96	0
15	(England) Stephen Bunting 98.50	4
(England) Joe Cullen 99.60	6
7	(England) Ian White 86.20	6
(South Africa) Devon Petersen 86.98	5
10	(Austria) Mensur Suljović 92.02	6
(Netherlands) Vincent Kamphuis 84.68	0
6	(England) Michael Smith 100.20	6
(Belgium) Dimitri Van den Bergh 82.97	0
11	(Scotland) Robert Thornton 88.34	6
(Germany) Martin Schindler 78.93	5
3	(England) James Wade 91.61	6
(England) Justin Pipe 89.16	5
14	(England) Alan Norris 85.03	5
(England) Andy Jenkins 88.08	6

Third round (best of 11 legs); 11 September
1	(Netherlands) van Gerwen 91.86	6
16	(Australia) Whitlock 87.60	3
8	(Netherlands) van de Pas 101.34	5
9	(Netherlands) Klaasen 106.68	6
5	(England) Chisnall 100.90	3
12	(Wales) Price 98.22	6
4	(Belgium) K. Huybrechts 89.27	6
13	(England) T. Jenkins 85.89	5
2	(Scotland) Wright 88.85	6
(England) Cullen 93.02	5
7	(England) White 104.56	3
10	(Austria) Suljović 103.39	6
6	(England) M. Smith 100.91	6
11	(Scotland) Thornton 97.12	4
3	(England) Wade 98.01	6
(England) A. Jenkins 88.03	3

Quarter-finals (best of 11 legs); 11 September
1	(Netherlands) van Gerwen 115.13	6
9	(Netherlands) Klaasen 107.11	2
12	(Wales) Price 94.97	4
4	(Belgium) K. Huybrechts 97.73	6
2	(Scotland) Wright 92.67	1
10	(Austria) Suljović 99.17	6
6	(England) M. Smith 92.14	5
3	(England) Wade 100.54	6

Semi-finals (best of 11 legs); 11 September
1	(Netherlands) van Gerwen 97.57	6
4	(Belgium) K. Huybrechts 93.46	5
10	(Austria) Suljović 100.81	6
3	(England) Wade 100.52	3

Final (best of 11 legs); 11 September
1	(Netherlands) van Gerwen 106.77	6
10	(Austria) Suljović 101.26	5
