= János Végső =

Hungarian darts player

Personal information
- Born: December 1, 1990 (age 35) Budapest, Hungary
- Home town: Budapest

Sport
- Sport: Darts
- Darts: 22g Glen Durrant
- Laterality: Right-handed
- Walk-on music: "Rock This Party" by Bob Sinclar

Organisation (see split in darts)
- BDO: 2010–2016
- PDC: 2016–2019, 2022
- WDF: 2020–

Other tournament wins
- Years
Hungarian Classic	2019
Medal record
Men's Darts
Representing Hungary
IDF World Ch'ship
Silver medal – second place	2011 Benidorm	Men's singles
EDU European Ch'ship
Gold medal – first place	2015 Poreč	Men's singles

János Végső (born 1 December 1990) is a Hungarian darts player who plays in Professional Darts Corporation events.

In 2016, he made his PDC European Tour debut at the 2016 European Darts Trophy and the 2016 German Darts Championship, losing in the first round to Martin Schindler and Darren Johnson respectively.

In 2017, he made his television debut in the 2017 PDC World Cup of Darts, partnering Zoltán Mester, but they lost in the first round to John Part and John Norman Jnr of Canada. In 2019, he returned to the World Cup with his new partner Pál Székely, but they again lost in the first round, this time to Max Hopp and Martin Schindler of Germany.
