= Ondřej Plšek =

Czech darts player

Personal information
- Nickname: "Šakal"
- Born: 8 January 1981 (age 45) Vsetín, Czechoslovakia
- Home town: Vsetín, Czech Republic

Sport
- Sport: Darts
- Playing since: 2008
- Laterality: Right-handed
- Walk-on music: "We're Not Gonna Take It" by Twisted Sister

Organisation (see split in darts)
- PDC: 2019–
Medal record
Men's Darts
Representing Czech Republic
EDU European Ch'ship
Gold medal – first place	2007 Prague	Men's singles
Bronze medal – third place	2009 Zadar	Men's singles

Ondřej Plšek (born 8 January 1981) is a Czech professional darts player who plays in Professional Darts Corporation (PDC) events.

Plšek qualified for his first PDC European Tour tournament in 2019, when he qualified for the 2019 Czech Darts Open, but he lost in the first round to Keegan Brown without winning a single leg.
