= 2019 Czech Darts Open =

Tournament information
- Dates: 28–30 June 2019
- Venue: PVA Expo Praha
- Location: Prague
- Country: Czech Republic
- Organisation(s): PDC
- Format: Legs
- Prize fund: £140,000
- Winner's share: £25,000
- Nine-dart finish: (Wales) Gerwyn Price
- High checkout: 170 (Netherlands) Danny Noppert (England) Mervyn King

Champion(s)
- (England) Jamie Hughes

The 2019 Czech Darts Open was the ninth of thirteen PDC European Tour events on the 2019 PDC Pro Tour. The tournament took place at the PVA Expo Praha, Prague, Czech Republic, from 28 to 30 June 2019. It featured a field of 48 players and £140,000 in prize money, with £25,000 going to the winner.

Jamie Hughes won his first PDC title with an 8–3 win over Stephen Bunting in the final.

Gerwyn Price hit the fourth nine-dart finish of the 2019 European Tour to beat Glen Durrant 6–4 in the second round. It was also the first of Price's career.

The tournament saw a new European tour record for the most seeded players losing their first match as 11 of 16 players including Michael van Gerwen and Peter Wright lost in the second round. The previous record was set by the 2017 Dutch Darts Masters which involved 9 seeds being eliminated.

It was the first ever PDC tournament held in the Czech Republic.

== Prize money ==
This is how the prize money is divided:

Stage (num. of players)		Prize money
Winner	(1)	£25,000
Runner-up	(1)	£10,000
Semi-finalists	(2)	£6,500
Quarter-finalists	(4)	£5,000
Third round losers	(8)	£3,000
Second round losers	(16)	£2,000*
First round losers	(16)	£1,000
Total	£140,000	

- Seeded players who lose in the second round do not receive this prize money on any Orders of Merit.

== Qualification and format ==
The top 16 entrants from the PDC Pro Tour Order of Merit on 11 June will automatically qualify for the event and will be seeded in the second round.

The remaining 32 places will go to players from six qualifying events – 18 from the UK Tour Card Holder Qualifier (held on 21 June), six from the European Tour Card Holder Qualifier (held on 21 June), two from the West & South European Associate Member Qualifier (held on 19 May), four from the Host Nation Qualifier (held on 27 June), one from the Nordic & Baltic Qualifier (held on 8 March), and one from the East European Qualifier (held on 27 June).

From 2019, the Host Nation, Nordic & Baltic and East European Qualifiers will only be available to non-Tour Card holders. Any Tour Card holders from the applicable regions will have to play the main European Qualifier.

The following players will take part in the tournament:

Top 16

1. (Netherlands) Michael van Gerwen (second round)
2. (England) Ian White (quarter-finals)
3. (Wales) Gerwyn Price (third round)
4. (Northern Ireland) Daryl Gurney (quarter-finals)
5. (Scotland) Peter Wright (second round)
6. (England) James Wade (second round)
7. (England) Adrian Lewis (second round)
8. (Austria) Mensur Suljović (quarter-finals)
9. (England) Ricky Evans (second round)
10. (England) Steve Beaton (second round)
11. (England) Michael Smith (second round)
12. (England) Joe Cullen (second round)
13. (Wales) Jonny Clayton (second round)
14. (Australia) Simon Whitlock (semi-finals)
15. (England) Nathan Aspinall (second round)
16. (England) Darren Webster (second round)

UK Qualifier
- (England) Glen Durrant (second round)
- (England) Mervyn King (quarter-finals)
- (England) Stephen Bunting (runner-up)
- (England) Chris Dobey (third round)
- (Scotland) John Henderson (second round)
- (Republic of Ireland) William O'Connor (second round)
- (England) Andrew Gilding (third round)
- (England) Keegan Brown (semi-finals)
- (England) Steve West (first round)
- (England) Ted Evetts (third round)
- (Australia) Corey Cadby (third round)
- (South Africa) Devon Petersen (first round)
- (England) Justin Pipe (second round)
- (England) Kevin Garcia (first round)
- (England) Jamie Hughes (champion)
- (Scotland) Robert Thornton (first round)
- (Scotland) William Borland (first round)
- (Northern Ireland) Brendan Dolan (first round)

European Qualifier
- (Poland) Krzysztof Ratajski (first round)
- (Netherlands) Jermaine Wattimena (third round)
- (Austria) Rowby-John Rodriguez (first round)
- (Latvia) Madars Razma (first round)
- (Netherlands) Danny Noppert (third round)
- (Netherlands) Ron Meulenkamp (third round)

West/South European Qualifier
- (Switzerland) Stefan Bellmont (first round)
- (Netherlands) Wessel Nijman (first round)

Host Nation Qualifier
- (Czech Republic) Jan Hlaváček (first round)
- (Czech Republic) Václav Schieferdecker (first round)
- (Czech Republic) Ondřej Plšek (first round)
- (Czech Republic) Karel Sedláček (second round)

Nordic & Baltic Qualifier
- (Sweden) Daniel Larsson (first round)

East European Qualifier
- (Poland) Sebastian Steyer (first round)

== Draw ==
First round (best of 11 legs); 28 June
(Czech Republic) Ondřej Plšek 77.84	0
(England) Keegan Brown 92.02	6
(Netherlands) Danny Noppert 99.53	6
(Switzerland) Stefan Bellmont 77.70	2
(Scotland) William Borland 84.77	3
(Scotland) John Henderson 97.83	6
(Poland) Krzysztof Ratajski 98.70	3
(England) Ted Evetts 97.10	6
(England) Stephen Bunting 95.75	6
(Scotland) Robert Thornton 85.89	3
(England) Chris Dobey 94.29	6
(Poland) Sebastian Steyer 89.76	2
(Czech Republic) Václav Schieferdecker 66.85	0
(Republic of Ireland) William O'Connor 86.71	6
(Netherlands) Jermaine Wattimena 98.02	6
(England) Kevin Garcia 77.90	0
(Czech Republic) Karel Sedláček 87.19	6
(Northern Ireland) Brendan Dolan 89.78	5
(England) Andrew Gilding 94.89	6
(Austria) Rowby-John Rodriguez 93.05	3
(England) Jamie Hughes 91.59	6
(South Africa) Devon Petersen 80.60	4
(Netherlands) Ron Meulenkamp 85.43	6
(Czech Republic) Jan Hlaváček 75.62	2
(England) Mervyn King 91.07	6
(England) Steve West 92.78	5
(Netherlands) Wessel Nijman 77.78	0
(Australia) Corey Cadby 92.97	6
(England) Glen Durrant 110.12	6
(Sweden) Daniel Larsson 91.72	1
(Latvia) Madars Razma 92.01	4
(England) Justin Pipe 95.23	6

Second round (best of 11 legs); 29 June
1	(Netherlands) Michael van Gerwen 95.09	5
(England) Keegan Brown 97.53	6
16	(England) Darren Webster 90.73	4
(Netherlands) Danny Noppert 92.30	6
8	(Austria) Mensur Suljović 92.02	6
(Scotland) John Henderson 77.94	0
9	(England) Ricky Evans 89.13	3
(England) Ted Evetts 96.22	6
5	(Scotland) Peter Wright 97.70	4
(England) Stephen Bunting 93.43	6
12	(England) Joe Cullen 91.10	3
(England) Chris Dobey 97.11	6
4	(Northern Ireland) Daryl Gurney 91.48	6
(Republic of Ireland) William O'Connor 86.96	4
13	(Wales) Jonny Clayton 88.93	2
(Netherlands) Jermaine Wattimena 91.81	6
2	(England) Ian White 99.72	6
(Czech Republic) Karel Sedláček 95.18	4
15	(England) Nathan Aspinall 87.53	4
(England) Andrew Gilding 92.11	6
7	(England) Adrian Lewis 77.93	0
(England) Jamie Hughes 96.97	6
10	(England) Steve Beaton 87.53	4
(Netherlands) Ron Meulenkamp 91.46	6
6	(England) James Wade 90.51	2
(England) Mervyn King 97.35	6
11	(England) Michael Smith 90.23	5
(Australia) Corey Cadby 98.10	6
3	(Wales) Gerwyn Price 100.70	6
(England) Glen Durrant 97.19	4
14	(Australia) Simon Whitlock 94.43	6
(England) Justin Pipe 97.81	5

Third round (best of 11 legs); 30 June
(England) Brown 95.20	6
(Netherlands) Noppert 94.83	4
8	(Austria) Suljović 97.20	6
(England) Evetts 95.61	3
(England) Bunting 87.62	6
(England) Dobey 90.32	5
4	(Northern Ireland) Gurney 96.59	6
(Netherlands) Wattimena 86.86	1
2	(England) White 87.20	6
(England) Gilding 72.52	1
(England) Hughes 102.72	6
(Netherlands) Meulenkamp 87.28	3
(England) King 88.51	6
(Australia) Cadby 81.68	4
3	(Wales) Price 93.10	3
14	(Australia) Whitlock 96.31	6

Quarter-finals (best of 11 legs); 30 June
(England) Brown 103.76	6
8	(Austria) Suljović 100.45	2
(England) Bunting 90.69	6
4	(Northern Ireland) Gurney 90.70	3
2	(England) White 98.77	5
(England) Hughes 99.84	6
(England) King 91.50	4
14	(Australia) Whitlock 88.66	6

Semi-finals (best of 13 legs); 30 June
(England) Brown 82.25	4
(England) Bunting 86.57	7
(England) Hughes 95.28	7
14	(Australia) Whitlock 87.63	3

Final (best of 15 legs); 30 June
(England) Bunting 81.52	3
(England) Hughes 96.63	8
