= Boris Krčmar =

Croatian darts player (born 1979)

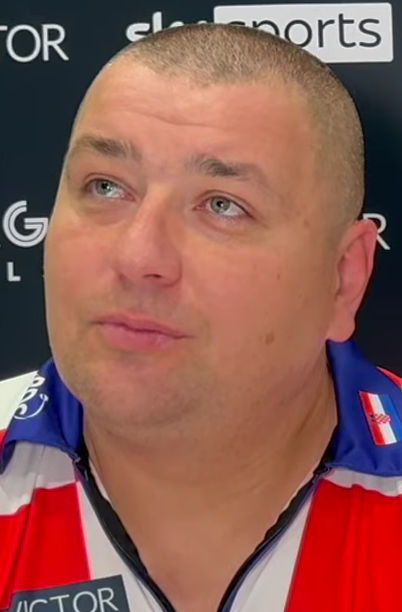
- Krčmar in 2024

Personal information
- Nicknames: "The Biggest" "Dum Dum"
- Born: 13 September 1979 (age 47) Zagreb, SR Croatia, Yugoslavia

Sport
- Sport: Darts
- Playing since: 1999
- Darts: 15.5g Cuesoul Signature
- Laterality: Right-handed
- Walk-on music: "Chelsea Dagger" by The Fratellis

Organisation (see split in darts)
- BDO: 2014-2019
- PDC: 2008– (Tour Card: 2020–2024)
- Current world ranking: (PDC) 142 (18 October 2026)

PDC premier events – best performances
- World Championship: Last 32: 2024
- UK Open: Last 16: 2022
- Grand Slam: Group Stage: 2021
- European Championship: Last 32: 2021
- PC Finals: Last 64: 2020, 2023
- World Series Finals: Last 16: 2024

Other tournament wins
- Years
Apatin Open	2014, 2015, 2019
Dartslive China	2014
Dartslive Las Vegas	2014
Dartslive World Championship	2016
FECS European Championship	2010
Medal record
Men's Darts
Representing Croatia
WDF World Cup
Bronze medal – third place	2025 Seoul	Men's team
IDF World Championship
Gold medal – first place	2009 Zagreb	Men's singles
Gold medal – first place	2011 Benidorm	Men's singles
Gold medal – first place	2013 Shanghai	Men's singles
Gold medal – first place	2015 Poreč	Men's singles
EDF European Championship
Gold medal – first place	2013 Podčetrtek	Men's cricket
Gold medal – first place	2013 Podčetrtek	Men's doubles
Gold medal – first place	2014 Podčetrtek	Men's singles
Gold medal – first place	2014 Podčetrtek	Men's cricket
Gold medal – first place	2015 Santa Susanna	Men's singles
Gold medal – first place	2018 Podčetrtek	Men's cricket
Gold medal – first place	2019 Podčetrtek	Men's singles
Gold medal – first place	2021 Podčetrtek	Men's singles
Gold medal – first place	2021 Podčetrtek	Men's cricket
Gold medal – first place	2022 Podčetrtek	Men's cricket
Gold medal – first place	2023 Podčetrtek	Men's singles
Gold medal – first place	2025 Podčetrtek	Men's singles
Gold medal – first place	2025 Podčetrtek	Men's cricket
Gold medal – first place	2025 Podčetrtek	Men's doubles
Silver medal – second place	2015 Santa Susanna	Mixed doubles
Silver medal – second place	2017 Podčetrtek	Men's singles
Silver medal – second place	2022 Podčetrtek	Men's singles
Silver medal – second place	2022 Podčetrtek	Men's doubles
Silver medal – second place	2024 Podčetrtek	Men's doubles
Silver medal – second place	2026 Podčetrtek	Men's doubles
Bronze medal – third place	2012 Podčetrtek	Men's singles
Bronze medal – third place	2012 Podčetrtek	Men's doubles
Bronze medal – third place	2021 Podčetrtek	Men's doubles
Bronze medal – third place	2021 Podčetrtek	Mixed doubles
Bronze medal – third place	2026 Podčetrtek	Men's cricket
EDU European Championship
Gold medal – first place	2009 Zadar	Men's singles
Gold medal – first place	2010 Leukerbad	Men's singles
Gold medal – first place	2012 Antalya	Men's singles
Gold medal – first place	2014 Poreč	Men's singles
Gold medal – first place	2014 Poreč	Men's cricket
Gold medal – first place	2015 Poreč	Men's cricket
Gold medal – first place	2016 Poreč	Men's cricket
Gold medal – first place	2018 Poreč	Men's cricket
Gold medal – first place	2024 Benidorm	Men's singles
Silver medal – second place	2008 Caorle	Men's cricket
Silver medal – second place	2016 Poreč	Men's singles
Silver medal – second place	2017 Caorle	Men's cricket
Bronze medal – third place	2010 Leukerbad	Men's cricket
Bronze medal – third place	2019 Caorle	Men's cricket

Boris Krčmar (born 13 September 1979) is a Croatian professional steel-tip and soft-tip darts player who competes in Professional Darts Corporation (PDC) events. He dominated soft-tip darts for over a decade. He is a four-time IDF World Champion, ten-time EDF European Champion, nine-time EDU European Champion and FECS European Champion. He was the first Croatian player to qualify for the PDC World Darts Championship. Krcmar is also a semi-finalist on the PDC Pro Tour and a quarter-finalist on the European Tour.

== Career ==
Krčmar won the IDF World Championship in 2009, 2011, 2013 and 2015. He started his career in 2005. From 2007 to present, he is the captain of the Croatian national team. Krčmar qualified for the 2011 PDC World Darts Championship by winning the Eastern European qualifier. In the preliminary round, he lost 4–2 to Denmark's Per Laursen.

He qualified for the 2012 PDC World Cup of Darts where he partnered Tonci Restovic in the Croatian team. After defeating Finland in the first round, they faced Wales in the second round. In his singles match, Krčmar forced Richie Burnett into a last leg decider before losing 4–3. In April, Krčmar earned a place in the Austrian Darts Open in Vienna by defeating Kurt van de Rijck and Antonio Alcinas in the European qualifier. He played Wes Newton in the first round and lost 6–4.

Krčmar had a very good year in soft tip events in 2014 by winning the Chinese and Las Vegas Dartslive events. He came very close to reaching his second World Championship when he lost in the final of the East European Qualifier for the 2015 edition 10–7 against Robert Marijanović.

On 19 January 2020, Krčmar won a two-year PDC Tour Card by finishing sixth on the European Q School Order of Merit, which granted him entry to tournaments on the PDC Pro Tour in 2020 and 2021. He withdrew from 2020 UK Open due to a prior commitment. The only major tournament he qualified was 2020 Players Championship Finals, where he lost in the first round against Michael Smith 5–6.

Krcmar entered the Eastern European Qualifier for 2021 PDC World Darts Championship and secured his return to the PDC World Championship for the first time since 2011. He lost in the first round to Ron Meulenkamp 3–1 in sets. He again withdrew from 2021 UK Open prior to the draw and was replaced. During 2021 Krcmar made his debut on European Tour, qualifying for the both events that took place and therefore also qualifying for 2021 European Championship, where he lost in the first round to Michael van Gerwen 6–2. Croatia were set to return to 2021 PDC World Cup of Darts, having not participated in the competition since 2013, but on 7 September, Croatia withdrew following an illness to Boris Krčmar. Later on in the year Krcmar won qualification for 2021 Grand Slam of Darts and was drawn to group C with James Wade, Rob Cross and Jim Williams. Unable to win any match in the group stage, he was eliminated after the round robin.

For the second time in a row Boris qualified for 2022 PDC World Darts Championship, this time via PDPA Qualifier. He lost in the first round of the main event to Adam Hunt 0–3 on sets but was able to hold his place in top 64 of the PDC Order of Merit and secured his Tour card for another year.

Krcmar made his debut on 2022 UK Open and received bye to the third round of the event. After wins over Zoran Lerchbacher 6–2, Luke Woodhouse 10-5 and Dave Chisnall 10–4, Boris advanced among last 16, where he lost 8–10 to James Wade. During 2022 Krcmar qualified for four European Tour events and achieved his best result so far on 2022 Dutch Darts Championship, where he played quarterfinals. Krcmar was unable to qualify for any other major event that year but secured his spot on 2023 PDC World Darts Championship via PDC Pro Tour, where he finished on 24th place.

Krcmar narrowly missed out on regaining his PDC Tour Card at Q School, losing to Dutch player Sietse Lap, in a deciding leg on the final day.

== World Championship results ==
=== IDF (soft-tip) ===
- 2009: Winner (beat Peter Martin)
- 2011: Winner (beat Krzysztof Kciuk)
- 2013: Winner (beat Paul Lim)
- 2015: Winner (beat Zdravko Antunović)

=== PDC ===
- 2011: Preliminary round (lost to Per Laursen 2–4) (legs)
- 2021: First round (lost to Ron Meulenkamp 1–3) (sets)
- 2022: First round (lost to Adam Hunt 0–3)
- 2023: Second round (lost to Nathan Aspinall 1–3)
- 2024: Third round (lost to Gary Anderson 1–4)
- 2026: First round (lost to Luke Woodhouse 1–3)

== Performance timeline ==
=== PDC ===
Tournament	2011	2012	2020	2021	2022	2023	2024	2025	2026
World Championship	Prel.	DNP		1R	1R	2R	3R	DNQ	1R
UK Open	DNP		WD		6R	3R	4R	DNP	
European Championship	DNP		DNQ	1R	Did not qualify				
Grand Slam	DNP		DNQ	RR	DNQ			DNP	
Players Championship Finals	DNP		1R	DNQ		1R	DNQ	DNP	
Non-ranked televised events
World Cup	NH	2R	DNP	WD	DNP	2R	QF	RR	RR
World Series Finals	NH		DNQ				2R	DNP	
Career statistics
Season-end ranking (PDC)	-	-	95	61	54	51	67	127	

==== European Tour ====
Tournament	2021	2022	2023	2025	2026
Hungarian Trophy	1R	3R	DNQ	WD	DNQ
Gibraltar Trophy	2R	DNQ	NH		
German Grand Prix	NH	2R	DNQ		
Dutch Championship	NH	QF	DNQ	2R	DNQ
Belgian Open	NH	2R	DNQ	3R	2R
German Championship	NH	DNQ	2R	DNQ	NH
European Trophy	NH			2R	DNQ
Poland Open	NH				3R

==== Players Championships ====
Season	1	2	3	4	5	6	7	8	9	10	11	12	13	14	15	16	17	18	19	20	21	22	23	24	25	26	27	28	29	30	31	32	33	34
2020	BAR; 1R	BAR; 1R	WIG; 2R	WIG; 1R	WIG; 2R	WIG; 2R	BAR; DNP	BAR; DNP	MIL; 1R	MIL; 2R	MIL; 1R	MIL; 1R	MIL; 2R	NIE; 4R	NIE; 4R	NIE; 3R	NIE; 2R	NIE; 2R	COV; 2R	COV; 2R	COV; 1R	COV; 1R	COV; 4R											
2021	BOL; 2R	BOL; 1R	BOL; 1R	BOL; 1R	MIL; 2R	MIL; 1R	MIL; 2R	MIL; 2R	NIE; 2R	NIE; 1R	NIE; 1R	NIE; 1R	MIL; 1R	MIL; 1R	MIL; QF	MIL; 1R	COV; 2R	COV; QF	COV; 1R	COV; 1R	BAR; 1R	BAR; 2R	BAR; 2R	BAR; 1R	BAR; 2R	BAR; 2R	BAR; 1R	BAR; 1R	BAR; 1R	BAR; 1R				
2022	BAR; 1R	BAR; SF	WIG; 3R	WIG; 2R	BAR; 2R	BAR; 1R	NIE; DNP	NIE; DNP	BAR; 1R	BAR; 3R	BAR; 1R	BAR; DNP	BAR; DNP	WIG; 1R	WIG; 1R	NIE; 1R	NIE; 1R	BAR; 1R	BAR; 3R	BAR; 1R	BAR; 1R	BAR; 1R	BAR; 3R	BAR; 2R	BAR; 1R	BAR; SF	BAR; 1R	BAR; 1R	BAR; 1R	BAR; 2R				
2023	BAR; 1R	BAR; 1R	BAR; 1R	BAR; 2R	BAR; 3R	BAR; 2R	HIL; 4R	HIL; 3R	WIG; 3R	WIG; 3R	LEI; 2R	LEI; QF	HIL; 1R	HIL; 1R	LEI; 2R	LEI; 2R	HIL; 1R	HIL; 1R	BAR; 1R	BAR; 1R	BAR; 2R	BAR; 2R	BAR; 1R	BAR; 3R	BAR; 1R	BAR; 1R	BAR; 2R	BAR; 1R	BAR; 2R	BAR; 3R				
2024	WIG; 1R	WIG; 1R	LEI; 2R	LEI; 1R	HIL; 2R	HIL; 1R	LEI; 1R	LEI; 1R	HIL; DNP	HIL; DNP	HIL; DNP	HIL; QF	MIL; 1R	MIL; 2R	MIL; 1R	MIL; 1R	MIL; 2R	MIL; 1R	MIL; 3R	WIG; 1R	WIG; 1R	LEI; 2R	LEI; 1R	WIG; 2R	WIG; 1R	WIG; 1R	WIG; 1R	WIG; 3R	LEI; 3R	LEI; 2R				
2025	Not a Tour Card holder																																	
2026	Not a Tour Card holder																																	

Performance Table Legend
W	Won the tournament	F	Finalist	SF	Semifinalist	QF	Quarterfinalist	#R; RR; Prel.	Lost in # round Round-robin; Preliminary round	DQ	Disqualified
DNQ	Did not qualify	DNP	Did not participate	WD	Withdrew	NH	Tournament not held	#R; RR; Prel.	Lost in # round Round-robin; Preliminary round	NYF	Not yet founded
