= Brett Claydon =

English darts player (born 1982)

Personal information
- Nickname: "The Shredder"
- Born: 11 October 1982 (age 44) Newmarket, Suffolk, England
- Home town: Soham, Cambridgeshire, England

Sport
- Sport: Darts
- Playing since: 2002
- Darts: 23g Mission Signature
- Laterality: Right-handed
- Walk-on music: "Can We Fix It?" by Bob the Builder

Organisation (see split in darts)
- PDC: 2011– (Tour Card: 2021–2022, 2024–2025)

PDC premier events – best performances
- UK Open: Last 64: 2024

Other tournament wins
- Years
PDC Challenge Tour	2014

Brett Claydon (born 11 October 1982) is an English professional darts player who competes in Professional Darts Corporation (PDC) events. He is a former PDC Tour Card holder, with his best major performance being reaching the last 64 at the 2024 UK Open. He won a title on the PDC's secondary tour, the Challenge Tour, in 2014.

== Career ==
Claydon won a PDC Challenge Tour event in 2014, defeating Aden Kirk 5–4 in the final.

He attended 2021 PDC Qualifying School (Q–School), finishing 11th on the UK Q-School Order of Merit, which earned him a PDC Tour Card for the 2021 and 2022 seasons.

Claydon won his Tour Card back at 2024 Q–School by finishing 8th on the UK Q-School Order of Merit.

He reached the last 64 at the 2024 UK Open, where he lost to Ryan Meikle.

== Performance timeline ==
Tournament	2015	2016	2017	2021	2022	2023	2024	2025
PDC Ranked televised events
World Masters	Did not qualify							Prel.
UK Open	1R	2R	1R	1R	2R	1R	4R	2R
Career statistics
Season-end ranking (PDC)	151	147	-	149	115	-	126	

=== PDC Players Championships ===
Season	1	2	3	4	5	6	7	8	9	10	11	12	13	14	15	16	17	18	19	20	21	22	23	24	25	26	27	28	29	30	31	32	33	34
2019	Did not participate																				HIL; 1R	HIL; 1R	Did not participate											
2021	BOL; 2R	BOL; 1R	BOL; 1R	BOL; 1R	MIL; 1R	MIL; 1R	MIL; 2R	MIL; 1R	NIE; Did not participate				MIL; 1R	MIL; 1R	MIL; 1R	MIL; 1R	COV; 1R	COV; 1R	COV; 1R	COV; 1R	BAR; DNP			BAR; 3R	BAR; 2R	BAR; 1R	BAR; 3R	BAR; 3R	BAR; 2R	BAR; 1R				
2022	BAR; 2R	BAR; 1R	WIG; 1R	WIG; 1R	BAR; 1R	BAR; 2R	NIE; 2R	NIE; 2R	BAR; 2R	BAR; 1R	BAR; 2R	BAR; 1R	BAR; 2R	WIG; 1R	WIG; 2R	NIE; 1R	NIE; 1R	BAR; 1R	BAR; 1R	BAR; 1R	BAR; 1R	BAR; 1R	BAR; 2R	BAR; 1R	BAR; 1R	BAR; 1R	BAR; 1R	BAR; 1R	BAR; 1R	BAR; 2R				
2024	WIG; 1R	WIG; 2R	LEI; 2R	LEI; 1R	HIL; 1R	HIL; 2R	LEI; 4R	LEI; 1R	HIL; 1R	HIL; 1R	HIL; 1R	HIL; 1R	MIL; 1R	MIL; 1R	MIL; DNP			MIL; 1R	MIL; 2R	WIG; 1R	WIG; 1R	LEI; 1R	LEI; 3R	WIG; 1R	WIG; 2R	WIG; 1R	WIG; 2R	WIG; 1R	LEI; 1R	LEI; 1R				
2025	WIG; 1R	WIG; 1R	ROS; 1R	ROS; 2R	LEI; 1R	LEI; 1R	HIL; 1R	HIL; 1R	LEI; 1R	LEI; 1R	LEI; 3R	LEI; 2R	ROS; DNP		HIL; 1R	HIL; 2R	LEI; 1R	LEI; 2R	LEI; 1R	LEI; 1R	LEI; 1R	HIL; 1R	HIL; 2R	MIL; 4R	MIL; 1R	HIL; 2R	HIL; 1R	LEI; 1R	LEI; 2R	LEI; 2R	WIG; 1R	WIG; 1R	WIG; 1R	WIG; 1R

Performance Table Legend
W	Won the tournament	F	Finalist	SF	Semifinalist	QF	Quarterfinalist	#R; RR; Prel.	Lost in # round Round-robin; Preliminary round	DQ	Disqualified
DNQ	Did not qualify	DNP	Did not participate	WD	Withdrew	NH	Tournament not held	#R; RR; Prel.	Lost in # round Round-robin; Preliminary round	NYF	Not yet founded
