= 2017 Austrian Darts Open =

Tournament on the PDC European Tour

Tournament information
- Dates: 23–25 June 2017
- Venue: Multiversum Schwechat
- Location: Vienna, Austria
- Organisation(s): Professional Darts Corporation (PDC)
- Format: Legs; First to 6 legs
- Prize fund: £135,000
- Winner's share: £25,000
- High checkout: 170 Michael Smith (final)

Champion(s)
- Michael van Gerwen (NED)

The 2017 Austrian Darts Open was the seventh of twelve PDC European Tour events on the 2017 PDC Pro Tour. The tournament took place at Multiversum Schwechat, Vienna, Austria from 23 to 25 June 2017. It featured a field of 48 players and £135,000 in prize money, with £25,000 going to the winner.

Phil Taylor defeated Michael Smith 6–4 in the final of the 2016 tournament, but he decided not to participate in the tournament in 2017.

Michael van Gerwen won the title, defeating Michael Smith 6–5 in the final.

== Prize money ==
This is how the prize money is divided:

Stage (num. of players)		Prize money
Winner	(1)	£25,000
Runner-up	(1)	£10,000
Semi-finalists	(2)	£6,000
Quarter-finalists	(4)	£4,000
Third round losers	(8)	£3,000
Second round losers	(16)	£2,000
First round losers	(16)	£1,000
Total	£135,000	

== Qualification and format ==
The top 16 players from the PDC ProTour Order of Merit on 11 May automatically qualified for the event and were seeded in the second round.

The remaining 32 places went to players from five qualifying events – 18 from the UK Qualifier (held in Milton Keynes on 19 May), eight from the West/South European Qualifier (held on 31 May), four from the Host Nation Qualifier (held on 22 June), one from the Nordic & Baltic Qualifier (held on 19 May) and one from the East European Qualifier (held on 22 June).

Adrian Lewis withdrew for health reasons the day before the event, meaning a fifth Host Nation Qualifier will take his place.

The following players took part in the tournament:

Top 16
1. (Netherlands) Michael van Gerwen (champion)
2. (Scotland) Peter Wright (second round)
3. (Austria) Mensur Suljović (third round)
4. (Australia) Simon Whitlock (third round)
5. (Netherlands) Benito van de Pas (third round)
6. (Netherlands) Jelle Klaasen (third round)
7. (Belgium) Kim Huybrechts (third round)
8. (England) Alan Norris (second round)
9. (England) Ian White (second round)
10. (England) Joe Cullen (semi-finals)
11. (England) Michael Smith (runner-up)
12. (Northern Ireland) Daryl Gurney (quarter-finals)
13. (Spain) Cristo Reyes (semi-finals)
14. (England) Mervyn King (quarter-finals)
15. (England) Stephen Bunting (second round)
16. (England) Steve West (second round)

UK Qualifier
- (England) ~~Adrian Lewis~~ (withdrew)
- (Wales) Jamie Lewis (second round)
- (England) Wayne Jones (first round)
- (England) David Pallett (first round)
- (England) James Wilson (first round)
- (England) Rob Cross (second round)
- (England) Chris Dobey (third round)
- (England) Lee Bryant (first round)
- (England) Andy Jenkins (first round)
- (England) Justin Pipe (first round)
- (England) Adrian Gray (first round)
- (Wales) Jonny Clayton (second round)
- (Scotland) John Henderson (second round)
- (England) Tony Newell (first round)
- (England) Chris Quantock (second round)
- (England) Paul Rowley (first round)
- (England) Ritchie Edhouse (first round)
- (Scotland) Jamie Bain (third round)

West/South European Qualifier
- (Netherlands) Vincent van der Voort (second round)
- (Netherlands) Christian Kist (first round)
- (Netherlands) Vincent van der Meer (third round)
- (Germany) Martin Schindler (quarter-finals)
- (Netherlands) Dirk van Duijvenbode (first round)
- (Belgium) Ronny Huybrechts (second round)
- (Germany) René Eidams (second round)
- (Belgium) Dimitri Van den Bergh (first round)

Host Nation Qualifier
- (Austria) Roxy-James Rodriguez (first round)
- (Austria) Rowby-John Rodriguez (first round)
- (Austria) Christian Kallinger (second round)
- (Austria) Zoran Lerchbacher (second round)
- (Austria) Rusty-Jake Rodriguez (second round)

Nordic & Baltic Qualifier
- (Finland) Kim Viljanen (quarter-finals)

East European Qualifier
- (Poland) Krzysztof Ratajski (first round)

== Draw ==
First round (best of 11 legs); 23 June
(England) Wayne Jones 79.80	3
(Austria) Christian Kallinger 83.21	6
(England) Adrian Gray 92.31	3
(Netherlands) Vincent van der Meer 86.69	6
(Netherlands) Christian Kist 92.06	1
(Scotland) Jamie Bain 99.91	6
(Austria) Rowby-John Rodriguez 82.53	4
(Germany) Martin Schindler 83.53	6
(Scotland) John Henderson 92.83	6
(Netherlands) Dirk van Duijvenbode 88.86	2
(Wales) Jonny Clayton 90.65	6
(Austria) Roxy-James Rodriguez 80.55	1
(Netherlands) Vincent van der Voort 101.86	6
(England) Tony Newell 91.56	3
(England) Justin Pipe 89.40	5
(Germany) René Eidams 83.03	6
(Finland) Kim Viljanen 96.04	6
(Poland) Krzysztof Ratajski 91.20	5
(England) Chris Dobey 87.36	6
(England) David Pallett 82.05	1
(England) Ritchie Edhouse 82.46	2
(Austria) Rusty-Jake Rodriguez 94.07	6
(Wales) Jamie Lewis 93.17	6
(Belgium) Dimitri Van den Bergh 94.64	5
(England) Rob Cross 89.69	6
(England) Andy Jenkins 85.58	4
(England) Chris Quantock 89.59	6
(England) Paul Rowley 86.15	4
(England) James Wilson 84.24	5
(Belgium) Ronny Huybrechts 88.23	6
(Austria) Zoran Lerchbacher 83.30	6
(England) Lee Bryant 77.10	4

Second round (best of 11 legs); 24 June
1	(Netherlands) Michael van Gerwen 94.96	6
(Austria) Christian Kallinger 77.89	1
16	(England) Steve West 85.78	4
(Netherlands) Vincent van der Meer 89.24	6
8	(England) Alan Norris 90.10	4
(Scotland) Jamie Bain 93.04	6
9	(England) Ian White 93.44	2
(Germany) Martin Schindler 98.92	6
5	(Netherlands) Benito van de Pas 88.67	6
(Scotland) John Henderson 93.72	3
12	(Northern Ireland) Daryl Gurney 92.61	6
(Wales) Jonny Clayton 87.98	2
4	(Australia) Simon Whitlock 87.97	6
(Netherlands) Vincent van der Voort 81.03	1
13	(Spain) Cristo Reyes 97.29	6
(Germany) René Eidams 91.94	5
2	(Scotland) Peter Wright 97.66	5
(Finland) Kim Viljanen 85.14	6
15	(England) Stephen Bunting 78.09	0
(England) Chris Dobey 88.41	6
7	(Belgium) Kim Huybrechts 90.88	6
(Austria) Rusty-Jake Rodriguez 85.95	3
10	(England) Joe Cullen 98.42	6
(Wales) Jamie Lewis 87.50	3
6	(Netherlands) Jelle Klaasen 94.93	6
(England) Rob Cross 83.26	0
11	(England) Michael Smith 94.95	6
(England) Chris Quantock 76.79	2
3	(Austria) Mensur Suljović 100.70	6
(Belgium) Ronny Huybrechts 82.03	1
14	(England) Mervyn King 99.54	6
(Austria) Zoran Lerchbacher 91.31	2

Third round (best of 11 legs); 25 June
1	(Netherlands) van Gerwen 96.31	6
(Netherlands) van der Meer 86.73	3
(Scotland) Bain 92.18	4
(Germany) Schindler 90.40	6
5	(Netherlands) van de Pas 90.64	3
12	(Northern Ireland) Gurney 98.51	6
4	(Australia) Whitlock 99.79	5
13	(Spain) Reyes 96.08	6
(Finland) Viljanen 91.99	6
(England) Dobey 92.18	2
7	(Belgium) K. Huybrechts 96.03	3
10	(England) Cullen 107.45	6
6	(Netherlands) Klaasen 88.59	4
11	(England) Smith 89.04	6
3	(Austria) Suljović 98.89	4
14	(England) King 93.48	6

Quarter-finals (best of 11 legs); 25 June
1	(Netherlands) van Gerwen 101.13	6
(Germany) Schindler 95.66	1
12	(Northern Ireland) Gurney 87.74	3
13	(Spain) Reyes 100.49	6
(Finland) Viljanen 97.90	4
10	(England) Cullen 99.94	6
11	(England) Smith 103.67	6
14	(England) King 89.76	3

Semi-finals (best of 11 legs); 25 June
1	(Netherlands) van Gerwen 115.57	6
13	(Spain) Reyes 95.93	1
10	(England) Cullen 79.67	4
11	(England) Smith 97.88	6

Final (best of 11 legs); 25 June
1	(Netherlands) van Gerwen 105.16	6
11	(England) Smith 101.01	5
