= Zdravko Antunović =

Croatian darts player

Personal information
- Born: 12 February 1974 (age 52) Bošnjaci, SFR Yugoslavia
- Home town: Bošnjaci, Croatia

Sport
- Sport: Darts
- Playing since: 2005
- Laterality: Right-handed

Organisation (see split in darts)
- BDO: 2012–2020
- PDC: 2010–2012
- WDF: 2012–

Other tournament wins
- Years
Apatin Open	2012
Hungarian Open	2013
Medal record
Men's Darts
Representing Croatia
IDF World Ch'ship
Silver medal – second place	2015 Poreč	Men's singles
EDF European Ch'ship
Gold medal – first place	2013 Podčetrtek	Men's singles
Bronze medal – third place	2014 Podčetrtek	Men's singles
EDU European Ch'ship
Silver medal – second place	2015 Poreč	Men's cricket

Zdravko Antunović (born 12 February 1974) is a Croatian professional darts player who played in Professional Darts Corporation (PDC) events.

Antunović qualified for the 2012 German Darts Championship in the newly formed PDC European Tour, but lost his first round match to Wayne Jones of England.

He won the Apatin Open in 2012 and the Hungarian Open in 2013.
