= Benjamin Pratnemer =

Slovenian darts player (born 1979)

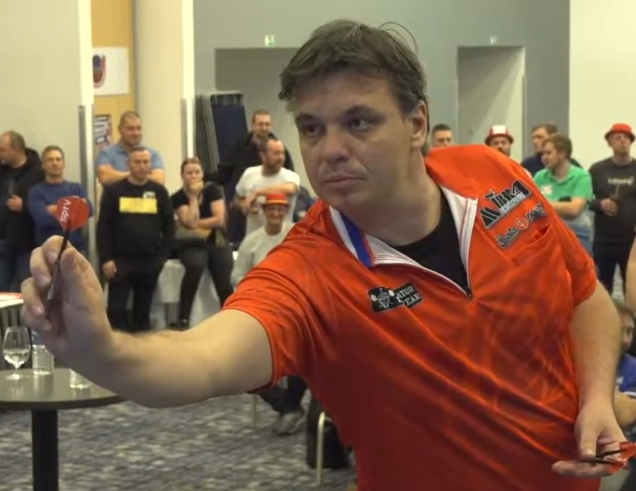
- Pratnemer in 2022

Personal information
- Nickname: "The Star"
- Born: 31 March 1979 (age 47) Maribor, SR Slovenia, Yugoslavia
- Home town: Maribor, Slovenia

Sport
- Sport: Darts
- Playing since: 2018
- Darts: 21g Bull's NL Signature
- Laterality: Right-handed
- Walk-on music: "It's a Long Way to the Top" by AC/DC

Organisation (see split in darts)
- BDO: 2017–2020
- PDC: 2019–present (Tour Card: 2026–present)
- WDF: 2021–2025
- Current world ranking: (PDC) 111 ▼1 (29 October 2026)

WDF major events – best performances
- World Championship: Last 16: 2025
- World Masters: Last 16: 2025

PDC premier events – best performances
- World Championship: Last 96: 2020
- UK Open: Last 64: 2026

Other tournament wins
- Years
| Hungarian Classic | 2018 |
| Hungarian Masters | 2018, 2024 |
| Slovenia Open | 2021 |
| Balaton Masters | 2022, 2024 |
| World Open | 2022 |
| Slovak Masters | 2023 |
| Slovenia Masters | 2021 |
| Hungarian Grand Prix | 2024 |
| Slovak Classic | 2024, 2025 |
| Budapest Masters | 2025 |
| Spring Special Darts Open | 2025 |
| Italian Grand Masters | 2025 |
| Austrian Laketown Open | 2025 |
| Winter Special Darts Open | 2025 |
Medal record
Men's Darts
Representing Slovenia
EDF European Ch'ship
| Silver medal – second place | 2018 Podčetrtek | Men's singles |
| Silver medal – second place | 2021 Podčetrtek | Men's singles |

Benjamin Pratnemer (born 31 March 1979) is a Slovenian professional darts player who competes in Professional Darts Corporation (PDC) events and previously competed in World Darts Federation (WDF) events. He is the first Slovenian player to earn a PDC Tour Card, and the first to win a match on the PDC European Tour.

== Career ==
Pratnemer won the PDC Eastern Europe World Championship qualifier in 2019, defeating János Végső of Hungary 6–1 in the final, which meant he qualified for the 2020 PDC World Darts Championship. He became the second Slovenian after Osmann Kijamet in 2010 to qualify for the event.

On 7 February 2020, he qualified for his first PDC European Tour event. He played in the 2020 Belgian Darts Championship, where he lost 5–6 in the first round against Wesley Plaisier. During his career in the World Darts Federation (WDF), Pratnemer won a total of 17 titles and qualified for three WDF World Darts Championships.

Pratnemer won a PDC Tour Card for the first time at 2026 Q-School, becoming the first Slovenian player to compete on the PDC Pro Tour full-time.

== World Championship results ==
=== PDC ===
- 2020: First round (lost to Justin Pipe 2–3)

=== WDF ===
- 2023: First round (lost to Davie Kirwan 0–2)
- 2024: Second round (lost to Carl Wilkinson 0–3)
- 2025: Third round (lost to Sybren Gijbels 1–3)

== Performance timeline ==
=== BDO ===
| Tournament | 2019 |
|---|---|
| World Masters | 4R |

=== WDF ===
| Tournament | 2022 | 2023 | 2024 | 2025 |
|---|---|---|---|---|
| World Championship | DNP | 1R | 2R | 3R |
| World Masters | RR | DNP | | 4R |

=== PDC ===
| Tournament | 2020 | 2026 |
|---|---|---|
| World Championship | 1R | DNQ |
| World Masters | DNP | Prel. |
| UK Open | DNP | 4R |
PDC Non-ranked televised events
| World Cup | DNQ | RR |

==== European Tour ====
| Tournament | 2024 | 2025 | 2026 |
|---|---|---|---|
| European Open | 1R | Did not qualify | |
| European Grand Prix | DNQ | 1R | DNQ |
| Czech Open | DNQ | 2R | DNQ |
| Slovak Open | NH | | 2R |

==== Players Championships ====
| Season | 1 | 2 | 3 | 4 | 5 | 6 | 7 | 8 | 9 | 10 | 11 | 12 | 13 | 14 | 15 | 16 | 17 | 18 | 19 | 20 | 21 | 22 | 23 | 24 | 25 | 26 | 27 | 28 | 29 | 30 | 31 | 32 | 33 | 34 |
|---|---|---|---|---|---|---|---|---|---|---|---|---|---|---|---|---|---|---|---|---|---|---|---|---|---|---|---|---|---|---|---|---|---|---|
| 2026 | HIL; 1R | HIL; 1R | WIG; 1R | WIG; 2R | LEI; 1R | LEI; 1R | LEI; 3R | LEI; 1R | WIG; 2R | WIG; 1R | MIL; 3R | MIL; 2R | HIL; 2R | HIL; 1R | LEI; 1R | LEI; 1R | LEI; 1R | LEI; 2R | MIL; 1R | MIL; 2R | WIG; 1R | WIG; 1R | LEI; 2R | LEI; 2R | HIL; 3R | HIL; 1R | LEI; 1R | LEI; 2R | ROS; 3R | ROS; 1R | ROS; 1R | ROS; 3R | LEI; 1R | LEI; 2R |

Performance Table Legend
| W | Won the tournament | F | Finalist | SF | Semifinalist | QF | Quarterfinalist | #R; RR; Prel. | Lost in # round Round-robin; Preliminary round | DQ | Disqualified |
| DNQ | Did not qualify | DNP | Did not participate | WD | Withdrew | NH | Tournament not held | #R; RR; Prel. | Lost in # round Round-robin; Preliminary round | NYF | Not yet founded |
