= EDF European Darts Championship =

European Darts Championship

Tournament information
- Venue: Terme Olimia
- Location: Podčetrtek
- Country: Slovenia
- Established: 2012
- Organisation(s): EDF
- Format: Legs

Current champion(s)
- Classic; Kim Huybrechts (men's); Lisa Ashton (women's) (Germany) Florian Preis (youth's U18) (Germany) Willi Keller (youth's U14); Cricket; Boris Krčmar (men's) (Slovenia) Nina Vavtar (women's)

The EDF European Darts Championship is an electronic soft-tip darts tournament held generally at Terme Olimia in Podčetrtek, Slovenia. Once time is held in Santa Susanna, Catalonia. First edition of this tournament took place in 2012. Championship tournaments are organized together with many other open-level tournaments in one week. Players with a PDC Tour Card can also take part in these tournaments.

The most successful player at this tournament is Boris Krčmar from Croatia.

== Classic tournaments ==
=== Men's singles ===
Year	Location	Medals			Details
Year	Location	Gold	Silver	Bronze	Details
2012	(Slovenia) Podčetrtek	Mensur Suljović	(Croatia) Kranjcina Kreso	Boris Krčmar	
2013	(Slovenia) Podčetrtek	(Croatia) Zdravko Antunović	(Serbia) Aleksandar Boric	(Serbia) Aco Babic	
2014	(Slovenia) Podčetrtek	Boris Krčmar	Max Hopp	(Croatia) Zdravko Antunović	
2015	(Catalonia) Santa Susanna	Boris Krčmar (2)	José de Sousa	Mensur Suljović	
2016	(Slovenia) Podčetrtek	Mensur Suljović (2)	(Austria) Christian Kallinger	Rusty-Jake Rodriguez	
2017	(Slovenia) Podčetrtek	Dimitri Van den Bergh	Boris Krčmar	(Serbia) Milan Zlatkovic	
2018	(Slovenia) Podčetrtek	Zoran Lerchbacher	Benjamin Pratnemer	Kim Huybrechts	
2019	(Slovenia) Podčetrtek	Boris Krčmar (3)	Zoran Lerchbacher	Kim Huybrechts	
2021	(Slovenia) Podčetrtek	Boris Krčmar (4)	Benjamin Pratnemer	Mike De Decker	
2022	(Slovenia) Podčetrtek	Kim Huybrechts	Boris Krčmar	Patrik Gosnak	

=== Women's singles ===
Year	Location	Medals			Details
Year	Location	Gold	Silver	Bronze	Details
2012	(Slovenia) Podčetrtek	(Slovenia) Mojca Muzic	Veronika Ihász	(Austria) Eva Klausner	
2013	(Slovenia) Podčetrtek	(Slovenia) Mojca Muzic (2)	Veronika Ihász	(Switzerland) Jeannette Stoop	
2014	(Slovenia) Podčetrtek	(Switzerland) Jeannette Stoop	(Slovenia) Mojca Muzic	(Germany) Christine Jahn	
2015	(Catalonia) Santa Susanna	(Austria) Eva-Maria Thaler	(Catalonia) Iolanda Riba	(Germany) Kathi Fuchs	
2016	(Slovenia) Podčetrtek	(Belgium) Dana Huybrechts	(Austria) Cvijeta Crnokrak	(Austria) Eva-Maria Thaler	
2017	(Slovenia) Podčetrtek	(Slovenia) Mojca Muzic (3)	(Belgium) Patricia De Peuter	(Poland) Renata Słowikowska	
2018	(Slovenia) Podčetrtek	(Slovenia) Mojca Muzic (4)	(Croatia) Marina Letica	(Austria) Marie-Therese Lechner	
2019	(Slovenia) Podčetrtek	(Belgium) Patricia De Peuter	(Austria) Christina Köstner	(Austria) Marina Theußl	
2021	(Slovenia) Podčetrtek	(Croatia) Marina Letica	(Italy) Barbara Osti	(Italy) Aurora Fochesato	
2022	(Slovenia) Podčetrtek	(United Kingdom) Lisa Ashton	(Croatia) Josipa Brzić	(Austria) Natascha Küpferling	

=== Youth's (U18) singles ===
Year	Location	Medals			Details
Year	Location	Gold	Silver	Bronze	Details
2014	(Slovenia) Podčetrtek	(Austria) Fredi Gsellmann	(Austria) Philip Koch	(Italy) Andrea Bacchiorri	
2015	(Catalonia) Santa Susanna	(Austria) Sebastian Krems	(Italy) Andrea Bacchiorri	(Austria) Sophie Fasching	
2016	(Slovenia) Podčetrtek	(Austria) Thomas Langer	(Austria) Nico Langer	(Austria) Mario Unterweger	
2017	(Slovenia) Podčetrtek	(Austria) Gregor Görg	(Austria) Thomas Langer	(Austria) Udo Lercher	
2018	(Slovenia) Podčetrtek	(Austria) Marco Jungwirth	(Austria) Lukas Doringer	(Austria) Andre Heinzle	
2019	(Slovenia) Podčetrtek	Sebastian Białecki	(Germany) Vincent Mook	(Austria) Kevin Köstner	
2021	(Slovenia) Podčetrtek	(Slovenia) Luka Marinic	(Germany) Simon Schönberger	(Germany) Kevin Reitmeier	
2022	(Slovenia) Podčetrtek	(Germany) Florian Preis	(Austria) Marcel Schöls	(Slovenia) Uroš Žalik	

== Cricket tournaments ==
=== Men's singles ===
Year	Location	Medals			Details
Year	Location	Gold	Silver	Bronze	Details
2012	(Slovenia) Podčetrtek	Mensur Suljović	(Austria) Erwin Freidl	(Bosnia and Herzegovina) Ali Hadzipasic	
2013	(Slovenia) Podčetrtek	Boris Krčmar	José de Sousa	(Austria) Christian Kallinger	
2014	(Slovenia) Podčetrtek	Boris Krčmar (2)	(Germany) Sven Seifert	Rowby-John Rodriguez	
2015	(Catalonia) Santa Susanna	Mensur Suljović (2)	Rowby-John Rodriguez	(Italy) Patrick Susanna	
2016	(Slovenia) Podčetrtek	Mensur Suljović (3)	(Austria) Hannes Schnier	(Austria) Christian Kallinger	
2017	(Slovenia) Podčetrtek	Krzysztof Ratajski	Dimitri Van den Bergh	Kim Huybrechts	
2018	(Slovenia) Podčetrtek	Boris Krčmar (3)	Krzysztof Ratajski	(Switzerland) Stefan Rückert	
2019	(Slovenia) Podčetrtek	Krzysztof Ratajski (2)	Zoran Lerchbacher	Tytus Kanik	
2021	(Slovenia) Podčetrtek	Boris Krčmar (4)	Michael Rasztovits	(Croatia) Ivica Cavric	
2022	(Slovenia) Podčetrtek	Boris Krčmar (5)	Ricardo Perez	José de Sousa	

=== Women's singles ===
Year	Location	Medals			Details
Year	Location	Gold	Silver	Bronze	Details
2012	(Slovenia) Podčetrtek	(Slovenia) Mojca Muzic	(Austria) Sonja Tschinkowitz	(Italy) Giada Marani	
2013	(Slovenia) Podčetrtek	Veronika Ihász	(Slovenia) Mojca Muzic	(Austria) Kerstin Rauscher	
2014	(Slovenia) Podčetrtek	(Slovenia) Mojca Muzic (2)	(Switzerland) Jeannette Stoop	(Austria) Kerstin Rauscher	
2015	(Catalonia) Santa Susanna	(Austria) Elisabeth Steinbach	(Catalonia) Nuria Plaza	(Italy) Talita Biagetti	
2016	(Slovenia) Podčetrtek	(Belgium) Dana Huybrechts	(Austria) Camelia Hejsek	(Austria) Elisabeth Steinbach	
2017	(Slovenia) Podčetrtek	(Belgium) Dana Verhaegen	(Italy) Giada Marani	(Slovenia) Mojca Muzic	
2018	(Slovenia) Podčetrtek	(Poland) Karolina Ratajska	(Austria) Elisabeth Steinbach	(Belgium) Dana Verhaegen	
2019	(Slovenia) Podčetrtek	(Poland) Karolina Ratajska (2)	(Poland) Katarzyna Bożek	(Austria) Christina Köstner	
2021	(Slovenia) Podčetrtek	(Croatia) Marina Letica	(Slovenia) Mojca Muzic	(Belgium) Dana Huybrechts	
2022	(Slovenia) Podčetrtek	(Slovenia) Nina Vavtar	(Belgium) Dana Huybrechts	(Hungary) Adrienne Végső	

== See also ==
- European Darts Championship
