= 2012 German Darts Championship =

Tournament information
- Dates: 22–24 June 2012
- Venue: Tempodrom
- Location: Berlin
- Country: Germany
- Organisation(s): PDC
- Format: Legs
- Prize fund: £82,100
- Winner's share: £15,000
- Nine-dart finish: (England) Colin Lloyd

Champion(s)
- (England) Phil Taylor

The 2012 German Darts Championship was the second of five PDC European Tour events on the 2012 PDC Pro Tour. The tournament took place at the Tempodrom in Berlin, Germany, from 22–24 June 2012. It featured a field of 64 players and £82,100 in prize money, with £15,000 for the winner.

Phil Taylor won the title, defeating Dave Chisnall 6–2 in the final. Colin Lloyd hit a nine-dart finish during his first round win over Alex Roy.

== Prize money ==
Stage (num. of players)		Prize money
Winner	(1)	£15,000
Runner-up	(1)	£7,500
Semi-finalists	(2)	£5,000
Quarter-finalists	(4)	£3,000
Third round losers	(8)	£1,500
Second round losers	(16)	£1,000
First round losers	(32)	£200
Final qualifying round losers	(32)	£100
Total	£82,100	

== Qualification ==
The top 32 players from the PDC Order of Merit automatically qualified for the event. The remaining 32 places went to players from three qualifying events - 20 from the UK Qualifier (held in Crawley on 25 May), eight from the European Qualifier (held in Cologne on 2 June), and four from the Host Nation Qualifier (held in Cologne on 1 June).

Gary Anderson and Keegan Brown withdrew from the event, with their opponents (Kevin Painter and Michael Barnard) receiving byes to the second round.

1–32

1. (England) Phil Taylor (winner)
2. (England) Adrian Lewis (first round)
3. (England) James Wade (first round)
4. ~~(Scotland) Gary Anderson (withdrew)~~
5. (England) Wes Newton (semi-finals)
6. (Australia) Simon Whitlock (semi-finals)
7. (England) Andy Hamilton (first round)
8. (Netherlands) Raymond van Barneveld (quarter-finals)
9. (Wales) Mark Webster (third round)
10. (England) Terry Jenkins (third round)
11. (England) Kevin Painter (third round)
12. (England) Mark Walsh (first round)
13. (England) Justin Pipe (quarter-finals)
14. (Netherlands) Vincent van der Voort (second round)
15. (England) Wayne Jones (second round)
16. (Australia) Paul Nicholson (second round)
17. (England) Colin Lloyd (third round)
18. (England) Mervyn King (quarter-finals)
19. (England) Ronnie Baxter (third round)
20. (England) Andy Smith (second round)
21. (England) Jamie Caven (first round)
22. (England) Denis Ovens (first round)
23. (Canada) John Part (second round)
24. (England) Colin Osborne (second round)
25. (England) Alan Tabern (second round)
26. (England) Dave Chisnall (runner-up)
27. (Northern Ireland) Brendan Dolan (second round)
28. (England) Steve Brown (second round)
29. (Netherlands) Co Stompé (third round)
30. (England) Steve Beaton (first round)
31. (Scotland) Peter Wright (second round)
32. (Wales) Richie Burnett (first round)

UK Qualifier

- (England) Reece Robinson (second round)
- (England) Alex Roy (first round)
- ~~(England) Keegan Brown (withdrew)~~
- (England) Mick Todd (first round)
- (England) Gaz Cousins (first round)
- (England) Darren Johnson (first round)
- (Northern Ireland) Mickey Mansell (third round)
- (England) Peter Hudson (first round)
- (England) Daniel Starkey (first round)
- (Republic of Ireland) William O'Connor (first round)
- (England) Dave Ladley (second round)
- (Scotland) Jim Walker (first round)
- (Wales) Steve Evans (first round)
- (England) Andy Jenkins (first round)
- (England) Darren Webster (first round)
- (England) Michael Barnard (second round)
- (India) Prakash Jiwa (first round)
- (England) Sam Hill (first round)
- (England) James Hubbard (third round)
- (England) Dean Winstanley (second round)

European Qualifier

- (Netherlands) Jerry Hendriks (first round)
- (Austria) Mensur Suljović (second round)
- (Belgium) Kim Huybrechts (quarter-finals)
- (Croatia) Zdravko Antunović (first round)
- (Sweden) Magnus Caris (first round)
- (Netherlands) Michael van Gerwen (first round)
- (Netherlands) Leon de Geus (first round)
- (Netherlands) Mareno Michels (first round)

Host Nation Qualifier

- (Germany) Andree Welge (first round)
- (Germany) Kevin Münch (first round)
- (Germany) Bernd Roith (first round)
- (Germany) Michael Rosenauer (second round)

== Draw ==
First round (best of 11 legs); 22 June
1	(England) Phil Taylor	6
(Netherlands) Jerry Hendriks	4
32	(Wales) Richie Burnett	2
(England) Reece Robinson	6
16	(Australia) Paul Nicholson	6
(Germany) Andree Welge	3
17	(England) Colin Lloyd	6
(England) Alex Roy	5
8	(Netherlands) Raymond van Barneveld	6
(Netherlands) Mareno Michels	1
25	(England) Alan Tabern	6
(Netherlands) Leon de Geus	5
9	(Wales) Mark Webster	6
(England) Darren Webster	4
24	(England) Colin Osborne	6
(England) Darren Johnson	2
5	(England) Wes Newton	6
(Republic of Ireland) William O'Connor	4
28	(England) Steve Brown	6
(Wales) Steve Evans	3
12	(England) Mark Walsh	5
(England) Dean Winstanley	6
21	(England) Jamie Caven	4
(Northern Ireland) Mickey Mansell	6
4	(Scotland) Gary Anderson	w/d
(England) Michael Barnard	w/o
29	(Netherlands) Co Stompé	6
(England) Sam Hill	2
13	(England) Justin Pipe	6
(Netherlands) Michael van Gerwen	4
20	(England) Andy Smith	6
(England) Mick Todd	5
2	(England) Adrian Lewis	4
(England) James Hubbard	6
31	(Scotland) Peter Wright	6
(India) Prakash Jiwa	5
15	(England) Wayne Jones	6
(Croatia) Zdravko Antunović	2
18	(England) Mervyn King	6
(England) Peter Hudson	3
7	(England) Andy Hamilton	4
(Germany) Michael Rosenauer	6
26	(England) Dave Chisnall	6
(England) Gaz Cousins	3
10	(England) Terry Jenkins	6
(Sweden) Magnus Caris	3
23	(Canada) John Part	6
(Germany) Bernd Roith	1
6	(Australia) Simon Whitlock	6
(England) Daniel Starkey	0
27	(Northern Ireland) Brendan Dolan	6
(Germany) Kevin Münch	4
11	(England) Kevin Painter	w/o
(England) Keegan Brown	w/d
22	(England) Denis Ovens	3
(England) Dave Ladley	6
3	(England) James Wade	5
(Austria) Mensur Suljović	6
30	(England) Steve Beaton	4
(Belgium) Kim Huybrechts	6
14	(Netherlands) Vincent van der Voort	6
(Scotland) Jim Walker	5
19	(England) Ronnie Baxter	6
(England) Andy Jenkins	5

Second round (best of 11 legs); 23 June
1	(England) Taylor 107.59	6
(England) Robinson 80.88	2
16	(Australia) Nicholson 94.74	2
17	(England) Lloyd 101.04	6
8	(Netherlands) van Barneveld 103.12	6
25	(England) Tabern 92.48	3
9	(Wales) M. Webster 93.73	6
24	(England) Osborne 86.83	4
5	(England) Newton 97.99	6
28	(England) S. Brown 90.82	2
(England) Winstanley 99.52	5
(Northern Ireland) Mansell 94.60	6
(England) Barnard 83.72	5
29	(Netherlands) Stompé 85.25	6
13	(England) Pipe 91.88	6
20	(England) A. Smith 89.74	4
(England) Hubbard 95.36	6
31	(Scotland) Wright 93.50	3
15	(England) Jones 98.17	3
18	(England) King 97.28	6
(Germany) Rosenauer 81.13	1
26	(England) Chisnall 108.35	6
10	(England) T. Jenkins 100.32	6
23	(Canada) Part 86.27	2
6	(Australia) Whitlock 98.01	6
27	(Northern Ireland) Dolan 99.68	5
11	(England) Painter 93.86	6
(England) Ladley 82.63	4
(Austria) Suljović 95.83	3
(Belgium) Huybrechts 96.64	6
14	(Netherlands) van der Voort 96.20	5
19	(England) Baxter 98.13	6

Third round (best of 11 legs); 24 June
1	(England) Taylor 107.24	6
17	(England) Lloyd 101.27	0
8	(Netherlands) van Barneveld 96.85	6
9	(Wales) M. Webster 90.52	3
5	(England) Newton 103.44	6
(Northern Ireland) Mansell 95.27	1
29	(Netherlands) Stompé 83.49	4
13	(England) Pipe 95.28	6
(England) Hubbard 85.57	4
18	(England) King 94.37	6
26	(England) Chisnall 102.52	6
10	(England) T. Jenkins 101.51	5
6	(Australia) Whitlock 106.83	6
11	(England) Painter 97.05	2
(Belgium) Huybrechts 92.97	6
19	(England) Baxter 94.40	4

Quarter-finals (best of 11 legs); 24 June
1	(England) Taylor 100.30	6
8	(Netherlands) van Barneveld 98.10	5
5	(England) Newton 98.90	6
13	(England) Pipe 100.30	3
18	(England) King 93.31	4
26	(England) Chisnall 99.25	6
6	(Australia) Whitlock 91.50	6
(Belgium) Huybrechts 91.13	4

Semi-finals (best of 11 legs); 24 June
1	(England) Taylor 99.12	6
5	(England) Newton 98.49	3
26	(England) Chisnall 94.26	6
6	(Australia) Whitlock 89.50	4

Final (best of 11 legs); 24 June
1	(England) Taylor 106.82	6
26	(England) Chisnall 100.60	2
