= 2024 European Darts Open =

2024 NEO.bet European Darts Open

Tournament information
- Dates: 21–23 June 2024
- Venue: Ostermann-Arena
- Location: Leverkusen, Germany
- Organisation(s): Professional Darts Corporation (PDC)
- Format: Legs
- Prize fund: £175,000
- Winner's share: £30,000
- High checkout: 170; Radek Szagański; Dirk van Duijvenbode; Chris Dobey

Champion(s)
- Dave Chisnall

The 2024 European Darts Open (known as the 2024 NEO.bet European Darts Open for sponshorship reasons) was the eighth of thirteen PDC European Tour events on the 2024 PDC Pro Tour. The tournament took place at the Ostermann-Arena, Leverkusen, Germany from 21 to 23 June 2024. It featured a field of 48 players and £175,000 in prize money, with £30,000 going to the winner.

Gerwyn Price was the defending champion after defeating Dirk van Duijvenbode 8–7 in the 2023 final. He lost 6–2 to Van Duijvenbode in the second round.

Dave Chisnall won the title, beating Ross Smith 8–6 in the final.

== Prize money ==
The prize fund remained at £175,000, with £30,000 to the winner:

Stage (num. of players)		Prize money
Winner	(1)	£30,000
Runner-up	(1)	£12,000
Semi-finalists	(2)	£8,500
Quarter-finalists	(4)	£6,000
Third round losers	(8)	£4,000
Second round losers	(16)	£2,500*
First round losers	(16)	£1,250*
Total	£175,000	

- Pre-qualified players from the Orders of Merit who lose in their first match of the event shall not be credited with prize money on any Order of Merit. A player who qualifies as a qualifier, but later becomes a seed due to the withdrawal of one or more other players shall be credited with their prize money on all Orders of Merit regardless of how far they progress in the event.

== Qualification and format ==
A massive overhaul in the qualification for the 2024 European Tour events was announced on 7 January.

For the first time, both the PDC Order of Merit and the PDC Pro Tour Order of Merit rankings were used to determine 32 of the 48 entrants for the event.

The top 16 on the PDC Order of Merit qualified, along with the highest 16 ranked players on the PDC ProTour Order of Merit (after the PDC Order of Merit players were removed). From those 32 players, the 16 highest ranked players on the PDC ProTour Order of Merit were seeded for the event.

The seedings were confirmed on 1 May.

The remaining 16 places went to players from four qualifying events – 10 from the Tour Card Holder Qualifier (held on 8 May), four from the Host Nation Qualifier (held on 19 May), one from the Nordic & Baltic Associate Nation Qualifier (held on 31 May) and one from the East European Associate Member Qualifier (held on the 7 April).

Gary Anderson, Luke Littler, Nathan Aspinall, Jonny Clayton and Ryan Joyce withdrew and were replaced by Ritchie Edhouse, Kevin Doets, Dylan Slevin, Jamie Hughes and Ryan Meikle. Gian van Veen moved up to become the 16th seed.

The following players took part in the tournament:

Seeded Players

1. Luke Humphries (second round)
2. Dave Chisnall (champion)
3. Damon Heta (semi-finals)
4. Rob Cross (second round)
5. Gerwyn Price (second round)
6. Danny Noppert (second round)
7. Michael van Gerwen (third round)
8. Josh Rock (third round)
9. Ross Smith (runner-up)
10. Ryan Searle (quarter-finals)
11. Stephen Bunting (quarter-finals)
12. Martin Schindler (quarter-finals)
13. Peter Wright (third round)
14. Chris Dobey (third round)
15. Ricardo Pietreczko (second round)
16. Gian van Veen (quarter-finals)

Order of Merit Qualifiers
- Michael Smith (semi-finals)
- Dimitri Van den Bergh (second round)
- Dirk van Duijvenbode (third round)
- Joe Cullen (first round)
- Daryl Gurney (second round)
- Raymond van Barneveld (third round)
- Krzysztof Ratajski (first round)
- Andrew Gilding (first round)
- James Wade (first round)
- Gabriel Clemens (first round)
- Luke Woodhouse (second round)

Tour Card Qualifier
- Nathan Rafferty (first round)
- Radek Szagański (first round)
- Mike De Decker (first round)
- Callan Rydz (second round)
- Dom Taylor (second round)
- Karel Sedláček (second round)
- Matthew Dennant (first round)
- Andy Baetens (second round)
- Owen Bates (third round)
- Jeffrey de Graaf (second round)
Host Nation Qualifier
- Nico Kurz (first round)
- Nico Blum (first round)
- Kevin Troppmann (second round)
- Jan Dueckers (first round)
Nordic & Baltic Qualifier
- Marko Kantele (first round)

East European Qualifier
- Benjamin Pratnemer (first round)

Reserve List
- Ritchie Edhouse (second round)
- Kevin Doets (third round)
- Dylan Slevin (second round)
- Jamie Hughes (first round)
- Ryan Meikle (first round)

== Draw ==
First round (best of 11 legs); 21 June
Raymond van Barneveld 96.60	6
Krzysztof Ratajski 96.92	5
Andy Baetens 88.06	6
Nathan Rafferty 87.49	5
Alt	Ryan Meikle 85.23	1
Dimitri Van den Bergh 109.45	6
Nico Kurz	w/d
Callan Rydz	w/o
Michael Smith 97.00	6
James Wade 98.83	5
Alt	Ritchie Edhouse 84.28	6
Jan Dueckers 76.54	0
Gabriel Clemens 96.27	3
Dirk van Duijvenbode 96.97	6
Karel Sedláček 96.44	6
Matthew Dennant 82.82	3
Mike De Decker 94.65	3
Luke Woodhouse 97.42	6
Nico Blum 78.02	3
Alt	Kevin Doets 84.18	6
Alt	Jamie Hughes 84.25	4
Alt	Dylan Slevin 84.66	6
Marko Kantele 80.88	0
Daryl Gurney 89.29	6
Radek Szagański 88.30	3
Dom Taylor 97.15	6
Jeffrey de Graaf 90.66	6
Andrew Gilding 89.63	4
Owen Bates 87.40	6
Joe Cullen 85.45	4
Benjamin Pratnemer 80.66	5
Kevin Troppmann 78.32	6

Second round (best of 11 legs); 22 June
1	Luke Humphries 96.48	4
Raymond van Barneveld 96.10	6
16	Gian van Veen 97.23	6
Andy Baetens 89.70	4
8	Josh Rock 100.02	6
Dimitri Van den Bergh 98.01	3
9	Ross Smith 90.16	6
Callan Rydz 83.95	2
4	Rob Cross 85.50	0
Michael Smith 89.29	6
13	Peter Wright 97.49	6
Alt	Ritchie Edhouse 95.03	3
5	Gerwyn Price 85.53	2
Dirk van Duijvenbode 102.58	6
12	Martin Schindler 102.93	6
Karel Sedláček 94.13	4
2	Dave Chisnall 101.03	6
Luke Woodhouse 100.06	5
15	Ricardo Pietreczko 95.05	4
Alt	Kevin Doets 92.16	6
7	Michael van Gerwen 92.77	6
Alt	Dylan Slevin 88.73	4
10	Ryan Searle 89.62	6
Daryl Gurney 93.12	4
3	Damon Heta 99.99	6
Dom Taylor 97.37	4
14	Chris Dobey 90.42	6
Jeffrey de Graaf 87.24	5
6	Danny Noppert 89.80	5
Owen Bates 85.75	6
11	Stephen Bunting 85.79	6
Kevin Troppmann 81.15	4

Third round (best of 11 legs); 23 June
van Barneveld 98.63	1
16	van Veen 103.22	6
8	Rock 101.40	5
9	R. Smith 106.39	6
M. Smith 94.07	6
13	Wright 94.90	4
van Duijvenbode 94.05	4
12	Schindler 99.36	6
2	Chisnall 96.45	6
Alt	Doets 91.40	4
7	van Gerwen 86.04	3
10	Searle 87.82	6
3	Heta 99.09	6
14	Dobey 101.03	5
Bates 88.42	0
11	Bunting 117.12	6

Quarter-finals (best of 11 legs); 23 June
16	van Veen 94.77	5
9	R. Smith 97.78	6
M. Smith 100.82	6
12	Schindler 95.14	5
2	Chisnall 92.22	6
10	Searle 92.54	5
3	Heta 100.62	6
11	Bunting 92.54	5

Semi-finals (best of 13 legs); 23 June
9	R. Smith 92.30	7
M. Smith 96.71	5
2	Chisnall 96.87	7
3	Heta 89.89	1

Final (best of 15 legs); 23 June
9	R. Smith 93.82	6
2	Chisnall 89.67	8
