= 2025 Czech Darts Open =

2025 Gambrinus Czech Darts Open

Tournament information
- Dates: 5–7 September 2025
- Venue: PVA Expo
- Location: Prague, Czech Republic
- Organisation(s): Professional Darts Corporation (PDC)
- Format: Legs
- Prize fund: £175,000
- Winner's share: £30,000
- High checkout: 170 Wessel Nijman

Champion(s)
- Luke Humphries (ENG)

The 2025 Czech Darts Open (known for sponsorship reasons as the 2025 Gambrinus Czech Darts Open) was a professional darts tournament that took place at the PVA Expo in Prague, Czech Republic, from 5 to 7 September 2025. It was the eleventh of fourteen PDC European Tour events on the 2025 PDC Pro Tour. It featured a field of 48 players and £175,000 in prize money, with £30,000 going to the winner.

Luke Humphries was the defending champion after defeating Kim Huybrechts 8–1 in the 2024 final. He retained the title, his eighth European Tour win, by beating Josh Rock 8–5 in the final.

== Prize money ==
The prize fund remained at £175,000, with £30,000 to the winner:

Stage (num. of players)		Prize money
Winner	(1)	£30,000
Runner-up	(1)	£12,000
Semi-finalists	(2)	£8,500
Quarter-finalists	(4)	£6,000
Third round losers	(8)	£4,000
Second round losers	(16)	£2,500*
First round losers	(16)	£1,250*
Total	£175,000	

- Pre-qualified players from the Orders of Merit who lose in their first match of the event shall not be credited with prize money on any Order of Merit. A player who qualifies as a qualifier, but later becomes a seed due to the withdrawal of one or more other players shall be credited with their prize money on all Orders of Merit regardless of how far they progress in the event.

== Qualification and format ==
In a change from the previous year, the top 16 on the two-year main PDC Order of Merit ranking were seeded and entered the tournament in the second round, while the 16 qualifiers from the one-year PDC Pro Tour Order of Merit ranking entered in the first round. In another change, the 16 Pro Tour Order of Merit qualifiers were drawn against one of the 16 other qualifiers in the first round.

The seedings were confirmed on 25 July. The remaining 16 places went to players from four qualifying events – 10 from the Tour Card Holder Qualifier (held on 31 July), four from the Host Nation Qualifier (held on 4 September), one from the Nordic & Baltic Associate Member Qualifier (held on 5 July), and one from the East European Associate Member Qualifier (held on 9 August).

Gary Anderson withdrew from the event. He was replaced by Madars Razma from the reserve list, while Martin Schindler moved up to become 16th seed.

The following players took part in the tournament:

Seeded Players

1. Luke Humphries (champion)
2. Luke Littler (third round)
3. Michael van Gerwen (third round)
4. Stephen Bunting (quarter-finals)
5. James Wade (semi-finals)
6. Chris Dobey (second round)
7. Gerwyn Price (quarter-finals)
8. Rob Cross (third round)
9. Damon Heta (second round)
10. Jonny Clayton (third round)
11. Dave Chisnall (second round)
12. Ross Smith (third round)
13. Peter Wright (third round)
14. Josh Rock (runner-up)
15. Danny Noppert (second round)
16. Martin Schindler (third round)

Pro Tour Order of Merit Qualifiers
- Cameron Menzies (second round)
- Gian van Veen (semi-finals)
- Wessel Nijman (quarter-finals)
- Ryan Searle (third round)
- Mike De Decker (second round)
- Nathan Aspinall (second round)
- Dirk van Duijvenbode (second round)
- Jermaine Wattimena (quarter-finals)
- Andrew Gilding (second round)
- Daryl Gurney (first round)
- Ricardo Pietreczko (first round)
- Luke Woodhouse (first round)
- Joe Cullen (first round)
- Raymond van Barneveld (first round)
- Ryan Joyce (second round)

Tour Card Qualifier
- Niko Springer (second round)
- Ritchie Edhouse (first round)
- Krzysztof Ratajski (second round)
- Brendan Dolan (first round)
- William O'Connor (second round)
- Richard Veenstra (first round)
- Ian White (first round)
- Kevin Doets (second round)
- Cor Dekker (first round)
- Maik Kuivenhoven (first round)

Host Nation Qualifier
- Filip Maňák (first round)
- Lukáš Unger (first round)
- Karel Sedláček (first round)
- Jiří Brejcha (first round)

Nordic & Baltic Qualifier
- Darius Labanauskas (first round)

East European Qualifier
- Benjamin Pratnemer (second round)

Reserve List
- Madars Razma (second round)

== Summary ==
=== First round ===
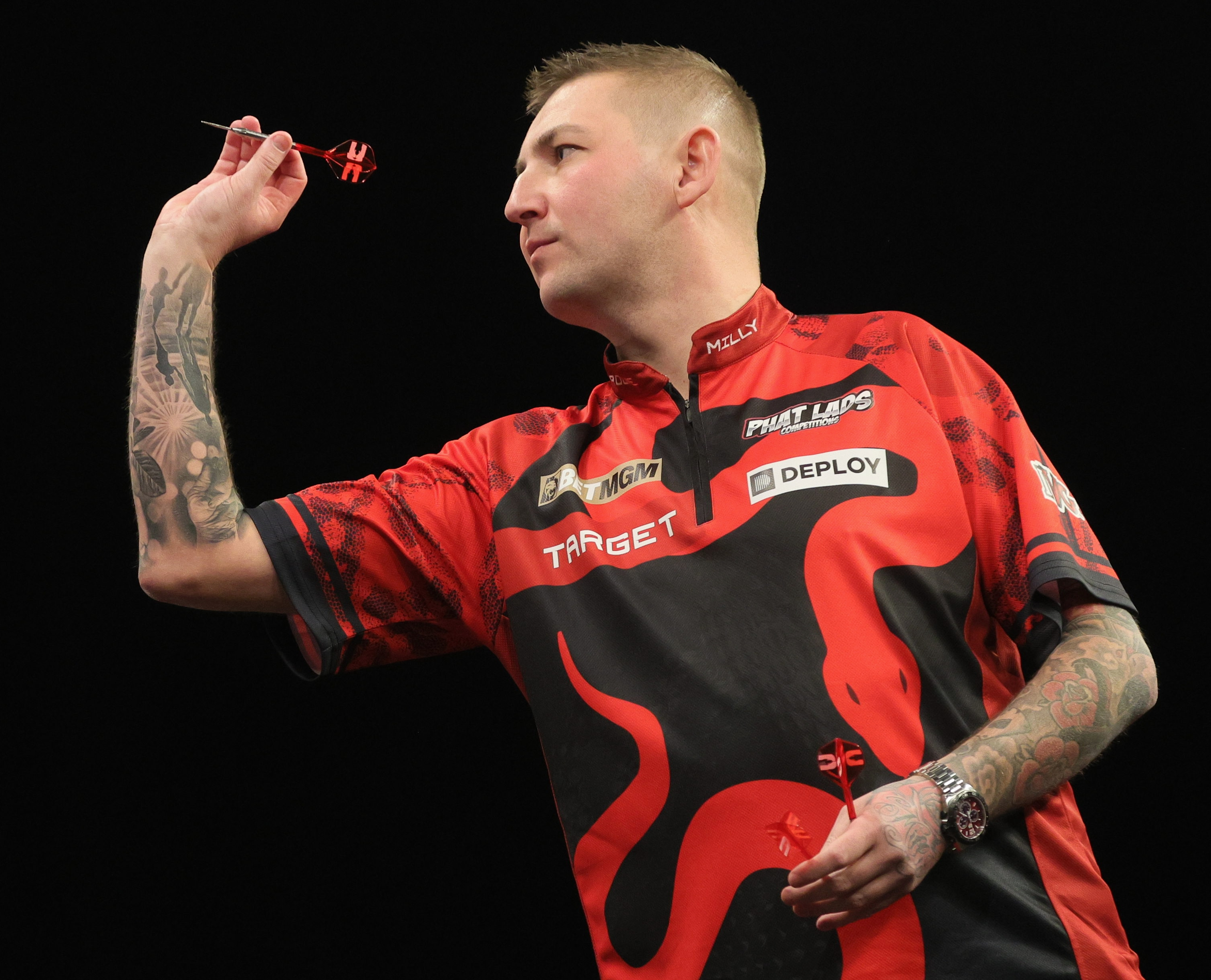
Nathan Aspinall (pictured) returned to competition for the first time since the World Matchplay.

The first round was played on 5 September. Nathan Aspinall, competing in his first tournament since the World Matchplay, advanced to the second round with a whitewash win over Czech qualifier Jiří Brejcha. "I could tell I hadn't played darts for seven weeks," remarked Aspinall, who believed his rhythm during the match was "awful". Dirk van Duijvenbode took a 4–0 lead against Cor Dekker before eventually winning 6–4, setting up a second-round tie against defending champion Luke Humphries. Slovenia's Benjamin Pratnemer claimed his first victory on the European Tour by defeating Ricardo Pietreczko 6–4. World Grand Prix winner Mike De Decker beat European Championship winner Ritchie Edhouse 6–3 to progress to a second-round match against world number three Michael van Gerwen; De Decker said that he would be "in for a tough task" if the best version of Van Gerwen showed up the following day. Cameron Menzies set up a tie against reigning world champion Luke Littler by defeating Ian White 6–3 and commented that he was "buzzing to play ... the best darts player in the world". Czech qualifier Lukáš Unger produced two ton-plus checkouts in his 6–3 loss to Madars Razma, while the other two Czech representatives, Karel Sedláček and Filip Maňák, lost to Ryan Joyce and Ryan Searle respectively. Krzysztof Ratajski and William O'Connor increased their chances of qualifying for the World Grand Prix in their wins over Raymond van Barneveld and Luke Woodhouse. Andrew Gilding came through a deciding leg against Darius Labanauskas to prevail 6–5, while Wessel Nijman defeated Dutch compatriot Richard Veenstra by the same scoreline. Niko Springer survived several match darts from Joe Cullen to win 6–5.

=== Second round ===
The second round was played on 6 September. Luke Littler started his campaign by defeating Cameron Menzies 6–2, while Luke Humphries began his title defence with a 6–4 win against Dirk van Duijvenbode. Michael van Gerwen recorded a three-dart average of 112.73 in his whitewash victory over Mike De Decker. "It's been hard for me the last year or so, my confidence level hasn't been great but if I keep working hard I can keep producing performances like this," said Van Gerwen following the win. James Wade averaged 107.71 on his way to beating Nathan Aspinall 6–3, 2023 champion Peter Wright defeated Benjamin Pratnemer 6–2 and Stephen Bunting progressed with a 6–4 win over Kevin Doets. Wessel Nijman led Damon Heta 4–1 but Heta managed to take the match to a deciding leg, hitting a 158 checkout in the process; Nijman won 6–5. Welsh World Cup teammates Gerwyn Price and Jonny Clayton set up a tie against each other in the third round by beating Niko Springer and Ryan Joyce respectively. In the last match of the round, Josh Rock defeated William O'Connor 6–2. First-round winners Andrew Gilding, Madars Razma and Krzysztof Ratajski were eliminated in the second round, while seeded players Chris Dobey, Danny Noppert and Dave Chisnall lost to Jermaine Wattimena, Gian van Veen and Ryan Searle respectively.

=== Final day ===
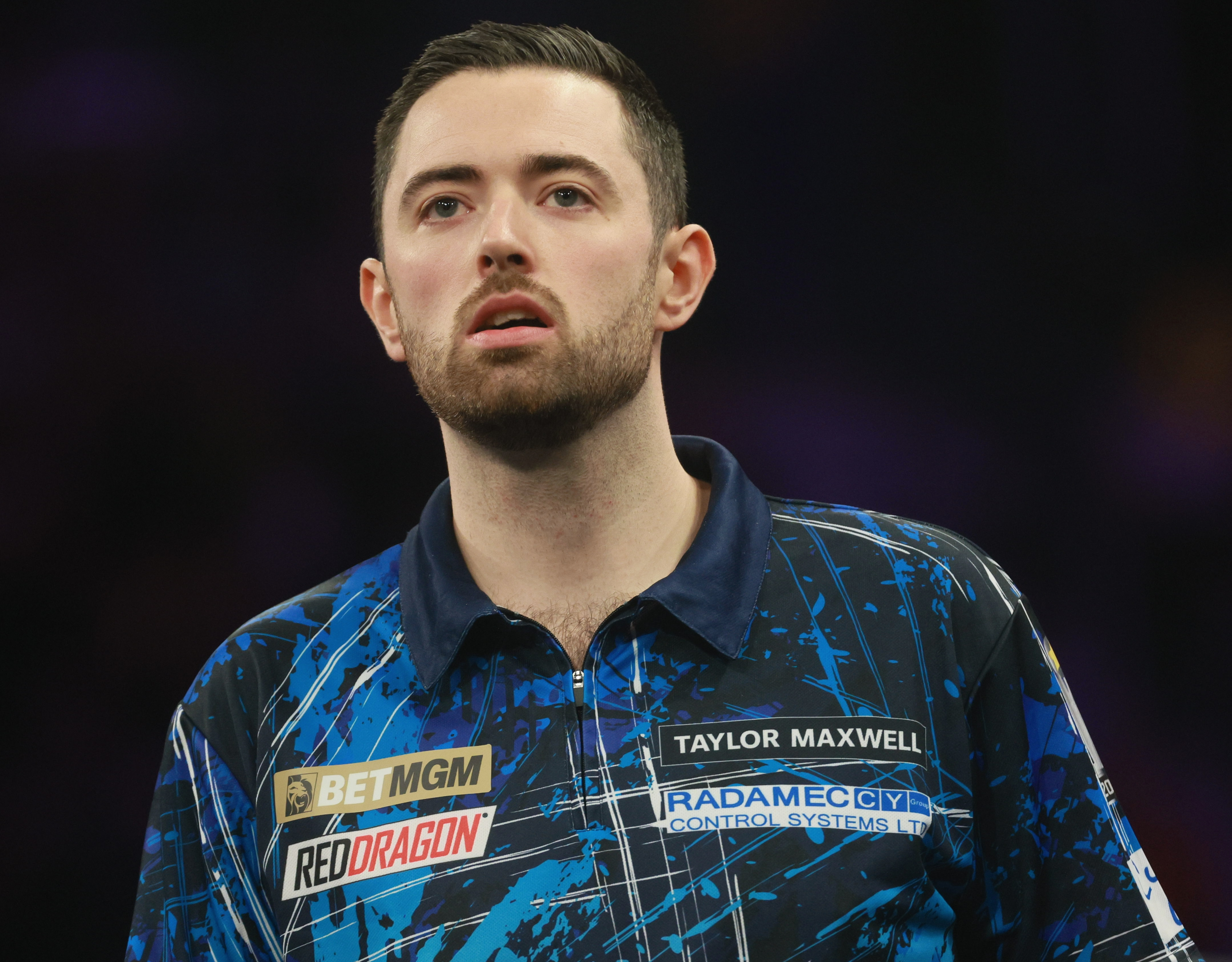
Luke Humphries (pictured) won his eighth European Tour title.

The third round, quarter-finals, semi-finals and final were played on Sunday 7 September. The final day saw Luke Humphries and Josh Rock reach the final. Humphries beat Martin Schindler 6–3 in the third round, survived a deciding leg against Wessel Nijman in the quarter-finals and defeated James Wade 7–1 to book his place in the final; Nijman landed a 170 checkout in defeat. Rock joined him after beating Michael van Gerwen 6–4, Jermaine Wattimena 6–1 and Gian van Veen 7–3. Van Veen had defeated world champions Luke Littler and Gerwyn Price to reach the semi-finals; he claimed his third consecutive win against Littler which ended Littler's 19-match winning streak on stage, before whitewashing Price 6–0. Rock was looking to win his first European Tour title of the year after finishing as runner-up at the Flanders Darts Trophy the previous week, while Humphries was looking to win the Czech Darts Open for the third time.

In the final, Rock established leads of 2–0 and 3–1 early on. Humphries recovered and went ahead but Rock hit a 153 checkout in the eighth leg to level the match at 4–4. Once at 5–5, Humphries took advantage of missed opportunities from Rock to take full control, following a 98 checkout by hitting double 10 to triumph 8–5. He finished with a three-dart average of 93.89, slightly lower than Rock's 94.10. Humphries retained the Czech Darts Open, marking his eighth European Tour title and his third Czech trophy after winning the tournament in 2022 and 2024. He stated that he felt "a bit emotional" following the match and praised the crowd in Prague by saying, "If it were up to me, I'd have all 14 European Tours held here." "We both didn't play to our full potential," claimed Rock about the pair's final performances. Despite the loss, he expressed satisfaction in his recent form: "I'm starting to be a proper darts player, getting further in tournaments, so I'm looking forward to the rest of the year."

== Draw ==
The draw was announced on 4 September. Numbers to the left of a player's name show the seedings for the top 16 in the tournament. The figures to the right of a player's name state their three-dart average in a match. Players in bold denote match winners.

**First round** (best of 11 legs); 5 September
**Dirk van Duijvenbode 101.43**	**6**
Cor Dekker 86.58	4
**Madars Razma 87.77**	**6**
Lukáš Unger 83.20	3
Raymond van Barneveld 87.95	1
**Krzysztof Ratajski 100.24**	**6**
**Wessel Nijman 92.46**	**6**
Richard Veenstra 87.94	5
Daryl Gurney 98.91	4
**Kevin Doets 100.16**	**6**
Ricardo Pietreczko 86.78	4
**Benjamin Pratnemer 85.72**	**6**
**Nathan Aspinall 85.89**	**6**
Jiří Brejcha 78.21	0
**Andrew Gilding 98.78**	**6**
Darius Labanauskas 90.84	5
**Cameron Menzies 100.91**	**6**
Ian White 87.19	3
**Gian van Veen 103.70**	**6**
Maik Kuivenhoven 99.65	3
Joe Cullen 88.69	5
**Niko Springer 90.65**	**6**
**Ryan Joyce 85.89**	**6**
Karel Sedláček 87.19	3
**Mike De Decker 100.90**	**6**
Ritchie Edhouse 89.10	3
Luke Woodhouse 92.80	5
**William O'Connor 93.61**	**6**
**Jermaine Wattimena 89.11**	**6**
Brendan Dolan 85.68	4
**Ryan Searle 85.61**	**6**
Filip Maňák 76.37	2

**Second round** (best of 11 legs); 6 September
**1**	**Luke Humphries 86.51**	**6**
Dirk van Duijvenbode 83.54	4
**16**	**Martin Schindler 93.60**	**6**
Madars Razma 93.33	3
**8**	**Rob Cross 97.81**	**6**
Krzysztof Ratajski 85.75	1
9	Damon Heta 97.71	5
**Wessel Nijman 99.81**	**6**
**4**	**Stephen Bunting 96.70**	**6**
Kevin Doets 88.44	4
**13**	**Peter Wright 83.24**	**6**
Benjamin Pratnemer 76.04	2
**5**	**James Wade 107.71**	**6**
Nathan Aspinall 98.22	3
**12**	**Ross Smith 90.54**	**6**
Andrew Gilding 87.43	4
**2**	**Luke Littler 98.92**	**6**
Cameron Menzies 90.36	2
15	Danny Noppert 98.28	2
**Gian van Veen 99.97**	**6**
**7**	**Gerwyn Price 100.78**	**6**
Niko Springer 95.23	2
**10**	**Jonny Clayton 97.31**	**6**
Ryan Joyce 89.15	2
**3**	**Michael van Gerwen 112.73**	**6**
Mike De Decker 96.46	0
**14**	**Josh Rock 97.42**	**6**
William O'Connor 87.69	2
6	Chris Dobey 92.97	2
**Jermaine Wattimena 95.06**	**6**
11	Dave Chisnall 93.50	4
**Ryan Searle 103.27**	**6**

**Third round** (best of 11 legs); 7 September
**1**	**Humphries 98.93**	**6**
16	Schindler 97.32	3
8	Cross 95.05	3
**Nijman 100.45**	**6**
**4**	**Bunting 95.10**	**6**
13	Wright 95.98	5
**5**	**Wade 97.12**	**6**
12	Smith 105.34	4
2	Littler 98.60	4
**van Veen 100.86**	**6**
**7**	**Price 98.98**	**6**
10	Clayton 92.44	4
3	van Gerwen 89.76	4
**14**	**Rock 103.18**	**6**
**Wattimena 99.23**	**6**
Searle 94.67	3

**Quarter-finals** (best of 11 legs); 7 September
**1**	**Humphries 103.53**	**6**
Nijman 101.82	5
4	Bunting 101.96	5
**5**	**Wade 95.37**	**6**
**van Veen 101.33**	**6**
7	Price 104.19	0
**14**	**Rock 110.65**	**6**
Wattimena 106.99	1

**Semi-finals** (best of 13 legs); 7 September
**1**	**Humphries 93.83**	**7**
5	Wade 85.40	1
van Veen 90.59	3
**14**	**Rock 98.00**	**7**

**Final** (best of 15 legs); 7 September
**1**	**Humphries 93.89**	**8**
14	Rock 94.12	5
