= Krzysztof Ratajski =

Polish darts player (born 1977)

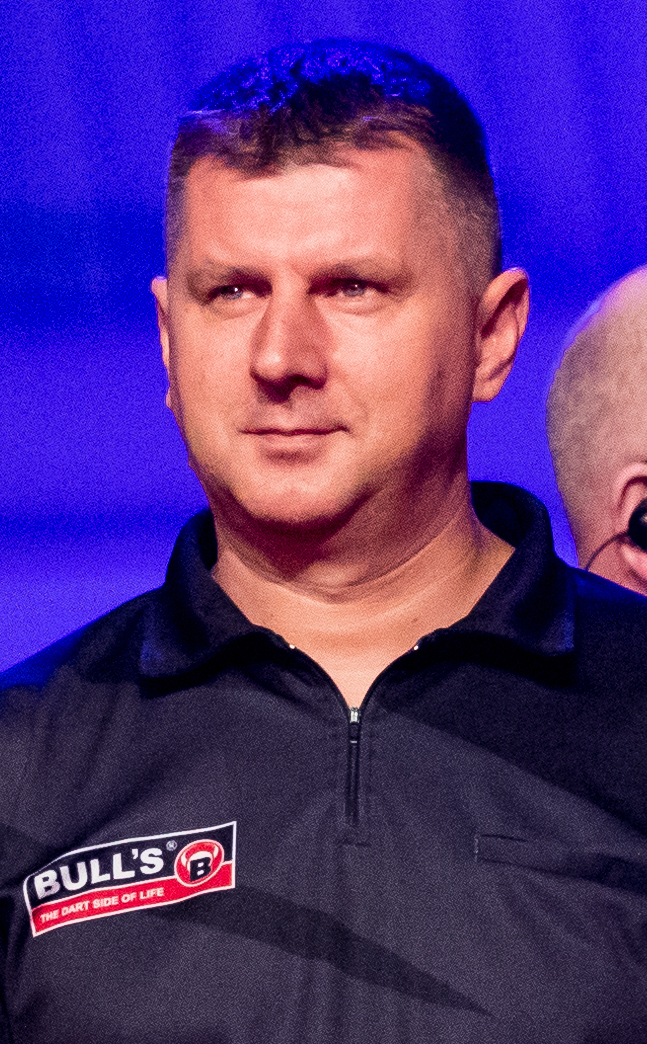
- Ratajski in 2019

Personal information
- Nickname: "The Polish Eagle"
- Born: 1 January 1977 (age 49) Skarżysko-Kamienna, Poland
- Home town: Warsaw, Poland

Sport
- Sport: Darts
- Playing since: 1997
- Darts: 24g BEAZD Signature
- Laterality: Right-handed
- Walk-on music: "Whatever You Want" by Status Quo

Organisation (see split in darts)
- BDO: 2007–2017
- PDC: 2018–present (Tour Card: 2019–present)
- WDF: 2007–2017
- Current world ranking: (PDC) 19 (5 November 2026)

WDF major events – best performances
- World Championship: Last 16: 2017
- World Masters: Winner (1): 2017
- World Trophy: Last 32: 2016

PDC premier events – best performances
- World Championship: Quarter-final: 2021, 2026
- World Matchplay: Semi-final: 2021
- World Grand Prix: Quarter-final: 2021
- UK Open: Quarter-final: 2021, 2026
- Grand Slam: Last 16: 2018, 2023
- European Championship: Semi-final: 2026
- PC Finals: Last 16: 2018, 2022, 2025
- Masters: Last 16: 2022, 2024
- World Series Finals: Semi-final: 2021

Other tournament wins
- Years
Czech Open	2009
Denmark Open	2008
Hungarian Classic	2016
Latvia Open	2010
Philippines Open	2019
Polish Open	2017
Polish Championship	2009, 2016, 2019, 2026
PDC Challenge Tour	2018
European Tour Events (x3)
European Darts Open	2026
German Darts Open	2023
Gibraltar Darts Trophy	2019
Players Championships (x8)
2018 (x2), 2019 (x2), 2020, 2021, 2023, 2025
UK Open Qualifiers
2018 UK Open Qualifier 6
Medal record
Men's Darts
Representing Poland
EDF European Championship
Gold medal – first place	2017 Podčetrtek	Men's cricket
Gold medal – first place	2019 Podčetrtek	Men's cricket
Silver medal – second place	2018 Podčetrtek	Men's cricket
Silver medal – second place	2018 Podčetrtek	Men's doubles
Silver medal – second place	2018 Podčetrtek	Mixed doubles
Bronze medal – third place	2019 Podčetrtek	Mixed doubles
EDU European Championship
Gold medal – first place	2003 Salou	Men's cricket
Gold medal – first place	2008 Caorle	Men's singles
Silver medal – second place	2002 St. Johann	Men's singles
Silver medal – second place	2002 St. Johann	Men's cricket
Silver medal – second place	2005 Sopron	Men's cricket
Silver medal – second place	2006 Umag	Men's singles
Bronze medal – third place	2004 Hamburg	Men's singles
SDWF European Ch'ship
Gold medal – first place	2005 Lloret de Mar	Men's singles

Krzysztof Ratajski (Polish pronunciation: [ˈkʂɨʂtɔf raˈtajski]; born 1 January 1977) is a Polish professional darts player who competes in Professional Darts Corporation (PDC) events. He has won 12 PDC ranking titles, including three on the European Tour. He also won the 2017 World Masters while competing in the British Darts Organisation (BDO). Nicknamed "the Polish Eagle", Ratajski is a four-time Polish national champion and is regarded as the best Polish player in the sport's history.

Despite not holding a PDC Tour Card, Ratajski won his first three PDC ranking titles during the 2018 PDC Pro Tour and automatically joined the tour the following year, winning his first European Tour title at the 2019 Gibraltar Darts Trophy. He reached his first PDC major semi-final at the 2021 World Matchplay. He is a two-time PDC World Championship quarter-finalist, reaching the last eight at the 2021 and 2026 editions.

Ratajski has represented Poland at the PDC World Cup of Darts 11 times: in 2010, 2013, and then every year from 2016 onwards. At the 2023 World Cup, Ratajski and his teammate Krzysztof Kciuk set the world record for highest pairs three-dart average, with a 118.10 average against Lithuania.

== Career ==
Ratajski's first major run came in the 2007 Czech Open where he reached the semi-finals. He gained notable wins over Joey ten Berge and local player Marek Polak, eventually losing to Patrick Loos who won the tournament. He then went on to win the 2008 Denmark Open, defeating Hungary's Nándor Bezzeg, Finland's Marko Kantele and Belgian Geert De Vos en route to the final where he beat Fabian Roosenbrand.

On 4 December 2008 Ratajski qualified for the 2009 BDO World Darts Championship, earning one of five spots available. He earned notable wins over former qualifier Ian Jones and Mike Veitch before beating Robbie Green to qualify, becoming the first Polish player to qualify for either world championship. The next day, Ratajski took part in the 2008 Winmau World Masters, but lost in the very first round to Denmark's Stig Jorgensen. Ratajski then lost in the first round of the 2009 World Championship to Edwin Max.

Ratajski represented Poland in the inaugural PDC World Cup of darts in partnership with Krzysztof Kciuk. They lost 2–6 in the first round to New Zealand, who were represented by Phillip Hazel and Warren Parry. He did not feature in the tournament again until 2013, once more with Kciuk, and they progressed to the last 16 by finishing second in Group E thanks to beating Gibraltar 5–2. They played the host nation Germany, who were represented by Jyhan Artut and Andree Welge, and were defeated 5–2.

He lost in the semi-finals of the 2015 Polish Open 5–2 to Scott Waites. Ratajski made his PDC European Tour debut at the 2015 European Darts Trophy and was edged out 6–5 by Adam Hunt in the first round. He was knocked out 3–2 by Martin Adams in the last 16 of the World Masters.

Ratajski played in the BDO World Trophy for the first time in 2016 and lost 6–4 to Scott Waites. He teamed up with Mariusz Paul at the 2016 PDC World Cup of Darts and they were defeated 5–1 by Belgium in the opening round. He qualified for the International Darts Open and was eliminated 6–1 by Chris Dobey in the first round.

Ratajski qualified for the 2017 BDO World Darts Championship. He earned his first two wins at the event, including a 3–0 victory over Wesley Harms, before narrowly losing to Darius Labanauskas in the last 16. At the 2017 World Cup, Ratajski and Tytus Kanik lost 5–3 in the first round to the Irish team of Mick McGowan and William O'Connor.

At the 2017 World Masters, Ratajski was unseeded and had to start from the first round. He defeated two-time reigning champion Glen Durrant in the quarter-finals, Scotland's Cameron Menzies in the semi-final, and world number one Mark McGeeney 6–1 in the final for his first televised major title. In doing so, Ratajski also guaranteed qualification for the 2018 BDO World Darts Championship, but declined his invitation in favour of an attempt to qualify for the rival 2018 PDC World Darts Championship. He qualified for the latter as the top ranked Eastern European on the PDC Pro Tour.

Ratajski competed in his first PDC premier event as a singles player at the 2017 European Championship. He lost 3–6 to Peter Wright in the first round. In the 2018 World Championship Ratajski lost 1–3 to James Wilson despite winning the first set.

=== 2018 ===
In January, Ratajski entered Q-School, but failed to gain a PDC Tour Card. Ratajski played on the 2018 Challenge Tour. Ratajski made the final at event 8 and won event 14. Due to these successes, he was able to play some Players Championship events towards the end of 2018.

In February Ratajski became the first Polish player to win a PDC event, defeating Daryl Gurney 6–4 in the final of the sixth UK Open qualifier.

Ratajski won a Players Championship event on 20 October 2018, defeating Chris Dobey 6–2 in the final of Players Championship 21, despite not having a tour card. Ratajski also won Players Championship 22 the following day, joining an elite club of only 8 PDC players to win two Players Championship titles in a single weekend by beating Adrian Lewis 6–4. His weekend “double header” win secured him a place at the 2019 PDC World Darts Championship. Ratajski also made the 2018 Players Championship Finals, where he beat Gerwyn Price and Adrian Lewis before losing to Danny Noppert, and the 2018 Grand Slam of Darts, where he was drawn in Group B. He defeated Raymond van Barneveld and Adam Smith-Neale and losing to Michael Smith, which meant that he went through to the last 16 stage where he lost to Jonny Clayton.

=== 2019 ===
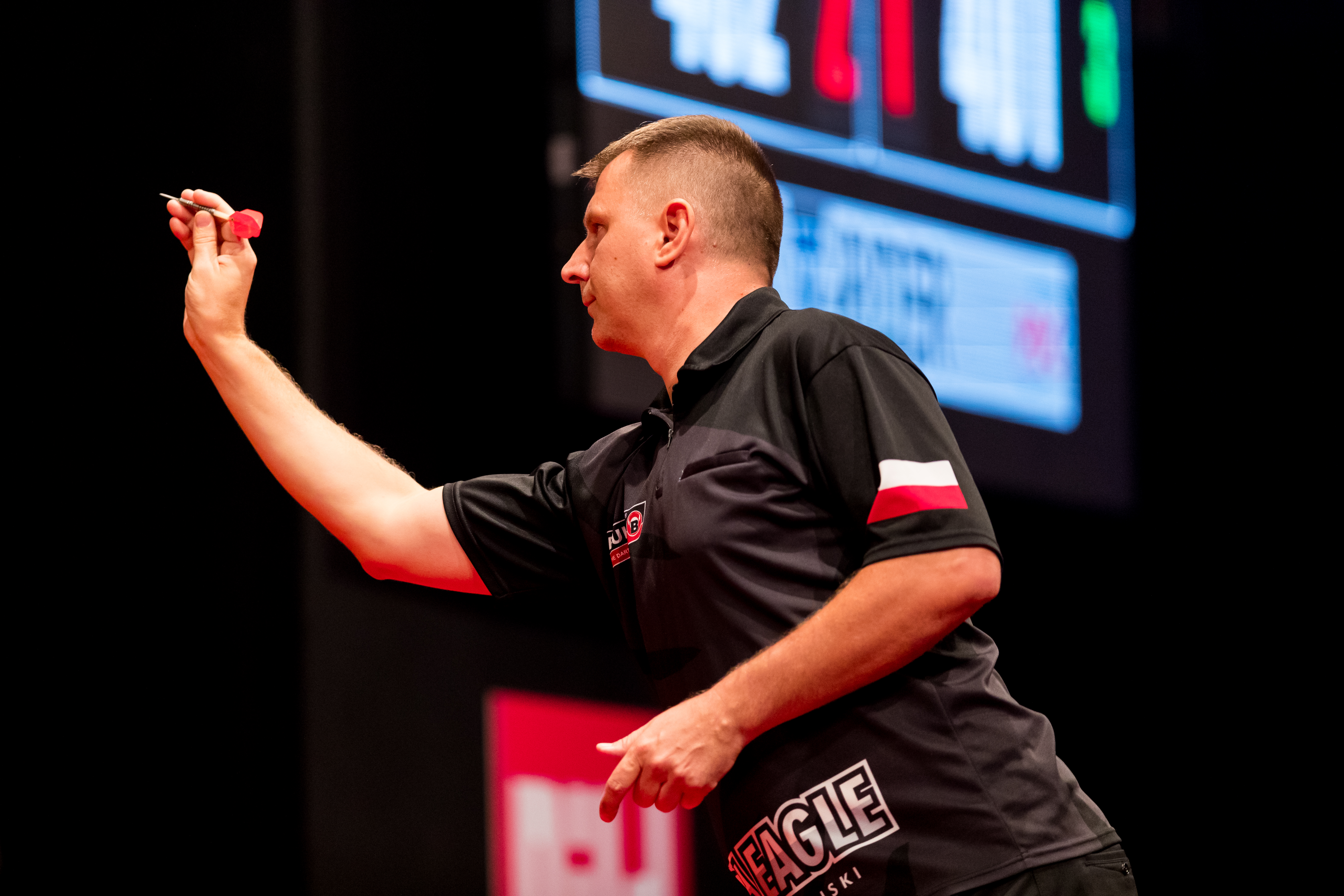
Ratajski at the 2019 European Darts Matchplay

Despite a 3–2 loss to Seigo Asada in the first round of the 2019 PDC World Championship, Ratajski was able to secure an automatic PDC Tour Card thanks to his placement in the top 64 of the PDC Order of Merit.

He made his debut in several major tournaments over the course of the year, qualifying for the World Matchplay, World Grand Prix, and World Series Finals. He reached the quarter-finals of the latter, bowing out in a deciding leg to Mensur Suljović.

He picked up two ranking titles in Players Championship events. He defeated reigning UK Open champion Nathan Aspinall 8–3 in the final of Players Championship 17 and followed that with another win at Players Championship 21, where he defeated Dimitri Van den Bergh 8–7 in the final. These wins saw him enter the world's top 32 for the first time. In September, he won his first European Tour title by beating Dave Chisnall 8–2 in the final of the Gibraltar Darts Trophy, securing his sixth PDC ranking title and the first European Tour victory for a Polish player.

=== 2020 ===
Ratajski was the 21st seed at the 2020 World Championship and started in the second round. In his third appearance at the competition, he achieved his first win by defeating Zoran Lerchbacher 3–1. In the third round, he was beaten 4–3 by Nathan Aspinall.

He won his sole title of the year at Players Championship 4 in February, narrowly beating Ian White 8–7 in the final. In his second appearance at the World Matchplay, he reached the quarter-finals. He defeated Jermaine Wattimena 10–4 in the first round with a three-dart average of 107.53. He progressed to the last eight with a 12–10 win over Gabriel Clemens, before being eliminated by Michael Smith who won 16–13. He reached a further two ranking finals during the year but failed to claim another title, finishing as runner-up at the 18th and 23rd Players Championship events.

=== 2021 ===
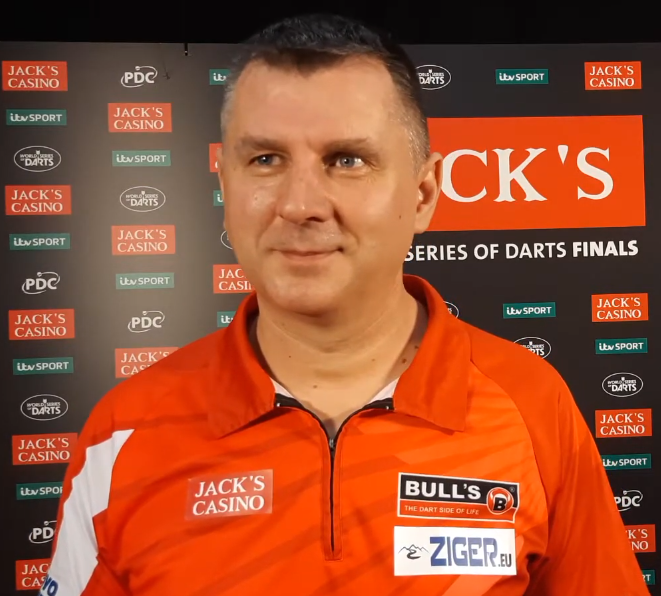
Ratajski at the 2021 World Series of Darts Finals

Ratajski achieved his first PDC World Championship quarter-final at the 2021 event. After a whitewash win over Ryan Joyce in his opening match, he then whitewashed Simon Whitlock in a 4–0 victory in the third round. A fourth-round win against Gabriel Clemens, a match where both players had darts to win the match, saw Ratajski become the first Polish player to reach the quarter-finals of the tournament. His run was ended by Stephen Bunting, to whom he lost 5–3.

Ratajski reached two televised semi-finals in 2021. He reached the last four of the World Matchplay for the first time after a 16–8 victory over Callan Rydz in the quarter-finals. He initially led his semi-final match against Dimitri Van den Bergh 6–2 but was eventually beaten 17–9. He reached the same stage at the World Series Finals, where he was defeated once again by Van den Bergh. Ratajski was successful in the final event of the 2021 Pro Tour, Players Championship 30, securing the title by defeating Joe Cullen 8–7 in the final.

=== 2022–2025 ===
Ratajski's best result during the 2022 PDC Pro Tour was a final at Players Championship 22, where he lost 8–3 to Nathan Aspinall. He won his first ranking title since November 2021 at 2023 Players Championship 9 with a resounding 8–1 victory over Chris Landman in the final. In Poland's second match of the 2023 PDC World Cup of Darts group stage, Ratajski and Krzysztof Kciuk defeated Lithuania 4–1 in legs, achieving the world record for highest pairs three-dart average with an average of 118.10. At the inaugural Poland Darts Masters, home favourite Ratajski won his opening-round match against Rob Cross 6–3 before exiting the tournament in the quarter-finals. He captured his second European Tour title and tenth PDC title overall by winning the 2023 German Darts Open, beating Stephen Bunting 8–3 in the final.

Ratajski did not win any titles during the 2024 season. Prior to the 2025 World Championship, he revealed that he had been struggling with aneurysms throughout the year. He stated that he underwent two surgeries, which successfully resolved the condition. At the World Championship, he was eliminated in the third round in a 4–3 loss to Kevin Doets despite having multiple match darts to win. In May 2025, Ratajski won Players Championship 15 by defeating Dave Chisnall 8–4 in the final. He reached the semi-finals of the German Darts Championship at the end of the year, losing 7–3 to the eventual champion Nathan Aspinall.

=== 2026 ===
At the 2026 World Championship, Ratajski reached his second World Championship quarter-final. In the third round, he recovered from 3–1 down to defeat Wesley Plaisier, who missed three match darts. He beat Luke Woodhouse 4–2 to progress to the last eight, where he lost 5–0 to Luke Littler. He was a quarter-finalist at the UK Open, and reached successive European Tour semi-finals at the German Darts Grand Prix and the European Darts Grand Prix. In July, Ratajski won his third European Tour title at the European Darts Open, defeating Jermaine Wattimena 8–6 in the final. On October 25th Ratajski beat Luke Littler in the Quarter Finals of the European Championships and lost 11-6 Martin Schindler in the Semi Finals.

== World Championship results ==
=== BDO World Championship ===
- 2009: First round (lost to Edwin Max 2–3)
- 2017: Second round (lost to Darius Labanauskas 3–4)

=== PDC World Championship ===
- 2018: First round (lost to James Wilson 1–3)
- 2019: First round (lost to Seigo Asada 2–3)
- 2020: Third round (lost to Nathan Aspinall 3–4)
- 2021: Quarter-finals (lost to Stephen Bunting 3–5)
- 2022: Second round (lost to Steve Lennon 1–3)
- 2023: Third round (lost to Dimitri Van den Bergh 1–4)
- 2024: Third round (lost to Jonny Clayton 2–4)
- 2025: Third round (lost to Kevin Doets 3–4)
- 2026: Quarter-finals (lost to Luke Littler 0–5)

== Career finals ==
=== BDO major finals: 1 (1 title) ===
Legend
World Masters (1–0)

Outcome	No.	Year	Championship	Opponent in the final	Score (Note: (l) = score in legs, (s) = score in sets.)
Winner	1.	2017	World Masters	(England) Mark McGeeney	6–1 (s)

== Performance timeline ==
=== PDC ===
Tournament	2010	2013	2016	2017	2018	2019	2020	2021	2022	2023	2024	2025	2026
PDC Ranked televised events
World Championship	BDO				1R	1R	3R	QF	2R	3R	3R	3R	QF
World Masters (Note: A non-ranked event until 2025)	Did not qualify							1R	2R	1R	2R	Prel.	Prel.
UK Open	Did not qualify				5R	6R	4R	QF	4R	4R	5R	6R	QF
World Matchplay	Did not qualify					2R	QF	SF	2R	1R	2R	DNQ	1R
World Grand Prix	Did not qualify					1R	1R	QF	2R	2R	DNQ	2R	1R
European Championship	Did not qualify			1R	DNQ	1R	1R	1R	1R	2R	DNQ	1R	SF
Grand Slam	Did not qualify				2R	DNQ	RR	RR	DNQ	2R	DNQ		RR
Players Championship Finals	Did not qualify				3R	2R	1R	2R	3R	1R	2R	3R	
PDC Non-ranked televised events
World Cup	1R	2R	1R	1R	1R	2R	2R	2R	2R	2R	2R	RR	2R
World Series Finals	Not held		Did not qualify			QF	2R	SF	DNQ	2R	DNQ	1R	DNQ
Career statistics
Year-end ranking	Not ranked			79	55	20	14	12	20	24	32	28	

==== European Tour ====
Season	1	2	3	4	5	6	7	8	9	10	11	12	13	14	15
2015	Did not participate						EDT; 1R	DNQ							
2016	Did not participate						IDO; 1R	DNQ							
2017	GDC; 2R	GDM; 1R	GDO; 2R	EDG; 2R	GDT; 2R	EDM; 1R	ADO; 1R	EDO; 2R	DDM; QF	GDG; 2R	IDO; DNQ	EDT; 2R			
2018	EDO; DNQ	GDG; 1R	DNQ		EDG; 1R	DDM; 3R	GDT; 1R	DDO; 1R	EDM; DNQ	GDC; 2R	DNQ		EDT; 2R		
2019	EDO; 3R	GDC; DNQ	GDG; 2R	DNQ		EDG; 2R	DDM; 2R	DDO; 2R	CDO; 1R	ADC; DNQ	EDM; QF	IDO; 2R	GDT; W		
2020	BDC; QF	GDC; QF	EDG; 2R	IDO; QF											
2021	HDT; 2R	GDT; QF													
2022	IDO; 2R	GDC; 3R	GDG; WD	ADO; 3R	EDO; 2R	CDO; 2R	EDG; 3R	DDC; 2R	EDM; 2R	HDT; 2R	GDO; QF	DNQ			
2023	BSD; DNQ	EDO; 2R	IDO; DNQ	GDG; DNP	ADO; 2R	DDC; 2R	BDO; 1R	CDO; DNQ	EDG; QF	EDM; DNQ	GDO; W	DNQ			
2024	BDO; 2R	GDG; 2R	IDO; 2R	EDG; 2R	ADO; 3R	BSD; 2R	DDC; DNQ	EDO; 1R	GDC; 3R	FDT; 1R	HDT; 1R	SDT; 1R	CDO; 2R		
2025	BDO; DNQ	EDT; DNQ	IDO; 1R	GDG; QF	ADO; 2R	EDG; 1R	DDC; DNQ	EDO; DNQ	BSD; 2R	FDT; 3R	CDO; 2R	HDT; DNQ	SDT; 3R	GDC; SF	
2026	PDO; 2R	EDT; 2R	BDO; 1R	GDG; SF	EDG; SF	ADO; 2R	IDO; 2R	BSD; 2R	SDO; 2R	EDO; W	HDT; 2R	CDO; 3R	FDT; 2R	SDT; 3R	DDC; 2R

==== Players Championships ====
Season	1	2	3	4	5	6	7	8	9	10	11	12	13	14	15	16	17	18	19	20	21	22	23	24	25	26	27	28	29	30	31	32	33	34
2018 (Note: Not a Tour card holder)	Did not participate																		DUB; 1R	DUB; 1R	BAR; W	BAR; W												
2019	WIG; 2R	WIG; 4R	WIG; 2R	WIG; 1R	BAR; 3R	BAR; 4R	WIG; 4R	WIG; 2R	BAR; 1R	BAR; 2R	BAR; 4R	BAR; 4R	BAR; 2R	BAR; QF	BAR; 4R	BAR; 4R	WIG; W	WIG; SF	BAR; 1R	BAR; 4R	HIL; W	HIL; QF	BAR; 3R	BAR; 3R	BAR; 2R	BAR; 2R	DUB; F	DUB; 2R	BAR; QF	BAR; F				
2020	BAR; 1R	BAR; 2R	WIG; 4R	WIG; W	WIG; 3R	WIG; SF	BAR; QF	BAR; DNP	MIL; SF	MIL; 3R	MIL; 2R	MIL; QF	MIL; 3R	NIE; QF	NIE; 1R	NIE; 1R	NIE; 4R	NIE; F	COV; 3R	COV; 1R	COV; 1R	COV; 2R	COV; F											
2021	BOL; 4R	BOL; 2R	BOL; QF	BOL; 2R	MIL; 3R	MIL; 1R	MIL; 1R	MIL; QF	NIE; 1R	NIE; 1R	NIE; 4R	NIE; 3R	MIL; 1R	MIL; 2R	MIL; 3R	MIL; 2R	COV; 1R	COV; 1R	COV; 3R	COV; 4R	BAR; 4R	BAR; 1R	BAR; 1R	BAR; QF	BAR; 3R	BAR; 3R	BAR; 1R	BAR; 4R	BAR; QF	BAR; W				
2022	BAR; QF	BAR; 2R	WIG; 1R	WIG; SF	BAR; 1R	BAR; 1R	NIE; 4R	NIE; 4R	BAR; 4R	BAR; 1R	BAR; 4R	BAR; 1R	BAR; 3R	WIG; QF	WIG; 1R	NIE; QF	NIE; 1R	BAR; 1R	BAR; 4R	BAR; 3R	BAR; 4R	BAR; F	BAR; 1R	BAR; 2R	BAR; 4R	BAR; 1R	BAR; 1R	BAR; 2R	BAR; 3R	BAR; 2R				
2023	BAR; 1R	BAR; 3R	BAR; 3R	BAR; 3R	BAR; 3R	BAR; 2R	HIL; SF	HIL; F	WIG; W	WIG; 2R	LEI; 2R	LEI; 1R	HIL; 2R	HIL; 2R	LEI; 1R	LEI; 1R	HIL; 3R	HIL; 1R	BAR; 1R	BAR; 2R	BAR; 2R	BAR; 3R	BAR; 4R	BAR; 1R	BAR; 1R	BAR; 2R	BAR; 1R	BAR; 2R	BAR; 2R	BAR; 3R				
2024	WIG; 2R	WIG; 2R	LEI; 1R	LEI; 3R	HIL; 3R	HIL; 2R	LEI; 2R	LEI; 1R	HIL; SF	HIL; SF	HIL; DNP	HIL; DNP	MIL; 4R	MIL; 1R	MIL; QF	MIL; 2R	MIL; 1R	MIL; 4R	MIL; 1R	WIG; 2R	WIG; 1R	MIL; 1R	MIL; 1R	WIG; QR	WIG; 2R	WIG; 1R	WIG; 1R	WIG; 4R	LEI; 4R	LEI; 1R				
2025	WIG; 2R	WIG; 4R	ROS; QF	ROS; 2R	LEI; 1R	LEI; 2R	HIL; QF	HIL; 1R	LEI; 1R	LEI; 1R	LEI; 1R	LEI; 1R	ROS; 1R	ROS; 1R	HIL; W	HIL; 2R	LEI; 1R	LEI; 3R	LEI; 1R	LEI; 1R	LEI; QF	HIL; 2R	HIL; 1R	MIL; 3R	MIL; 3R	HIL; 1R	HIL; 4R	LEI; 3R	LEI; 3R	LEI; 3R	WIG; 1R	WIG; 3R	WIG; 2R	WIG; 1R
2026	HIL; 1R	HIL; SF	WIG; 4R	WIG; 1R	LEI; 1R	LEI; 1R	LEI; 1R	LEI; 2R	WIG; 4R	WIG; 1R	MIL; 3R	MIL; 3R	HIL; 4R	HIL; QF	LEI; 1R	LEI; 4R	LEI; 2R	LEI; 1R	MIL; 3R	MIL; QF	WIG; 2R	WIG; 2R	LEI; 3R	LEI; 1R	HIL; 4R	HIL; 1R	LEI; 4R	LEI; QF	ROS; 1R	ROS; 1R	ROS; 2R	ROS; QF	LEI; 1R	LEI; 1R

Performance Table Legend
W	Won the tournament	F	Finalist	SF	Semifinalist	QF	Quarterfinalist	#R; RR; Prel.	Lost in # round Round-robin; Preliminary round	DQ	Disqualified
DNQ	Did not qualify	DNP	Did not participate	WD	Withdrew	NH	Tournament not held	#R; RR; Prel.	Lost in # round Round-robin; Preliminary round	NYF	Not yet founded
