= Christian Kallinger =

Austrian darts player (born 1982)

Personal information
- Nickname: "Gemini"
- Born: 13 June 1982 (age 44) Oberpullendorf, Austria
- Home town: Vienna, Austria

Sport
- Sport: Darts
- Playing since: 2000
- Laterality: Right-handed
- Walk-on music: "Fire of Night" by Caliban

Organisation (see split in darts)
- BDO: 2006–2009
- PDC: 2009–

WDF major events – best performances
- World Masters: Last 264: 2011
Medal record
Men's Darts
Representing Austria
EDF European Ch'ship
Silver medal – second place	2016 Podčetrtek	Men's singles
Bronze medal – third place	2013 Podčetrtek	Men's cricket
Bronze medal – third place	2016 Podčetrtek	Men's cricket

Christian Kallinger (born 13 June 1982) is an Austrian professional darts player who plays in Professional Darts Corporation (PDC) events.
