= Zoran Lerchbacher =

Austrian darts player

Personal information
- Nickname: "The Hypercane"
- Born: 30 May 1972 (age 54) Graz, Austria
- Home town: Knittelfeld, Austria

Sport
- Sport: Darts
- Playing since: 1994
- Darts: 21g Target
- Laterality: Right-handed
- Walk-on music: "Wake Me Up" by Avicii

Organisation (see split in darts)
- BDO: 2008–2011
- PDC: 2011–2022
- Current world ranking: (PDC) 172 ▼2 (18 October 2026)

WDF major events – best performances
- World Masters: Last 128: 2009

PDC premier events – best performances
- World Championship: Last 32: 2018
- UK Open: Last 64: 2017, 2018
- PC Finals: Last 64: 2017

Other tournament wins
- Years
PDC World Qualifying	2016
Medal record
Men's Darts
Representing Austria
EDF European Ch'ship
Gold medal – first place	2018 Podčetrtek	Men's singles
Silver medal – second place	2019 Podčetrtek	Men's singles
Silver medal – second place	2019 Podčetrtek	Men's cricket

Zoran Lerchbacher (born 30 May 1972) is an Austrian professional darts player from Graz, who competes in Professional Darts Corporation (PDC) events.

== Career ==
Lerchbacher qualified for the 2014 PDC World Darts Championship and won 4–1 in the preliminary round against Ben Ward. He then went out in a 3–0 loss to Michael van Gerwen. Lerchbacher was able to score a slightly higher average than Van Gerwen, but was only able to win one leg in the match. He entered Q School to try and win a tour card to compete on the PDC tour and lost in the final round of the fourth day 5–1 to Joe Murnan. Nevertheless, Lerchbacher had done enough to finish tied second on the Q School Order of Merit to seal his place on the PDC for 2014 and 2015. He had a disappointing first year on tour as his deepest runs were three last 64 defeats.

In 2015 Lerchbacher, attempted to qualify for six European Tour events and was successful at the final attempt in the European Darts Matchplay, but lost 6–1 to Darren Johnson. After his tour card expired Lerchbacher again entered Q School, but one last 32 exit over the four days was not enough to stay on tour.

Lerchbacher qualified for three European Tour events in 2016, losing 6–5 from 3–0 up in the first round of the Dutch Darts Masters to James Richardson. At the Austrian Darts Open he beat Jeffrey de Zwaan 6–4, before being whitewashed 6–0 in the second round by Jelle Klaasen. Lerchbacher advanced to the same stage of the European Darts Trophy by seeing off Joe Murnan 6–2 and lost 6–5 to Terry Jenkins.

A 10–1 thrashing of Dietmar Burger in the final of the East European Qualifier saw Lerchbacher play in the 2017 World Championship. He saw off Simon Stevenson 2–1 in the preliminary round and then lost 3–0 to Robert Thornton in the first round.

His best professional run came at the 16th Players Championship on the 2017 PDC Pro Tour: Six (four of them 6–5) wins en route saw him reaching his first PDC final. Players Lerchbacher beat included Mark Webster, Robert Thornton and Steve Beaton, before he fell to Joe Cullen 6–4 in the final.

At the 2018 World Championship he reached the second round after beating Mervyn King 3–2 in sets.

Lerchbacher fell off the Pro Tour at the end of 2019, and after a year without a Tour Card in 2020, he was successful at European Q School in February 2021 to turn professional again.

== World Championship results ==
=== PDC ===
- 2014: First round (lost to Michael van Gerwen 0–3)
- 2017: First round (lost to Robert Thornton 0–3)
- 2018: Second round (lost to Keegan Brown 2–4)
- 2020: Second round (lost to Krzysztof Ratajski 1–3)

== Performance timeline ==
=== BDO ===
Tournament	2009
World Masters	2R

=== PDC ===
Tournament	2014	2017	2018	2019	2020	2021	2022
PDC Ranked televised events
World Championship	1R	1R	2R	DNQ	2R	DNQ	
UK Open	DNP	2R	WD	3R	DNP	1R	3R
Players Championship Finals	DNQ	1R	DNQ		DNP	DNQ	
PDC Non-ranked televised events
World Cup	DNP		1R	QF	DNP		
Career statistics
Year-end ranking	126	61	61	76	-	89	133

==== Players Championships ====
Season	1	2	3	4	5	6	7	8	9	10	11	12	13	14	15	16	17	18	19	20	21	22	23	24	25	26	27	28	29	30
2017	BAR; 3R	BAR; 4R	BAR; 1R	BAR; 2R	MIL; 1R	MIL; 2R	BAR; 3R	BAR; 1R	WIG; 1R	WIG; 1R	MIL; 3R	MIL; 3R	WIG; 1R	WIG; 1R	BAR; 2R	BAR; F	BAR; 2R	BAR; 2R	DUB; 1R	DUB; 1R	BAR; 3R	BAR; 1R								
2018	BAR; 1R	BAR; 1R	BAR; 2R	BAR; 2R	MIL; 1R	MIL; 1R	BAR; 2R	BAR; 3R	WIG; 2R	WIG; 1R	MIL; 2R	MIL; 2R	WIG; 1R	WIG; 3R	BAR; 1R	BAR; 3R	BAR; DNP	BAR; 1R	DUB; 1R	DUB; 2R	BAR; 2R	BAR; 2R								
2019	WIG; 1R	WIG; 3R	WIG; 4R	WIG; 1R	BAR; 1R	BAR; 2R	WIG; 1R	WIG; 2R	BAR; 1R	BAR; 2R	BAR; 2R	BAR; 2R	BAR; 1R	BAR; 1R	BAR; 1R	BAR; 3R	WIG; 1R	WIG; 1R	BAR; 1R	BAR; 1R	HIL; 1R	HIL; 1R	BAR; 1R	BAR; 2R	BAR; 1R	BAR; 1R	DUB; 1R	DUB; 2R	BAR; 1R	BAR; 3R
2021	BOL; 1R	BOL; 2R	BOL; 1R	BOL; 1R	MIL; 2R	MIL; 1R	MIL; 2R	MIL; 2R	NIE; 1R	NIE; 3R	NIE; 1R	NIE; 2R	MIL; DNP				COV; 1R	COV; 3R	COV; 3R	COV; 1R	BAR; 1R	BAR; 1R	BAR; 2R	BAR; DNP						
2022	Did not participate						NIE; 1R	NIE; 1R	BAR; 1R	BAR; 1R	BAR; 1R	Did not participate				NIE; 2R	NIE; 1R	Did not participate												
