= Santa Susanna, Spain =

Santa Susanna
- Municipality
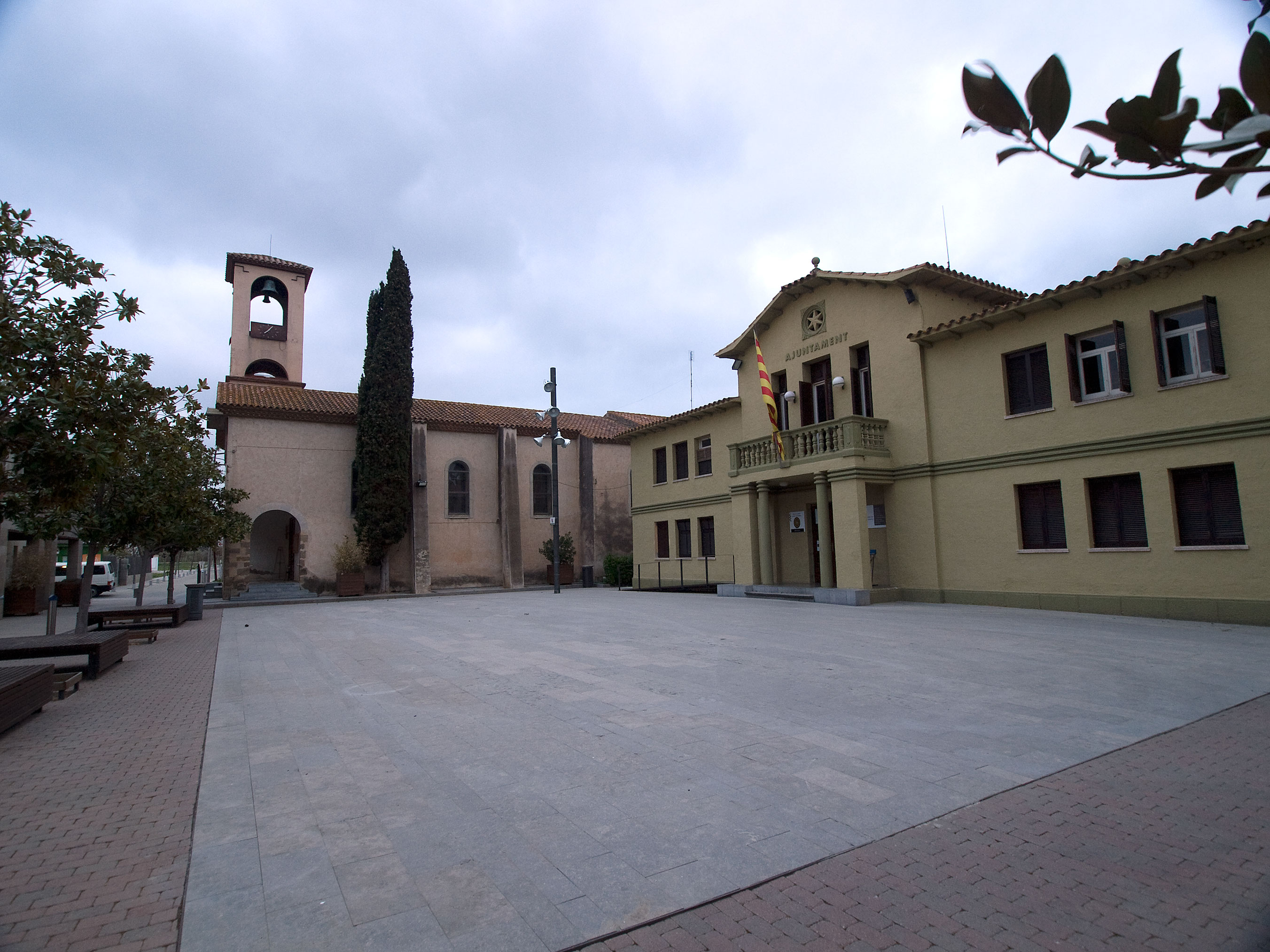
- Town Hall Square

- Coat of arms

- Location in Catalonia Santa Susanna (Spain)
- Coordinates: 41°38′13″N 2°42′29″E
- Country: Spain
- Community: Catalonia
- Province: Barcelona
- Comarca: Maresme

Government
  - Mayor: Joan Campolier Montsant (2015)

Area
  - Total: 12.6 km^{2} (4.9 sq mi)
- Elevation: 10 m (33 ft)

Population (2025-01-01)
  - Total: 4,099
  - Density: 325/km^{2} (843/sq mi)
- Demonym: Susannenc
- Website: www.stasusanna.org

Santa Susanna (Catalan pronunciation: [ˈsantə suˈzanːə]) is a municipality in the comarca of the Maresme in Catalonia, Spain. It is situated on the coast between Malgrat de Mar and Pineda de Mar. The main N-II road runs through the town.

There is train link direct from Sants station in Barcelona.
