= 2016 Austrian Darts Open =

Tournament information
- Dates: 10–12 June 2016
- Venue: Multiversum Schwechat
- Location: Vienna
- Country: Austria
- Organisation(s): PDC
- Format: Legs
- Prize fund: £115,000
- Winner's share: £25,000
- High checkout: 164 (England) Nigel Heydon (second round)

Champion(s)
- (England) Phil Taylor

The 2016 Austrian Darts Open was the fifth of ten PDC European Tour events on the 2016 PDC Pro Tour. The tournament took place at Multiversum Schwechat in Vienna, Austria, between 10–12 June 2016. It featured a field of 48 players and £115,000 in prize money, with £25,000 going to the winner.

Vincent van der Voort was the defending champion from the 2014 tournament, but lost in the first round to Steve Beaton.

Phil Taylor won the event after beating Michael Smith 6–4 in the final, in what was his first (and what would turn out to be his last) PDC European Tour event since the 2014 Gibraltar Darts Trophy.

== Prize money ==
The prize money of the European Tour events stays the same as last year.

| Stage (num. of players) | | Prize money |
|---|---|---|
| Winner | (1) | £25,000 |
| Runner-up | (1) | £10,000 |
| Semi-finalists | (2) | £5,000 |
| Quarter-finalists | (4) | £3,500 |
| Third round losers | (8) | £2,000 |
| Second round losers | (16) | £1,500 |
| First round losers | (16) | £1,000 |
| Total | £115,000 | |

== Qualification and format ==
The top 16 players from the PDC ProTour Order of Merit on 13 May automatically qualified for the event and were seeded in the second round. The remaining 32 places went to players from three qualifying events - 20 from the UK Qualifier (held in Coventry on 20 May), eight from the European Qualifier on 1 June and four from the Host Nation Qualifier on 9 June.

The following players will take part in the tournament:

Top 16
1. (Netherlands) Michael van Gerwen (quarter-finals)
2. (Scotland) Peter Wright (quarter-finals)
3. (England) Michael Smith (runner-up)
4. (England) Dave Chisnall (third round)
5. (Belgium) Kim Huybrechts (third round)
6. (England) Ian White (third round)
7. (Netherlands) Benito van de Pas (third round)
8. (Netherlands) Jelle Klaasen (third round)
9. (Austria) Mensur Suljović (second round)
10. (England) Terry Jenkins (semi-finals)
11. (Scotland) Robert Thornton (second round)
12. (England) Phil Taylor (winner)
13. (England) Stephen Bunting (quarter-finals)
14. (Australia) Simon Whitlock (second round)
15. (England) Alan Norris (third round)
16. (Wales) Gerwyn Price (second round)

UK Qualifier
- (England) Steve West (second round)
- (England) Mervyn King (first round)
- (England) Justin Pipe (first round)
- (Northern Ireland) Brendan Dolan (first round)
- (England) Chris Dobey (second round)
- (England) Wayne Jones (first round)
- (England) Josh Payne (second round)
- (England) Steve Beaton (third round)
- (England) James Richardson (second round)
- (Wales) Jonny Clayton (second round)
- (Australia) Kyle Anderson (semi-finals)
- (England) Jamie Caven (second round)
- (England) Nigel Heydon (quarter-finals)
- (England) Steve McNally (first round)
- (England) Darron Brown (first round)
- (England) Mark Frost (second round)
- (England) Wes Newton (first round)
- (England) Simon Stevenson (second round)
- (England) James Wilson (first round)
- (England) Ross Smith (first round)

European Qualifier
- (Netherlands) Ron Meulenkamp (third round)
- (Netherlands) Jermaine Wattimena (second round)
- (Netherlands) Jeffrey de Graaf (first round)
- (Netherlands) Vincent van der Voort (first round)
- (Netherlands) Mike Zuydwijk (first round)
- (Belgium) Dimitri Van den Bergh (second round)
- (Netherlands) Christian Kist (first round)
- (Netherlands) Jeffrey de Zwaan (first round)

Host Nation Qualifier
- (Austria) Nico Mandl (first round)
- (Austria) Zoran Lerchbacher (second round)
- (Austria) Rowby-John Rodriguez (second round)
- (Austria) Roxy-James Rodriguez (first round)

== Draw ==
First round (best of 11 legs); 10 June
(Wales) Jonny Clayton 93.38 | 6
(Austria) Nico Mandl 71.16 | 1
(Netherlands) Vincent van der Voort 90.47 | 1
(England) Steve Beaton 95.18 | 6
(Netherlands) Jeffrey de Zwaan 85.53 | 4
(Austria) Zoran Lerchbacher 87.31 | 6
(Australia) Kyle Anderson 97.05 | 6
(England) Ross Smith 96.51 | 4
(England) Chris Dobey 83.11 | 6
(England) Darron Brown 82.18 | 3
(England) Mervyn King 88.98 | 3
(England) Steve West 101.75 | 6
(England) Jamie Caven 97.41 | 6
(England) Justin Pipe 87.03 | 1
(Netherlands) Christian Kist 78.73 | 2
(England) James Richardson 90.91 | 6
(Northern Ireland) Brendan Dolan 83.70 | 3
(Netherlands) Jermaine Wattimena 96.31 | 6
(Austria) Rowby-John Rodriguez 87.40 | 6
(England) Steve McNally 77.71 | 1
(England) Wes Newton 88.33 | 3
(England) Josh Payne 84.21 | 6
(England) Wayne Jones 81.64 | 1
(Belgium) Dimitri Van den Bergh 85.15 | 6
(England) James Wilson 84.30 | 5
(England) Simon Stevenson 83.70 | 6
(England) Nigel Heydon 89.96 | 6
(Austria) Roxy-James Rodriguez 86.89 | 4
(England) Mark Frost 85.74 | 6
(Netherlands) Mike Zuydwijk 82.39 | 2
(Netherlands) Ron Meulenkamp 91.52 | 6
(Netherlands) Jeffrey de Graaf 85.15 | 3

Second round (best of 11 legs); 11 June
1 | (Netherlands) Michael van Gerwen 109.98 | 6
(Wales) Jonny Clayton 90.93 | 0
16 | (Wales) Gerwyn Price 79.10 | 3
(England) Steve Beaton 82.37 | 6
8 | (Netherlands) Jelle Klaasen 92.02 | 6
(Austria) Zoran Lerchbacher 75.31 | 0
9 | (Austria) Mensur Suljović 94.60 | 5
(Australia) Kyle Anderson 92.93 | 6
5 | (Belgium) Kim Huybrechts 95.52 | 6
(England) Chris Dobey 86.63 | 1
12 | (England) Phil Taylor 96.03 | 6
(England) Steve West 90.89 | 1
4 | (England) Dave Chisnall 98.74 | 6
(England) Jamie Caven 92.32 | 2
13 | (England) Stephen Bunting 89.61 | 6
(England) James Richardson 85.35 | 3
2 | (Scotland) Peter Wright 98.16 | 6
(Netherlands) Jermaine Wattimena 80.73 | 1
15 | (England) Alan Norris 96.31 | 6
(Austria) Rowby-John Rodriguez 80.11 | 1
7 | (Netherlands) Benito van de Pas 98.60 | 6
(England) Josh Payne 90.03 | 1
10 | (England) Terry Jenkins 87.68 | 6
(Belgium) Dimitri Van den Bergh 86.5 | 4
6 | (England) Ian White 92.90 | 6
(England) Simon Stevenson 89.11 | 4
11 | (Scotland) Robert Thornton 76.57 | 5
(England) Nigel Heydon 84.49 | 6
3 | (England) Michael Smith 89.58 | 6
(England) Mark Frost 84.02 | 5
14 | (Australia) Simon Whitlock 93.67 | 3
(Netherlands) Ron Meulenkamp 94.80 | 6

Third round (best of 11 legs); 12 June
1 | (Netherlands) van Gerwen 101.36 | 6
(England) Beaton 91.28 | 1
8 | (Netherlands) Klaasen 104.77 | 5
(Australia) Anderson 103.61 | 6
5 | (Belgium) Huybrechts 102.47 | 3
12 | (England) Taylor 101.73 | 6
4 | (England) Chisnall 94.42 | 2
13 | (England) Bunting 96.70 | 6
2 | (Scotland) Wright 95.46 | 6
15 | (England) Norris 102.82 | 5
7 | (Netherlands) van de Pas 96.95 | 3
10 | (England) Jenkins 93.07 | 6
6 | (England) White 88.88 | 0
(England) Heydon 92.97 | 6
3 | (England) M. Smith 87.65 | 6
(Netherlands) Meulenkamp 86.55 | 4

Quarter-finals (best of 11 legs); 12 June
1 | (Netherlands) van Gerwen 95.84 | 4
(Australia) Anderson 95.31 | 6
12 | (England) Taylor 100.80 | 6
13 | (England) Bunting 88.62 | 2
2 | (Scotland) Wright 85.72 | 4
10 | (England) Jenkins 91.44 | 6
(England) Heydon 91.64 | 5
3 | (England) M. Smith 94.42 | 6

Semi-finals (best of 11 legs); 12 June
(Australia) Anderson 105.14 | 5
12 | (England) Taylor 104.20 | 6
10 | (England) Jenkins 86.09 | 4
3 | (England) M. Smith 89.33 | 6

Final (best of 11 legs); 12 June
12 | (England) Taylor 97.34 | 6
3 | (England) M. Smith 92.82 | 4
