= PDC European Tour =

Darts competition

The PDC European Tour is a series of darts tournaments held across Europe organized by the Professional Darts Corporation. Starting in 2012 with five events, the number of events has steadily risen with eight held in 2013 and 2014, nine in 2015, 10 in 2016, 12 in 2017, 13 in both 2018 and 2019. There were 13 scheduled in 2020 (although that was reduced to four, owing to the COVID-19 pandemic). Only two events took place in 2021, with a return to 13 events in 2022, 2023 and 2024, then 14 in 2025 and 15 in 2026 and 2027.

These events see the top players on the PDC Order of Merit and PDC Pro Tour Order of Merit compete against players from a tour card holder qualifier and three different regional qualifiers. Currently the prize fund for each tournament is £235,000, with £35,000 going to the winner. These events differ from others held on the Pro Tour as they are played on one board in front of an audience. They are not televised, but are streamed on the PDC's subscription service.

Since 2016, the end of the European Tour marks the end of qualification for the European Championship, with the top 32 players on the European Tour Order of Merit comprising the field for the televised premier event.

== Locations ==
For most of the time since its inception in 2012, the majority of PDC European Tour events have been held in Germany. The only exception being in 2021, when owing to the COVID-19 pandemic, the only two events held that year took place in Hungary and Gibraltar. In 2025, half of the 14 events will be held in Germany.

Locations of European Tour venues in Germany.
Locations of European Tour venues in Benelux.
Locations of European Tour venues in Central Europe.
Other locations of European Tour venues in Europe.

== Prize money ==
Prize money for European Tour events rose to £230,000 in 2026. The prize fund has been divided as follows:

Years	Total payout	Winner	Runner-up	Semi finalists	Quarter finalists	Last 16	Last 32	Last 48	Last 64	Last 96	Ref.
2012	£82,100	£15,000	£7,500	£5,000	£3,000	£1,500	£1,000	—N/a	£200	£100	
2013	£100,000	£20,000	£10,000	£5,000	£3,000	£2,000	£1,000	—N/a	£500	—N/a	
2014	£100,000	£20,000	£8,000	£4,000	£3,000	£2,000	£1,250	£1,000	—N/a		
2015–2016	£115,000	£25,000	£10,000	£5,000	£3,500	£2,000	£1,500	£1,000	—N/a		
2017–2018	£135,000	£25,000	£10,000	£6,000	£4,000	£3,000	£2,000	£1,000	—N/a		
2019–2022	£140,000	£25,000	£10,000	£6,500	£5,000	£3,000	£2,000	£1,000	—N/a		
2023–2025	£175,000	£30,000	£12,000	£8,500	£6,000	£4,000	£2,500	£1,250	—N/a		
2026-present	£230,000	£35,000	£15,000	£10,000	£8,000	£5,000	£3,500	£2,000	—N/a		

== Active tournaments ==
=== Austrian Darts Open ===
Year	Date	Venue	Winner	Legs	Runner-Up	Ref.
2012	27–29 April	(Austria) Wiener Neustadt, Arena Nova	Justin Pipe (England)	6–3	(England) James Wade	
2013	31 May–2 June	(Austria) Wiener Neustadt, Arena Nova	Michael van Gerwen (Netherlands)	6–3	(England) Mervyn King	
2014	20–22 June	(Austria) Salzburg, Salzburgarena	Vincent van der Voort (Netherlands)	6–5	(England) Jamie Caven	
2016	10–12 June	(Austria) Vienna, Multiversum Schwechat	Phil Taylor (England)	6–4	(England) Michael Smith	
2017	23–25 June	(Austria) Vienna, Multiversum Schwechat	Michael van Gerwen (Netherlands)	6–5	(England) Michael Smith	
2018	20–22 April	(Austria) Graz, Premstättner Halle	Jonny Clayton (Wales)	8–5	(Wales) Gerwyn Price	
2019	3–5 May	(Austria) Graz, Premstättner Halle	Michael van Gerwen (Netherlands)	8–7	(England) Ian White	
2022	29 April–1 May	(Austria) Graz, Premstättner Halle	Michael van Gerwen (Netherlands)	8–5	(Netherlands) Danny Noppert	
2023	21–23 April	(Austria) Graz, Premstättner Halle	Jonny Clayton (Wales)	8–6	(Northern Ireland) Josh Rock	
2024	26–28 April	(Austria) Graz, Premstättner Halle	Luke Littler	8–4	Joe Cullen	
2025	25–27 April	(Austria) Graz, Premstättner Halle	Martin Schindler	8–4	Ross Smith	
2026	8–10 May	(Austria) Graz, Stadthalle Graz	Josh Rock	8–6	Kevin Doets	
2027	7–9 May	(Austria) Graz, Stadthalle Graz				

=== European Darts Trophy ===
Year	Date	Venue	Winner	Legs	Runner-Up	Ref.
2013	30 March–1 April	(Germany) Sindelfingen, Glaspalast	Wes Newton (England)	6–5	(Australia) Paul Nicholson	
2014	19–21 September	(Germany) Leipzig, Kohlrabizirkus	Michael Smith (England)	6–5	(Netherlands) Michael van Gerwen	
2015	11–13 September	(Germany) Mülheim, RWE-Sporthalle	Michael Smith (England)	6–2	(Netherlands) Michael van Gerwen	
2016	9–11 September	(Germany) Mülheim, RWE-Sporthalle	Michael van Gerwen (Netherlands)	6–5	(Austria) Mensur Suljović	
2017	13–15 October	(Germany) Göttingen, Lokhalle	Michael van Gerwen (Netherlands)	6–4	(England) Rob Cross	
2018	12–14 October	(Germany) Göttingen, Lokhalle	Michael van Gerwen (Netherlands)	8–3	(England) James Wade	
2025	21–23 March	(Germany) Göttingen, Lokhalle	Nathan Aspinall (England)	8–4	(England) Ryan Joyce	
2026	13-15 March	(Germany) Göttingen, Lokhalle	Wessel Nijman (Netherlands)	8–3	(Wales) Gerwyn Price	
2027	16–18 April	(Germany) Göttingen, Lokhalle				

=== European Darts Grand Prix ===
Year	Date	Venue	Winner	Legs	Runner-up	Ref.
2014	5–7 September	(Germany) Sindelfingen, Glaspalast	Mervyn King (England)	6–5	(England) Michael Smith	
2015	16–18 October	(Germany) Sindelfingen, Glaspalast	Kim Huybrechts (Belgium)	6–5	(Scotland) Peter Wright	
2016	16–18 September	(Germany) Sindelfingen, Glaspalast	Michael van Gerwen (Netherlands)	6–2	(Scotland) Peter Wright	
2017	5–7 May	(Germany) Sindelfingen, Glaspalast	Peter Wright (Scotland)	6–0	(Netherlands) Michael van Gerwen	
2018	4–6 May	(Germany) Sindelfingen, Glaspalast	Michael van Gerwen (Netherlands)	8–3	(England) James Wade	
2019	10–12 May	(Germany) Sindelfingen, Glaspalast	Ian White (England)	8–7	(Scotland) Peter Wright	
2020	16–18 October	(Germany) Sindelfingen, Glaspalast	José de Sousa (Portugal)	8–4	(Netherlands) Michael van Gerwen	
2022	20–22 May	(Germany) Stuttgart, Hanns-Martin-Schleyer-Halle	Luke Humphries (England)	8–7	(England) Rob Cross	
2023	26–28 May	(Germany) Sindelfingen, Glaspalast	Rob Cross (England)	8–6	(England) Luke Humphries	
2024	19–21 April	(Germany) Sindelfingen, Glaspalast	Gary Anderson (Scotland)	8–6	(England) Ross Smith	
2025	2–4 May	(Germany) Sindelfingen, Glaspalast	Gary Anderson (Scotland)	8–0	(England) Andrew Gilding	
2026	17–19 April	(Germany) Sindelfingen, Glaspalast	Gerwyn Price (Wales)	8–6	(England) Ross Smith	
2027	2–4 April	(Germany) Sindelfingen, Glaspalast				

=== International Darts Open ===
Year	Date	Venue	Winner	Legs	Runner-up	Ref.
2015	19–21 June	(Germany) Riesa, SACHSENarena	Michael Smith (England)	6–3	(Netherlands) Benito van de Pas	
2016	2–4 September	(Germany) Riesa, SACHSENarena	Mensur Suljović (Austria)	6–5	(Belgium) Kim Huybrechts	
2017	22–24 September	(Germany) Riesa, SACHSENarena	Peter Wright (Scotland)	6–5	(Belgium) Kim Huybrechts	
2018	14–16 September	(Germany) Riesa, SACHSENarena	Gerwyn Price (Wales)	8–3	(Australia) Simon Whitlock	
2019	13–15 September	(Germany) Riesa, SACHSENarena	Gerwyn Price (Wales)	8–6	(England) Rob Cross	
2020	23–25 October	(Germany) Riesa, SACHSENarena	Joe Cullen (England)	8–5	(Netherlands) Michael van Gerwen	
2022	25–27 February	(Germany) Riesa, SACHSENarena	Gerwyn Price (Wales)	8–4	(Scotland) Peter Wright	
2023	31 March–2 April	(Germany) Riesa, SACHSENarena	Gerwyn Price (Wales)	8–4	(Netherlands) Michael van Gerwen	
2024	12–14 April	(Germany) Riesa, SACHSENarena	Martin Schindler	8–5	Gerwyn Price	
2025	4–6 April	(Germany) Riesa, SACHSENarena	Stephen Bunting (England)	8–5	(England) Nathan Aspinall	
2026	22–24 May	(Germany) Riesa, SACHSENarena	Ross Smith (England)	8–3	(England) Ryan Searle	
2027	26–28 February	(Germany) Riesa, SACHSENarena				

=== German Darts Open ===
Year	Date	Venue	Winner	Legs	Runner-Up	Ref.
2017	21–23 April	(Germany) Saarbrücken, Saarlandhalle	Peter Wright (Scotland)	6–5	(Netherlands) Benito van de Pas	
2018	13–15 April	(Germany) Saarbrücken, Saarlandhalle	Max Hopp (Germany)	8–7	(England) Michael Smith	
2019	26–28 April	(Germany) Saarbrücken, Saarlandhalle	Michael van Gerwen (Netherlands)	8–3	(England) Ian White	
2022	9–11 September	(Germany) Jena, Sparkassen-Arena	Peter Wright (Scotland)	8–6	(Belgium) Dimitri Van den Bergh	
2023	8–10 September	(Germany) Jena, Sparkassen-Arena	Krzysztof Ratajski (Poland)	8–3	(England) Stephen Bunting	
2027	9–11 July	(Germany) Leverkusen, Ostermann-Arena				

=== German Darts Grand Prix ===
Year	Date	Venue	Winner	Legs	Runner-Up	Ref.
2017	8–10 September	(Germany) Mannheim, Maimarkthalle	Michael van Gerwen (Netherlands)	6–3	(England) Rob Cross	
2018	31 March–2 April	(Germany) Munich, Kulturhalle Zenith	Michael van Gerwen (Netherlands)	8–5	(Scotland) Peter Wright	
2019	20–22 April	(Germany) Munich, Kulturhalle Zenith	Michael van Gerwen (Netherlands)	8–3	(Australia) Simon Whitlock	
2022	16–18 April	(Germany) Munich, Kulturhalle Zenith	Luke Humphries (England)	8–2	(England) Martin Lukeman	
2023	8–10 April	(Germany) Munich, Kulturhalle Zenith	Michael Smith (England)	8–5	(England) Nathan Aspinall	
2024	30 March–1 April	(Germany) Munich, Kulturhalle Zenith	Luke Humphries	8–1	Michael van Gerwen	
2025	19–21 April	(Germany) Munich, Kulturhalle Zenith	Michael van Gerwen	8–5	Gian van Veen	
2026	4–6 April	(Germany) Munich, Kulturhalle Zenith	Nathan Aspinall	8–5	Danny Noppert	
2027	27–29 March	(Germany) Munich, Kulturhalle Zenith				

=== Dutch Darts Championship ===
Year	Date	Venue	Winner	Legs	Runner-Up	Ref.
2018	7–9 September	(Netherlands) Maastricht, MECC Maastricht	Ian White (England)	8–5	(England) Ricky Evans	
2022	27–29 May	(Netherlands) Zwolle, IJsselhallen	Michael Smith (England)	8–7	(Netherlands) Danny Noppert	
2023	28–30 April	(Netherlands) Leeuwarden, WTC Expo	Dave Chisnall (England)	8–5	(England) Luke Humphries	
2024	24–26 May	(Netherlands) Rosmalen, Autotron	Josh Rock	8–4	Jonny Clayton	
2025	23–25 May	(Netherlands) Rosmalen, Autotron	Jonny Clayton	8–6	Niko Springer	
2026	16–18 October	(Netherlands) Maastricht, MECC Maastricht	Niels Zonneveld (Netherlands)	8–5	(Netherlands) Danny Noppert	
2027	15–17 October	(Netherlands) Maastricht, MECC Maastricht				

=== Czech Darts Open ===
Year	Date	Venue	Winner	Legs	Runner-Up	Ref.
2019	28–30 June	(Czech Republic) Prague, PVA EXPO	Jamie Hughes (England)	8–3	(England) Stephen Bunting	
2022	13–15 May	(Czech Republic) Prague, Královka Arena	Luke Humphries (England)	8–5	(England) Rob Cross	
2023	12–14 May	(Czech Republic) Prague, PVA EXPO	Peter Wright (Scotland)	8–6	(England) Dave Chisnall	
2024	18–20 October	(Czech Republic) Prague, PVA EXPO	Luke Humphries (England)	8–1	(Belgium) Kim Huybrechts	
2025	5–7 September	(Czech Republic) Prague, PVA EXPO	Luke Humphries (England)	8–5	(Northern Ireland) Josh Rock	
2026	4–6 September	(Czech Republic) Prague, PVA EXPO	Luke Littler (England)	8–6	(England) Luke Humphries	
2027	21–23 May	(Czech Republic) Prague, PVA EXPO				

=== Hungarian Darts Trophy ===
Year	Date	Venue	Winner	Legs	Runner-Up	Ref.
2021	3–5 September	(Hungary) Budapest, László Papp Budapest Sports Arena	Gerwyn Price (Wales)	8–2	(England) Michael Smith	
2022	2–4 September	(Hungary) Budapest, BOK Sportcsarnok	Joe Cullen (England)	8–2	(Republic of Ireland) William O'Connor	
2023	22–24 September	(Hungary) Budapest, MVM Dome	Dave Chisnall (England)	8–7	(England) Luke Humphries	
2024	20–22 September	(Hungary) Budapest, MVM Dome	Michael van Gerwen (Netherlands)	8–7	(Netherlands) Gian van Veen	
2025	19–21 September	(Hungary) Budapest, MVM Dome	Niko Springer (Germany)	8–7	(Netherlands) Danny Noppert	
2026	28–30 August	(Hungary) Budapest, MVM Dome	Ross Smith (England)	8–2	(Scotland) Gary Anderson	
2027	8–10 October	(Hungary) Budapest, MVM Dome				

=== Belgian Darts Open ===
Year	Date	Venue	Winner	Legs	Runner-Up	Ref.
2022	23–25 September	(Belgium) Wieze, Oktoberhallen	Dave Chisnall (England)	8–6	(England) Andrew Gilding	
2023	5–7 May	(Belgium) Wieze, Oktoberhallen	Michael van Gerwen (Netherlands)	8–6	(England) Luke Humphries	
2024	8–10 March	(Belgium) Wieze, Oktoberhallen	Luke Littler (England)	8–7	(England) Rob Cross	
2025	7–9 March	(Belgium) Wieze, Oktoberhallen	Luke Littler (England)	8–5	(Belgium) Mike De Decker	
2026	20–22 March	(Belgium) Wieze, Oktoberhallen	Luke Humphries (England)	8–6	(Wales) Jonny Clayton	
2027	3–5 September	(Belgium) Ghent, Flanders Expo				

=== Baltic Sea Darts Open ===
Year	Date	Venue	Winner	Legs	Runner-Up	Ref.
2023	24–26 February	(Germany) Kiel, Wunderino Arena	Dave Chisnall (England)	8–5	(England) Luke Humphries	
2024	10–12 May	(Germany) Kiel, Wunderino Arena	Rob Cross	8–6	Luke Humphries	
2025	11–13 July	(Germany) Kiel, Wunderino Arena	Gerwyn Price	8–3	Gary Anderson	
2026	29–31 May	(Germany) Kiel, Wunderino Arena	Luke Woodhouse	8–4	Ryan Joyce	
2027	12–14 February	(Germany) Kiel, Wunderino Arena				

=== Swiss Darts Trophy ===
Year	Date	Venue	Winner	Legs	Runner-Up	Ref.
2024	27–29 September	(Switzerland) Basel, St. Jakobshalle	Martin Schindler (Germany)	8–7	(England) Ryan Searle	
2025	26–28 September	(Switzerland) Basel, St. Jakobshalle	Stephen Bunting (England)	8–3	(England) Luke Woodhouse	
2026	9–11 October	(Switzerland) Basel, St. Jakobshalle	Jonny Clayton (Wales)	8–4	(England) Luke Humphries	
2027	10–12 September	(Switzerland) Basel, St. Jakobshalle				

=== Poland Darts Open ===
Year	Date	Venue	Winner	Legs	Runner-Up	Ref.
2026	20–22 February	(Poland) Kraków, EXPO Kraków	(England) Luke Littler	8–4	(Netherlands) Gian van Veen	
2027	19–21 February	(Poland) Kraków, EXPO Kraków				

=== Slovak Darts Open ===
Year	Date	Venue	Winner	Legs	Runner-Up	Ref.
2026	19–21 June	(Slovakia) Bratislava, Incheba	(Netherlands) Wessel Nijman	8–3	(England) Rob Cross	
2027	27–29 August	(Slovakia) Bratislava, Incheba				

=== Darts Grand Prix de France ===
Year	Date	Venue	Winner	Legs	Runner-Up	Ref.
2027	19–21 March	(France) Liévin, Arena Stade Couvert				

== Former tournaments ==
=== UK Masters ===
Year	Date	Venue	Winner	Legs	Runner-Up	Ref.
2013	8–10 March	(England) Minehead, Butlin's Minehead	John Part (Canada)	6–4	(England) Stuart Kellett	

=== German Darts Masters ===
Year	Date	Venue	Winner	Legs	Runner-Up	Ref.
2012	7–9 September	(Germany) Sindelfingen, Glaspalast	Adrian Lewis (England)	6–3	(England) Ian White	
2013	20–22 September	(Germany) Sindelfingen, Glaspalast	Steve Beaton (England)	6–5	(England) Mervyn King	
2014	19–21 April	(Germany) Berlin, Maritim Hotel	Phil Taylor (England)	6–4	(Netherlands) Michael van Gerwen	
2015	4–6 April	(Germany) Munich, Ballhausforum	Michael van Gerwen (Netherlands)	6–5	(Scotland) John Henderson	
2016	26–28 March	(Germany) Munich, Ballhausforum	Michael van Gerwen (Netherlands)	6–4	(Scotland) Peter Wright	
2017	15–17 April	(Germany) Jena, Sparkassen-Arena	Michael van Gerwen (Netherlands)	6–2	(Netherlands) Jelle Klaasen	

=== Danish Darts Open ===
Year	Date	Venue	Winner	Legs	Runner-Up	Ref.
2018	22–24 June	(Denmark) Copenhagen, Brøndbyhallen	Mensur Suljović (Austria)	8–3	(Australia) Simon Whitlock	
2019	14–16 June	(Denmark) Copenhagen, Brøndbyhallen	Dave Chisnall (England)	8–3	(England) Chris Dobey	

=== Austrian Darts Championship ===
Year	Date	Venue	Winner	Legs	Runner-Up	Ref.
2019	30 August–1 September	(Austria) Vienna, Multiversum Schwechat	Mensur Suljović (Austria)	8–7	(Netherlands) Michael van Gerwen	

=== Dutch Darts Masters ===
Year	Date	Venue	Winner	Legs	Runner-Up	Ref.
2012	26–28 October	(Netherlands) Nuland, Van Der Valk Hotel	Simon Whitlock (Australia)	6–1	(Australia) Paul Nicholson	
2013	25–27 October	(Netherlands) Veldhoven, NH Hotel Koningshof	Kim Huybrechts (Belgium)	6–3	(Northern Ireland) Brendan Dolan	
2014	14–16 February	(Netherlands) Veldhoven, NH Hotel Koningshof	Michael van Gerwen (Netherlands)	6–4	(England) Mervyn King	
2015	5–7 June	(Netherlands) Venray, Evenementenhal	Michael van Gerwen (Netherlands)	6–0	(England) Justin Pipe	
2016	12–14 February	(Netherlands) Venray, Evenementenhal	Michael van Gerwen (Netherlands)	6–2	(Northern Ireland) Daryl Gurney	
2017	1–3 September	(Netherlands) Maastricht, MECC Maastricht	Michael van Gerwen (Netherlands)	6–1	(England) Steve Beaton	
2018	11–13 May	(Netherlands) Zwolle, IJsselhallen	Michael van Gerwen (Netherlands)	8–5	(Republic of Ireland) Steve Lennon	
2019	24–26 May	(Netherlands) Zwolle, IJsselhallen	Ian White (England)	8–7	(Netherlands) Michael van Gerwen	

=== Belgian Darts Championship ===
Year	Date	Venue	Winner	Legs	Runner-Up	Ref.
2020	28 February–1 March	(Belgium) Hasselt, Expo Hasselt	Gerwyn Price (Wales)	8–3	(England) Michael Smith	

=== Gibraltar Darts Trophy ===
Year	Date	Venue	Winner	Legs	Runner-Up	Ref.
2013	28–30 June	Gibraltar, Victoria Stadium	Phil Taylor (England)	6–1	(Wales) Jamie Lewis	
2014	27–29 June	Gibraltar, Victoria Stadium	James Wade (England)	6–4	(England) Steve Beaton	
2015	20–22 March	Gibraltar, Victoria Stadium	Michael van Gerwen (Netherlands)	6–3	(England) Terry Jenkins	
2016	6–8 May	Gibraltar, Victoria Stadium	Michael van Gerwen (Netherlands)	6–2	(England) Dave Chisnall	
2017	12–14 May	Gibraltar, Victoria Stadium	Michael Smith (England)	6–4	(Austria) Mensur Suljović	
2018	8–10 June	Gibraltar, Victoria Stadium	Michael van Gerwen (Netherlands)	8–3	(England) Adrian Lewis	
2019	27–29 September	Gibraltar, Victoria Stadium	Krzysztof Ratajski (Poland)	8–2	(England) Dave Chisnall	
2021	24–26 September	Gibraltar, Europa Sports Park	Gerwyn Price (Wales)	8–0	(Austria) Mensur Suljović	
2022	14–16 October	Gibraltar, Victoria Stadium	Damon Heta (Australia)	8–7	(Scotland) Peter Wright	

=== European Darts Matchplay ===
Year	Date	Venue	Winner	Legs	Runner-Up	Ref.
2015	18–20 September	(Austria) Innsbruck, Olympiahalle	Michael van Gerwen (Netherlands)	6–4	(England) Dave Chisnall	
2016	13–15 May	(Germany) Hamburg, Inselparkhalle	James Wade (England)	6–5	(England) Dave Chisnall	
2017	9–11 June	(Germany) Hamburg, Edel-optics.de Arena	Michael van Gerwen (Netherlands)	6–3	(Austria) Mensur Suljović	
2018	29 June–1 July	(Germany) Hamburg, Edel-optics.de Arena	Michael van Gerwen (Netherlands)	8–2	(Republic of Ireland) William O'Connor	
2019	6–8 September	(Germany) Mannheim, Maimarkthalle	Joe Cullen (England)	8–5	(Netherlands) Michael van Gerwen	
2022	1–3 July	(Germany) Trier, Trier Arena	Luke Humphries (England)	8–7	(Austria) Rowby-John Rodriguez	
2023	30 June–2 July	(Germany) Trier, Trier Arena	Luke Humphries (England)	8–7	(Netherlands) Dirk van Duijvenbode	

=== German Darts Open ===
Year	Date	Venue	Winner	Legs	Runner-Up	Ref.
2017	21–23 April	(Germany) Saarbrücken, Saarlandhalle	Peter Wright (Scotland)	6–5	(Netherlands) Benito van de Pas	
2018	13–15 April	(Germany) Saarbrücken, Saarlandhalle	Max Hopp (Germany)	8–7	(England) Michael Smith	
2019	26–28 April	(Germany) Saarbrücken, Saarlandhalle	Michael van Gerwen (Netherlands)	8–3	(England) Ian White	
2022	9–11 September	(Germany) Jena, Sparkassen-Arena	Peter Wright (Scotland)	8–6	(Belgium) Dimitri Van den Bergh	
2023	8–10 September	(Germany) Jena, Sparkassen-Arena	Krzysztof Ratajski (Poland)	8–3	(England) Stephen Bunting	

=== German Darts Championship ===
Year	Date	Venue	Winner	Legs	Runner-Up	Ref.
2012	22–24 June	(Germany) Berlin, Tempodrom	Phil Taylor (England)	6–2	(England) Dave Chisnall	
2013	6–8 September	(Germany) Hildesheim, Halle 39	Dave Chisnall (England)	6–2	(Scotland) Peter Wright	
2014	31 January–2 February	(Germany) Hildesheim, Halle 39	Gary Anderson (Scotland)	6–5	(England) Justin Pipe	
2015	13–15 February	(Germany) Hildesheim, Halle 39	Michael van Gerwen (Netherlands)	6–2	(Scotland) Gary Anderson	
2016	14–16 October	(Germany) Hildesheim, Halle 39	Alan Norris (England)	6–5	(Netherlands) Jelle Klaasen	
2017	24–26 March	(Germany) Hildesheim, Halle 39	Peter Wright (Scotland)	6–3	(Netherlands) Michael van Gerwen	
2018	31 August–2 September	(Germany) Hildesheim, Halle 39	Michael van Gerwen (Netherlands)	8–6	(England) James Wilson	
2019	29–31 March	(Germany) Hildesheim, Halle 39	Daryl Gurney (Northern Ireland)	8–6	(England) Ricky Evans	
2020	25–27 September	(Germany) Hildesheim, Halle 39	Devon Petersen (South Africa)	8–3	(Wales) Jonny Clayton	
2022	11–13 March	(Germany) Hildesheim, Halle 39	Michael van Gerwen (Netherlands)	8–5	(England) Rob Cross	
2023	13–15 October	(Germany) Hildesheim, Halle 39	Ricardo Pietreczko (Germany)	8–4	(Scotland) Peter Wright	
2024	30 August–1 September	(Germany) Hildesheim, Halle 39	Peter Wright (Scotland)	8–5	(England) Luke Littler	
2025	17–19 October	(Germany) Hildesheim, Halle 39	Nathan Aspinall (England)	8–6	(Netherlands) Dirk van Duijvenbode	

=== European Darts Open ===
Year	Date	Venue	Winner	Legs	Runner-Up	Ref.
2012	6–8 July	(Germany) Düsseldorf, Maritim Hotel	Raymond van Barneveld (Netherlands)	6–4	(England) Dave Chisnall	
2013	17–19 May	(Germany) Düsseldorf, Maritim Hotel	Michael van Gerwen (Netherlands)	6–2	(Australia) Simon Whitlock	
2014	11–13 July	(Germany) Düsseldorf, Maritim Hotel	Peter Wright (Scotland)	6–2	(Australia) Simon Whitlock	
2015	10–12 July	(Germany) Düsseldorf, Maritim Hotel	Robert Thornton (Scotland)	6–2	(Belgium) Kim Huybrechts	
2016	29–31 July	(Germany) Düsseldorf, Maritim Hotel	Michael van Gerwen (Netherlands)	6–5	(Scotland) Peter Wright	
2017	30 June–2 July	(Germany) Leverkusen, Ostermann-Arena	Peter Wright (Scotland)	6–2	(England) Mervyn King	
2018	23–25 March	(Germany) Leverkusen, Ostermann-Arena	Michael van Gerwen (Netherlands)	8–7	(Scotland) Peter Wright	
2019	22–24 March	(Germany) Leverkusen, Ostermann-Arena	Michael van Gerwen (Netherlands)	8–6	(England) Rob Cross	
2022	6–8 May	(Germany) Leverkusen, Ostermann-Arena	Michael van Gerwen (Netherlands)	8–5	(Belgium) Dimitri Van den Bergh	
2023	24–26 March	(Germany) Leverkusen, Ostermann-Arena	Gerwyn Price (Wales)	8–7	(Netherlands) Dirk van Duijvenbode	
2024	21–23 June	(Germany) Leverkusen, Ostermann-Arena	Dave Chisnall	8–6	Ross Smith	
2025	30 May–1 June	(Germany) Leverkusen, Ostermann-Arena	Nathan Aspinall	8–6	Damon Heta	
2026	10–12 July	(Germany) Leverkusen, Ostermann-Arena	Krzysztof Ratajski	8–6	Jermaine Wattimena	

=== Flanders Darts Trophy ===
Year	Date	Venue	Winner	Legs	Runner-Up	Ref.
2024	6–8 September	(Belgium) Antwerp, Antwerp Expo	Dave Chisnall (England)	8–6	(Germany) Ricardo Pietreczko	
2025	29–31 August	(Belgium) Antwerp, Antwerp Expo	Luke Littler (England)	8–7	(Northern Ireland) Josh Rock	
2026	11–13 September	(Belgium) Antwerp, Antwerp Expo	James Wade (England)	8–4	(England) Ross Smith	

== Records and statistics ==
=== Total finalist appearances ===
As of 18 October 2026

Rank	Player	Winner	Runner-up	Finals
1	Michael van Gerwen	38	12	50
2	Gerwyn Price	10	3	13
3	Peter Wright	9	11	20
4	Luke Humphries	9	8	17
5	Dave Chisnall	8	7	15
6	Michael Smith	6	6	12
7	Luke Littler	6	1	7
8	Jonny Clayton	4	3	7
9	Nathan Aspinall	4	2	6
10	Phil Taylor	4	0	4
11	Mensur Suljović	3	4	7
12	Gary Anderson	3	3	6
12	James Wade	3	3	6
12	Ian White	3	3	6
15	Joe Cullen	3	1	4
16	Krzysztof Ratajski	3	0	3
16	Martin Schindler	3	0	3
18	Rob Cross	2	9	11
19	Ross Smith	2	5	7
19	Kim Huybrechts	2	4	6
21	Josh Rock	2	3	5
22	Stephen Bunting	2	2	4
23	Wessel Nijman	2	0	2
24	Simon Whitlock	1	5	6
25	Mervyn King	1	4	5
26	Steve Beaton	1	2	3
26	Justin Pipe	1	2	3
28	Daryl Gurney	1	1	2
28	Damon Heta	1	1	2
28	Adrian Lewis	1	1	2
28	Ricardo Pietreczko	1	1	2
28	Niko Springer	1	1	2
28	Luke Woodhouse	1	1	2
34	José de Sousa	1	0	1
34	Max Hopp	1	0	1
34	Jamie Hughes	1	0	1
34	Wes Newton	1	0	1
34	Alan Norris	1	0	1
34	John Part	1	0	1
34	Devon Petersen	1	0	1
34	Robert Thornton	1	0	1
34	Raymond van Barneveld	1	0	1
34	Vincent van der Voort	1	0	1
34	Niels Zonneveld	1	0	1
45	Danny Noppert	0	5	5
46	Dirk van Duijvenbode	0	3	3
46	Gian van Veen	0	3	3
48	Ricky Evans	0	2	2
48	Andrew Gilding	0	2	2
48	Ryan Joyce	0	2	2
48	Jelle Klaasen	0	2	2
48	Paul Nicholson	0	2	2
48	William O'Connor	0	2	2
48	Ryan Searle	0	2	2
48	Benito van de Pas	0	2	2
48	Dimitri Van den Bergh	0	2	2
57	Jamie Caven	0	1	1
57	Mike De Decker	0	1	1
57	Chris Dobey	0	1	1
57	Kevin Doets	0	1	1
57	Brendan Dolan	0	1	1
57	John Henderson	0	1	1
57	Terry Jenkins	0	1	1
57	Stuart Kellett	0	1	1
57	Steve Lennon	0	1	1
57	Jamie Lewis	0	1	1
57	Martin Lukeman	0	1	1
57	Rowby-John Rodriguez	0	1	1
57	Jermaine Wattimena	0	1	1
57	James Wilson	0	1	1

=== Nine-dart finishes ===
Twenty-one nine-darters have been thrown on the European Tour. The first one was thrown by Michael Smith in the inaugural tournament in Austria in 2012.

After a gap of just over 5 years between nine-darters, the so-called "Curse of Ross Smith" hung over the European Tour, named after Smith, who got his in the 2013 Gibraltar Darts Trophy. Since Michael van Gerwen broke the curse at the 2018 European Darts Matchplay, there have been fourteen more nine-dart finishes.

Player	Year (+ Round)	Method	Opponent	Result
(England) Michael Smith	2012 Austrian Darts Open, 1st Round	3 x T20; 3 x T20; T20, T19, D12	(England) Jamie Caven	Won
(Australia) Simon Whitlock	2012 Austrian Darts Open, 2nd Round	3 x T20; 3 x T20; T20, T15, D18	(England) Joe Cullen	Won
(England) Colin Lloyd	2012 German Darts Championship, 1st Round	3 x T20; 2 x T20, T17; 2 x T20, D15	(England) Alex Roy	Won
(Wales) Mark Webster	2012 German Darts Masters, 1st Round	3 x T20; 3 x T20; T20, T19, D12	(Germany) Andree Welge	Lost
(England) Ian White	2012 German Darts Masters, 3rd Round	3 x T20; 3 x T20; T20, T19, D12	(England) Andy Hamilton	Won
(England) Ross Smith	2013 Gibraltar Darts Trophy, 2nd Round	3 x T20; 3 x T20; T20, T15, D18	(England) Adrian Lewis	Lost
(Netherlands) Michael van Gerwen	2018 European Darts Matchplay, 2nd Round	3 x T20; 2 x T20, T19; 2 x T20, D12	(England) Ryan Joyce	Won
(Netherlands) Michael van Gerwen	2019 European Darts Open, Semi-Final	3 x T20; T20, 2 x T19; T19, Bull, D20	(Austria) Mensur Suljović	Won
(England) James Wade	2019 German Darts Championship, 3rd Round	3 x T20; 3 x T20; T20, T19, D12	(England) Darren Webster	Lost
(England) Steve Beaton	2019 German Darts Open, 1st Round	2 x T20, T19; 3 x T20; 2 x T20, D12	(England) Kirk Shepherd	Won
(Wales) Gerwyn Price	2019 Czech Darts Open, 2nd Round	3 x T20; 3 x T20; T20, T19, D12	(England) Glen Durrant	Won
(England) Dave Chisnall	2019 Gibraltar Darts Trophy, Quarter-Final	3 x T20; 3 x T20; T20, T19, D12	(England) James Wade	Won
(England) Dave Chisnall	2022 Belgian Darts Open, Semi-Final	3 x T20; 3 x T20; T20, T19, D12	(Netherlands) Danny Noppert	Won
(England) Luke Humphries	2023 Hungarian Darts Trophy, Final	3 x T20; 3 x T20; T20, T19, D12	(England) Dave Chisnall	Lost
(England) Scott Waites	2023 German Darts Championship, 1st Round	3 x T20; 3 x T20; T20, T19, D12	(England) George Killington	Lost
(England) Luke Littler	2024 Belgian Darts Open, Final	2x T20, T19; 3 x T20; T20, T20, D12	(England) Rob Cross	Won
(England) Luke Humphries	2024 Baltic Sea Darts Open, Final	3 x T20; 3 x T20; T20, T19, D12	(England) Rob Cross	Lost
(England) Ross Smith	2024 Dutch Darts Championship, 2nd Round	T20; 2 x T19; 3x T20; T20, T17, D18	(Belgium) Dimitri Van den Bergh	Lost
(Norway) Cor Dekker	2024 Hungarian Darts Trophy, 2nd Round	3 x T20; 3 x T20; T20, T15, D18	(England) Stephen Bunting	Lost
(Netherlands) Michael van Gerwen	2024 Hungarian Darts Trophy, 2nd Round	3 x T20; 3 x T20; T20, T19, D12	(England) Martin Lukeman	Won
(Germany) Martin Schindler	2024 Hungarian Darts Trophy, 3rd Round	3 x T20; 3 x T20; T20, T19, D12	(England) Stephen Bunting	Lost
(Netherlands) Michael van Gerwen	2025 German Darts Grand Prix, 3rd Round	3 x T20; 3 x T20; T20, T19, D12	(England) Ryan Searle	Won
(Netherlands) Dirk van Duijvenbode	2025 German Darts Championship, 2nd Round	3 x T20; 3x T20; T17, T18, D18	Karel Sedláček	Won
(Netherlands) Gian van Veen	2026 Poland Darts Open, Final	3 x T20; 3 x T20; T20, T19, D12	Luke Littler	Lost
(Spain) Cristo Reyes	2026 Austrian Darts Open, 2nd Round	3 x T20; 3 x T20; T20, T19, D12	(Australia) Damon Heta	Won
