= Kimberley (surname) =

- Language: English

Other names
- Variant form: Kimberly
- See also: Kimberley, Kimberly (given names)

Kimberley is a surname in the English language. A variant form of the surname is Kimberly.

Kimberley is derived from any of several places in England named Kimberley. However, several such places have differing etymologies. For example, the Kimberly in Norfolk is derived from two Old English elements: the first is the feminine personal name Cyneburg; the second element is lēah, meaning "wood" or "clearing". The Kimberly in Nottinghamshire is similarly derived, although the personal name is Cynemær. Likewise the Kimberly in Warwickshire is derived from the personal name Cynebold.

An early record of the surname is de Chineburlai, in 1161; and de Kynmerley, in 1300.

The Earls of Kimberley derived their title from the place name in Norfolk. Their name gave rise to the like-named place Kimberley, in Northern Cape, South Africa. From this South African place name comes the modern given names Kimberley and Kimberly.

Notable people with the surname include:

- Anna Kimberley (born 1995), English professional squash player
- Barry Kimberley (born 1957), Australian rules footballer
- Cindy Kimberly Rubira Adsuar (born 1998), commonly known as Cindy Kimberly, Spanish and Dutch influencer and model
- Eleazer Kimberly (1639–1709), Secretary of the State of Connecticut
- Gail Kimberly (1927–2011), American writer
- John A. Kimberly (1838–1928), American manufacturing executive, a founder of Kimberly-Clark Corporation
- Jonathan Kimberley (1651–1720), Dean of Lichfield from 1713 until his death
- Lawrence Kimberley (born 1962), Dean of Christchurch from 2015 until 2023
- Lewis Kimberly (1830–1902), United States Naval officer during the American Civil War
- Maria Kimberly (born 1943 or 1944), former American top model and actress
- Oliver Kimberley, Anglican priest in the first half of the 20th century
- Patrícia Kimberly, born Gisele Barbosa in 1984), Brazilian prostitute, stripper, pornographic actress
- Percy Kimberley (1878–1949), Australian rules footballer
- Ron Kimberley (1914–1981), Australian rules footballer
- Talis Kimberley, British folk singer/songwriter, activist, and political figure
- Walter Kimberley (1884–1917), English footballer

== See also ==
- Kimberley (disambiguation)
