= Kimbell =

Kimbell is a surname. Notable people with the surname include:

== People ==
=== Surname ===
- Anne Kimbell (1932–2017), American actress
- Charles Kimbell, American politician
- Douglas Kimbell (born 1960), former USA National Team water polo player and Olympic medalist
- Gail Kimbell (born 1953), the 16th and first female Chief of the U.S. Forest Service
- George C. Kimbell or George C. Kimble (1803–1836), defender and officer of the Alamo Mission in San Antonio
- John Kimbell (born 1969), American golfer
- Kay Kimbell (1886–1964), entrepreneur and philanthropist, benefactor of the Kimbell Art Museum
- Ralph Kimbell (1884–1964), English cricketer

=== Name ===
- Kimbell Ward (born 1983), Saint Kitts and Nevis football referee

== Other ==
- Kimbell, New Zealand, a small locality in Canterbury, New Zealand
- Kimbell Art Museum in Fort Worth, Texas, United States
- The Kimbell-James Massacre at Fort Sinquefield, Alabama, United States

== See also ==
- Kimball (disambiguation)
- Kimble (disambiguation)
