= Kimberley (given name) =

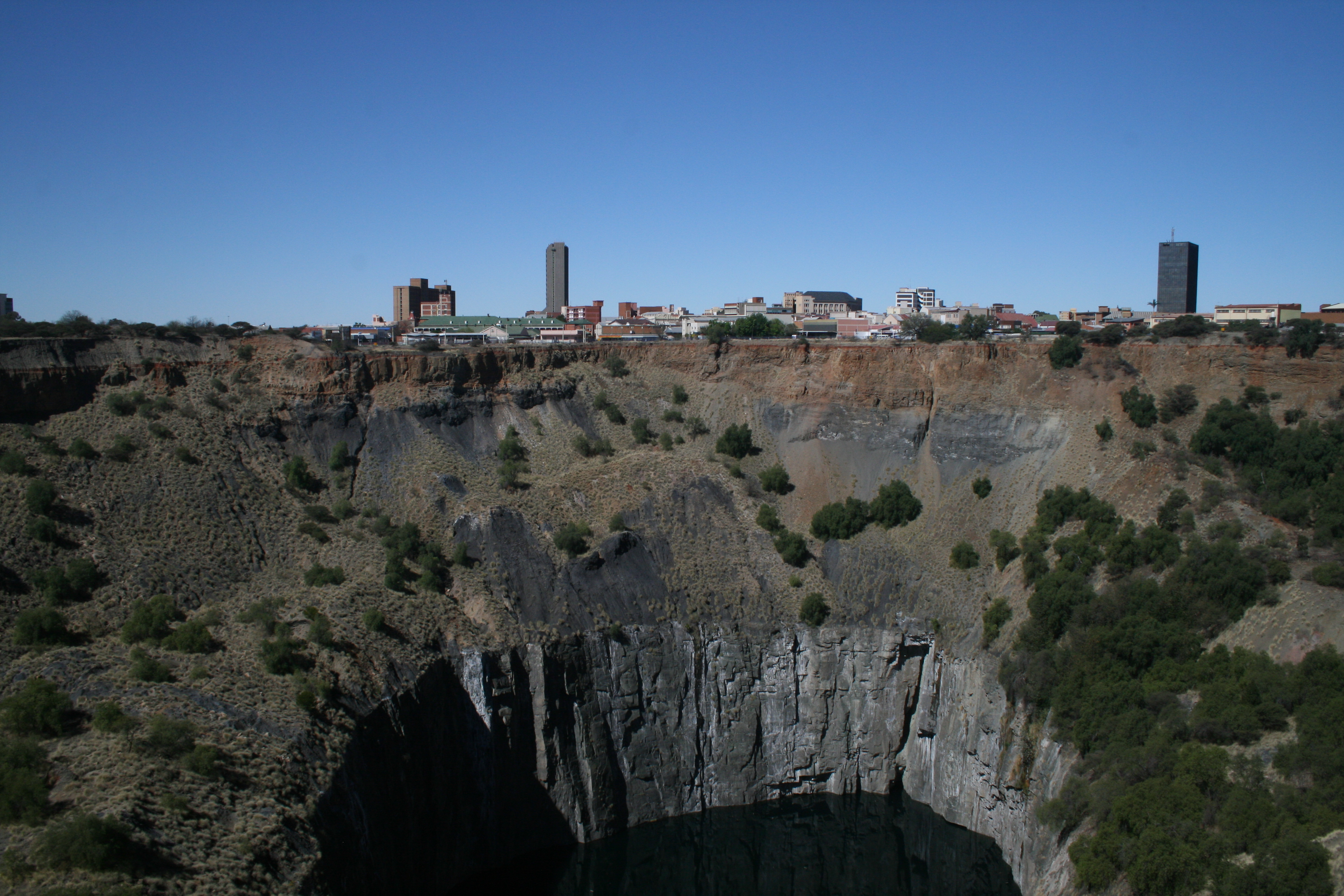
- Kimberley, Northern Cape, South Africa
- Pronunciation: /ˈkɪmbərli/ /kɪmˈbɛərli/
- Gender: Unisex
- Language: English

Other gender
- Feminine: Kimberleigh; Kimberlee; Kimberli

Origin
- Language: Old English
- Origin: Combination of Kimber and leigh
- Meaning: "From the meadow of the royal fortress".
- Region of origin: England

Other names
- Variant forms: Kimberlee, Kimberleigh, Kimberly (also an Australian form of Kimball), Kimberli, Kymberly, Kymberley
- Short forms: Kim, Kimmie, Kimmi, or Kimmy
- See also: Kimberley (surname)

Kimberley (also Kimberly or Kimberlee) is a unisex given name of Old English origin. John Wodehouse, 1st Earl of Kimberley, a place in Norfolk, England, popularised the name by giving it to a town in South Africa and a region in Australia. The first element, Kimber, reflects various Old English personal names; in the case of the Earldom in Norfolk this first appeared as Chineburlai in 1086 and seems to mean "clearing of a woman called Cyneburg (Cyneburga in Latin)". The second element is the Old English leah or leigh "meadow, clearing in a woodland".

== Origin of the given name ==
The given name Kimberley derives from Kimberley, in Northern Cape, South Africa, which was named after Lord Kimberley in the 19th century. At the end of the 19th century, this place was the scene of fighting and a British victory during the Second Boer War, and consequently the given name was popularised in the English-speaking world.

The name of Lord Kimberley's title derives from Kimberley, in Norfolk, England. This place name derives from two Old English elements: the first is the feminine personal name Cyneburg, which means "royal fortress"; the second is lēah, which means "woodland" or "clearing". The place name roughly means "woodland clearing of the royal fortress". It was recorded in the Domesday Book of 1086 as Chineburlai.

== Variants ==
Kimberley is a given name with many variants. Kimberley is used for males and females, while Kimberlee, Kimberleigh, and Kimberli are common feminine variant forms.

The common Korean surname Kim is not related to Kimberley.

== Notable women ==
- Kimberly Anyadike (born 1994), Nigerian-American aviator
- Kimberly Birrell (born 1998), Australian tennis player
- Kimberly Brooks (born 1968), American voice actress
- Kimberly Brooks (artist), American artist and author
- Kimberly Bryant (born 1967), American engineer and founder of Black Girls Code
- Kimberley Chen (born 1994), Australian-born, Taiwanese singer of Malaysian descent
- Kim Chiu (born 1990 as Kimberly Sue Yap Chiu), Filipino actress, host, model and singer
- Kimberley Cooper (born 1980), Australian actress
- Kimberley Davies (born 1973), Australian actress
- Kimberly Davis (born 1974), American professional wrestler known by her ring name Amber O'Neal
- Kim Deal (born 1961), American musician
- Kimberly Dos Ramos (born 1992), Venezuelan actress and model
- Kym Douglas (born 1959), American television personality, actress, and blogger
- Kitty Brucknell (born Kimberley Dayle Edwards, 1984), English singer-songwriter
- Kimberly Elise (born 1967), American actress
- Kimberly Andrews Espy, American academic administrator and neuropsychologist
- Kymberly Evanson (born 1977), American lawyer
- Kimberly Fisher, American politician
- Kimberly García (born 1993), Peruvian racewalker
- Kimberly Goss (born 1978), American singer of Korean descent
- Kym Mazelle (born Kymberly Grigsby; 1960), American singer
- Kim Guadagno (born 1959), New Jersey politician
- Kimberly Guilfoyle (born 1969), American news reporter
- Kimberly Hampton (1976–2004), United States Army officer
- Kimberly Hart-Simpson (born 1987), Welsh actress and businesswoman
- Kymberly Herrin (1957–2022), American model and actress
- Kimberly Hill (born 1989), American former professional volleyball player
- Kim Huffman or Kymberley Huffman, Canadian actress
- Kimberly Jones, American author
- Lil' Kim (born Kimberley Denise Jones, 1974), American rapper
- Kimberley Joseph, (born 1973), Canadian Australian actress
- Kimberly "Kim" Kardashian (born 1980), American entertainer
- Kimberly Keeton, American computer scientist
- Kimberly Kimble (born 1971), American celebrity hairstylist
- Kym Marsh (born 1976), English actress
- Kim Matula (born 1988), American actress
- Kimberly Poore Moser (born 1962), American politician from Kentucky
- Kimberly New, American politician from Georgia
- Kimberley Nixon (born 1986), Welsh actress
- Kimberly A. Novick, American environmental scientist
- Kymberly Paige (born 1966), American model and actress
- Kymberly N. Pinder, American art historian, curator, and university administrator
- Kymberly Pine (born 1970), State of Hawaii House of Representatives
- Kimberly Pomerleau, American politician
- Kimberly Powers, American epidemiologist
- Kimberly “Kim” Rhode (born 1979), American double trap and skeet shooter
- Kimberly Rogers (c. 1961–2001), Canadian criminal
- Kim Shattuck (1963–2019), American musician
- Kimberly Stevenson, American businesswoman
- Kim Taylor (born 1978), American politician from Virginia
- Kimberly Tuck (born 1974), Canadian curler
- Kimberley Walsh (born 1981), English singer in the girl band Girls Aloud
- Cimberly Wanyonyi (born 2005), Swedish singer
- Kimberly Weinberger, American actress
- Kimberly Williams-Paisley (born 1971), American actress
- Kimberley Anne Woltemas (born 1992), Thai actress and model
- Kimberly Wyatt (born 1982), member of The Pussycat Dolls
- Kimberley Zimmermann (born 1995), Belgian tennis player
- Kim Zolciak-Biermann (born 1978), American singer and reality star from The Real Housewives of Atlanta

== Notable men ==
- Kimberly Belton (born 1958), American basketball player
- Kimberly Benston (born 1953), American historian
- Kimberly B. Cheney (born 1935), American lawyer
- Kimberley Chance (1946–2017), Australian farmer and politician
- Kimberly Ezekwem (born 2001), German footballer
- Kimberley Goodburn (born 1999), Thai actor and model
- Kimberley Hughes (born 1954), Australian cricketer
- Kimberley Moyes (born 1976), Australian musician
- Kimberley Rew (born 1951), British guitarist and singer in Katrina and the Waves
- Kimberly G. Smith (1948–2018), American biologist
- Kimberley Williams (born 1952), Australian media executive
- Kimberley Wells (born 1958), Australian politician
- Kimberly John Young (born 1951), Canadian politician

== Fictional characters ==
- Kim Possible, a character in the television series of the same name
- Kimberly Andrews on the television series One Life to Live
- Kimberly "Kim" Bauer, a character in the television series 24
- Kimberly Brady, a character on the television series Days of Our Lives
- Kimberly "Kim" Burgess, a character in the television series Chicago P.D.
- Kimberly Corman, a character in the film Final Destination 2
- Kimberly Hart, a character in the Power Rangers franchise
- Kimberly "Kim" Hyde, a character in the television series Home and Away
- Kimberly "Kim" Pine, a character in the series of graphic stories Scott Pilgrim
- Kimberly Cougar "Kimmy" Schmidt, a character in the television series Unbreakable Kimmy Schmidt
- Kimberly Shaw in the television series Melrose Place
- Kimberly "Kim" Wexler, a character in the television series Better Call Saul

== See also ==
- Kim (given name)
- Kimmie
