= Kimball =

Kimball may refer to:

== People ==
- Kimball (surname)
- Kimball (given name)

== Places ==
=== Canada ===
- Kimball, Alberta

=== United States ===
- Kellogg, Iowa, formerly known as Kimball
- Kimball, Kansas
- Kimball, Minnesota
- Kimball, Nebraska, a city
- Kimball, South Dakota
- Kimball, Tennessee
- Kimball, West Virginia
- Kimball, Wisconsin, a town
  - Kimball (community), Wisconsin, an unincorporated community
- Kimball County, Nebraska
- Kimball Township, Michigan
- Kimball Township, Jackson County, Minnesota
- Mount Kimball, Alaska

== Schools ==
- Kimball High School (disambiguation), several
- Kimball School, an elementary school in Concord, New Hampshire

== Other uses ==
- Kimball O'Hara, title character of the novel Kim by Rudyard Kipling
- Kimbell Art Museum, Fort Worth, Texas
- Kimball dimensional modeling method in database design
- Kimball station, a station at the terminus of the Chicago Transit Authority's Brown Line
- Belmont station (CTA Blue Line), a station also known as Kimball
- Hotel Kimball, a historic former hotel in Springfield, Massachusetts, on the National Register of Historic Places
- Kimball International, former manufacturer of pianos and organs; currently a manufacturer of furniture and industrial electronics
- Kimball Medical Center, a hospital in Lakewood Township, New Jersey
- Kimball tag, a form of stock control label, often attached to items via a plastic toggle, using a "Kimball gun"
- USCGC Kimball, a United States Coast Guard cutter

== See also ==
- Kimble (disambiguation)
- Kim (disambiguation)
- Kimberley (disambiguation)
- Kimberly (disambiguation)
- Kimiko
