= Kimberley =

Kimberly or Kimberley may refer to:

== Places and historical events ==
=== Australia ===
==== Queensland ====
- Kimberley, Queensland, a coastal locality in the Shire of Douglas

==== South Australia ====
- County of Kimberley, a cadastral unit in South Australia

==== Tasmania ====
- Kimberley Warm Springs, Tasmania
- Kimberley, Tasmania a small town

==== Western Australia ====
- Kimberley (Western Australia)
- Kimberley Marine Park, a marine protected area
- Kimberley Range near Wiluna

=== Canada ===
- Kimberley, British Columbia, Canada

=== New Zealand ===
- Kimberley, New Zealand

=== South Africa ===
- Kimberley, Northern Cape, South Africa
  - Roman Catholic Diocese of Kimberley
  - Siege of Kimberley (1899–1900), event during the Second Boer War
  - Kimberley North (House of Assembly of South Africa constituency)
  - Kimberley South (House of Assembly of South Africa constituency)

=== United Kingdom ===
- Kimberley, Norfolk
  - Kimberley and Carleton Forehoe, a parish in Norfolk formerly called just "Kimberley"
- Kimberley, Nottinghamshire

=== United States ===
- Kimberly, Alabama, city
- Kimberly Mansion, a historic house in Connecticut
- Kimberly, Idaho, city
- Kimberly, Minnesota
- Kimberly Township, Aitkin County, Minnesota
- Kimberly, Missouri, unincorporated community
- Kimberly, Nevada, ghost town
- Kimberly, Oregon, unincorporated community
- Kimberly, Utah, abandoned town
- Kimberly, Fayette County, West Virginia, unincorporated community
- Kimberly, Monongalia County, West Virginia, unincorporated community
- Kimberly, Wisconsin, village

== People ==
- Kimberly (given name) (Kimberly and Kimberley)
- Kimberley (surname) (Kimberley and Kimberly)
- Earl of Kimberley, peerage in the United Kingdom

== Ships ==
- HMS Kimberley (F50), K-class destroyer of the Royal Navy
- SAS Kimberley (M1210), ex–HMS Stratton, Ton-class minesweeper, sold to South Africa in 1959 and renamed Kimberley
- USS Kimberly (DD-80), destroyer (1917–37) of the U.S. Navy
- USS Kimberly (DD-521), destroyer (1942–67) of the U.S. Navy

== Sports ==
- Kimberley de Mar del Plata or Club Atlético Kimberley, a sports club based in Mar del Plata, Argentina
- Kimberley Atlético Club, a sports club based in Villa Devoto, Buenos Aires, Argentina
- Kimberley Dynamiters (disambiguation), several Canadian ice hockey teams

== Other uses ==
- Kimberley Declaration, a 2002 statement regarding protection of traditional indigenous knowledge systems
- Kimberley Process Certification Scheme, to certify the origin of rough diamonds
- Kimberley (album), by Kimberley Chen, 2012
- "Kimberly", a song by Patti Smith from Horses, 1975
- Kimberly, a biscuit produced by Jacob Fruitfield Food Group

== See also ==
- Kimberly-Clark, U.S. producer of paper-based consumer products
- Duffner and Kimberly, U.S. lamp manufacturers
