= Bomanji =

Bomanji is a surname. Notable people with the surname include:

- Dhunjibhoy Bomanji (1862–1937), Indian shipping magnate
- Jamshed Bomanji, American professor
- Pestonji Bomanji (1851–1938), Indian painter
- Rustomji Bomanji Billimoria, Indian physician
- Avabai Bomanji Wadia (1913–2005), Ceylonese-born Indian social worker
