= Kimble =

Kimble may refer to:

== Places in the United States ==
- Russell Springs, Kentucky, known as "Kimble" from 1855 until 1901
- Kimble, Missouri, an unincorporated community
- Kimble County, Texas

== People and fictional characters ==
- Kimble (name), a list of people and fictional characters with the surname or given name
- Kim Dotcom (born 1974), German-Finnish Internet entrepreneur and political activist also known as "Kimble"

== Other uses ==
- Kimble (board game), Finnish version of the board game Trouble
- Kimble v. Marvel Entertainment, LLC, Supreme Court decision on patent misuse
- Kimble (app), a cloud-based PSA software application
- Kimble Chase, an American laboratory equipment manufacturer

== See also ==
- Great and Little Kimble cum Marsh, a civil parish in Buckinghamshire, England
- Kimball (disambiguation)
