= Fogelman =

Fogelman is a surname. Notable people with the surname include:

- Avron Fogelman (born 1940), American businessman
- Dan Fogelman (born 1976), American screenwriter and producer
- Eva Fogelman, American psychologist
- Ignac Fogelman (1940–2016), British researcher
- John Fogelman (born 1965), American entrepreneur
- Marj Fogelman (born 1972), American politician
- Peggy Fogelman, American museum director

== See also ==
- Fogleman
- Vogelmann
- Vogelman
