= Althea Murphy-Price =

American artist

Althea Murphy-Price is an American artist who specializes in printmaking, and Professor of Art at University of Tennessee at Knoxville. Her work "contemplates the power of hair as a signifier of cultural self-identity."

== Early life ==
Murphy-Price was born in California.

== Education ==
Murphy-Price earned her B.A. in Studio Fine Arts from Spelman College in 2001. In 2003, she earned an M.A. in Painting and Printmaking from Purdue University. Murphy-Price earned an MFA in Printmaking from the Tyler School of Art at Temple University in 2005.

== Career ==
Murphy-Price has served as assistant professor in printmaking at the Hope School of Fine Arts at Indiana University and at the University of Tennessee, Knoxville.

== Technique ==
Murphy-Price's signature technique is the creating prints by using synthetic hair extensions as the lines in her work. Her technique is profiled in Beth Grabowski and Bill Fick's Printmaking: A Complete Guide to Materials and Process.

Murphy-Price uses both hair and hair accessories to create sculpture and installations, as well. Hair Rug No. 2 involved the artist dusting synthetic hair on the floor over lace overlay to create a striking rug-like pattern.

== Exhibitions and collections ==
Murphy-Price has participated in solo and small-group exhibitions including:

- "Supplemental Ornament," Weston Art Gallery, Cincinnati, 2008–2009.
- "Salon Time: Sonya Clark + Althea Murphy-Price + Nontsikelelo Mutiti," at Union for Contemporary Art in Omaha
- Minthorne Gallery at George Fox University
- "Unreal Expectation," at E. Bronson Ingram Studio Arts Center, Vanderbilt University
- "Hair on Fire" at Halsey Institute of Contemporary Art at The College of Charleston
- "Superficial Details: Althea Murphy Price" at the Turchin Center for the Visual Arts at Appalachian State University

She has been an artist-in-residence at the Frank Lloyd Wright School, University of Hawaiʻi at Hilo, and The Vermont Studio Center.

Murphy-Price's works can be found in the collections of University of Akron, Gallery Collections in Akron, Ohio; Kohler Library, University of Wisconsin in Madison, Wisconsin; Tyler School of Art Archives in Philadelphia, PA; Woodruff Library, Atlanta University Center in Atlanta, GA, among others.
