= Kimmie =

Kimmie, Kimmy, Kimmey or Kimmi is a given name, usually feminine and often a short form (hypocorism) of Kimberly or Kimberley. It may refer to:

== Women ==
- Kimmey Raschke (born 1974), Puerto Rican politician
- Kimmi Kappenberg, a contestant on the reality TV shows Survivor: The Australian Outback and Survivor: Cambodia
- Kimmi Lewis (1957–2019), American politician
- Kimberly "Kimmie" Meissner (born 1989), American retired figure skater
- Kimmy Repond (born 2006), Swiss figure skater
- Kimmie Rhodes (born 1954), American singer-songwriter
- Kimmy Robertson (born 1954), American actress
- Kimberley "Kimmie" Taylor (born 1989), English woman who joined a Kurdish militia in Syria
- Kimmy Tong (born 1990), Chinese actress

== Men ==
- Kimmie Weeks (born 1981), Liberian human rights activist

== Fictional characters ==
- Kimmy Gibbler in the American television series Full House
- Kimmy GoDongHae, in the Filipino film series Kimmy Dora
- Kimberly "Kimmy" Schmidt, the title character of the Netflix series Unbreakable Kimmy Schmidt
- Kimmy, a playable character in the mobile game Mobile Legends: Bang Bang
