= British Nuclear Medicine Society =

Independent British medical organisation

The British Nuclear Medicine Society (BNMS) was established in 1966 and is an independent forum devoted to various aspects of nuclear medicine in the UK. The mission statement of BNMS is "the advancement of science and public education in Nuclear Medicine that would benefit patients." As of 2020 the BNMS has over 600 members. The BNMS is a registered company and charity.

== History ==
Founders Edward Williams, David Keeling, Steve Garnett, and Ralph McCready formed the society during a meeting held July 1966 at the Prince Alfred pub in Queensway, London. The BNMS began its life as a Nuclear Medicine Society, which was meant to enhance the future prospects of physicians in nuclear medicine. The first president of the society during 1968-69 was Clive J Hayter from Leeds. The organization held annual conferences since 1972. The BNMS hosted the second joint meeting under the presidency of Keith Britton in London in 1985, attended by 3000 participants.

In 2016, BNMS celebrated its fiftieth anniversary and published a 170-page "History of Radionuclide Studies in the UK".

== Structure ==
BMNS is headquartered on the Jubilee Campus of the University of Nottingham.

== Activities ==
BNMS publishes a monthly journal, Nuclear Medicine Communications. Key events of the society include the biannual conference as well as participation in smaller, subject-specific, meetings and workshops.

BNMS publishes a range of guidance documents for nuclear medicine departments including on; patient information leaflets, the tendering of equipment, diagnostic imaging and non-imaging procedures, therapeutic procedures, and training requirements. Its clinical guidance is indexed in the National Institute for Health and Care Excellence evidence search.

The society and its UK Radiopharmacy Group provide resources for radiopharmacies in the UK, as well as work relating to supply issues for medical radionuclides, which largely come from outside the UK. This included several publications related to the impact of a no-deal Brexit.

== Awards and fellowships ==
The Society sometimes gives awards to individuals and teams in the area of nuclear medicine in UK for using innovation and creativity to improve their service to public.

- The Society's Norman Veall Medal is offered to those members who contributed to BNMS and the history of nuclear medicine in the UK. This award has been given every year since 1994.
- The Society's Presidential Medal prize is offered to Clinicians each year who have made an exceptional contribution to nuclear medicine. This award is given on a yearly basis since 2009.
- The Society's Radiographers, Technologists & Nurses Award, as the name suggests, is given to nurses, technologists, or radiographers for making an outstanding contribution to their profession in any aspects of nuclear medicine practice. The award has been given on a yearly basis since 2008.
- The Society's Roll of Honour award is offered by the officers to its selected members on the basis of nominations for playing a significant role in the area of their speciality. The prize may also be given posthumously. The award is given on a yearly basis since 2017. The award was first offered during 1983 at the Annual General Meeting.

== See also ==
- British Institute of Radiology
