= Kimberly Stevenson =

American business executive

Kimberly "Kim" Stevenson
- Education: Cornell University (MBA) Northeastern (BA)
- Years active: 1983 - present
- Board member of: Mitek Systems, Inc Skyworks Solutions, Inc TruU Advisory Board

Kim Stevenson is an American business executive focused on managing technology businesses and driving IT digital transformation for technology brands including NetApp, Lenovo, Intel, IBM, EDS, and HPE. She currently serves on the board of directors for Ambiq Micro, Mitek Systems, Quarterhill Inc., and Verisk Analytics, Inc. as well as on the advisory board of TruU, a privately held software company.

== Early life and education ==
Stevenson earned a bachelor's degree from Northeastern University and holds a master's degree in business administration from Cornell University.

In her free time, Stevenson plays tennis player, kayaks and paddle boardings.

She does volunteer work for the National Park Service and National Canoe Safety Patrol volunteer org at the Delaware River National recreation area.

== Career ==
In August 2021 Stevenson left NetApp to focus on full time board service. Most recently Kim served as Senior Vice President & General Manager of NetApp's Foundational Data Services Business Unit, NetApp's largest business unit.

Prior to NetApp, she was a Senior Vice President and General Manager for Data Center Infrastructure at Lenovo. Before joining Lenovo, Stevenson spent five years at Intel, as chief operating officer (COO) for the Client, Internet of Things and System Architecture (CISA) Group. Prior to that, she was Intel's chief information officer (CIO).

Before Intel, she held a variety of positions at EDS, including vice president of its worldwide communications, media and entertainment (CM&E) industry practice, as well as vice president of enterprise service management, where she oversaw the global development and delivery of enterprise services.

Before EDS, Stevenson spent 18 years at IBM in several executive positions including Vice President of Marketing and Operations of the eServer iSeries division.

=== Board Service ===
Stevenson is currently serving on the boards of Ambiq Micro, Mitek Systems, Quarterhill Inc., and Verisk Analytics, Inc. as well as on the advisory board of TruU, a privately held software company.

She also has served on the board of directors of Cloudera, Riverbed Technology, Boston Private Financial Holdings, Inc., Skyworks Solutions, Inc. and the National Center for Women & IT.

Stevenson is often quoted in the press on the new reality of technology driving business. "Every business is a technology business," according to Stevenson, "and more companies are adding CIOs to their boardrooms."

"The three things Boards and CEOs expect from their CIO, which are (1) to reimagine and define the customer experience, (2) extreme productivity, and (3) that they invent and deliver new products and services to allow them to grow."

=== Recognition ===
Stevenson awards include the HMG Strategy 2021 Global Leadership Institute's “Leading into the C-Suite” award, Technology Magazine's #19 of the Top 100 Women in Technology 2021 and Constellation's 2020 Business Transformation BT150 award. As well as recognition for her CIO leadership contributions including Silicon Valley Business Journal's Best CIO, Evanta Top 10 Breakaway Leader, Huffington Post's Most Social CIO and the CIO 100 award by CIO.com. She was named the Woman of Excellence Digital Trailblazer by the National Association of Female Executives (NAFE).

List of Kim Stevenson Industry Awards and Recognition
Award	Year	Awarding Entity
Leading into the C-Suite award	2021	HMG Strategy
Constellation's 2020 Business Transformation BT150 award	2020	Constellation
CIO 100 award	2016	CIO.com
Huffington Post's Most Social CIO	2016	Huffington Post
CIO 100 award	2015	CIO.com
Woman of Excellence Digital Trailblazer	2015	National Association of Female Executives (NAFE)
Diverse Corporate Leader & 100 CIO/CTO Leader	2015	STEMconnector
Huffington Post's Most Social CIO	2014	Huffington Post
CIO 100 award	2014	CIO.com
Evanta Top 10 Breakaway Leader	2014	Evanta, a Gartner company
Silicon Valley Business Journal's Best CIO	2014	Silicon Valley Business Journal
CIO 100 award	2013	CIO.com
