= Ignac Fogelman =

Nuclear medicine researcher (1948-2016)

Ignac Fogelman (1948–5 July 2016) was a professor of Nuclear Medicine at King’s College London, Honorary Consultant Physician at Guy’s and St Thomas’ NHS Trust, and Director of the Osteoporosis Screening & Research Unit at Guy’s Hospital. He was born in 1948 in Germany and died on 5 July 2016 in the United Kingdom. He is known as the father of bone imaging by some researchers and academics.

== Career ==
Fogelman obtained an MD degree at the Medicine Department of the Glasgow Royal Infirmary in Scotland, where he worked with Dr Iain Boyle and Dr Rodney Bessent. His research interests included, but were not limited to, evaluation and development of techniques for the assessment of bone mineral density, mainly using dual-photon absorptiometry (DPA) and dual-energy x-ray absorptiometry (DXA) scanners.

He was appointed as a Consultant Physician in the Nuclear Medicine Department at Guy’s Hospital in 1983. He set-up the first osteoporosis-related bone screening service in the UK. He started working at King's College London (KCL) during mid-1992 until he died. He became a full professor in 1996. He retired from NHS in 2015.

Ignac was also a former board member and trustee of National Osteoporosis Society. He also chaired the board of examiners for masters course in Nuclear Medicine at KCL.

== Books and publications ==
He started publishing research his work during 1977, and published more than 500 scientific documents during his career with over 18,700 citations. According to Scopus, he has an h-index of 67 as for mid-2020. He contributed to 15 books throughout his career. His most successful book is the "Atlas of Clinical Nuclear Medicine", which is most widely used in the world of nuclear medicine.

== Selected books ==
- 1996: Skeletal nuclear medicine, edited by David Collier, Ignac Fogelman, Leonard Rosenthall.
- 1998: Evaluation Of Osteoporosis, edited by Glen M Blake, Heinz W Wahner, Ignac Fogelman.
- 2000: An Atlas of Planar and SPECT Bone Scans, edited by David D Collier, Ignac Fogelman, Lawrence E Holder
- 2012: Bone Scanning in Clinical Practice, edited by Ignac Fogelman.
- 2013: Radionuclide and Hybrid Bone Imaging, edited by Ignac Fogelman, Gopinath Gnanasegaran, Hans van der Wal.
- 2014: Atlas of Clinical Nuclear Medicine, Third Edition edited by Ignac Fogelman, Susan Clarke, Gary Cook, Gopinath Gnanasegaran.

== Awards ==
- 2005: Vikram Sarabhai Oration Award by the Society of Nuclear Medicine of India.
- 2014: Sir Godfrey Hounsfield Memorial Award by the British Institute of Radiology (BIR).
- 2015: Invited to present the Dent Lecture by the Bone Research Society (BRS).
- 2017: The Roll of Honour award by the British Nuclear Medicine Society (BNMS).

== Personal life ==
Ignac married Coral in 1974 and had two children, and grandchildren. He had a keen personal interest in food, wine, theatre, opera, art exhibitions, perfumes, reading novels, and he spoke many languages.
