= Steve Garnett =

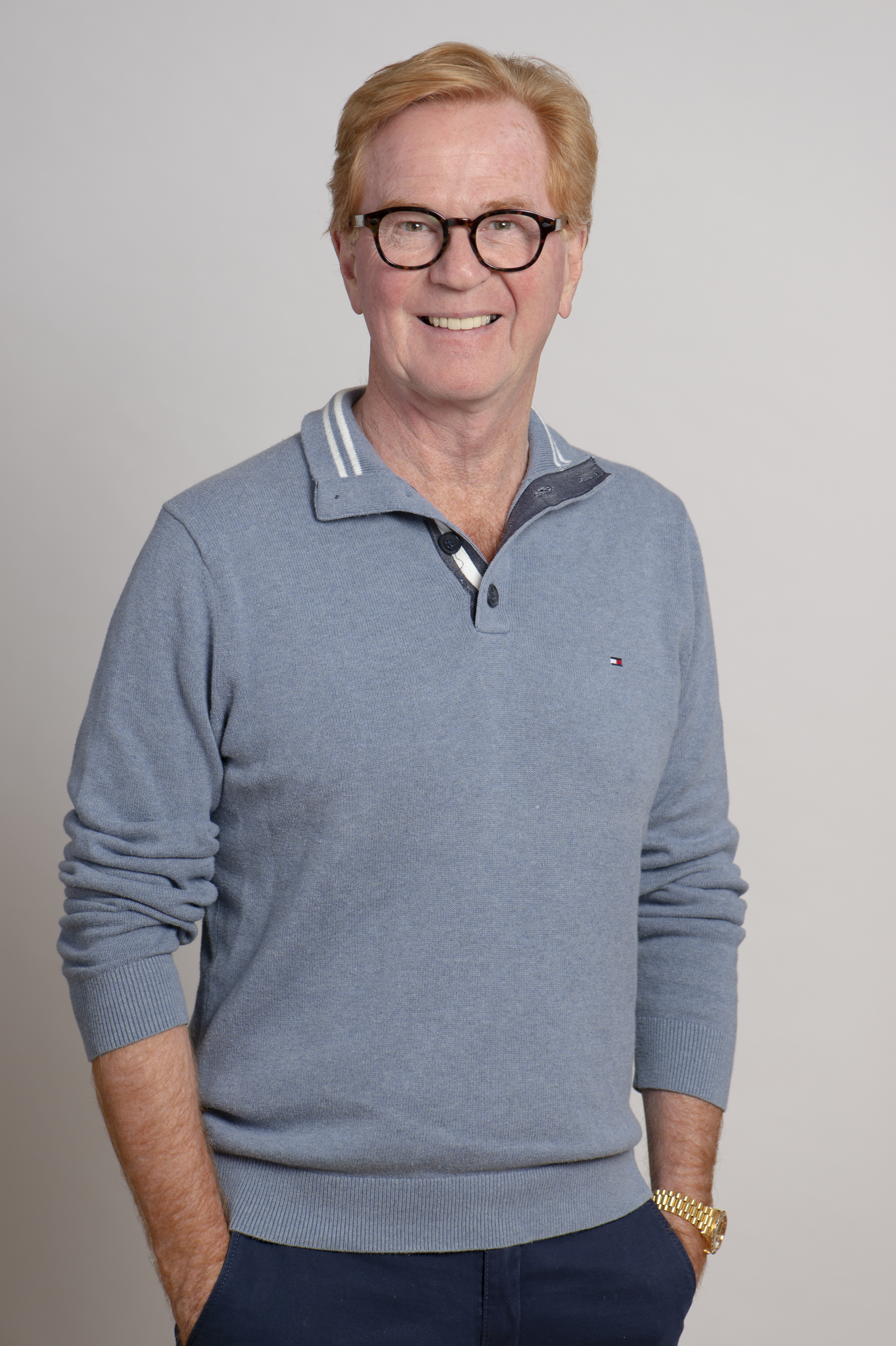
- Born: 7 December 1957 (age 68); Liverpool, United Kingdom
- Occupations: Businessman, investor
- Known for: Executive roles at Oracle, Siebel Systems, Salesforce
- Awards: Honorary Fellowship, Liverpool John Moores University, University of Liverpool and University of Cardiff

Steve Garnett (born 7 December 1957) is a British software executive and investor. He held senior leadership positions at Oracle Corporation, Siebel Systems, and Salesforce, and has since been active as a board member and investor in technology companies. In 2009, The Daily Telegraph listed him among the "50 most influential Britons in technology" for his role in cloud computing.

== Biography ==
=== Early life and education ===
Garnett was born in Fazakerley, Liverpool, the youngest of four children in a working-class family, and grew up in the Fazakerley area. His father, a docker, died when Garnett was eight years old, leaving his mother to raise him and his three sisters while working as a cleaner at the local school. His three sisters left school at the age of sixteen to work.

Garnett attended Breckfield Comprehensive (formerly John Hamilton High School) in Everton Valley. He pursued A-levels in mathematics, further mathematics, and physics, and gained a government grant to study mathematics at Cardiff University, where he received a BSc degree in 1980. He went on to obtain a doctorate (PhD) in theoretical physics from the University of Manchester, with research focused on thermodynamics and nuclear engineering.

== Career ==
=== Logica ===
After completing his PhD, Steve Garnett began working in the technology sector in the early 1980s. In 1984, he joined the British software company Logica as a programmer, where he worked on a project for the Atomic Weapons Research Establishment (AWRE) in Aldermaston, developing a stores system on the VAX-11/780 using Digital Command Language (DCL).

=== Oracle ===
Garnett joined Oracle Corporation in 1986 in technical support, before its initial public offering, becoming one of the company’s early UK employees. He soon moved into senior roles in sales, marketing, and alliances. Over the following 12 years at Oracle, he held various positions including Director of UK Sales and Vice President of European Marketing & Alliances. During his tenure, Oracle became the world’s second-largest software company.

=== Siebel systems ===
In 1997, Garnett joined Siebel Systems, founded by former Oracle employees Tom Siebel and Craig Ramsey, as Vice President and General Manager for Europe, the Middle East, and Africa. He was also a member of the Siebel Systems founder’s circle and led its expansion across the region. Siebel grew to become one of the world’s largest enterprise software firms by the early 2000s, with around 8,000 employees and a peak valuation of approximately $60 billion. Garnett left the company in 2003, and Oracle acquired Siebel Systems in 2006.

=== Salesforce ===
Garnett joined Salesforce in 2003 at the invitation of co-founder and former Oracle executive Marc Benioff to lead European operations. He served as Senior Vice President, General Manager for EMEA, and later as Executive Chairman, EMEA. He oversaw Salesforce’s expansion in the region and contributed to its expansion from start-up to a global enterprise. He was also a regular guest and contributor to CNBC, The Wall Street Journal, Forbes, and other media, advocating the software-as-a-service (SaaS) model and cloud computing, and analysing the impact of new, transformational technologies, such as AI.

In 2016 he retired. Today, the company employs over 70,000 people with a market capitalization of over $250 billion.

== Board memberships ==
After retiring from Salesforce, Garnett became a serial investor and board member in technology companies. He was a founding investor and chairman of Fairsail, later acquired by Sage Group and rebranded as Sage People. Garnett was also the seed investor and largest external backer of Kimble Applications, acquired by Accel-KKR in 2021 for an estimated $150 million. He has also served as chairman of Intellisense.io, and Artesian Solutions, and as a non-executive director of CensorNet and 1E.

== Public activities ==
Since retiring from executive roles, Steve Garnett has focused on philanthropic efforts supporting education. In 2018, Liverpool John Moores University awarded him an Honorary Fellowship. In 2019, Cardiff University also named him an Honorary Fellow. In 2024, he was awarded an Honorary Doctorate from Liverpool University. He is a supporter of the University of Liverpool’s specialist Maths School, which he officially opened in 2021.

Garnett was involved with The Royal Foundation in its early years, contributed to the establishment of Teach First under the chairmanship of Dame Julia Cleverdon, and collaborates with her on the Transform Society initiative, which applies similar principles to social services, prisons, and policing.
