= Yale School of Art =

Art school in New Haven, Connecticut

- Coat of arms of the school
- Type: Private
- Established: 1869
- Dean: Kymberly Pinder
- Faculty: 100
- Students: 126 (MFA)
- Location: New Haven, Connecticut, US; 41.30861°N 72.93190°W
- Website: art.yale.edu

The Yale School of Art is the visual art school of Yale University, a private Ivy League research university located in New Haven, Connecticut. Founded in 1869 as the first professional fine arts school in the United States, it grants Masters of Fine Arts degrees to students completing a two-year course in graphic design, painting/printmaking, photography, or sculpture.

== History ==
=== The Trumbull Gallery (1832–1864) ===
The study of the visual arts at Yale began with the opening of the Trumbull Gallery in 1832. The Gallery was founded by portrait artist Colonel John Trumbull with the help of Professor Benjamin Silliman, a prominent chemist.

=== School of Fine Arts (1864–1950) ===
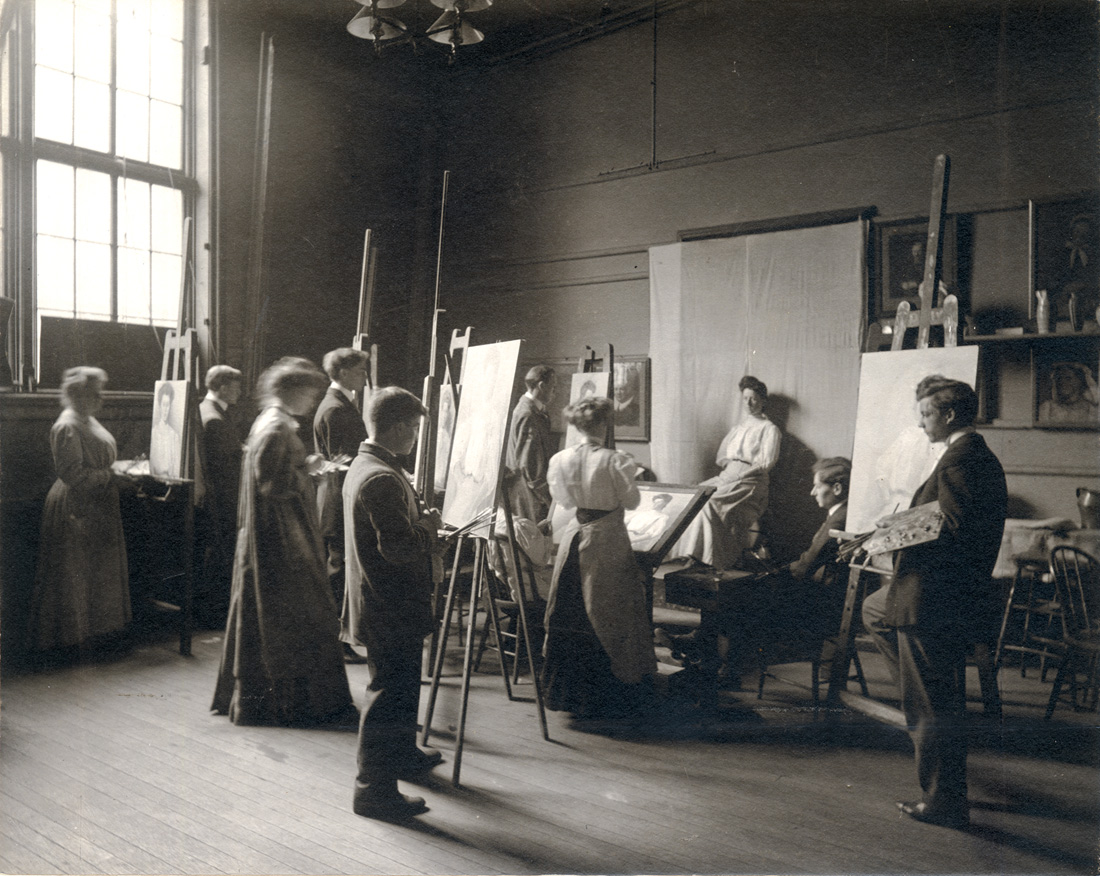
Studio painting class, with both male and female students and a woman figure as a subject of study, circa 1905

In 1864, Augustus Russell Street donated funds for the establishment of a School of Fine Arts at Yale. In his bequest, Street stipulated that it be "a school for practical instruction, open to both sexes, for such as propose to follow art as a profession." The program was placed under an art council, one of whose members was the painter-inventor Samuel F. B. Morse, a graduate of Yale College. Yale alumnus Andrew Dickson White was petitioned by the school's faculty to become the first dean, but instead opted to be the first president of Cornell University. A new building for the school, Street Hall, was completed in 1866.

John Ferguson Weir, an artist, was the first director, and later a dean, of the Yale School of Fine Arts. He played a leading role in determining the initial curriculum at the school. While he did not attend a college or university, he studied under his father, Robert W. Weir, professor of art at the US Military Academy in West Point. As Weir began work on curriculum development at Yale he sought some guidance from his younger brother, Julian Alden Weir, who was studying art in Paris.

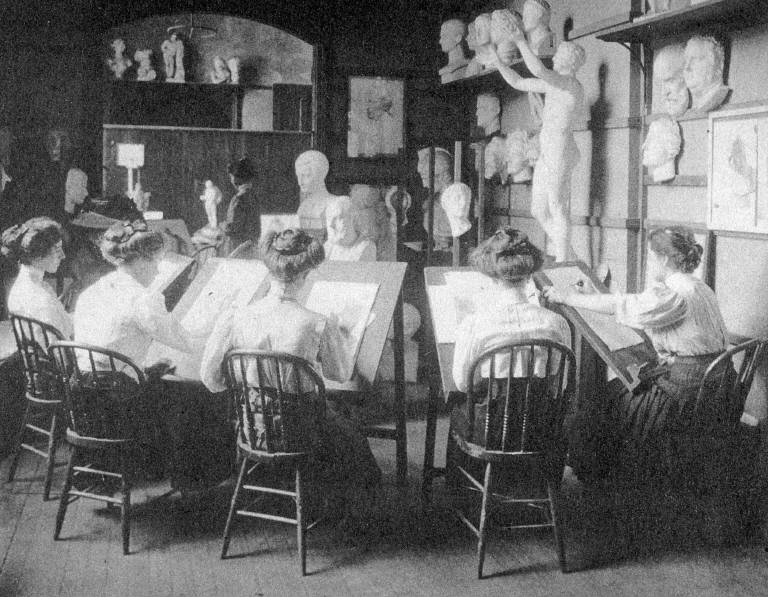
Students taking a drawing course in Street Hall circa 1905

When the School of Fine Arts opened to students in 1869, it was the first of its kind affiliated with a tertiary institution in America. A three-year course in drawing, painting, sculpture, and art history was inaugurated. Two women—Alice and Susan Silliman, daughters of Benjamin Silliman Jr.—enrolled in the first cohort of three students, and the School of Fine Arts became the first of Yale's schools to allow co-educational instruction. For the next four decades, more than three-quarters of its students were women. Early on, the three-year program yielded a certificate of completion. A degree program was created in 1891 with the authorization of a Bachelor of Fine Arts degree by the university's governing body.

Several other arts disciplines were added to the School of Fine Arts and later became independent schools. Architectural instruction was begun in 1908 and was established as a department in 1916 with Everett Victor Meeks at its head. The architecture program quickly became dominant, especially under painter Eugene Savage's efforts to reframe painting and sculpture as "architectural arts" in the 1920s. Drama, under the direction of George Pierce Baker and with its own separate building, was added in 1925 and continued to function as a department of the School until it became an independent school in 1955.

=== Department of Design (1950–1958) ===
Josef Albers came to the Yale School of Art in 1950. As department chair, "he reimagined the [Yale] curriculum by integrating painting, sculpture, graphic arts, and architecture under the common purpose of design."

Albers taught that the "unique qualities of perceptual understanding in visual education are that they are applicable to all areas of art—architecture, fine arts, design, photography, and all of the crafts. Perceptual understanding always is relevant, since it transcends all styles and time frames—it is never in or out of date." Blurring the distinction between the fine arts and applied arts, Albers "transformed the teaching of art and design in the 20th century by asserting that the point of making of art is not the finished product, but the process—that art is not an object, art is an experience."

The department of graphic design (initially called graphic arts) was begun in 1951 under the direction of Alvin Eisenman. It was the first graduate program in graphic design in the United States.

=== School of Art and Architecture (1959–1972) ===
In 1959 the School of Art and Architecture was made a fully graduate professional school. Four years later, the Art and Architecture Building, designed by Paul Rudolph, was opened. The building's brutalist style was controversial, admired by some and poorly received by others. It was described by architecture magazines as "the building of the decade."

=== School of Art (1972–present) ===
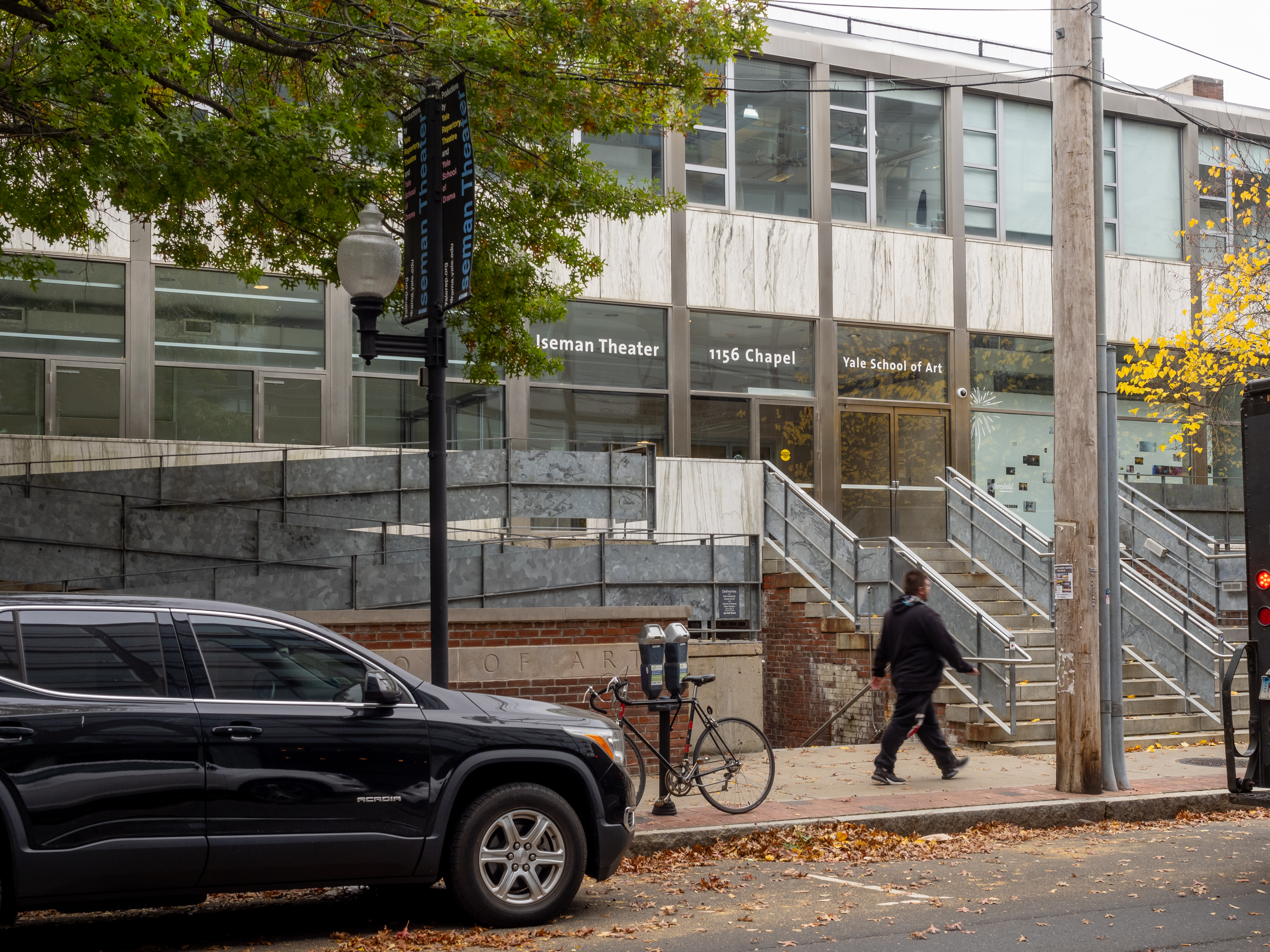
Green Hall, the school's main building since 1994

In 1972, the School of Art and the School of Architecture were split. They continued to share the Art and Architecture building until 2000. In 2000, the art school moved into a newly renovated building around the corner from Rudolph Building called Holcombe T. Green Jr., Hall. Designed partially by Louis Kahn, the building had been built as the New Haven Jewish Community Center; its renovations were designed by architect Deborah Berke. Green Hall houses BFA and MFA students in photography and graphic design. The painting MFAs have their own building behind Green Hall; sculpture MFAs, who used to be in Hammond Hall across campus (since demolished), are now in a new sculpture building at 36 Edgewood, designed by Kiernan Timberlake and Associates.

In 2021, the School of Art announced that they would be hiring Dr. Kymberly Pinder as their new dean. She came to the School of Art after serving as acting president of MassArt in Boston. Pinder is the first woman of color (and only second woman) to hold the position of dean.

== Study ==
The degree of Master of Fine Arts is the only degree offered by the School of Art. It is conferred upon recommendation of the faculty after successful completion of all course work in residence and after a faculty-approved thesis presentation. The minimum residence requirement is two years. All candidates’ work is reviewed by faculty at the end of each term.

The School of Art offers professional instruction in four interrelated areas of study: graphic design, painting/printmaking, photography, and sculpture. The graduate student's primary educational experience is centered on studio activity. Supporting this are structured courses such as drawing, filmmaking, and the relativity of color.

The Yale Daily News reported in February 2007 that 1,215 applicants for its class of 2009 sought admission to 55 places. The Yale Alumni Magazine reported in November 2008 that the School admitted sixty-five applicants from among 1,142 for its class of 2010, and that fifty-six enrolled (5.7% acceptance rate).

Yale College, the undergraduate division of Yale University, offers a Bachelor of Arts degree program with a major in art. Undergraduate applicants wishing to major in art at Yale must apply to Yale College directly. The undergraduate program in art offers courses that, through work in a variety of media, provide an experience in the visual arts as part of a liberal education as well as preparation for graduate study and professional work.

== Rankings ==
As of 2026, U.S. News & World Report's most recent rankings place the Yale School of Art as first on their list of Best Masters of Fine Arts programs. U.S. News & World Report's rankings are based on surveys of academics at art and design programs.

In their previous rankings done in 2020, U.S. News & World Report ranked Yale as second in fine arts, tied with the School of the Art Institute of Chicago and behind the UCLA School of the Arts and Architecture. By specialty, the school was then ranked first in painting/drawing and photography, and second for sculpture (behind Virginia Commonwealth University School of the Arts) and graphic design (behind Rhode Island School of Design). Previously, U.S. News & World Report ranked Yale's MFA program as first in 2016, first in 2012, second (behind Rhode Island School of Design) in 2008, first in 2003 (tied with Rhode Island School of Design and School of the Art Institute of Chicago), and second in 1997 (behind School of the Art Institute of Chicago and tied with Rhode Island School of Design).

In 2017, the art website Artsy also ranked the school first, stating that it has "topped nearly every annual survey of the best MFA programs in the nation."

== Notable alumni ==
Many notable artists have graduated from Yale. These include graphic designers Ivan Chermayeff, Jane Davis Doggett, Alan Fletcher, Tom Geismar, Norman Ives, and Nontsikelelo Mutiti.

Notable painters graduating from Yale include William Bailey, Jennifer Bartlett, Chuck Close, Joan Wadleigh Curran, John Currin, Lisa Yuskavage, Isabella Doerfler, Rackstraw Downes, Janet Fish, Audrey Flack, Hilary Harkness, Robert Mangold, Brice Marden, Sean Landers, Tameka Norris, Howardena Pindell, Mickalene Thomas, Robert Vickrey, and Kehinde Wiley.

Notable alumni photographers include David Levinthal, Gail Albert Halaban, Dawoud Bey, Gregory Crewdson, Philip-Lorca diCorcia, Pao Houa Her, Constance Thalken, and Susan Lipper.

Notable alumni sculptors include Jack Burnham, Ann Hamilton, Eva Hesse, Nancy Graves, James Angus, Wangechi Mutu, Charlotte Park Martin Puryear, Jean Blackburn, Reeva Potoff, Frederic Remington, Priscilla Roberts, Fred Sandback, Sula Bermúdez-Silverman and Richard Serra.

Other notable artists graduating from Yale include the printmaker Imna Arroyo, cartoonist Garry Trudeau, and multimedia artists Matthew Barney and Alex Da Corte.

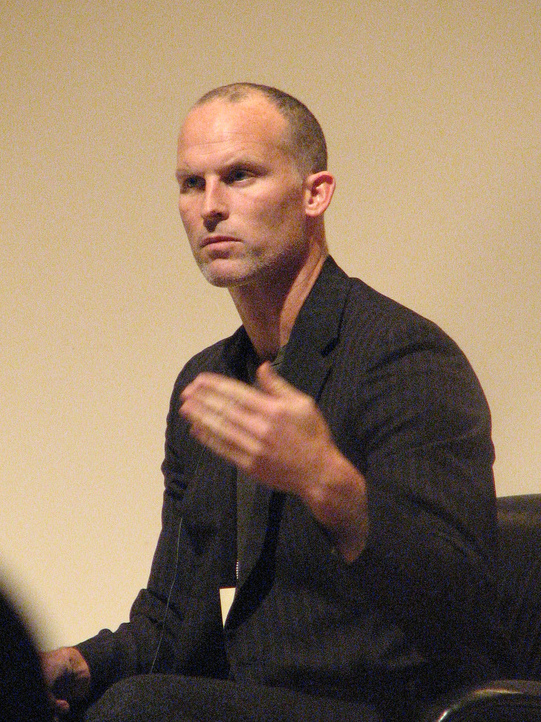
Sculptor and film director Matthew Barney (BA 1989)

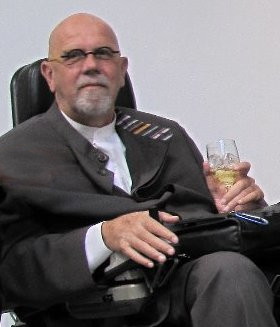
Painter Chuck Close (BFA 1963, MFA 1964)

Sculptor and installation artist Ann Hamilton (MFA 1985)

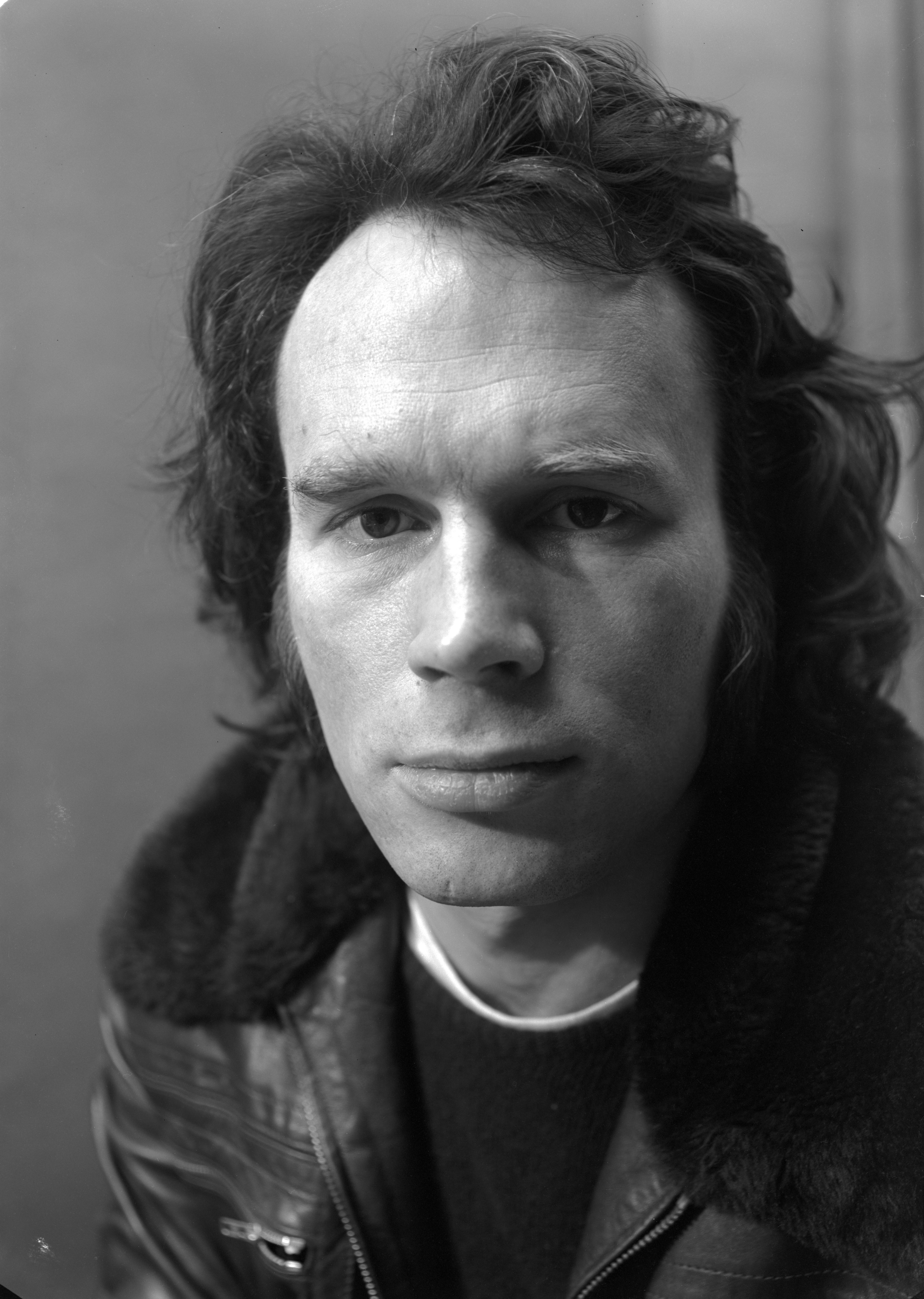
Painter Brice Marden (MFA 1963)

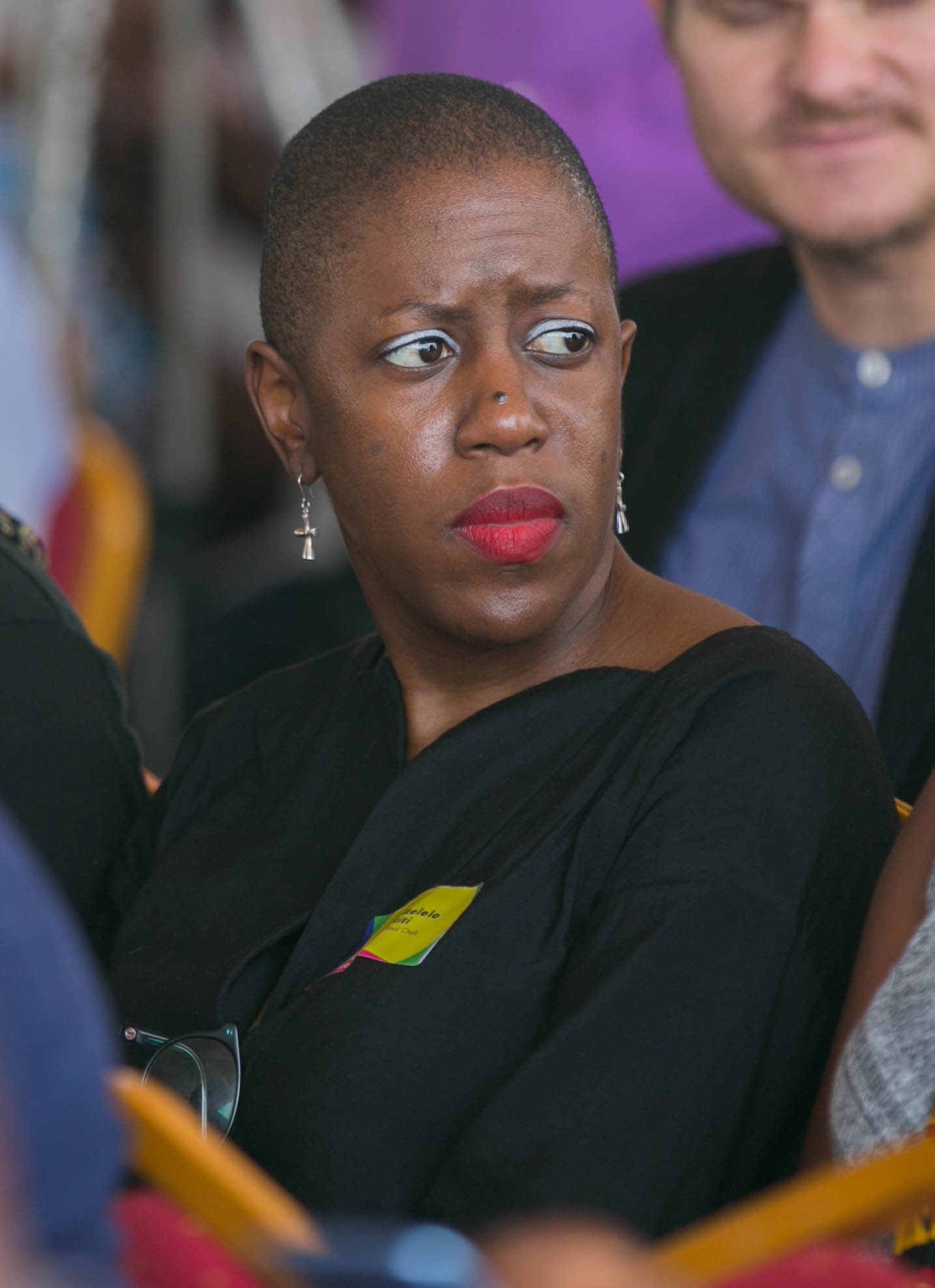
Graphic Designer Nontsikelelo Mutiti (MFA 2012)

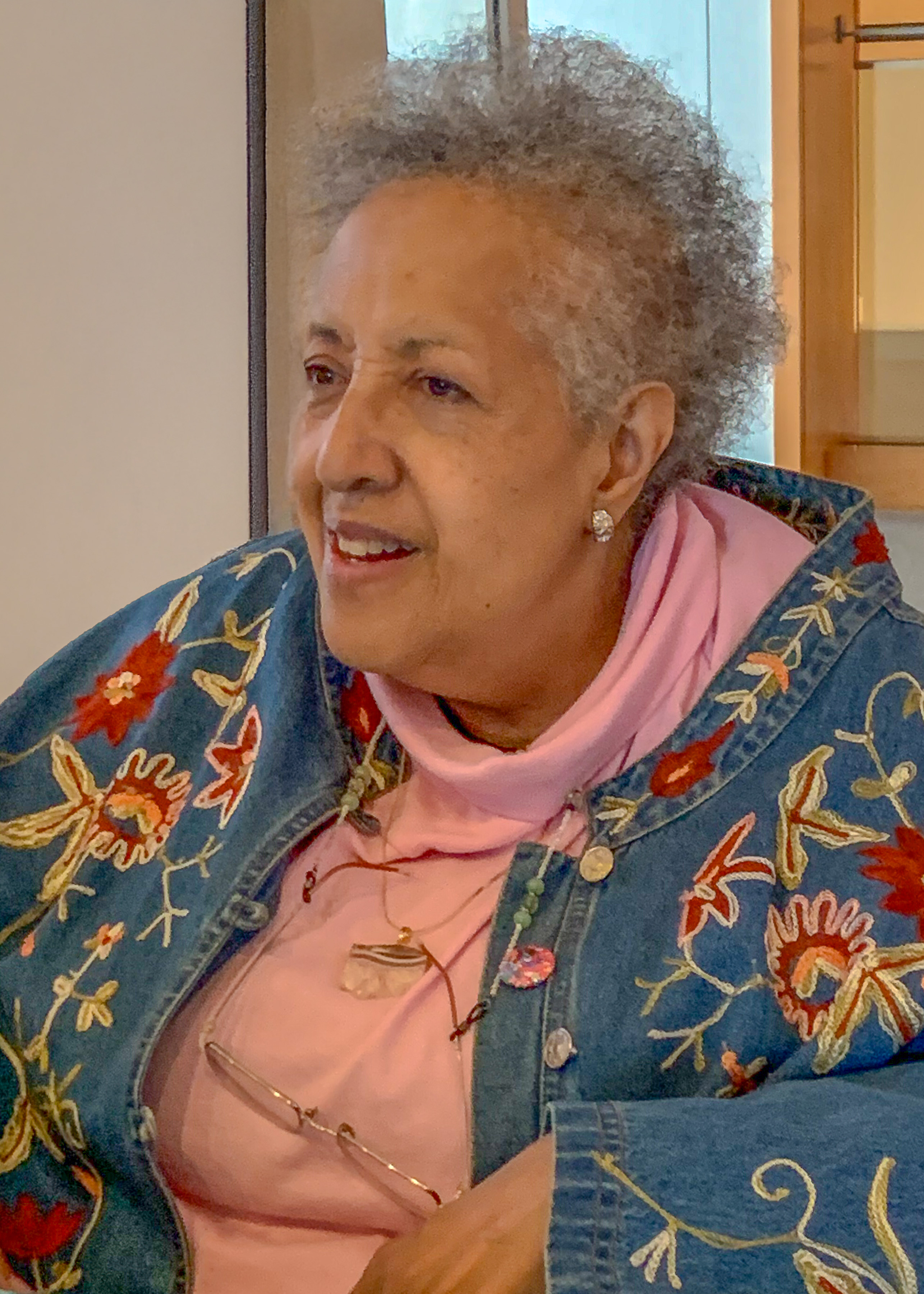
Painter Howardena Pindell (MFA 1967)

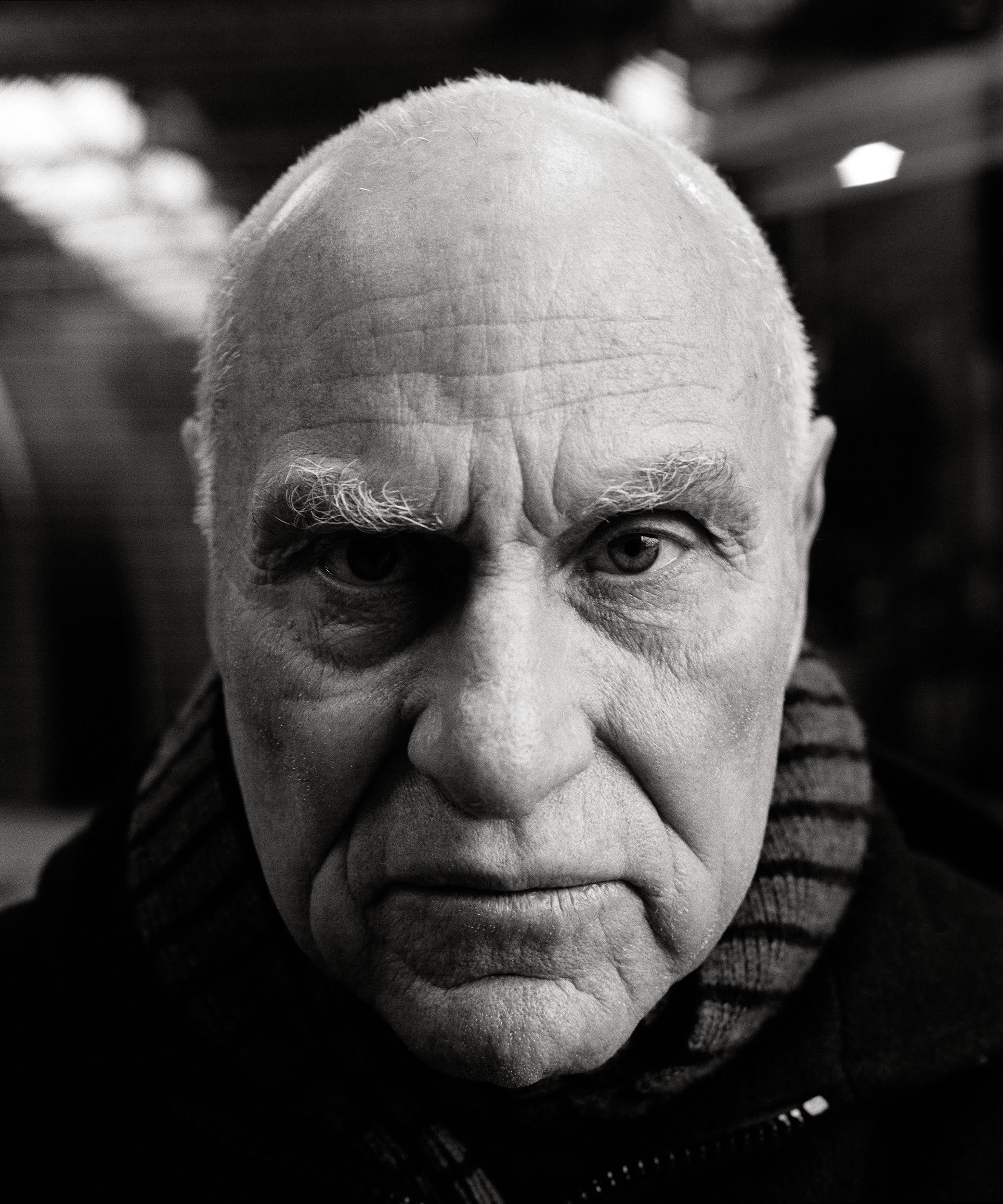
Sculptor Richard Serra (BFA 1962, MFA 1964)

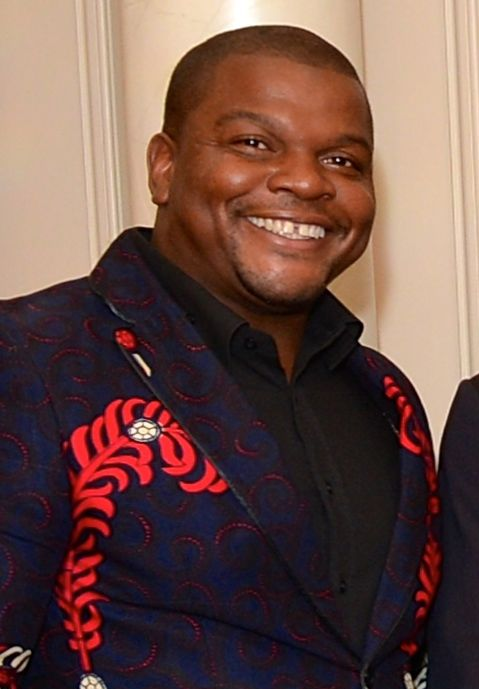
Painter Kehinde Wiley (MFA 2001)
