= Nuclear Medicine Communications =

Scientific journal

Nuclear Medicine Communications (abbreviated Nucl. Med. Commun.) is an official journal of the British Nuclear Medicine Society based in Nottingham, United Kingdom. The journal publishes studies based on radionuclide imaging for basic, preclinical, and clinical research. Areas of interest include radiochemistry, radiopharmacy, radiobiology, radiopharmacology, medical physics, computing and engineering, and technical and nursing professions involved in delivering nuclear medicine services.

Nucl. Med. Commun. has an impact factor of 1.465 and currently ranks 96 among the 129 journals publishing radiology, nuclear medicine, and medical imaging scientific studies. It has an International Standard Serial Number (ISSN) 0143-3636, and an online ISSN 1473-5628. The journal publishes 12 issues each year. The journal allows scientific manuscripts to be published at no charge to the authors, however, the manuscript are not open-access. Authors can pay a fee for the accepted articles to be published as open-access material.

The Nucl. Med. Commun. journal published its first journal in March 1980. The website is operated from Riverwoods, IL, United States. The current editor-in-chief is Professor Jamshed Bmanji based at the University College Hospital, London.
