= Fogleman =

Fogelman is a surname. Notable people with the surname include:

- Ronald Fogleman (born 1942), American General
- Tate Fogleman (born 2000), American racing driver

== See also ==
- Fogelman
- Vogelmann
- Vogelman
