= Oliver Kimberley =

Anglican priest

Oliver James Kimberley was an Anglican priest in the first half of the Twentieth century.

Kimberley was educated at Moore Theological College; and ordained deacon in 1904, and priest in 1905. After a curacy at Wahroonga he was Rector of Erskineville. He was the Secretary of the CMS in New Zealand from 1909 to 1920; and in Australia from 1920 to 1922. He was Vicar of Awatere from 1922 to 1929; Archdeacon of Marlborough from 1929 to 1940; and Archdeacon of Waimea from 1940 to 1949.

His father-in-law Pratt Kempthorne, son Owen and grandson Lawrence were all Archdeacons: Kempthorne and Owen of Waimea and Lawrence of Pegasus.
