= Kantata =

Professional services automation software company

- Type: Private
- Industry: Professional services automation
- Predecessor: Kimble; Mavenlink
- Founded: December 2021
- Headquarters: Irvine, California and London, England
- Key people: Michael Speranza (CEO)
- Website: kantata.com

Kantata is a privately-held software company headquartered in Irvine, California and London. It was founded in 2021 following the merger of professional service automation providers Mavenlink and Kimble Applications.

Kimble Applications Limited was founded in the UK in 2010 by Sean Hoban, Mark Robinson, and David Scott. Mavenlink was founded in California in 2008 by Ray Grainger, Roger Neel, and Sean Crafts. Kantata's PSA software, marketed as Kantata OX and Kantata SX, originated with Kimble and Mavenlink. The company is backed by the private equity firm Accel-KKR.

== See also ==
- Professional services automation
