= Mitek Systems =

American identity verification and image processing company

Mitek Systems, Inc.
- Type: Public
- Traded as: Nasdaq: MITK; Russell 2000 Component
- Industry: Identity Verification Services
- Founded: 1986
- Headquarters: San Diego, California, USA
- Key people: Max Carnecchia (CEO); Cindy White (CMO); David Lyle (CFO); Chris Briggs (SVP Identity)
- Website: www.miteksystems.com

Mitek Systems, Inc. is a software company that specializes in digital identity verification and mobile image processing using artificial intelligence. The company's software is used for depositing checks and opening bank accounts via mobile devices. It also verifies identity documents such as passports, ID cards, and driver's licenses by analyzing a selfie of an individual holding their ID, comparing their face to the photo on the document.

== History ==
The company was founded in 1986, and is headquartered in San Diego, California.

In 2011, it was announced that Mitek intended to expand into mobile imaging software for the health care and insurance industries, in addition to mobile banking.

In 2014, USAA and Mitek Systems, Inc. settled a 2 1/2-year-old dispute over the invention of the technology used for mobile check deposits, with both companies' patents remaining intact and neither side paying the other.

On May 26, 2015, the company acquired IDchecker, a provider of cloud-based identity document verification and facial recognition products.

On October 16, 2017, the company acquired Icar Vision Systems, a Spanish company specializing in customer identity verification.

In August 2023, Mitek revealed that it had received a delisting notice from the Nasdaq Stock Market due to its failure to file quarterly with the U.S. Securities and Exchange Commission on time. The company presented a new plan for compliance to Nasdaq.

== Controversies ==
In 2012, Mitek sued the USAA (United Services Automobile Association) in Delaware on several counts relating to five Mitek patents relating to mobile image capture and breaching licensing agreements. The lawsuit was settled in September 2014 with no payments and both parties acknowledging that each has distinct patent rights.

revived in 2022 by a U.S. appeals judge who claimed the former judge's logic was "not sufficiently complete" and he should reexamine the case.

HyreCar, an app that allows car owners to rent out their vehicles for drivers, uses Mitek technology to verify users' identities. It requires its customers to sign an arbitration agreement so they can't sue the company for violating an Illinois biometric privacy law.

HyreCar customer Joshua Johnson claimed that Mitek violated the Illinois biometric law by collecting and storing driver information. Mitek sought to take the case to arbitration to avoid being sued in court, but in December 2022, the 7th U.S. Circuit Court of Appeals upheld a previous ruling that Mitek is not included in HyreCar's arbitration cause and can be sued in court.
