= Kimberly A. Novick =

US environmental scientist and academic

- Education: Duke University (2002) Duke University (2010)
- Awards: National Science Foundation Early Career Development Award (2016) Thomas Hilker Early Career award in Biogeosciences (2019)
- Scientific career
- Fields: Environmental Science, biometeorology, plant physiology, and hydrology
- Website: https://oneill.indiana.edu/faculty-research/directory/profiles/faculty/full-time/novick-kimberly.html

Kimberly A. Novick is an environmental scientist and a Professor at Indiana University, Bloomington. Her research mostly includes the study of land-atmosphere interactions. She received the Thomas Hilker Early Career Award in Biogeosciences from American Geophysical Union (AGU) in 2019.

== Early life and education ==
In 2002, Novick earned her bachelor's degree in Civil and Environmental Engineering from Duke University. When Novick graduated, she was one of two students who graduated with departmental distinction in the department of Civil and Environmental Engineering. In 2002, Novick was also presented with the William Brewster Snow Award, which is given to students who have not only shown academic success, but also a strong passion for environmental engineering. During the same year, Novick also received the Eric I. Pas Award, which is awarded to students with the most impressive research project. Her research included working in the Duke Forest on "Assessing the Effects of Elevated Atmospheric CO_{2} and LAI Perturbations on Southeastern Grassland Water Vapor and CO_{2} Fluxes."

In pursuit to obtain her Ph.D., Novick went back to Duke University and graduated in 2010 and continued her research at the Duke Forest to study forest carbon and water cycling.

== Career and research ==
After graduating from Duke, Novick has been working as an environmental scientist. She first worked with the United States department of Agriculture (USDA) Forest Services. Novick conducted research at the Coweeta Hydrological Laboratory in North Carolina, where she studied CO_{2} and evapotranspiration in the ecosystem.

Since 2012, Novick has been at the Indiana University, Bloomington. She is a professor, and works at the O’Neill School of Public and Environmental Affairs. Novick now works with the Morgan-Monroe State Forest Flux Tower as well as the tower at Coweeta, both sites are part of the U.S. Department of Energy's AmeriFlux network, which measures CO_{2,} water, and energy changes in the ecosystems. Currently, Novick runs the Morgan-Monroe site where she continues to research the interaction between the land and the atmosphere. Recently, her site has been also interested in studying the effects of a drought on the exchange of carbon in the ecosystem. They discovered that certain vegetation will change how they interact with carbon during a drought.

== Awards and honors ==
- In 2012, Novick received a USDA grant to continue research in the Southern Appalachian area to study water supply in the region.
- In 2016, Novick was awarded Outstanding Faculty Collaborative Research Award for Indiana University, Bloomington
- In 2016, Novick was awarded the National Science Foundation Early CAREER Development Award to study how forests and interact with climate change.
- In 2019, Novick was awarded the Thomas Hilker Early Career award in Biogeosciences.

== Publications ==
Some of Novick's most cited publications include:

- Carbon dioxide and water vapor exchange in a warm temperate grassland, Oceanology, 2004
- Land management and land-cover change have impacts of similar magnitude on surface temperature, Nature Climate Change, 2014
- An evaluation of models for partitioning eddy covariance-measured net ecosystem exchange into photosynthesis and respiration, Agriculture and Forest Meteorology, 2006
- Separating the effects of climate and vegetation on evapotranspiration along a successional chronosequence in the southeastern US, Global Change Biology, 2006
- The increasing importance of atmospheric demand for ecosystem water and carbon fluxes, Nature Climate Change, 2016

== Public engagement ==
Novick advises students and young scientists to grow a big community, and she believes for people to have strong collaborative network. She works with all her students individually to make sure they stay focused and continue their studying.

== Personal life ==
Novick is married and has a son. With her husband she works on creating live music.
