= Kymberly N. Pinder =

American art historian

Kymberly N. Pinder is an American art historian, curator, and university administrator, current dean of the Yale School of Art. In 2021, when Yale appointed Pinder as dean, she became the first woman of color to hold the position of dean of the Yale School of Art.

== Education and career ==
She received her PhD from Yale University in Art History in 1995. Pinder has taught and served in administrative roles at the University of New Mexico (Dean of the College of Fine Arts), the School of the Art Institute of Chicago (Professor, Chair of the Department of Art History, Theory and Criticism and Director of the Graduate Program), and Middlebury College. Starting in April 2020, Pinder served as the Acting President at MassArt. Before taking on the position of Acting President at MassArt, she held the positions of provost and senior vice president of academic affairs. In addition to her role at MassArt, Dr. Pinder is a Boston Public Art Commission member. In June 2021, it was announced that Pinder would be heading the Yale School of Art as its new dean. Pinder will be the first woman of color and only second woman ever to hold this position in Yale's history. She is the first Black female dean in Yale University's history. Pinder began a second five-year term as dean of the Yale School of Art on July 1, 2026.

== Scholarship ==
Pinder's research explores African American visual culture. In 2002, she edited a volume Race-ing Art History, which brought together essays on the importance of including race in art historical conversations. It was the first anthology to encourage a multiculturalism, postcolonialism, and critical race theory lens be placed onto art history. Her 2016 book, Painting the Gospel, highlights instances of strong visual culture in predominantly Black churches, with particular focus on representations of Black Jesus. The book further explores how public art can become an active part of a community while also highlighting the importance of understanding these artworks within their original context.
