= Nontsikelelo Mutiti =

Artist from Zimbabwe

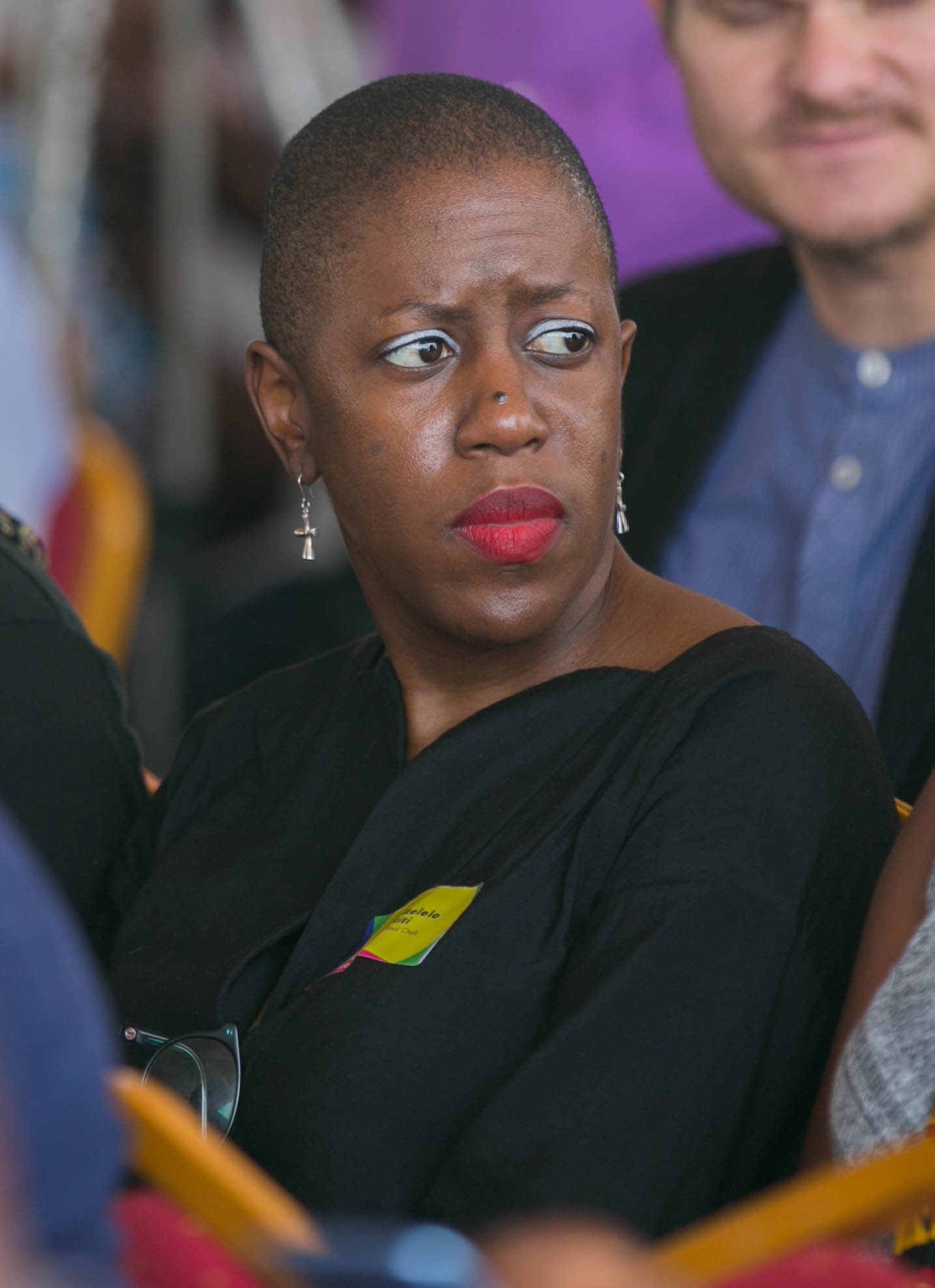
- Photo by Nana Afriyie re:publica 2018
- Born: August 31, 1982 (age 44); Harare, Zimbabwe
- Education: Zimbabwe Institute of Vigital Arts Yale School of Art
- Awards: Joan Mitchell Foundation Emerging Artist Grant; 2015; Alice Kimball English Traveling Fellowship; 2012
- Website: http://nontsikelelomutiti.com/

Nontsikelelo Mutiti (born 31 August 1982) is a graphic designer, artist and educator. Her work focuses on web design, video, print, and book art. She often includes hair braiding in her design work, exploring meanings of braids and hair as elements of the African diaspora carrying political, aesthetic and subjective meanings; she is "interested in the nuanced differences between black cultures". Her work includes printed materials for Black Lives Matter. Since 2022, Mutiti has served as the Director of Graduate Studies in Graphic Design at the Yale School of Art.

== Early life and education ==
Mutiti was born in 1982 in Harare, Zimbabwe. She graduated from the Zimbabwe Institute of Vigital Arts with a diploma in multimedia art in 2007. Mutiti earned an MFA from the Yale School of Art in 2012.

== Collaborations and publishing ==
Mutiti is a co-founder of the Zimbabwe Cultural Centre in Detroit, which encourages collaboration between artists in Detroit and Zimbabwe.

With Tinashe Mushakavanhu, Mutiti co-founded Black Chalk & Co, a creative agency and publishing imprint. Mushakavanhu and Mutiti also lead Reading Zimbabwe, a digital archive of Zimbabwean literature. Mutiti has served as artistic director and cofounder since Reading Zimbabwe was established in late 2016.

== Teaching ==
In June 2022, Mutiti was appointed to Yale University's faculty as the Director of Graduate Studies in Graphic Design. Mutiti became the third director of Yale's graduate graphic design program, following Professor Sheila Levrant de Bretteville’s historic thirty-two year tenure. Mutiti previously served an assistant professor at Virginia Commonwealth University in the Graphic Design department, where she taught between 2017 and 2022. Prior to VCU, Mutiti taught at Purchase College. She lives and works in New York City and Richmond, Virginia.

== Work ==
Mutiti is best known for her artistic investigation of the technical crafts and social practices of hair braiding and self-fashioning in the African diaspora. For example, in a 2014 exhibition at Recess Art, Mutiti drew for inspiration from the space of an African hair braiding salon, as it might be found in New York City or Harare. Mutiti recreated aesthetic markers such as "walls painted in acid green or bright orange, magazine cut outs of celebrities, hair product models, flyers and posters from evangelical churches... [and] the ubiquitous small black television set on top of a cabinet playing Nollywood movies." Mutiti's interests extend from the aesthetics of hair salons to the forms of community and exchange that take place in them. In 2015, as part of Performa, she worked together with Chimurenga and Pan African Space Station to create a functional pop-up salon which hosted a series of conversations.

=== Print ===
- A-A-A (folded posters, 2012)
- Thread (screen print on linoleum tiles, 2012–2014)
- African Hair Braiding Salon Reader (spiral bound booklet, laser print, 2014)
- The Laundromat Project (2014)
- RIP Kiki (2016)
- Requiem (2016)
- How to Wear Cloth (folded posters, fabric, paper, letterpress, 2016)
- Bootleg This (book cloth, book board, laser printed booklet, compact disk, 2016)
- 1960 Free (risograph and laser printing, spiral bound, 2016)
- Black Women Artists for Black Lives Matter (BWAforBLM) (identity, banner, and ephemera, 2016)

=== Video ===
- Unbreakable (2011)
- Pain Revisited Excerpt (2015)
- Just Keep Swimming (2016)

=== Web ===
- Laundromat Project (website redesign, 2014)
- Braiding Braiding (2015)
- Reading Zimbabwe (2016)

== Awards & Residencies ==
- Berlin Artist Program, BKP (2021)
- Soros Arts Fellowship, Open Society Foundation (2019)
- Joan Mitchell Foundation Emerging Artist Grant (2015)
- Alice Kimball English Traveling Fellowship (2012)
- Laundromat Project Create Change Fellow (2012)
- Artist in Residence, Museom of Contemporary Art Detroit
- Artist in Residence, Recess

== Exhibitions ==
- The Metropolitan Museum of Art in New York (2017)
- We Buy Gold in Brooklyn, New York
- Whitney Museum in New York (2016)
- Studio Museum in Harlem (2015)
- Ruka (To Braid/ to knit/ to weave) at Recess Art (2014)
- Edwin Gallery in Michigan
- Yale's Davenport Art Gallery
- Syracuse University
