= Kimble (name) =

Kimble is both a surname and a given name. Notable people with the name include:

== People ==
=== Surname ===
- Alan Kimble (born 1966), English football manager and retired player
- Bo Kimble (born 1966), American retired college and National Basketball Association player
- Darin Kimble (born 1968), Canadian retired National Hockey League player
- Garry Kimble (born 1966), English football manager and retired player
- George C. Kimble (1803–1836), a defender of the Alamo
- H. Jeff Kimble (born 1949), professor of physics at the California Institute of Technology
- John H. Kimble (died 1938), American politician from Maryland
- Joseph Kimble (born 1949), emeritus law professor at Western Michigan University-Cooley Law School
- Nick Kimble, American politician
- Ann Kimble-Hill, American biochemist

=== Given name ===
- Kimble Anders (born 1966), American retired National Football League fullback
- Kimble Rendall (1957–2025), Australian musician and director
- Kimble Sutherland (born 1966), Canadian politician

== Fictional characters ==
- Richard Kimble, protagonist of the TV series The Fugitive and its 1993 film adaptation
- Christine Campbell (character) (née Kimble), title character of the TV series The New Adventures of Old Christine
- Diana Kimble, her daughter Jessica Kimble and granddaughter Stephanie Kimble, in the Friday the 13th film series
- Elise Kimble, alter ego of the DC Comics villain Persuader
- John Kimble, protagonist of the film Kindergarten Cop
- Kimble Hookstraten, a character in Designated Survivor (TV series)
- Sharon Kimble, the maiden name of Sharon Marsh from South Park
