= Gail Kimberly =

American writer

- Born: August 1, 1927; New York, New York, U.S.
- Died: April 8, 2011 (age 83); Placentia, California, U.S.
- Other names: Gail Kimberly Francis, G. K. Francis, Gail Van Achthoven, Dayle Courtney, Alix Andre
- Occupation(s): Writer, secretary

Sunya Gail Kimberly Francis (August 1, 1927 – April 8, 2011) was an American writer based in Los Angeles. She wrote science fiction, horror, gothic romance, and young adult stories and novels in the 1970s and 1980s, and children's fiction for the Los Angeles Times between 1999 and 2003.

== Early life and education ==
Kimberly was born in New York City, the daughter of Wilbert Ross "Kip" Kimberly and Evelyn Martha Cox Kimberly. Her father was born in Canada, and her mother was born in Scotland.

== Career ==
Kimberly was a secretary in Los Angeles and Pasadena, from the 1950s into the early 1970s. She wrote science fiction, horror, gothic romance, and YA stories and novels. Editor Roger Elwood selected stories by Kimberly for several anthologies. In the later 1990s and early 2000s, Kimberly wrote serialized short fiction for the children's page of the Los Angeles Times. She was a member of the California Writers Club, the Los Angeles Science Fantasy Society, the Romance Writers of America and the Science Fiction and Fantasy Writers of America.

== Publications ==
In addition to works under her own name, Kimberly wrote young adult and gothic romance genre fiction under pseudonyms including Alix Andre and Dayle Courtney.

- "For Onomatopoeia's Sake" (1967, poem)
- "The Prince and the Physician" (1969)
- "The Face of the Enemy" (1973)
- "Many Mansions" (1973)
- "Peace, Love, and Food for the Hungry" (1973)
- "The Fire Fountain" (1974)
- "Lady Bountiful" (1974)
- "Minna in the Night Sky" (1974)
- "The Horseman from Hel" (1974)
- "Where Summer Song Rings Hollow" (1975)
- "A Nice Girl Like Me" (1975)
- Flyer (1975)
- "A Little Bit of Recycled Time" (1976)
- "Gloria" (1978)
- Dracula Began (1978)
- Skateboard (1978, novelization of the film Skateboard)
- Star Jewel (1979)
- Secret of the Abbey (1980, as Alix Andre)
- "Ice Road" (1980)
- Goodbye is Just the Beginning (1980)
- The Trail of Bigfoot (1983, as Dayle Courtney)
- "Child of Faerie" (1998)
- "My Cool Sister" (serialized 1999, published in book form in 2003)
- "The Space Travelers" (2000)
- "A Bunch of Presents" (2001)
- "The Otherwhere Ice Show" (2002)
- "'No Way to Go!'" (2003)
- "Requiem"

== Personal life ==
Kimberly married twice. Her first husband was Antonius J. Van Achthoven; they married in 1951, had two children, and divorced in 1974. Her second husband was Kellin D. Francis; they married in 1980. She lived in Michigan in the 1990s. She died in 2011, in Placentia, California, at the age of 83.
