= Kimball High School =

Kimball High School can refer to:

- Kimball Junior/Senior High School, Kimball, Nebraska
- Kimball High School, now Royal Oak High School, in Royal Oak, Michigan
- Justin F. Kimball High School in Dallas, Texas
- John C. Kimball High School in Tracy, California
- Kimball High School (West Virginia), in Kimball, West Virginia
