= USS Kimberly (DD-521) =

Fletcher-class destroyer

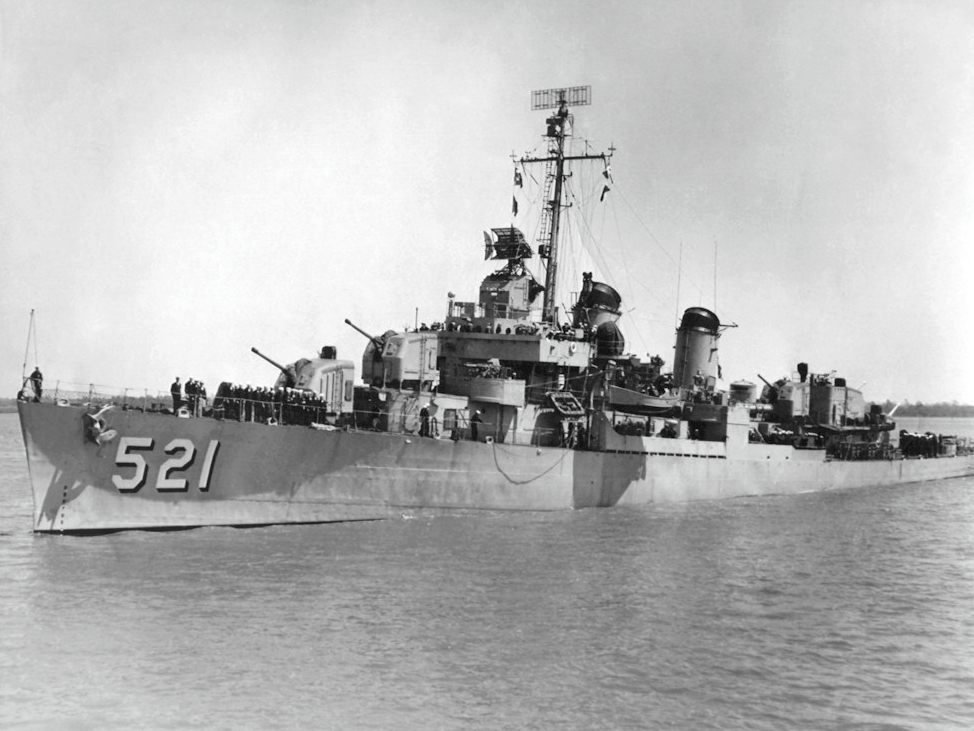
- USS Kimberly underway in 1951

History

United States
- Name: Kimberly
- Namesake: Lewis A. Kimberly
- Builder: Bethlehem Mariners Harbor
- Laid down: 27 July 1942
- Launched: 4 February 1943
- Sponsored by: Mrs. Elsie S Kimberly
- Commissioned: 22 May 1943
- Decommissioned: 5 February 1947
- Recommissioned: 8 February 1951
- Decommissioned: 15 January 1954
- Stricken: 25 January 1974
- Identification: Callsign: NIZD; Hull number: DD-521
- Fate: Transferred to Taiwan, 1 June 1967
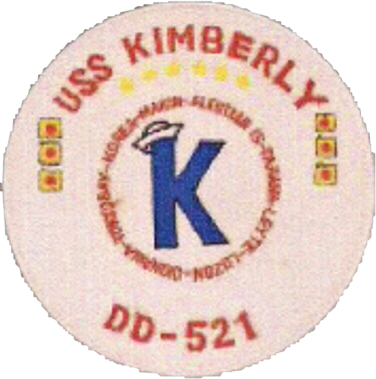
- Badge

History

Taiwan
- Name: An Yang; (安陽)
- Namesake: An Yang
- Acquired: 1 June 1967
- Commissioned: 2 June 1967
- Reclassified: DD-997, 1970; DDG-918, 1979
- Decommissioned: 16 September 1999
- Identification: Hull number: DD-18
- Fate: Sunk as target, 14 October 2003

General characteristics
- Class & type: Fletcher-class destroyer
- Displacement: 2,050 tons
- Length: 376 ft 6 in (114.7 m)
- Beam: 39 ft 8 in (12.1 m)
- Draft: 17 ft 9 in (5.4 m)
- Propulsion: 60,000 shp (45 MW); 2 propellers
- Speed: 35 knots (65 km/h; 40 mph)
- Range: 6500 nmi. (12,000 km) at 15 kt
- Complement: 336
- Armament: 5 × single Mk 12 5 in (127 mm)/38 guns; 5 × twin 40 mm (1.6 in) Bofors AA guns; 7 × single 20 mm (0.8 in) Oerlikon AA guns; 2 × quintuple 21 in (533 mm) torpedo tubes; 6 × single depth charge throwers; 2 × depth charge racks

USS Kimberly (DD-521) was a Fletcher-class destroyer in service with the United States Navy from 1943 to 1947, then from 1951 to 1954. In 1967, she was transferred to the Republic of China Navy where she served as ROCS An Yang (DD-18/DDG-918) until 1999. The destroyer was sunk as a target in 2003.

== Construction and career ==
Kimberly was the second ship of the United States Navy to be named after Rear Admiral Lewis A. Kimberly (1838–1902) an officer in the United States Navy during the American Civil War. She was launched 4 February 1943, by Bethlehem Steel Co., Staten Island, New York (state), sponsored by Miss Elsie S Kimberly, daughter of Admiral Kimberly and commissioned 22 May 1943.

=== Service in the United States Navy ===
After shakedown Kimberly cleared Norfolk 10 September 1943, and steamed to the Pacific. After working up at Pearl Harbor, she arrived off Makin 20 November. Throughout the Gilbert Islands campaign, the destroyer served in ASW screen and supported Marines with naval gunfire support.

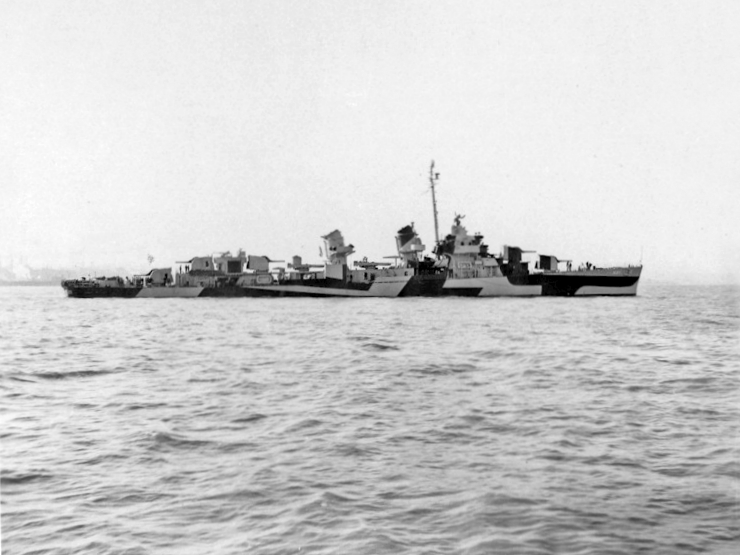
Kimberly off the Mare Island Naval Shipyard on 6 October 1944

Kimberly departed Tarawa 6 December for the West Coast. After repairs at San Francisco, she sailed 22 January 1944, for the Aleutian Islands. Operating with Rear Admiral Wilder D. Baker's Task Force 94 (TF 94), the destroyer departed Attu 1 February to shell antiaircraft batteries. Kimberly remained in the Aleutians for 7 months on ASW patrols, shore bombardment and training exercises, before steaming toward San Francisco on 18 September.

As the tempo of the Pacific War increased, Kimberly arrived at Manus, Admiralty Islands, to prepare for her roles in the Philippines campaign. On 10 November she departed escorting a supply convoy to Leyte Gulf, carrying material to replenish allied forces there. On the evening of 21 December, while Kimberly escorted another convoy to Mangarin Bay, Mindoro, Japanese suicide planes attacked the American ships. During the 2-hour battle, Kimberly's claimed one aircraft and assisted in shooting down two others. After the attack, the convoy proceeded to Mangarin Bay bringing men and material for the construction of an airstrip and a PT-boat base to support the invasion of Luzon.

The destroyer left Leyte 2 January 1945, screening a preinvasion battleship group. En route, during a kamikaze attack, the destroyer claimed another kill. Arriving off Lingayen Gulf 6 January, the bombardment group was immediately placed on alert to ward off the enemy suicide pilots. That day Kimberly claimed two more aircraft. For the remainder of the month, she shelled an enemy railroad and supply centers.

During February she prepared for the Okinawa campaign which would advance allied forces close to the Japanese homeland. Departing San Pedro Bay 21 March for radar picket duty, the destroyer, off the Ryūkyūs, was attacked 26 March by two Aichi D3A "Vals." Despite numerous antiaircraft hits, one enemy aircraft, though damaged, crashed into the aft gun mounts killing 4 men and wounding 57. Kimberly cleared the area 1 April for repairs at Mare Island Naval Shipyard, arriving 25 April.

She sailed from Pearl Harbor 10 August to join the 3rd Fleet in the Far East. After the surrender of Japan, she entered Tokyo Bay 4 September and 2 days later sailed, escorting USS Missouri (BB-63), arriving in Philadelphia 18 October. After Navy Day ceremonies, Kimberly departed Philadelphia 2 November and arrived Charleston, South Carolina, the next day. She remained there until 5 February 1947 when she was placed in reserve.

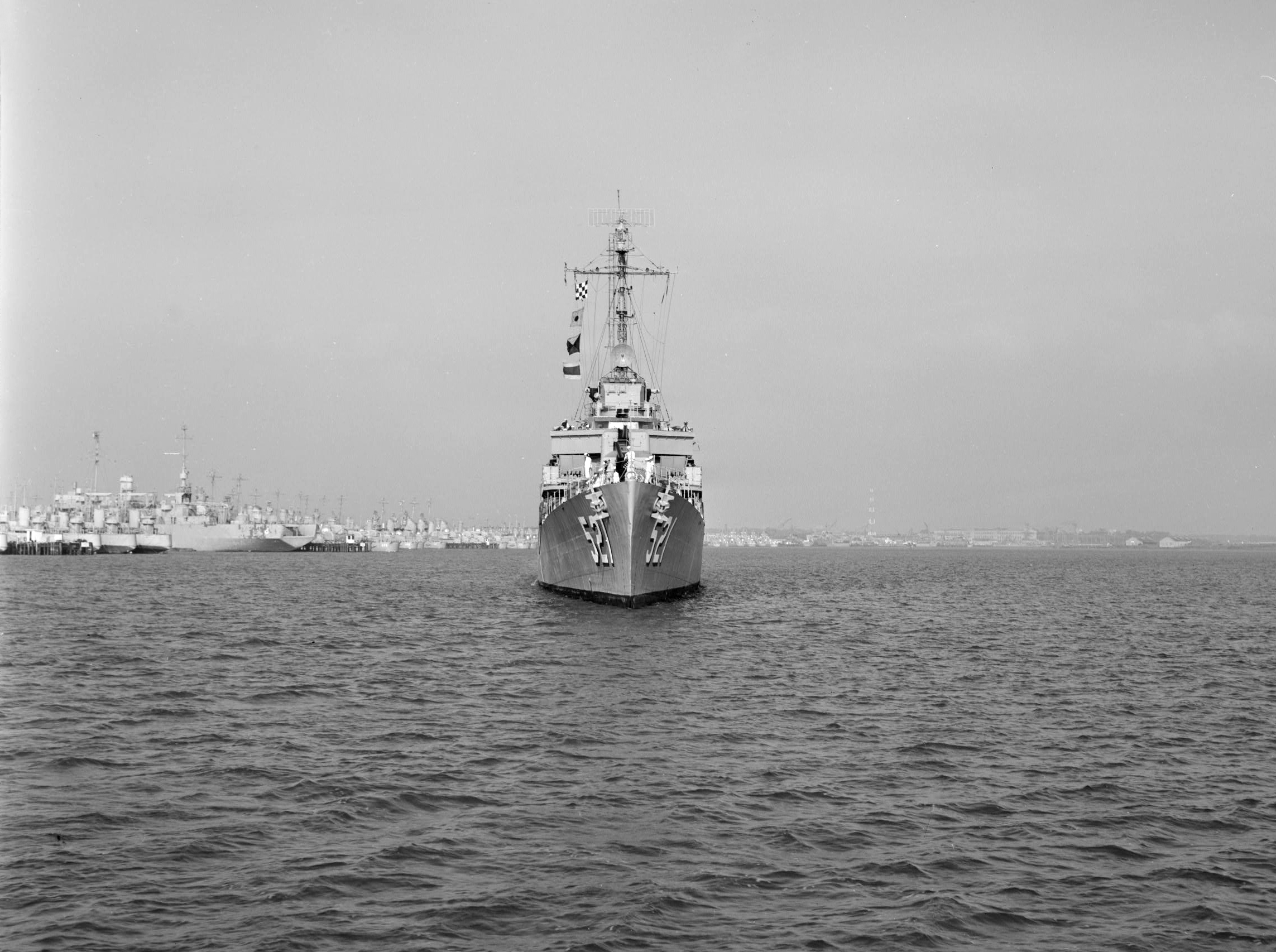
Kimberly underway on 29 September 1953

After the outbreak of hostilities in Korea, Kimberly was recommissioned on 8 February 1951. After shakedown out of Guantanamo Bay and exercises along the coast, she cleared Norfolk on 15 May 1951 and steamed to the Pacific as reinforcement. She arrived on 18 June and 5 days later sailed for fire support operations off the western coast of Korea, as well as Anti-submarine and aircraft screen for the carriers. In mid-September, she arrived off Formosa for patrol operations before sailing 6 October via the Philippines, Suez Canal and the Mediterranean.

Arriving Norfolk on 12 December, Kimberly operated along the Atlantic coast and Caribbean on training exercises until she arrived in Charleston, South Carolina, on 20 June 1953. She remained there and was decommissioned on 15 January 1954. Kimberly received five battle stars for World War II and one for Korean War service.

After 12 years in the Atlantic Reserve Fleet at Charleston, South Carolina, Kimberly proceeded to Boston Naval Shipyard in July 1966 for overhaul prior to being loaned to the government of the Republic of China. The ship was loaned to Taiwan 1 June 1967, where she served in the Republic of China Navy as ROCS An Yang (DD-18).

=== Service in the Republic of China Navy ===
An Yang was commissioned on the same day on 1 June 1967.

On 5 January 1976, the ship underwent overhaul and Liulong project at the No. 1 Naval Shipyard. The ship uses the Wuyi fire control and command system, and her main reconnaissance and search equipment are the Mark 35 fire-control radar, AN/SPS-6C air-search radar, HR-76C fire-control radar, SPSlOV air-search radar, AN/SPS-58C air-search radar, ARGO-681 electronic interception machine, DSQS2lCZ hull sonar. The main weapons and equipment include two single 5-inch gun, one OTO 76mm gun, two twin Bofors 40mm gun, Mark 10 hedgehog, CR-201 Trainable Chaff Rocket Launcher. A Hsiung Feng I missile launcher was added on her after superstructure. Depth charges were added on rails and two triple Mark 32 torpedo tubes.

In 1970, the number was changed to DD-997, and in 1979.

The ship number was again changed to DDG-918 in the mid-1980s.

On 29 June 1981, at the Navy's No. 1 Shipyard The Fuyang Project and the Wujin No. 1 project were implemented, and the Hsiung Feng I missile and the Haishu missile were installed to turn the ship into a missile.

She was decommissioned on 16 September 1999 and sunk as a target by ROCS Hai Lung on 14 October 2003.
