= Kimball (given name) =

Kimball is a given name derived from the English surname Kimball. Notable people and characters with the name include:

== People ==
- Kimball Allen (born 1982), American writer, journalist, playwright, and actor
- Kimball Atwood, American medical doctor and researcher
- Kimball Bent (1837–1916), American soldier and adventurer in New Zealand
- Kimball Chase Atwood III (1921–1992), American geneticist
- Kimball J. Daniels (born 1973), Canadian ice hockey player in the NHL
- Kimball H. Dimmick, 19th-century American politician from California
- James Kimball "Kim" Gannon (1900–1974), American songwriter
- Kimball Kjar (born 1978), American international rugby union player
- Kimball Reynierse (born 1961), Aruban Olympic long-distance runner
- Kimball Taylor, American writer
- Kimball Young (1893–1972), American psychologist and sociologist

== Fictional characters ==
- Kimball Cho, agent in the hit television show The Mentalist
- Kimball Kinnison, hero of the first three of the original novels in E. E. Smith's Lensman series
- Kimball O'Hara, the protagonist of Rudyard Kipling's novel Kim
