= Jamshed Bomanji =

Jamshed Bomanji OBE is a full professor, clinical lead, and head of the Institute of Nuclear medicine department at the University College Hospital (UCLH) NHS foundation trust based in London, UK.

== Education and career ==
Professor Bomanji obtained a graduate degree (MBBS) from the University of Punjab (Pakistan) in 1980, and a PhD in 1987. His current interests are in the area of diagnostic and therapeutic of Neurology, Oncology, Cardiology, and Nephrology/Urology using Nuclear medicine.

Jamshed Bomanji also serves as the editor-in-chief at the Nuclear Medicine Communications. His comments on cancer procedures using nuclear medicine techniques are documented by Hospitals and private companies.

== Books ==
Jamshed has authored 20 book Chapters. Some of them are in the areas including, not limited to, Neuroendocrine Tumours, Tissue Characterization, Molecular radiotherapy in Children, and Brain Disorder. He has an edited book titled "A History of Radionuclide Studies in the UK: 50th Anniversary of the British Nuclear Medicine". He is Editor Hybrid Imaging series, 14 books.

== Publications ==
He has published more than 295 scientific Manuscripts, with over 6000 Citations. His manuscript titled "Functional imaging of neuroendocrine tumors with combined PET/CT using ^{68}Ga‐DOTATATE (DOTA‐D Phe^{1},Tyr^{3}‐octreotate) and ^{18}F‐FDG" published in 2008 has been cited more than 300 times alone. He published his first research paper in 1984 titled "123 I meta-iodo-benzyl guanidine: Synthesis and imaging the adrenal medulla and phaeochromocytoma" in the Journal of Nuclear Medicine in Research and Practice. Launched new suite of educational PET/CT webinars for the British Institute of Radiology 2019.
