= Kimball Taylor =

American writer (born 1973)

- Born: Kimball Taylor; 1973 (age 52–53); San Diego, CA
- Occupations: Author, Journalist, Speaker
- Writing career
- Genres: creative writing, documentary nonfiction
- Notable works: • The Coyote's Bicycle • Return by Water • Drive Fast and Take Chances
- Notable awards: 86th Annual California Book Awards Finalist; 2017
- Website: KimballTaylor.com

Kimball Taylor is an American writer and speaker on ocean issues, the environment, and bringing attention to the complex realities of the US-Mexican border.

== Works ==
In his first book, Return by Water: Surf Stories and Adventures (2005, Dimdim Publishing) Taylor describes the lives of surfers in several countries.

In 2013, Taylor and Dimdim published a follow-up book, Drive Fast and Take Chances, about surf obsession. It contains profiles of 15 people notably fixated with riding, hunting down, and discovering waves.

In 2008, while on assignment investigating thousands of tires that regularly wash down the Tijuana River during rains, Taylor stumbled upon a massive and mysterious pile of discarded bicycles. His unraveling the mystery of those thousands of bicycles became the genesis of his third book: The Coyote's Bicycle: The Untold Story of 7,000 Bicycles and the Rise of a Borderland Empire.

=== Articles ===
Taylor has written over 27 articles for Surfer Magazine. His story about secret spots and surf imperialism in Mainland Mexico, The Search, was published in Volume 15 number 6 of The Surfers Journal. He has also had work published in The Atlantic magazine.

=== Speaking ===
Kimball Taylor is sometimes asked to speak about writing and journalism. He also speaks on ocean issues from his years of writing for surfing journals, and following the publication of The Coyote's bicycle, Taylor is occasionally asked to speak on the issues of the Mexican border and the economics of illegal immigration, two issues that gained prominence when Donald Trump made them a policy of his presidency.

In 2016, he was asked to be part of a panel discussion of the US-Mexico border at the fourth annual San Antonio Book Festival.

In 2017, he was asked to be on a panel discussion of California at the 22nd annual Los Angeles Times Festival of Books.

== Awards and honors ==
In 2017 Taylor was selected as a finalist in the 86th Annual California Book Awards by the Commonwealth Club of California.
