= Lewis Kimberly =

United States Navy admiral (1830–1902)

Lewis Ashfield Kimberly
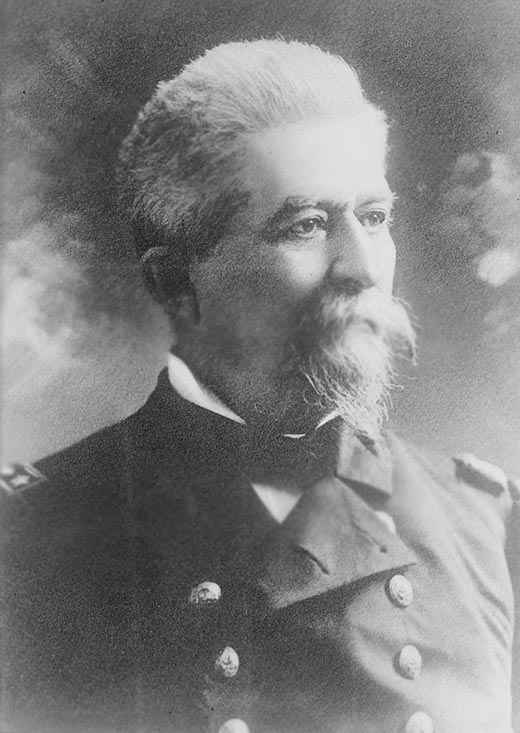
- Portrait of Kimberly, late 1880s
- Born: April 22, 1830; Troy, New York
- Died: January 28, 1902 (aged 71); West Newton, Massachusetts
- Military career
- Allegiance: United States of America
- Branch: United States Navy
- Service years: 1846–1892
- Rank: Rear admiral
- Commands: USS Benicia; USS Canonicus; USS Monongahela; USS Omaha; Pacific Squadron
- Conflicts: American Civil War; Korean Expedition; Samoan crisis

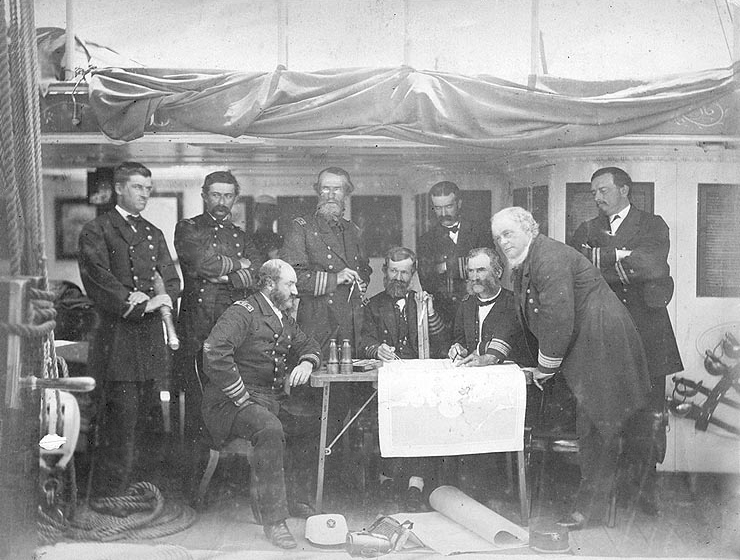
A posed photograph of U.S. Navy officers holding a council of war aboard the Asiatic Squadron flagship, the steam frigate USS Colorado, off Korea in June 1871 prior to the Korean Expedition. Commander Lewis Kimberly, commanding officer of the sloop-of-war USS Benicia, stands second from left.

Rear Admiral Lewis Ashfield Kimberly (April 22, 1830 – January 28, 1902) was an officer in the United States Navy during the American Civil War and the years following.

== Biography ==
=== Early life and career ===
Kimberly was born in Troy, New York, and was appointed a midshipman on 8 December 1846. He served aboard the sloop Jamestown in the Africa Squadron in 1847–50, then in the Pacific aboard the frigate Raritan during 1850–52, receiving promotion to passed midshipman on June 8, 1852. He then returned to African waters, serving in the sloops Decatur and Dale in 1853–56, and was promoted to master and lieutenant on September 15 and 16, 1855. Kimberly spent some time stationed at the Boston Navy Yard, and then served aboard the sloop Germantown in the East India Squadron between July 1857 and April 1860, before joining the newly commissioned steam sloop Richmond which sailed for the Mediterranean in October 1860, finally returning to the United States in July 1861 after the outbreak of the Civil War.

Between 1856 and 1860, he kept a notebook of doodles, sketches, and watercolors. Themes included geometric designs, architectural drawings, caricatures, cipher codes, and sketches of his colleagues. In 2008, the USS Constitution Museum acquired it.

=== Civil War service ===
In 1861–62 Kimberly served aboard the frigate Potomac in the West Gulf Blockading Squadron, taking part in the Mississippi River operations at Port Hudson, Grand Gulf, and Vicksburg, and receiving promotion to lieutenant commander on July 16, 1862. In 1863–64 he served as the executive officer of the steam sloop Hartford, seeing action at the Battle of Mobile Bay, after which he was warmly commended for his gallant and efficient service. After the war, he joined the Military Order of the Loyal Legion of the United States.

=== Post-war commands ===
From May 1865 Kimberly served aboard the steam frigate Colorado, the flagship of the European Squadron, receiving promotion to commander on July 25, 1866, and returning the United States in September 1867. He commanded the receiving ship at New York in 1867–70, then the screw sloop Benicia on the Asiatic Station in 1870–72, taking part in the Korean expedition in May–July 1871, serving as the commander of the landing forces. He then commanded the monitor Canonicus along the east coast in 1873–74.

Kimberly was promoted to captain on October 3, 1874, and commanded the sloop Monongahela on the South Atlantic Station in 1875–76, and the screw sloop Omaha in the Pacific in 1877–78. During the early 1880s Kimberly served at the New York Navy Yard, and was the President of the Examining and Retiring Board in 1883–85, gaining promotion to commodore on September 27, 1884. He was appointed Commandant of the Boston Navy Yard in 1885, and attained the rank of rear admiral on January 26, 1887. He was then appointed the Commander-in-Chief of the Pacific Squadron. In March 1889, during the Samoan crisis, his flagship Trenton was struck by a violent cyclone while at harbor at Apia. Guiding his men with the words, "If we go down, let us do so with our flag flying," Kimberly skillfully beached his flagship, losing only one man in the raging storm that wrecked Trenton. Following his return to the United States in January 1890, Kimberly was appointed President of the Board of Inspection and Survey; holding the post until his retirement on April 2, 1892.

Rear Admiral Kimberly died on January 28, 1902, in West Newton, Massachusetts.

== Namesakes ==
Two U.S. Navy destroyers have been named USS Kimberly his honor; DD-80 (1918–1939) and DD-521 (1943–1967).
