= Ralph Kimbell =

English cricketer

Personal information
- Full name: Ralph Raymond Kimbell
- Born: 12 June 1884; Boughton, Northamptonshire, England
- Died: 4 August 1963 (aged 79); Ledbury, Herefordshire, England

Domestic team information
- Years: Team
- 1925: Oxfordshire
- 1908: Northamptonshire

Career statistics
Competition	First-class
Matches	1
Runs scored	4
Batting average	2.00
100s/50s	–/–
Top score	4
Balls bowled	74
Wickets	2
Bowling average	22.50
5 wickets in innings	–
10 wickets in match	–
Best bowling	2/45
Catches/stumpings	–/–
- Source: Cricinfo, 24 May 2011

Ralph Raymond Kimbell (12 June 1884 – 4 August 1964) was an English cricketer. Kimbell's batting and bowling styles are unknown. He was born in Boughton, Northamptonshire.

Kimbell played his only first-class match for Northamptonshire in the 1908 County Championship against Essex. In this match, he was dismissed for a duck by Johnny Douglas in Northamptonshire's first-innings. In their second-innings he was dismissed for 4 runs by Bill Reeves. With the ball, he took 2 wickets, those of Arnold Read and Walter Mead in the Essex first-innings.

Gilbert later made 2 Minor Counties Championship appearances in 1925 for Oxfordshire against Monmouthshire and Berkshire. He died on 4 August 1963.
