= Professional services automation =

Software to assist with billing for time

Professional services automation (PSA) is software designed to assist professionals, such as lawyers, auditors, and IT consultants, with project management and resource management for client projects and utilization rate management for billable staff. In the IT sector, PSA is frequently integrated with remote monitoring and management (RMM) tools to provide a comprehensive solution for managing service delivery and technical operations.

== Market ==
The global market for professional services automation software was valued at approximately $12.4 billion in 2024 and was projected to grow to $40.3 billion by 2033.

Among managed service providers, help desk or service desk support is one of the most commonly delivered services alongside remote monitoring and management (RMM); a 2024 industry survey found 93% of respondents on the Channel Futures MSP 501 list offered help desk/service desk support, compared with 88% offering RMM.

Typical PSA functions include project management and documentation, time recording, billing, reporting, and resource utilization. These features are often integrated with accounting, Customer Relationship Management (CRM) systems, and payroll systems in order to improve efficiency of overall operations. As a result, in addition to better managing client projects, independent contractors can prevent lost revenue and slow billing cycles.

Ultimately PSA software suites allow users to integrate industry-appropriate metrics in order to better understand operations and, in turn, improve efficiency and profitability. As businesses grow, the size and complexity of their projects tend to increase as well. PSA software is used to provide visibility into mid-project profitability.

== Software types ==
In its simplest form, PSA software may offer only timesheet systems (including expense reporting and project management). However, in their most robust incarnation they can also include customer relationship management (CRM), resource management, opportunity and knowledge management.
