= USS Kimberly (DD-80) =

Wickes-class destroyer

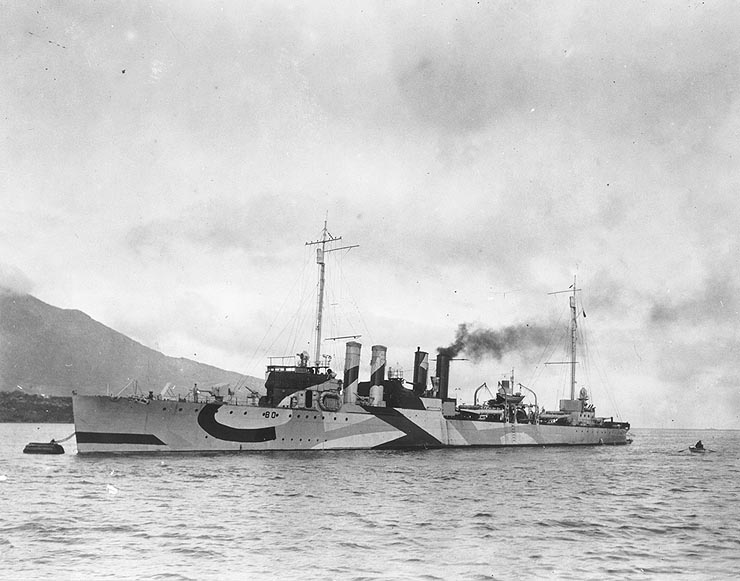
- USS Kimberly (DD-80)

History

United States
- Namesake: Lewis Ashfield Kimberly
- Builder: Fore River Shipyard, Quincy, Massachusetts
- Laid down: 21 June 1917
- Launched: 14 December 1917
- Commissioned: 26 April 1918
- Decommissioned: 30 June 1922
- Stricken: 25 January 1937
- Fate: Sold for scrap 20 April 1939

General characteristics
- Class & type: Wickes-class destroyer
- Displacement: 1,202–1,208 long tons (1,221–1,227 t) (standard); 1,295–1,322 long tons (1,316–1,343 t) (deep load)
- Length: 314 ft 4 in (95.8 m)
- Beam: 30 ft 11 in (9.42 m)
- Draught: 9 ft 10 in (3.0 m)
- Installed power: 27,000 shp (20,000 kW); 4 water-tube boilers
- Propulsion: 2 shafts, 2 steam turbines
- Speed: 35 knots (65 km/h; 40 mph) (design)
- Range: 2,500 nautical miles (4,600 km; 2,900 mi) at 20 knots (37 km/h; 23 mph) (design)
- Complement: 6 officers, 108 enlisted men
- Armament: 4 × single 4-inch (102 mm) guns; 2 × single 1-pounder AA guns; 4 × triple 21 inch (533 mm) torpedo tubes; 2 × depth charge rails

USS Kimberly (DD-80) was a Wickes-class destroyer built for the United States Navy during World War I.

== Description ==
The Wickes class was an improved and faster version of the preceding Caldwell-class. Two different designs were prepared to the same specification that mainly differed in the turbines and boilers used. The ships built to the Bethlehem Steel design, built in the Fore River and Union Iron Works shipyards, mostly used Yarrow boilers that deteriorated badly during service and were mostly scrapped during the 1930s. The ships displaced 1,202–1,208 long tons (1,221–1,227 t) at standard load and 1,295–1,322 long tons (1,316–1,343 t) at deep load. They had an overall length of 314 feet 4 inches (95.8 m), a beam of 30 feet 11 inches (9.4 m) and a draught of 9 feet 10 inches (3.0 m). They had a crew of 6 officers and 108 enlisted men.

Performance differed radically between the ships of the class, often due to poor workmanship. The Wickes class was powered by two steam turbines, each driving one propeller shaft, using steam provided by four water-tube boilers. The turbines were designed to produce a total of 27,000 shaft horsepower (20,000 kW) intended to reach a speed of 35 knots (65 km/h; 40 mph). The ships carried 225 long tons (229 t) of fuel oil which was intended gave them a range of 2,500 nautical miles (4,600 km; 2,900 mi) at 20 knots (37 km/h; 23 mph).

The ships were armed with four 4-inch (102 mm) guns in single mounts and were fitted with two 1-pounder guns for anti-aircraft defense. Their primary weapon, though, was their torpedo battery of a dozen 21 inch (533 mm) torpedo tubes in four triple mounts. In many ships a shortage of 1-pounders caused them to be replaced by 3-inch (76 mm) anti-aircraft (AA) guns. They also carried a pair of depth charge rails. A "Y-gun" depth charge thrower was added to many ships.

== Construction and career ==
Kimberly, named for Lewis Ashfield Kimberly, was launched 14 December 1917, by Fore River Shipbuilding Company, Quincy, Massachusetts; sponsored by Miss Elsie S. Kimberly, daughter of Rear Admiral Kimberly; and commissioned 26 April 1918.

After shakedown Kimberly cleared Boston 19 May 1918, escorting a convoy to the United Kingdom. After her arrival in June, the destroyer spent the remainder of the war protecting ships bound for the battle zones in Europe from the British Isles. She departed Queenstown, Ireland, 26 December; and, after arrival Boston 8 January 1919, Kimberly engaged in training operations along the coast. In May the destroyer served as a lifeguard ship in New England waters during the world's first transatlantic flight—that of the Navy's NC-4 hydroplane commanded by Lt. Comdr. Albert C. Read.

In August 1918, Kimberly, with Undersecretary of the Navy Franklin D Roosevelt and the First Lord of the Admiralty Sir Eric Geddes on board, took a short cruise from Pembroke to Queenstown, escorted by the cruiser HMS Patrol.

Kimberly completed maneuvers out of Newport, and entered Boston Navy Yard for extensive repairs. She joined the Destroyer Force at Newport 18 April 1921, and throughout the summer operated with submarines. Information gained through these early experiments was of great value in refining the techniques of undersea warfare. Kimberly spent the winter at Charleston, South Carolina, before arriving Philadelphia 29 March 1922, where she decommissioned 30 June. Her hull was sold to Boston Iron & Metal Company, Baltimore, Maryland, for scrapping.
