= Percy Kimberley =

Australian rules footballer

Personal information
- Full name: Percy Cooke Kimberley
- Born: 8 January 1878; Collingwood, Victoria
- Died: 10 December 1949 (aged 71); Hawthorn East, Victoria

Playing career^{1}
Years	Club	Games (Goals)
1897	Fitzroy	5 (0)
- ^{1} Playing statistics correct to the end of 1897.

Percy Cooke Kimberley (8 January 1878 – 10 December 1949) was an Australian rules footballer who played with Fitzroy in the Victorian Football League (VFL).

== Sources ==
- Holmesby, Russell & Main, Jim (2009). The Encyclopedia of AFL Footballers. 8th ed. Melbourne: Bas Publishing.
- Percy Kimberley's playing statistics from AFL Tables
