= City Heat =

1984 film by Richard Benjamin

- Theatrical release poster by Bill Gold
- Directed by: Richard Benjamin
- Screenplay by: Blake Edwards (as Sam O. Brown); Joseph C. Stinson
- Story by: Blake Edwards (as Sam O. Brown)
- Produced by: Fritz Manes
- Starring: Clint Eastwood; Burt Reynolds; Jane Alexander; Madeline Kahn; Rip Torn; Irene Cara; Richard Roundtree; Tony Lo Bianco
- Cinematography: Nick McLean
- Edited by: Jacqueline Cambas
- Music by: Lennie Niehaus
- Production companies: The Malpaso Company; Deliverance Productions
- Distributed by: Warner Bros.
- Release date: December 7, 1984
- Running time: 97 minutes
- Country: United States
- Language: English
- Budget: $25 million
- Box office: $38.3 million

City Heat is a 1984 American buddy-crime comedy film starring Clint Eastwood and Burt Reynolds, written by Blake Edwards and directed by Richard Benjamin.

== Plot ==
In Kansas City, 1933, police lieutenant Speer is having coffee at a diner when two men ambush a former cop turned private eye named Mike Murphy. Speer ignores them scuffling, but when a goon causes him to spill his coffee, he throws both goons out the front door. Murphy, who had been good friends with Speer before leaving the force, sarcastically thanks Speer for saving his life.

Murphy is unable to commit to his newest romantic interest, a rich socialite named Caroline Howley. His secretary Addy loves both men, tenderly kissing Murphy goodbye before leaving on a date with Speer. They go to a boxing match where mob boss Leon Coll is present. Murphy's partner Diehl Swift is also there, and seems to be in cahoots with Primo Pitt and his gang. Swift carries a suitcase allegedly containing the accounting records of Coll's operations, ledgers wanted by both Pitt's gang and Coll's gang. Coll's bookkeeper has the actual ledgers, and met with Swift earlier at a club where black singer Ginny Lee is the star attraction. Speer and Addy tail Swift from the boxing ring to his apartment where he's confronted by Pitt and his thugs. Ginny is taken hostage but escapes and Swift is killed. A thug opens the suitcase, finds it empty, and throws Swift's body out the window.

Murphy vows revenge on Pitt and Speer agrees to form an alliance. Ginny is confronted by Pitt's thugs outside a theater and seriously injured by a car as she tries to escape. Murphy shows Addy the actual ledgers in his apartment, and two goons shoot their way into his apartment. Murphy hits them with a baseball bat and flees as a gun fight between Coll's men and Pitt's men erupts on the street below. Speer finishes the fight with a shotgun.

Caroline, kidnapped by Pitt's gang to extort the records from Murphy, is held hostage in a high class bordello. Speer and Murphy rescue her. Coll arrives with Addy at gunpoint, demanding the ledgers. Murphy exchanges the books for Addy, but the suitcase is booby-trapped and Coll is blown up in his car.

Speer, Addy, Murphy, and Caroline double-date at the club, listening to Ginny sing, their evening ending when Murphy's smart mouth provokes a brawl.

== Cast ==
- Clint Eastwood as Lieutenant Speer
- Burt Reynolds as Mike Murphy
- Jane Alexander as Addy
- Madeline Kahn as Caroline Howley
- Rip Torn as Primo Pitt
- Beau Starr as Pitt Lookout
- Irene Cara as Ginny Lee
- Richard Roundtree as Diehl Swift
- Tony Lo Bianco as Leon Coll
- William Sanderson as Lonnie Ash
- Nicholas Worth as Troy Roker
- Robert Davi as Nino
- Art LaFleur as "Bruiser"
- Arthur Malet as Doc Loomis
- Jack Nance as Aram Strossell
- Tom Spratley as Chauffeur
- Tab Thacker as Tuck

== Production ==
Blake Edwards wrote the script, initially titled Kansas City Jazz. He originally wrote the script in the 1970s while living in Switzerland. "I really wrote the story for myself," says Edwards. "But when Julie read it, she thought it was the best thing I'd done and over the years friends urged me to film it. So to see it turned into something completely different was very painful for me."

Edwards originally was attached to direct, but he was fired during pre-production and replaced with Richard Benjamin. Edwards retained co-writing credit under the pseudonym Sam O. Brown, the initials of which are S.O.B., a reference to his earlier film in which Andrews acted.

"The whole thing was such a horrendous experience, it could have come right out of S.O.B.," said Edwards. 'In fact it inspired me to write S.O.B. 2.'

Burt Reynolds later recalled:

If you could just release the announcement for City Heat and not have to look at the film, it'd be the most successful picture I'd ever been in. Blake laid out his way for Clint to play his part. To me, it was clearly apparent that Blake's way was in no way how Clint saw the part. Clint didn't say anything except his Gary Cooper comments like "Yup" and "Nope." Clint and I went home in his truck, and he still didn't say anything until we were halfway there. Finally he said "I guess this won't be the film we do together." I said "I didn't think so." Warner Bros. really wanted to make the film. I think they thought like I did that it would be one of those pictures which would look great in the catalogue...Clint likes a director he gets along with, which makes a lot of sense to me...Blake's dismissal hurt him badly. I don't think he's ever gotten over it.

Eastwood was cast as the lead and received a salary of $4 million.

Filming began in February 1984. On the first day, Reynolds was accidentally hit in the face with a metal chair by a stuntman during a fight scene. His jaw was broken, and he was restricted to a liquid diet, causing him to lose over 30 pounds by the time filming wrapped. His condition made headlines in the tabloids, which speculated he had AIDS.

On Monday, September 20, 2021, an interview with the film's director Richard Benjamin was released on Gilbert Gottfried's Amazing Colossal Podcast that contradicted this story of a stunt injury. Benjamin said that Reynolds’ jaw injury was caused when the actor fell from a make-up chair and hit his jaw.

== Soundtrack ==
Clint Eastwood, a jazz aficionado, is one of the pianists heard on jazz-oriented soundtrack composed by Lennie Niehaus.

== Release and reception ==
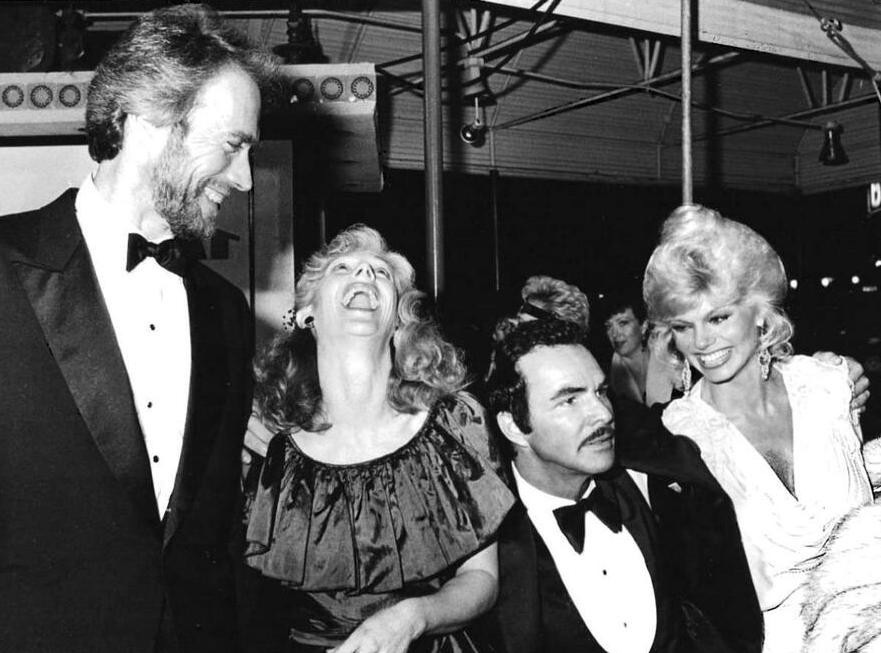
Clint Eastwood, Sondra Locke, Burt Reynolds and Loni Anderson at the premiere

City Heat was released in United States theaters in December 1984. It grossed $38.3 million at the North American box office.

For his roles in this film and Cannonball Run II, Reynolds was nominated for a Razzie Award for Worst Actor at the 5th Golden Raspberry Awards. Reynolds later recalled:

Ten days after shooting began, I knew I was going to take the fall. Clint was playing formula Clint that always worked for Clint. I was playing Jack Lemmon in this strange film where people were getting blown away. I never read a review of the film because I knew I was going to get killed by the critics. The public wanted Boom Town or to see us in a contemporary film. They didn't want Dirty Harry vs. the Wimp. It's regrettable the material wasn't there because Hollywood or maybe just Warner Bros. will never let Clint and I act together again.

City Heat received lackluster reviews, and critics expressed their disappointment with the script and the pairing of the two star actors. On Rotten Tomatoes, 14 of the 18 reviewers cited gave the film a "rotten" review for a score of 22% with a mean of 4.7 of a possible 10. On Metacritic, the film has a weighted average score of 39 out of 100, based on 11 critics, indicating "generally unfavorable" reviews. Roger Ebert gave the film half a star, asking "How do travesties like this get made?" and "a complete, shocking mess". Gene Siskel gave the film zero stars, writing "Save for two moments when Eastwood does an amusing parody of his angry squint, City Heat is devoid of humor, excitement and amazingly, a comprehensible story."

Janet Maslin was more positive, writing "overdressed and overplotted as it is, City Heat benefits greatly from the sardonic teamwork of Clint Eastwood and Burt Reynolds. Without them the film would be eminently forgettable, but their bantering gives it an enjoyable edge". According to Maslin:

[T]he film...manages to be both cumbersome and slight. As he did in My Favorite Year and, to some extent, in Racing with the Moon, Richard Benjamin has settled on an evocative time period and a top-notch cast and more or less left things at that. City Heat devotes much more energy to props, sets and outfits than to the dramatic streamlining it so badly needed. The screenplay - which is part The Sting, part Sam Spade and part kitchen sink - is either a hopelessly convoluted genre piece or a much too subtle take-off on the same.

Variety wrote of the star duo: 'This will hardly go down as one of the highlights in either of their careers, but there remains a certain pleasure just in seeing them square off together in a good-natured arm-wrestling match of charisma and star voltage. Nevertheless, one might have hoped for material more exciting than this hokum.' Paul Attanasio of The Washington Post criticized the "embarrassingly broad comedy and Benjamin's smarmy fealty toward his leads. Inside this star vehicle, there's a real movie screaming for air.' Kevin Thomas of the Los Angeles Times wrote that Eastwood and Reynolds were "in fine fettle on their own and together, playing off each other beautifully. But the pleasure derived in watching them poke fun at themselves and each other in this period gangster comedy is spoiled by a numbing display of violence that is far too literal for such hokum."

== Bibliography ==
- Hughes, Howard (2009). Aim for the Heart. London: I.B. Tauris. ISBN 978-1-84511-902-7.
