= Tourist Trap (1998 film) =

- Genre: Comedy
- Written by: Andy Breckman
- Directed by: Richard Benjamin
- Starring: Daniel Stern; Julie Hagerty; David Rasche; Paul Giamatti
- Music by: Cynthia Millar
- Country of origin: United States
- Original language: English

Production
- Executive producers: Carol Baum; Sandy Gallin; Scott Immergut
- Producer: Jeffrey Lampert
- Cinematography: Ron Orieux
- Editor: Jacqueline Cambas
- Running time: 89 minutes
- Production companies: Disney Telefilms; Sandollar Productions

Original release
- Network: ABC
- Release: April 5, 1998

Tourist Trap is a 1998 American made-for-television comedy film that first aired as part of The Wonderful World of Disney on ABC on October 5, 1997 and produced by Disney Telefilms and Sandollar Productions.

== Plot ==
A middle aged father sets out on an RV trip with his family, to follow in the footsteps of his great grandfather based on an old Civil War diary.

== Cast ==
- Daniel Stern as George W. Piper
- Julie Hagerty as Bess Piper
- David Rasche as Derek Early
- Paul Giamatti as Jeremiah Piper
- Margot Finley as Rachel Piper
- Ryan Reynolds as Wade Early
- Walter Olkewicz as Mr. Bloom
- Rodney Eastman as Stork
- Blair Slater as Josh Piper
- Brendan Fletcher as Kyle Early

== Production ==
In December 1996, it was reported that Andy Breckman scripted Tourist Trap would be co-produced with Sandollar Productions as part of a slate of projects to be developed as a television films for American Broadcasting Company. Richard Benjamin would serve as director while the cast would consist of Daniel Stern, Julie Hagerty, and Paul Giamatti.

The film was shot from June through July 1997.

== Broadcast and reception ==
Tourist Trap was broadcast as a television film for The Wonderful World of Disney on April 5, 1998. The film was released on home video on May 16, 2000.

It received a negative review from Bob Batz in the Dayton Daily News.
