= Forensic Factor =

- Genre: True crime
- Country of origin: Canada
- No. of seasons: 6
- No. of episodes: 42

Original release
- Network: Discovery Channel
- Release: January 9, 2003 – August 13, 2010

Forensic Factor is a Canadian true crime docuseries, which airs on Discovery Channel Canada, Sun TV, and the True Crime Network. The series, which uses an anthology format, features forensic techniques and their application in crime-solving by examining notable cases.

== Episodes ==
=== Season 1 (2003) ===
| No. overall | No. in season | Title | Case | Original release date |
|---|---|---|---|---|
| 1 | 1 | Nature's Clues | Various | January 9, 2003 |
How do bugs, pigs and even the weather help investigators solve crimes? From tropical Hawaii to the frigid waters of Lake Ontario, forensic experts reveal the clues nature leaves behind on a human corpse.
| 2 | 2 | The Profilers | Various | January 23, 2003 |
The bizarre behavior of a killer is as specific as a signature. Crime fighters map the psychological and physical terrain of murderers, for example Paul Bernardo or Jon Venables.
| 3 | 3 | Lasting Impressions | Various | January 30, 2003 |
How can the slightest impressions tips help crime fighters find their offender, like Allan Legere or Ted Bundy.
| 4 | 4 | Murder Weapons | Various | November 14, 2003 |
Advanced technology is used to investigate explosive residue, ballistics and trauma wounds, to reveal the weapons and the criminals who used them.
| 5 | 5 | The Cover Up | Various | November 21, 2003 |
Even as a body burned to ashes, sunk deep into the sea or reduced to fragments will still tell its forensic tale. Such as the case of Sun Gym gang or in the murder of Anadeli Macedo-Moreno.
| 6 | 6 | Future Crime | Various | November 28, 2003 |
Forensic experts describe their use of hi-tech tools to solve crimes. From lie-detectors to computers which can allegedly isolate a guilty face in a crowd.

=== Season 2 (2004) ===
| No. overall | No. in season | Title | Case | Original release date |
|---|---|---|---|---|
| 7 | 1 | Forensics on Trial | Murder of Andrea Atkinson | November 12, 2004 |
A six-year old girl is found dead in the boiler room of her Toronto tenement. Scientific tests determine that the sound in the boiler room suppressed her voice as she was suffocated. Whoever killed her knew no one would hear him.
| 8 | 2 | Bloody Valentine | Murder of Susan Hamilton | November 19, 2004 |
Oklahoma City detectives finds a woman lying naked in a pool of blood. The evidence suggests a crime of both heated rage and cold calculation.
| 9 | 3 | A Deadly Affair | Murder of Selina Shen | November 26, 2004 |
An international manhunt ensues involving seven police forces and four countries after five body parts are found on a highway.
| 10 | 4 | Killing Spree | Danny Rolling | December 3, 2004 |
Five university students are brutally attacked and killed in Gainesville, Florida. Authorities are dedicated to catch the perpetrator. Note: The episode features interview with Rolling himself.
| 11 | 5 | Beauty Queen | Murder of Karyn Hearn Slover | December 10, 2004 |
A small-town dreamer finally got her big break. She's been offered work as a model by an agency. She leaves her desk at the local newspaper in Decatur, Illinois and is never heard from again.
| 12 | 6 | No Body, No Crime | Murder of Frank Black | December 17, 2004 |
A millionaire boards a commercial flight in New York City and disappears into thin air. Authorities believe his former business associate is the man behind the disappearance.

=== Season 3 (2005) ===
| No. overall | No. in season | Title | Case | Original release date |
|---|---|---|---|---|
| 13 | 1 | Fremont Bomber | Rodney Blach | July 11, 2005 |
A series of bombs rocks Fremont, California. The targets include both the Chief and Ex-Chief of police. Can police and forensic scientists stop the bomber before he strikes again?
| 14 | 2 | Vanished | Murder of Thomas Ku | July 18, 2005 |
The owner of a private school is kidnapped from his driveway. Investigators race against time, since he is a diabetic man who desperately in need of his medication.
| 15 | 3 | Betrayed | Murders of Hyo Jung Jin and Hea Song | September 9, 2005 |
The discovery of an Asian woman's body in an abandoned suitcase leads North Yorkshire police to London. But instead of answers, the mystery only deepens when they discover that a second woman is missing.
| 16 | 4 | Summer of Hate | Murders of Gary Matson and Winfield Mowder | September 15, 2005 |
The murder of a gay couple in Redding, California has police stymied. As investigators dig deeper, they suspect that the case is linked to a series of arsons that have destroyed several synagogues and an abortion clinic. The trail leads them to the sinister world of hate crimes.
| 17 | 5 | Promised Land | Murder of Lyudmyla Petushenko | September 30, 2005 |
When a Russian sex-worker is found murdered, Los Angeles homicide detectives quickly find the case to be anything but routine.
| 18 | 6 | Rampage | Eric Ross | October 14, 2005 |
Four brutal murders in one bloody weekend devastate the town of Barrie. Forensic scientists find themselves in a desperate race to find those responsible.

=== Season 4 (2007) ===
| No. overall | No. in season | Title | Case | Original release date |
|---|---|---|---|---|
| 19 | 1 | Hog Trail Murders | Daniel Conahan | May 4, 2007 |
In Central Florida multiple bodies of men are found in wooded areas. Police realize they are chasing a serial killer, but the investigation is hampered by the fact that they are unable to identify the victims.
| 20 | 2 | Yosemite Park Murders | Cary Stayner | May 11, 2007 |
Carole Sund, her daughter Juli and friend Silvina Pelosso go missing while vacationing in Yosemite National Park. What begins as a search and rescue operation becomes a chilling case of murder.
| 21 | 3 | House Hermit | Murder of Ian and Nancy Blackburn | May 18, 2007 |
An elderly couple is found dead in the trunk of their car at their home. The investigation eventually leads to the couple's vacation home an hour north of the city.
| 22 | 4 | Sniper | John Muhammad, Lee Boyd Malvo | May 25, 2007 |
For 23 days a sniper terrorizes the Washington, D.C. area. Authorities struggle to find a clue until they discover a single fingerprint, which leads to not one, but two killers.
| 23 | 5 | Dead Man's Hollow | Murder of Hovhannes Amirian | June 1, 2007 |
A retired fireman on a morning bike ride notices a burning bundle in a farmer's field in Norfolk. Investigators recognizes the smell of burning human flesh.
| 24 | 6 | Olympic Bomber | Eric Rudolph | June 1, 2007 |
The 1996 Summer Olympics in Atlanta are rocked by a massive pipe bomb explosion. Two person are killed and hundreds injured. Subsequent bombs at an abortion clinic and a gay bar show a similar M.O.

=== Season 5 (2008–09) ===
| No. overall | No. in season | Title | Case | Original release date |
|---|---|---|---|---|
| 25 | 1 | The Colchester Rapist | Dayle Grayer | August 1, 2008 |
A serial rapist reign of terror that spans more than eighteen years. He stalks and preys on elderly women living in Colchester, Ontario. Only a revolution in forensic science can catch the elusive attacker.
| 26 | 2 | Atomic Dog | James Charles Kopp | August 8, 2008 |
A sniper targets abortion doctors creating a wide-city panic. After every attack the self-appointed angel of death disappears into the shadowy underground.
| 27 | 3 | The Eclectic Murders | Robert Fry | August 15, 2008 |
In the 1990s a string of vicious homicides rocked Farmington, New Mexico. Police have no idea that the perpetrator hides within a group of Goth youths.
| 28 | 4 | Smiley Face Killer | Robert Lee Yates | August 22, 2008 |
The working-girls of Spokane, Washington are targeted by a cruel serial killer. On each victim's head, police find his macabre calling card – a plastic bag emblazoned with an ironic Smiley Face.
| 29 | 5 | Forsaken | Murder of Yvette Budram | August 29, 2008 |
On the outskirts of Hamilton, Ontario a jogger makes a gruesome discovery – the partially mummified remains of a human body. Authorities must use special art forensics to be able to identify the victim.
| 30 | 6 | The Fifth Commandment | Ryan Erickson | March 27, 2009 |
Two undertakers are shot and killed while at work at a funeral home in Hudson, Wisconsin. With the help of Richard Walter the local police are determined to solve the Agatha Christie-like mystery.
| 31 | 7 | Knock Knock You're Dead | Derrick Todd Lee | April 3, 2009 |
In the early 2000s Baton Rouge, Louisiana is held in the terrifying grip of a serial killer. The number of victims is growing whose "low risk" lifestyle should have never put them on the radar of a killer.
| 32 | 8 | Pyromaniac | John Leonard Orr | April 10, 2009 |
A series fires rips through San Joaquin Valley, killing four people and devastating the landscape. An extensive investigation by the ATF, local police and forensic scientists reveals a common pattern among all the blazes. To their horror the serial offender is no stranger to them.
| 33 | 9 | Leaving Las Vegas | Margaret Rudin | April 17, 2009 |
Las Vegas homicide detectives discover the charred remains of a prominent business man. Investigators are thrust into a dangerous world of high stakes deception fueled by passion, greed and revenge.
| 34 | 10 | Greetings from Yahweh | Phineas Priesthood | April 24, 2009 |
A series of bombings and bank robberies leaves a usually serene city reeling. The crimes are committed the most radical and dangerous white supremacist movement.
| 35 | 11 | Picture Perfect | Nelson Serrano | May 1, 2009 |
In small-town Bartow, Florida four bodies are found murdered in a factory. When investigators finally zero in on a prime suspect, they are foiled by his picture-perfect alibi.
| 36 | 12 | Bike Path Rapist | Altemio Sanchez | May 8, 2009 |
The bike paths in a suburb of Buffalo, New York is taken by an evil man. The series of sexual assaults eventually escalates into murder. After decades, DNA evidence finally reveal the serial killer identity.

=== Season 6 (2010) ===
| No. overall | No. in season | Title | Case | Original release date |
|---|---|---|---|---|
| 37 | 1 | Million Dollar Murder | Murder of Charles Clinton White | July 9, 2010 |
Police discover a millionaire brutally slain in his Horseshoe Bay, Texas mansion. Investigators are forced to navigate through a wide circle of friends – that includes rich CEOs, celebrity athletes, movie stars.
| 38 | 2 | Shopping Spree Killer | Dana Sue Gray | July 16, 2010 |
Multiple elderly woman are murdered in their home of the upscale gated community of Canyon Lake, California. Police fear there's a psychopathic serial killer on the loose.
| 39 | 3 | Thrill Kill | Dale Hausner and Samuel Dieteman | July 23, 2010 |
The city of Phoenix, Arizona is shocked by a series of drive-by shooting that targets anybody. Detectives race against time to stop a team of killers.
| 40 | 4 | Jack | William Charles Lewis | July 30, 2010 |
In march 2001 multiple people had been shot in East Point, Georgia. At all scenes a piece of paper had been left with "Jack" written with a highlighter.
| 41 | 5 | The Abbotsford Killer | Terry Driver | August 6, 2010 |
Someone brutally attacks two teenager girls in Abbotsford, British Columbia, killing one of them. A Special Task Force is created when the killer leaves taunting messages about the horrendous crime.
| 42 | 6 | Love Bites | Murder of Devon Guzman | August 13, 2010 |
A vivacious teenage girl is found brutally stabbed to death in her car in Easton, Pennsylvania. The suspects' stories overlap and raise more questions than they answer.

== Forensic Factor: A New Era ==
In 2023, Discovery Channel rebooted the series. The first season aired with 6 episodes.

=== Season 1 (2023) ===
| No. overall | No. in season | Title | Case | Original release date |
|---|---|---|---|---|
| 1 | 1 | The Windshield Cracked From Side to Side | Murder of Barbara Kendhammer | November 17, 2023 |
In West Salem, Wisconsin, Todd Kendhammer claims his wife was killed in a car accident. However, the forensic evidence doesn't back him up. When a new defense team, known for working on the Steven Avery case is hired, they bring in their own forensic experts to contradict the state's case.
| 2 | 2 | The Red Flags of Murder | Murder of Leslie Neulander | November 24, 2023 |
In DeWitt, New York, Leslie Neulander's death is declared accidental, forensic investigators sound the alarm that this was no accident. A close look at the 911 call, a new analysis of the autopsy report, and blood where there shouldn't be all help catch the unlikely killer.
| 3 | 3 | Suitcase Of Secrets | Murder of Jamie Haggard | December 1, 2023 |
A suitcase filled with unidentified human remains unlocks a missing person's case. Jamie Haggard disappearance in Kenmore, Washington went unsolved for two years. The forensic analysis of a nearly-destroyed cellphone found in the suitcase reveals a mysterious photo which reveals the culprit behind the murder.
| 4 | 4 | The Cops, The Fugitive, The Nurse, And Her Lover | Murder of Lanell Barsock | December 8, 2023 |
When Lanell Barsock is found murdered in Palmdale, California, it seems obvious to all that her boyfriend did it. When the forensic evidence comes in, investigators are astonished to learn they've arrested the wrong person. If he is innocent, who's the killer?
| 5 | 5 | A Rifle Doesn't Lie | Murders of Nichole Payne and Austin Taylor Wages | December 15, 2023 |
Homicide investigators in Quitman, Texas are convinced an apparent murder-suicide was staged but the experienced CSI on the scene disagrees. Only the gut instincts of the cops, coupled with an outside forensic expert's opinion, convince authorities who the real killer is.
| 6 | 6 | Hair of the Dog | Murder of Misty April Morse | December 22, 2023 |
When the body of a woman is found floating in a river in Merritt Island, Florida, police find it near impossible to identify her. With only a piece of nautical rope, a strip of duct tape with a strange hair on it, and some plastic bags to go on, they use every forensic tool they have to catch her killer.

=== Season 2 (2025) ===
| No. overall | No. in season | Title | Case | Original release date |
|---|---|---|---|---|
| 7 | 1 | Tangled Identities | Murder of Joleen Cummings | January 12, 2025 |
Mother of three goes missing in Fernandina Beach, Florida the day before her birthday. There is no shortage of suspects, till forensic analyst and CCTV footage point to one unlikely person of interest.
| 8 | 2 | Killer Evidence | Murder of Mavis Kindness Nelson | January 20, 2025 |
A horrific crime scene in the heart of Seattle leaves forensic investigators little clues to determine who is responsible.
| 9 | 3 | The Impossible Solution | Death of Delvonte Tisdale | January 27, 2025 |
An unidentified teenage boy is found dead in a Milton, Massachusetts suburban street. They can’t determine the cause of death, until the case takes an unexpected turn.
| 10 | 4 | Playing With Fire | Insurance fraud | February 3, 2025 |
The badly burnt human remains recovered in a blazing car fire suggest Clayton Daniels died in a horrible road accident near Burnet, Texas. However, forensic evidence shows irregularities about that theory.
| 11 | 5 | Deadly Foreclosure | Murder of Heidi Firkus | February 9, 2025 |
When a couple is gunned down in her Saint Paul, Minnesota house, a decade old search for the truth began. With two possible stories and conflicting evidence, investigators had to prove what not happened.
| 12 | 6 | The Look In Her Eyes | Murder of Jason Hamrick | February 9, 2025 |
A body in a ditch near Bethel, Ohio is at the end of a forensic trail that begins at the home of a missing father. However, there are no signs of where the crime was committed.

=== Season 3 (2026) ===
| No. overall | No. in season | Title | Case | Original release date |
|---|---|---|---|---|
| 13 | 1 | Southern Sins | Trial of Alex Murdaugh | April 5, 2026 |
When two members of the powerful family are murdered, law enforcement is faced with a town swirling with gossip, grudges and lies. They turn to digital forensics to find evidence.
| 14 | 2 | Witness To Evil | Murder of Esperanza Wells and Margarita Ruiz | April 12, 2026 |
Two women are brutally murdered in Bushnell, Florida while two small children watch and hide. The case goes unsolved for years until investigators matches another killing in Chippewa Falls, Wisconsin.
| 15 | 3 | Preaching Evil | A.B. Schirmer | April 19, 2026 |
Joseph Musante is found dead inside a respected pastor's office of Reeders, Pennsylvania. As forensic clues mount, a web of lies unravels, exposing a dark history of violence tied.
| 16 | 4 | A Novel Murder | Murder of Daniel Brophy | April 26, 2026 |
A culinary instructor is found dead on his kitchen classroom floor. Investigators must rewrite the script as they examine the evidence leading to a calculated killer.
| 17 | 5 | Death In The Desert | Murder of Nancy Woodrum | May 3, 2026 |
A Paso Robles, California resident vanishes in the dead of night, leaving only a smeared bloody hand-print behind. With no body and multiple suspects, investigators turn to new and unproven forensic tech to retrace her last moments.
| 18 | 6 | The Telltale Casing | Murder of Timothy Sypher | May 10, 2026 |
A case of road rage ends in homicide. Tenacious San Antonio investigators pin their hopes on a tiny, damaged bullet.
