= Jacqueline Cambas =

American film editor

Jacqueline C. Cambas (born in New York City) is an American film editor.

== Life ==
Jacqueline Cambas was born in New York City. From 1972 until 1976 she studied education and psychology at the University of California, Los Angeles. Cambas was working as a teacher before she started to work in the film industry.

Since the mid-1970s Cambas was active as a film editor. In the beginning she was assistant editor for Tom Rolf, with whom she worked on films such as Hardcore, The Great Outdoors or Black Rain. Soon she started to work on her own. Since Racing with the Moon (1984) she often worked with director Richard Benjamin on films such as City Heat, The Money Pit, Little Nikita, My Stepmother Is an Alien, Downtown, Mermaids, Made in America, Milk Money, Mrs. Winterbourne, The Shrink Is In or Marci X.

Cambas is a member of American Cinema Editors (ACE), where she is a life member in the Board of Directors since 2017.

== Selected filmography ==
Editor
| Year | Film | Director | Notes |
|---|---|---|---|
| 1980 | The Gong Show Movie | Chuck Barris | |
| 1980 | Falling in Love Again | Steven Paul | |
| 1981 | Zoot Suit | Luis Valdez | |
| 1982 | Personal Best | Robert Towne | |
| 1982 | Cat People | Paul Schrader | Second collaboration with Paul Schrader |
| 1983 | Surf II | Randall M. Badat | |
| 1984 | Racing with the Moon | Richard Benjamin | First collaboration with Richard Benjamin |
| 1984 | City Heat | Richard Benjamin | Second collaboration with Richard Benjamin |
| 1986 | The Money Pit | Richard Benjamin | Third collaboration with Richard Benjamin |
| 1987 | Light of Day | Paul Schrader | Third collaboration with Paul Schrader |
| 1988 | Little Nikita | Richard Benjamin | Fourth collaboration with Richard Benjamin |
| 1988 | My Stepmother Is an Alien | Richard Benjamin | Fifth collaboration with Richard Benjamin |
| 1990 | Downtown | Richard Benjamin | Sixth collaboration with Richard Benjamin |
| 1990 | Mermaids | Richard Benjamin | Seventh collaboration with Richard Benjamin |
| 1991 | Frankie & Johnny | Garry Marshall | |
| 1992 | School Ties | Robert Mandel | |
| 1993 | Made in America | Richard Benjamin | Eighth collaboration with Richard Benjamin |
| 1994 | Milk Money | Richard Benjamin | Ninth collaboration with Richard Benjamin |
| 1995 | Now and Then | Lesli Linka Glatter | First collaboration with Lesli Linka Glatter |
| 1996 | Mrs. Winterbourne | Richard Benjamin | Tenth collaboration with Richard Benjamin |
| 1998 | The Proposition | Lesli Linka Glatter | Second collaboration with Lesli Linka Glatter |
| 1999 | The Love Letter | Peter Chan | |
| 2001 | The Shrink Is In | Richard Benjamin | Eleventh collaboration with Richard Benjamin |
| 2001 | Freddy Got Fingered | Tom Green | |
| 2003 | Marci X | Richard Benjamin | Twelfth collaboration with Richard Benjamin |
| 2006 | Relative Strangers | Greg Glienna | |
| 2006 | The Butterfly Effect 2 | John R. Leonetti | Direct-to-video |
| 2007 | The Trouble with Romance | Gene Rhee | |
| 2010 | Rollers | Romeo Antonio | |
| 2022 | Ten Tricks | Richard Pagano | |

Editorial department
| Year | Film | Director | Role | Notes |
|---|---|---|---|---|
| 1974 | The Trial of Billy Jack | Tom Laughlin | Post-production coordinator | |
| 1979 | Hardcore | Paul Schrader | Assistant film editor | First collaboration with Paul Schrader |
| 1988 | The Great Outdoors | Howard Deutch | Additional editor | |
| 1989 | Black Rain | Ridley Scott | Additional editor | |

Additional crew
| Year | Film | Director | Role | Notes |
|---|---|---|---|---|
| 1974 | I Love You, I Love You Not | James Bryan | Production assistant | |
| 2006 | The Butterfly Effect 2 | John R. Leonetti | Title sequence designer | Direct-to-video |

Actress
| Year | Film | Director | Role | Notes |
|---|---|---|---|---|
| 1977 | Boogievision | James Bryan | Feminist Car Pooler | Uncredited |

Production manager
| Year | Film | Director | Role |
|---|---|---|---|
| 1977 | Billy Jack Goes to Washington | Tom Laughlin | Post-production supervisor |

TV movies

Editor
| Year | Film | Director |
|---|---|---|
| 1978 | A Christmas to Remember | George Englund |
| 1998 | The Pentagon Wars | Richard Benjamin |
| 1998 | Tourist Trap | Richard Benjamin |
| 2001 | The Sports Pages | Richard Benjamin |
| 2001 | Laughter on the 23rd Floor | Richard Benjamin |
| 2004 | The Goodbye Girl | Richard Benjamin |
| 2006 | For the Love of a Child | Douglas Barr |
| 2006 | A Little Thing Called Murder | Richard Benjamin |
| 2013 | Killer Beauty | Jason Sklaver |

TV series

Editor
| Year | Title | Notes |
|---|---|---|
| 2006 | Masters of Horror | 1 episode |
| 2006−08 | Men in Trees | 16 episodes |
| 2008 | Life | 3 episodes |
| 2009 | WWII in HD | 10 episodes |
| 2010 | Pretty Little Liars | 1 episode |
| 2011 | Vietnam in HD | 4 episodes |

TV shorts

Editor
| Year | Film | Director |
|---|---|---|
| 2010 | Kick It Up L.A.! | Kamala Lopez; Jessica O'Keefe |
