= Walls of Glass (film) =

- Directed by: Scott D. Goldstein
- Written by: Edmund Collins (screenwriter); Scott D. Goldstein
- Produced by: Scott D. Goldstein; Mark Slater
- Starring: Philip Bosco; Geraldine Page; William Hickey; Olympia Dukakis; Brian Bloom; Steven Weber; Linda Thorson
- Cinematography: Ivan Strasburg
- Edited by: Scott Vickrey
- Music by: Scott D. Goldstein
- Distributed by: United Film Distribution Company (UFDC)
- Release dates: October 30, 1985 (U.S.); January 14, 1987 (France); July 6, 1988 (Germany)
- Running time: 86 min.
- Country: United States
- Language: English

Walls of Glass, also known as Flanagan, is a 1985 American romantic comedy film directed by Scott D. Goldstein and starring Philip Bosco as the protagonist James Flanagan. The film was released on October 30, 1985.

== Premise ==
Aging New York cabbie James Flanagan (Philip Bosco) still hopes to succeed in becoming a stage actor.

== Cast ==
- Philip Bosco - James Flanagan
- Geraldine Page - Mama
- Linda Thorson - Andrea
- Olympia Dukakis - Mary Flanagan
- Brian Bloom - Danny Flanagan
- Steven Weber - Sean
- Louis Zorich - Lerner
- James Tolkan - Turner
- William Hickey - Papa (as Bill Hickey)
- Pierre Epstein - Miery
- Jered Holmes - Dallavanti
- F.R. Davies - Dr. Coleman
- Cory Notrica (as Cary Notrica) - Gordon
- Theron Montgomery - Pickles
- Ronald Yamamoto - Sushi
- Don Brockett - Van Driver
- Lynne Thigpen - Woman Cop
- Edmond Collins - TV Preacher/Radio Voice
- Holly Marie Combs - Abby Hall
