= A Little Thing Called Murder =

- Written by: Teena Booth; Randy Stone
- Directed by: Richard Benjamin
- Starring: Judy Davis; Jonathan Jackson; Chelcie Ross; Cynthia Stevenson
- Theme music composer: John Frizzell
- Original language: English

Production
- Producer: Fran Rosati
- Cinematography: Robert McLachlan
- Editor: Jacqueline Cambas
- Running time: 90 minutes

Original release
- Network: Lifetime
- Release: January 23, 2006

A Little Thing Called Murder is a 2006 comedy-drama television film starring Judy Davis and Jonathan Jackson and directed by Richard Benjamin.

Made by Stonemade Entertainment for Lifetime TV, the film was based on a true story of convicted murderer Santé Kimes, as told in the book Dead End by reporter Jeanne King. A 2001 made-for-TV film about Kimes titled Like Mother, Like Son starred Emmy winners Mary Tyler Moore as Santé and Jean Stapleton as Irene Silverman.

== Synopsis ==
Sante Kimes is a con artist and thief who has been preparing her son Kenny since childhood to be her accomplice. Sante is living with a rich man, Ken Kimes, who is unwilling to marry her and makes no provision for Kenny in his will. The boy's mother becomes involved in robberies, arson and the murder of an elderly woman to enrich herself, with her son as her partner in crime.

== Cast ==
- Judy Davis as Santé Kimes
- Jonathan Jackson as Kenny Kimes
- Chelcie Ross as Ken Kimes Sr.
- Cynthia Stevenson as Beverly Bates
- Ryan Robbins as Shawn Little
- Alexander Ludwig as Young Kenny Kimes

== Awards and nominations ==
The film won Best Motion Picture Made for Television in the 11th Golden Satellite Awards.

Judy Davis won Best Actress in a Miniseries or a Motion Picture Made for Television in the 11th Golden Satellite Awards. Davis was also nominated for Outstanding Lead Actress in a Miniseries or a Movie in the Emmy Awards.

The casting team was nominated for Best Movie of the Week Casting by the Casting Society of America in its 2006 Artios Awards.
