= Milk Money (film) =

- Promotional release poster
- Directed by: Richard Benjamin
- Written by: John Mattson
- Produced by: Kathleen Kennedy; Frank Marshall
- Starring: Melanie Griffith; Ed Harris
- Cinematography: David Watkin
- Edited by: Jacqueline Cambas
- Music by: Michael Convertino
- Production company: The Kennedy/Marshall Company
- Distributed by: Paramount Pictures
- Release date: August 31, 1994
- Running time: 110 minutes
- Country: United States
- Language: English
- Box office: $18 million

Milk Money is a 1994 American romantic comedy film directed by Richard Benjamin, and starring Melanie Griffith and Ed Harris. It follows three suburban 11-year-old boys who find themselves behind in "the battle of the sexes". One of them helps his father get into a relationship with a female prostitute.

The film premiered on August 31, 1994. It received generally negative reviews from critics while grossing $18 million.

== Plot ==
Three boys – Brad, Frank Wheeler, and Kevin – travel from the fictional bedroom suburb of Middleton to Pittsburgh, bringing money with hopes of seeing a naked woman. They find a prostitute named V who is willing to show her breasts. However, when they decide to head home, they find their bikes have been stolen, leaving them broke and stuck in the city. V speaks with her drug-dealing pimp named Cash and another prostitute, Betty. Cash has been skimming money that he sends to mob collector Waltzer, who in turn steals from his boss Jerry "The Pope". V notices the boys outside in the rain and offers them a ride back home in Cash's car.

After they arrive at Frank's house, the car V was using suddenly breaks down, so she goes inside to use the phone. Tom, Frank's father, comes home, and he is surprised to find a woman in the house. Unknown to V, Frank tells Tom that V is a math tutor to Brad. Tom offers to repair her car in a few days when he is free from his science classes at school. With no other option, she accepts Frank's offer to stay in his tree house without Tom's knowledge. Frank begins a close friendship with V, hoping to set her up with his father. He tells her Tom has no problem with her "job", meaning the tutoring ruse, but she thinks he means her prostitution.

V learns from television that Cash has been murdered by Waltzer. She phones Betty, only to discover that Waltzer is looking for her – Cash lied and told him that she stole the money that Cash was stealing from Waltzer. She realizes that he is overhearing the conversation and hangs up. With V's car still broken down, she gets Tom's old bike from the garage and rushes to find him. He is on a field trip to the town's wetlands, land that he is attempting to save from development. He is unable to repair her car any sooner, but she realizes that she is probably safer in Middleton because Waltzer doesn't know where she is.

At school, Frank flunks a biology test about sex education and must give his class an oral presentation. He decides to use V as a mannequin, and through a ruse, distracts his teacher long enough to draw a relatively accurate female reproductive system on her skin-colored bodysuit. Tom and V go on a date, and both realize they are developing feelings for each other. While walking through town on their date, Tom and V run into Kevin's family. V recognizes Kevin's father, who is a client, but he initially says that she has him mixed up with someone else before admitting to remembering her and says that she was a dance teacher. Tom is impressed with how busy V is being a tutor and dance teacher; V then realizes that Frank had lied about Tom knowing about her prostitution. V explains herself to Tom, and their relationship grows. She reveals that her real name is Eve, which she thought was too biblical, so she removed the Es. Kevin's father unwittingly calls her home phone number, which he had in his pocket notebook, in an attempt to purchase her services again. He talks to Betty, and Waltzer, who happens to be there also, learns from Betty about the trip to Middleton, thus finding out where V is hiding.

V is terrified that Waltzer will find her, so she decides to leave town, but attends a school dance to say goodbye to Frank. Waltzer arrives and whilst at the dance both Waltzer and V realize that the stolen money is physically in Cash's car, and a chase ensues, ending in Cash's car blowing up, with Waltzer finally giving up on chasing them as he believes the stolen money has blown up with the car. Anxious about her status and afraid to return to her old job, V goes to Waltzer's boss and relates how he has been cheating him. She asks to be "forgotten" by them. The older crime boss tells her that he'll take care of things and allows her to walk away from prostitution for good. V finds the stolen money in a backpack and uses it to buy the wetlands in Tom's name; it is also revealed that she purchased the ice-cream parlor in town, so she can carry on with her new relationship.

== Cast ==
- Melanie Griffith as Eve "V"
- Ed Harris as Tom Wheeler
- Michael Patrick Carter as Frank Wheeler
- Malcolm McDowell as Waltzer
- Anne Heche as Betty
- Philip Bosco as Jerry "The Pope"
- Casey Siemaszko as "Cash"
- Brian Christopher as Kevin
- Adam LaVorgna as Brad
- Margaret Nagle as Mrs. Fetch

== Production ==
The screenplay written by John Mattson was sold to Paramount Pictures in 1992 for $1.1 million, a record for a romantic comedy spec script. Mattson was sued by Dino De Laurentiis (DDLC); the lawsuit alleged that Mattson's agent had made a verbal agreement to sell the script to DDLC for $1 million, before selling the script to Paramount for $1.1 million. Part of the motivation for Paramount's acquisition of Milk Money was when Sherry Lansing was inducted as studio Chairman to replace Brandon Tartikoff, Tarktikoff had left absolutely no movies in the pipeline and only general commitments to sequels such as Star Trek and Beverly Hills Cop but without any scripts or in some cases no director commitments. One of Lansing's first actions within days of assuming her position as the studio head was to acquire Milk Money.

Joe Dante was set to direct with his frequent partner Michael Finnell as producer, but they left the project over disputes regarding the budget and their fees. Paramount had wanted Dante to work for less than his normal directing fee and to shoot the film in Canada using a non-union crew with a budget of $14 million.

Shot in various locations in Pittsburgh, Cincinnati and Lebanon, Ohio, the story is set in a Pennsylvania suburb named "Middleton," outside an unnamed city (for which parts of Pittsburgh and Cincinnati were used).

== Release ==
The film was theatrically released on August 31, 1994. A home video release followed on March 7, 1995.

== Reception ==
On Rotten Tomatoes, the film has an approval rating of 12%, based on reviews from 42 critics, with an average rating of 3.5/10. The consensus reads: "Ill-conceived and cheap when it comes to cleverness, Milk Money is a more than a few cents short of a good time." Audiences polled by CinemaScore gave the film a grade "B" on scale of A to F.

Gene Siskel & Roger Ebert speculated that it may have been made by Hollywood executives with an affinity for prostitutes. In print, Roger Ebert opted not for a conventional negative review, but to portray it as the result of a fictional conversation between two studio executives. Janet Maslin of The New York Times gave it a negative review and suggested "Milk Money may be the first brainless American comedy that deserves to be remade by the French." Maslin said Melanie Griffith "brings a certain irrepressible gusto to her role" and Ed Harris "manages to be improbably charming." Variety called it "a misguided comedy with Hall of Shame pedigree" and "The film is obvious, loud, mean-spirited and has its mind in the gutter."

The film opened just before the Labor Day weekend and its gross of $5.8 million over the 4-day weekend was the highest for a film opening over the Labor Day weekend but was only enough to finish fifth at the US box office. It grossed $18,121,466 in the United States and Canada.

At the 15th Golden Raspberry Awards, the film was nominated for Worst Screenplay, but it lost to The Flintstones.

=== Year-end worst-of lists ===
- 2nd – Glenn Lovell, San Jose Mercury News
- 4th – Dan Craft, The Pantagraph
- 6th – Janet Maslin, The New York Times
- 9th – Robert Denerstein, Rocky Mountain News
- Top 10 (not ranked) – Betsy Pickle, Knoxville News-Sentinel
- Worst (not ranked) – Bob Ross, The Tampa Tribune

== Home media ==
The film was released on VHS in March 1995 and DVD on September 9, 2003. It was presented in anamorphic widescreen in its original 1.85:1 aspect ratio.
