= Diabolical Women =

- Genre: True crime
- Country of origin: United States
- Original language: English
- No. of seasons: 1
- No. of episodes: 3

Production
- Running time: 42 minutes

Original release
- Network: Lifetime Movie Network
- Release: March 18 – April 1, 2015

Diabolical Women is an American crime documentary television series which focuses on women who have committed crimes. It is produced by LMNO Entertainment Group.

== Broadcast ==
The three part series premiered in the U.S. on Lifetime Movie Network (LMN) on March 18, 2015 and concluded on April 1 in the same year.

Internationally, it premiered in Australia on the CI Network on August 18, 2015.

== Episodes ==
No.	Title	Original release date	U.S. viewers (millions)
1	"Sante Kimes"	March 18, 2015	379,000
The story of Sante Kimes, the glamorous wife of a California millionaire, who brainwashed her son into becoming her partner in crime, including murder.
2	"Tracey Richter"	March 25, 2015	N/A
The story of Tracey Richter, a seemingly heroic mother who took revenge on her ex-husband by devising a murderous plot and implicating him as the fall guy.
3	"Dana Sue Gray"	April 1, 2015	372,000
The story of Dana Sue Gray, a blonde nurse who took her adrenaline addiction to a new high when she went on a lavish shopping and killing spree.
