= The Goodbye Girl (2004 film) =

2004 television film by Richard Benjamin

- Genre: Romantic comedy
- Based on: The Goodbye Girl by Neil Simon
- Written by: Neil Simon
- Directed by: Richard Benjamin
- Starring: Jeff Daniels; Patricia Heaton; Hallie Kate Eisenberg; Alan Cumming
- Music by: John Frizzell
- Country of origin: United States
- Original language: English

Production
- Executive producers: Ron Ziskin; Dave Collins; Neil Simon
- Producers: Timothy Marx; Richard Benjamin
- Cinematography: Danny Nowak
- Editor: Jacqueline Cambas
- Running time: 103 minutes
- Production companies: Warner Bros. Television; Turner Entertainment Co.; Ron Ziskin Productions

Original release
- Network: TNT
- Release: January 16, 2004

The Goodbye Girl is a 2004 American romantic comedy television film directed by Richard Benjamin and written by Neil Simon, based on Simon's screenplay to the 1977 film. It stars Jeff Daniels and Patricia Heaton. It aired on TNT on January 16, 2004. Like the original film, it follows an actor who lives in an apartment along with his friend's ex-girlfriend, whom the friend has just abandoned, and her preteen daughter.

== Cast ==
- Jeff Daniels as Elliot Garfield
- Patricia Heaton as Paula McFadden
- Hallie Kate Eisenberg as Lucy McFadden
- Lynda Boyd as Donna Douglas
- Alan Cumming as Mark
- Richard Benjamin as Oliver Fry
- Sharon Wilkins as Mrs. Crosby
- Marco Soriano as Ronnie Burns
- Woody Jeffreys as Eddie
- Emily Holmes as Rhonda
- Ron Halder as Lovell
- Ross Benjamin as Catesby
- Marie Stillin as Mark's Mother
- Kevin Durand as Earl
- Zag Margaret as Gretchen
