= Dana Sue Gray =

American serial killer (born 1957)

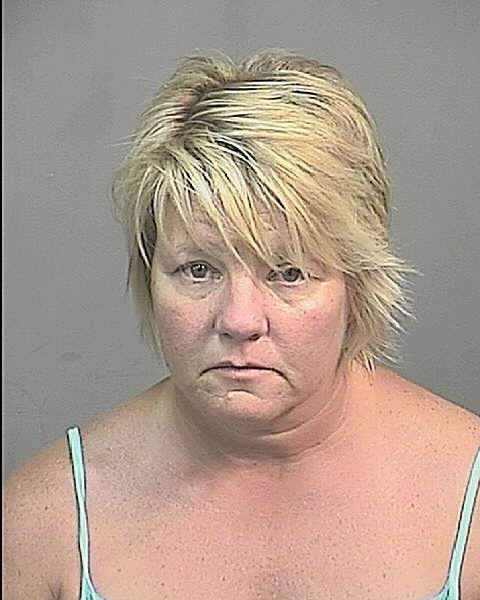
- Born: Dana Sue Armbrust; December 6, 1957 (age 68); Newport Beach, California, U.S.
- Occupation: Former nurse
- Spouse: Tom Gray (m. 1987; div. 1993)
- Convictions: Murder; Attempted murder; Robbery
- Penalty: Life without parole

Details
- Victims: June Roberts and Dora Beebe (murder and robbery); Norma Davis (suspected of murder but not charged); Dorinda Hawkins (attempted murder and robbery)
- Span of crimes: February 16 – March 16, 1994
- Country: United States
- State: California
- Date apprehended: March 16, 1994; 32 years ago

Dana Sue Gray (born December 6, 1957) is an American serial killer who murdered three elderly women in 1994. She was caught after a fourth intended victim survived and identified her. Gray claims to have committed the murders to support her spending habits. She is serving a sentence of life, without the possibility of parole, in the California Women's Prison in Chowchilla.

== Early life ==
Gray was born Dana Sue Armbrust on December 6, 1957, in California to Beverly (née Arnett) and Russell Armbrust. Her father had worked as a hairdresser and had three previous marriages before marrying Beverly Arnett, a former beauty queen who had been an MGM starlet. They had several miscarriages before Dana was born. Beverly was described as an aggressive, vain woman. They divorced when Dana was two years old. Afterward, she rarely saw her father. She began acting out to get attention. Whenever Beverly would discipline her, Dana would retaliate by stealing money to buy candy and would occasionally fly into fits of violence. She did not get along well with other students and did poorly in all her classes. She was often suspended from school for forging notes to get out of class.

When Dana was 14, Beverly developed breast cancer; Gray decided to become a nurse after watching hospital nurses treat her mother. After her mother died in 1975, Gray moved in with her father but was forced to leave after her stepmother found drugs in her room. A few years later, she became involved with a skydiving instructor, who got her pregnant twice; he convinced her to terminate both pregnancies, something she resented. She later suffered several miscarriages, which led her to depression and psychotropic medications. She was fired from her nursing job after she was caught stealing drugs.

== Personal life ==
Dana graduated from Newport Harbor High School in 1976. For the next several years, she lived with her skydiving instructor, Rob, who helped her with nursing school. She became an expert skydiver. In 1981, she graduated from nursing school and, for the next few years, had an on-again, off-again relationship with Chris Dodson, a windsurfer. Dana excelled in windsurfing and golf, and they took trips to Hawaii to participate in these activities.

In October 1987, Dana married Tom Gray at an upscale winery in the Temecula area. He was a fellow sports enthusiast who had known and admired her since high school. Not long after their marriage, Dana incurred a large amount of debt. At this time, she did not have much contact with her family due to a dispute over an aunt's will. She was a labor and delivery nurse at Inland Valley Regional Medical Center. They lived in the gated community of Canyon Lake, where they had several business ventures named Graymatter. Gray left her husband in early 1993 and moved in with their friend and her lover, Jim Wilkins, and his young son Jason. In June 1993, she filed for divorce from Gray, although this was not finalized until after Dana had been in jail for quite some time. In September 1993, she and Gray filed for bankruptcy to stave off foreclosure on their Canyon Lake house. Although the house's value had significantly increased since they purchased it, they owed much more on the house than it was worth. On November 24, 1993, she was fired from the hospital where she worked for misappropriating Demerol and other opiate painkillers.

On February 14, 1994, Dana sent word through Gray's parents (Gray kept his phone number and address hidden from her) that she wanted to meet with her estranged husband. Gray initially agreed but did not show up. Later that day, Dana reportedly murdered Norma Davis, an elderly lady whose home Dana had shared for a time. Gray later discovered that Dana had taken out an insurance policy on him. The policy would have paid off the Canyon Lake house in the event of Gray's death.

== Murder victims ==
=== Norma Davis ===
Norma Davis, 86, is thought to have been Gray's first victim. Due to the lack of evidence, Gray was never convicted of killing her. Davis was the mother-in-law of the woman (Jeri Davis) who married Gray's father, Russell Armbrust, in 1988. Jeri Davis' first husband, Bill Davis, was Norma Davis' son. Davis died in the early 1980s, and his widow eventually married Armbrust.

Jeri Davis continued to care for her elderly mother-in-law even after she remarried. Gray knew Norma Davis very well. On February 16, 1994, Davis had been dead for two days when she was found by a neighbor, Alice Williams. Davis had a wood-handled utility knife sticking out of her neck and a fillet knife sticking out of her chest. Other than a broken fingernail, she had no other marks. A bloodied afghan lay at her feet. Detectives learned that there was no forced entry into the house.

Detectives were informed that she always kept her door locked unless she was expecting a visitor. Williams stated she could not remember Davis mentioning she was expecting company. Detectives found a Nike shoe print pointed toward the kitchen. They also found Davis' $148 Social Security check. On the first floor of Davis' condo, a smear of blood was found on an armchair. A ripped-out phone cord was also found.

=== June Roberts ===
Gray killed June Roberts, 66, on February 28, 1994. Roberts, like Norma Davis, lived in the gated community of Canyon Lake. Gray had visited Roberts one day, claiming she wanted to borrow a book about controlling a drinking problem. Roberts let Gray into her house. While Roberts searched for the book, Gray unplugged Roberts' phone, both cords. She used the telephone cord to strangle Roberts. Gray then rifled through Roberts' credit cards, stealing two, and went on a massive shopping spree at an upscale shopping center in nearby Temecula.

=== Dora Beebe ===
On March 16, 1994, Gray killed Dora Beebe, 87, of Sun City, California. A few minutes after Beebe came home from a doctor's appointment, Gray pulled up in front of Beebe's house. Gray knocked on Beebe's door and asked Beebe for directions. Beebe invited Gray inside to look at a map. Once inside, Gray attacked and killed Beebe. Beebe was found later that day by her boyfriend of eight years, Louis Dormand. An hour later, Gray used Beebe's credit card and checkbook to go on a shopping spree.

== Other victims ==
=== Dorinda Hawkins (1936-2003) ===
Gray attacked Hawkins on March 10, 1994, at her job at an antique store. Hawkins had been working alone that day. Gray came in to buy a picture frame for a photo of her deceased mother. Gray strangled Hawkins with a telephone cord, but Hawkins aged 57-58, much younger than Davis and Beebe, survived. She took $5 from Hawkins' purse and $20 from the cash register. Gray went on another shopping spree an hour later using Roberts' credit card. Hawkins was able to give detectives a description of Gray. The next day, the story was in the newspaper.

== Effects of killings ==
Many of the residents of Canyon Lake were terrified. Some moved in with loved ones until the murders were solved. A group of elderly widows began sleeping in big groups at designated houses. They believed there was safety in numbers. A few residents theorized the murders were committed by a cult who engaged in ritual sacrifice.

== Potential suspects ==
Detectives had problems finding suspects early on. At one point, it was so hard to find a lead that the supervisor in charge recommended using a psychic.

=== Jeri Armbrust ===
In the case of Norma Davis, detectives initially suspected Jeri Armbrust might be the killer. From talking to Armbrust, detectives learned she used to be married to Davis' son. After Norma Davis' son died, Jeri cared for her former mother-in-law. When Jeri remarried, it was to Russell Armbrust, Dana Gray's father. Hence, Dana's connection to Norma Davis. Davis was in feeble health and was still recovering from triple bypass surgery. Detectives also speculated that Jeri Armbrust had been in Davis' house the Sunday before the murder.

Jeri Armbrust claimed she only stopped by Davis' house to drop off groceries and heard Davis' TV on upstairs but did not say hello; she just left and went home. Detectives found it unusual for Jeri Armbrust to take care of someone who was not a blood relative, and she was wearing Nikes, and they also wondered why she would not have said hello to Davis. After weeks of talking with Armbrust and building a rapport, Detective Joseph Greco, a lead investigator, realized she was not the killer. Greco and Jeri Armbrust became friends and began helping each other during the investigation. It was this relationship and trust that would be pivotal in solving this case.

== Lead detectives ==
=== Joseph Greco ===
Detective Joseph Greco of the Perris Police Department led the investigations into the murders of Norma Davis and June Roberts. He graduated from the Riverside County Sheriff's Academy as a pre-service student and ranked among his graduating class's top ten (#7). Greco received numerous awards, including the Medal of Valor, for running into a plane to save victims of an accident at Perris Valley Airport on April 22, 1992.

Greco was promoted to Corporal in 1992 and assigned as an investigator on all major crimes against persons. The first victim, 86-year-old Norma Davis case, in 1994, was only Greco's second homicide investigation. Because of the seriousness of the crimes and his lack of experience, Greco initially questioned his ability to do an adequate investigation but would eventually solve the case. Greco suspected that the Roberts and Davis cases were connected due to evidence collected in the case and ultimately discovered it was the work of one female killer. He identified Dana Sue Gray as a potential suspect and got a search warrant for her residence in Lake Elsinore, California. The search of Gray's home revealed vital information belonging not only to Roberts but also to Dora Beebe and to a surprise third victim, Dorinda Hawkins (1936–2003), the only woman who was not attacked at home and the only survivor. Hawkins later positively identified Gray through a photo line-up. Faced with a mountain of strong circumstantial evidence in the case against her, along with the threat of the death penalty, Gray would eventually plead to life without the possibility of parole and waive all of her appellate rights. She made one condition, that the State not prosecute her for the murder of Norma Davis.

Greco worked for the Riverside County Sheriff's Department's Lake Elsinore Station, specializing in elder abuse, sexual assault, and child abuse cases from 1998 to 2010. He was later promoted to the rank of Sergeant in March 2010. Television documentaries involving Detective Greco include: The "Discovery Channel" for the following shows: "The New Detectives", Season 7, Episode 1, (New Dominion Pictures 2000), "Deadly Women" (Beyond Productions 2009)", Unusual Suspects" (LMNO Productions 2009) and "Forensic Factor 2" (Exploration Productions 2009).

=== Chris Antoniadas ===
Detective Chris Antoniadas was the lead detective on the Dora Beebe case. After Detective Greco finished interviewing her, Antoniadas interviewed Gray. Gray was cold and unresponsive to any of his approaches. He finally decided he needed to take some of Gray's control away from her, interrogating her roughly, and yelling at her to confess, but was unsuccessful. He then charged Gray with the murder of Dora Beebe based upon the discovery of Beebe's credit cards in Gray's sock drawer during the execution of Detective Greco's search warrant.

== Case ==
Gray was finally caught because her description was obtained from various merchants in the Temecula, California area, where she used June Roberts' credit cards to go on a shopping spree. Dana had been spending so much money that the credit card company called June Roberts' family to alert them of the massive spending. The detectives then went to all the stores where Gray used the credit cards and interviewed the cashiers, getting a physical description of Gray. They also learned the killer had dyed her hair recently and had a little boy named Jason.

Detective Greco kept in touch with Jeri Armbrust. He began describing the killer to her on a visit to her home. The next day, Jeri revealed to Greco that she believed the suspect to be her stepdaughter. Dana had just dyed her hair and had a son named Jason with her boyfriend. Detective Greco wrote a search warrant for Gray's home and enlisted the help of ARCNET (Allied Riverside County Narcotics Enforcement Team) to stake out Gray's home in Lake Elsinore. Unbeknownst to the team, Gray was murdering Dora Beebe in Sun City just hours before they began following her, trying to collect evidence. After seeing Dana go to the bank with Beebe's card and then go shopping, the detectives had enough information for the nexus involving Dora Beebe's murder. Later that day (17 March 1994) Greco arrested Dana while she was cooking dinner for her family. Detective Greco took Dana into custody while assisting officers took her boyfriend and his son down to the station for questioning. During questioning, Dana claimed she never took the credit cards. After detectives said they had evidence of her using them, Dana claimed she found Roberts' and Beebe's cards. She stuck with this story for hours. She claimed she kept the cards because she had an overwhelming need to shop. She also seemed to have no sympathy for the victims.

Detective Antoniadas attempted to obtain a confession after Detective Greco's interview but was unsuccessful. Detective Greco eventually booked Gray on charges of murder. At a hearing on July 23, Deputy DA Richard Bentley requested the death penalty. Gray pleaded insanity on all counts. After a witness claimed to have seen Gray at Roberts' house on the day of Roberts' murder, September 9, 1998, Gray changed her plea to guilty of robbing and murdering two women and attempting to murder another, thus avoiding the death penalty. On October 16, 1998, Gray was sentenced to life without parole and is incarcerated in the California Women's Prison in Chowchilla.

== In media ==
The case was featured in a LMN (Lifetime Movie Network) 2015 episode of Diabolical Women.

Gray's murder spree was also featured in a 2017 episode of It Takes A Killer on the television channel Escape.

The case was also featured in Discovery Channel's series The New Detectives season 7 episode 1, which aired May 5, 2001. The case was also featured on Discovery Channel's series Forensic Factor episode 43, which aired on July 23, 2010.

On February 2, 2025, the true crime TV series Very Scary People first aired the episode, "The Angel of Death" about the life of Dana Sue Gray.

== See also ==
- List of serial killers in the United States
