= Richard Benjamin =

American actor (born 1938)

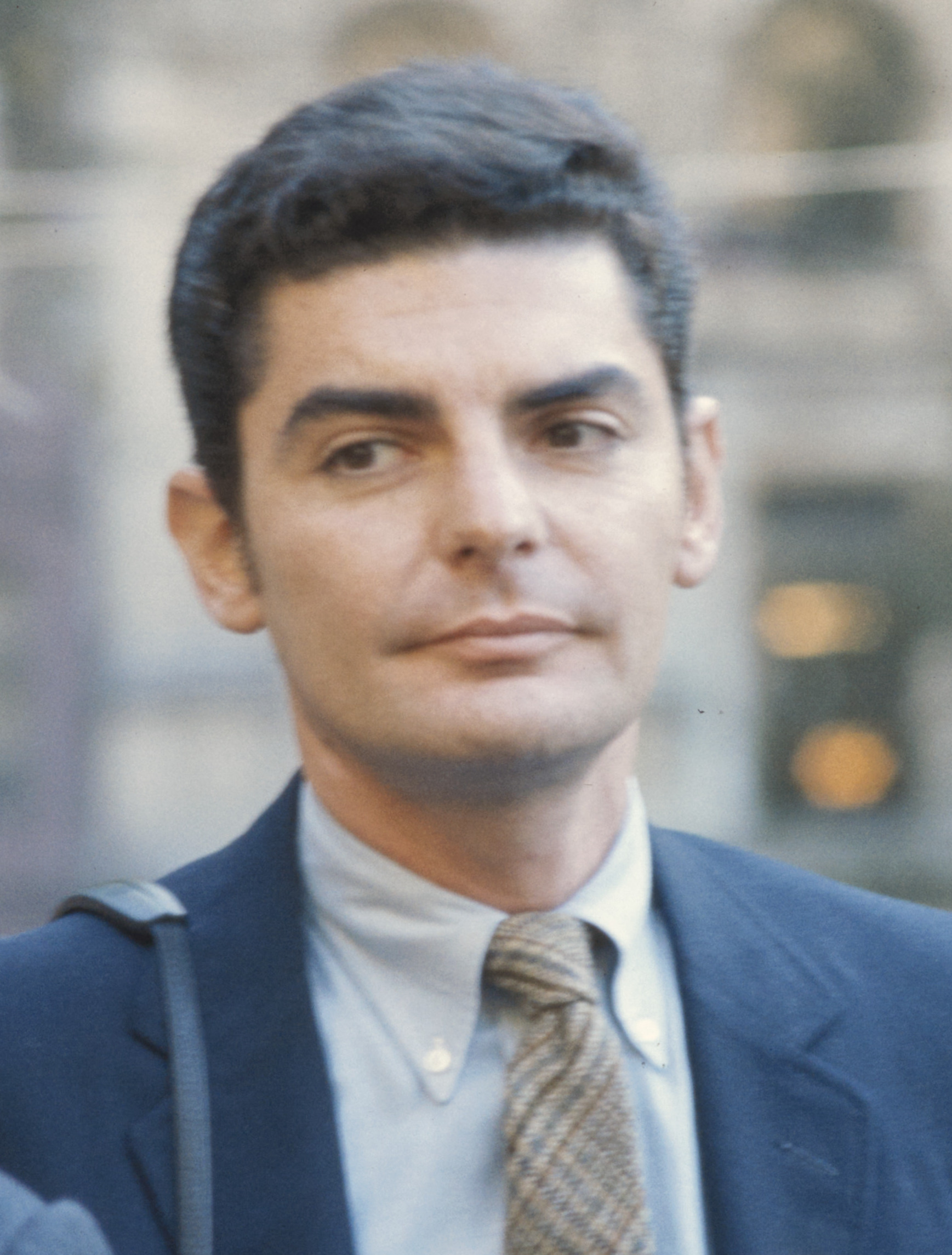
- Benjamin in 1972
- Born: Richard Samuel Benjamin; May 22, 1938 (age 88); New York City, U.S.
- Education: Northwestern University
- Occupations: Actor; director; producer
- Years active: 1962–present
- Spouse: Paula Prentiss (m. 1961)
- Children: 2
- Relatives: Joe Browning (uncle)

Richard Samuel Benjamin (born May 22, 1938) is an American actor and director. He has starred in a number of well-known films, including Goodbye, Columbus (1969), Catch-22 (1970), Portnoy's Complaint (1972), Westworld, The Last of Sheila (both 1973) and Saturday the 14th (1981). In 1968, Benjamin was nominated for an Emmy Award for Best Actor in a Comedy Series for his performance on the CBS sitcom He & She (starring opposite his wife Paula Prentiss), which aired from 1967–1968. In 1976, Benjamin received a Golden Globe for his performance as aged vaudevillian Willy Clark's (Walter Matthau) comedically long-suffering nephew, confidante and talent agent, Ben Clark, in Herbert Ross' The Sunshine Boys (1975), based on Neil Simon's 1972 hit stage play of the same name.

After directing for television, his first film as a director was the 1982 comedy My Favorite Year, starring Peter O'Toole, who was nominated for an Academy Award for Best Actor. His other films as a director include City Heat (1984), The Money Pit (1986), My Stepmother Is an Alien (1988), Mermaids (1990), Made in America (1993), Milk Money (1994), Mrs. Winterbourne (1996), and Marci X (2003).

== Early life ==
Benjamin was born in New York City, the son of Samuel Roger Benjamin, a garment industry worker. Benjamin's uncle was vaudeville comedian Joe Browning. His family was Jewish. He attended the High School of Performing Arts and graduated from Northwestern University, where he was involved in many plays and studied in the Northwestern theater school. While there, he met future wife Paula Prentiss.

== Career ==
=== Theatre ===
Benjamin appeared on stage in The Taming of the Shrew and guest-starred on shows such as The New Breed and Dr. Kildare. Benjamin's early break came when cast in the touring company of Barefoot in the Park in 1964. He later toured in The Odd Couple with Dan Dailey. In 1966, he directed Barefoot in the Park on stage in London. Simon was pleased with Benjamin's work and cast him in his new play The Star-Spangled Girl (1966–67) directed by George Axelrod. Benjamin appeared alongside Anthony Perkins and Connie Stevens, and the show ran for 261 performances. The success of the show led to Benjamin appearing in a television series with his wife Paula, He & She (1967–68). It ran for 26 episodes.

=== Stardom ===
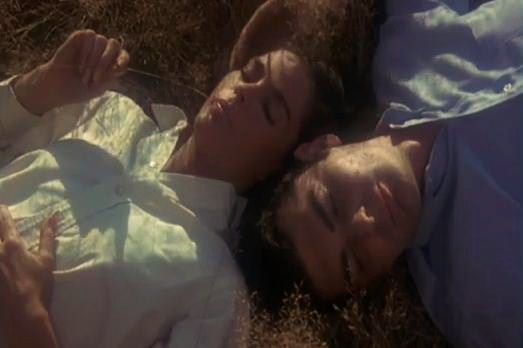
Ali MacGraw and Richard Benjamin in Goodbye, Columbus in 1969

Benjamin's first lead role in a film came with an adaptation of the Philip Roth novella, Goodbye, Columbus (1969) with Ali MacGraw. It was a critical and commercial hit. He followed it with a key support role in the film of Catch-22 (1970). He was top billed in Diary of a Mad Housewife (1970) from the team of Eleanor and Frank Perry, appearing alongside Carrie Snodgress and Frank Langella. He directed his wife off-Broadway in Arf/The Great Airplane Snatch (1969), which ran for five performances.

Benjamin played the lead in The Marriage of a Young Stockbroker (1971), directed by the producer and the original author of The Graduate, though it was not as successful. He acted in a comedy, The Steagle (1971), the directorial debut of designer Paul Sylbert, which was little seen. Another box-office flop was the film of Roth's Portnoy's Complaint (1972), the sole directorial effort of Ernest Lehman.

In 1972 Benjamin returned to Broadway with The Little Black Book, which only ran for nine performances. He then acted in two more successful films, as part of an all-star cast in The Last of Sheila (1973), from a script by Anthony Perkins and Stephen Sondheim, and in Westworld (1973), directed by Michael Crichton and co-starring Yul Brynner. The Los Angeles Times stated that by this stage, his image was of "a whining, petulant bore by doing too good a job of acting in a series of sleazy roles." He decided to steer away from such roles by turning down a part in The Towering Inferno (which Richard Chamberlain ended up playing).

=== Supporting actor ===
Benjamin supported Walter Matthau and George Burns in the film adaptation of Neil Simon's The Sunshine Boys (1975), for which he won a Golden Globe Award for Best Supporting Actor in a Motion Picture. He starred with Prentiss in The Norman Conquests (1975–76) on Broadway, which went for 76 performances. The couple went to Australia to make No Room to Run (1978). In Hollywood, Benjamin supported Matthau and Glenda Jackson in House Calls (1978).

In 1978, he starred in the ambitious but short-lived television series Quark. The same year he appeared in a TV film Fame, written by Arthur Miller. Benjamin played a frustrated fiancé of a woman who falls for the vampire Count Dracula in the surprise box-office smash Love at First Bite (1979) starring George Hamilton and Susan Saint James.

Benjamin has hosted Saturday Night Live twice, once by himself on April 7, 1979 and the other nearly a year later on April 5, 1980 with his wife Paula Prentiss. He was top billed in Scavenger Hunt (1979), an ensemble film.

Benjamin had directed in theatre and was keen to do it in film. In 1979, Benjamin directed for the first time, creating a pilot for a sitcom spin-off of the film Where's Poppa? by Carl Reiner. "The pilot turned out really well," said Benjamin. "But I don't think ABC ever quite 'got' it. They never did put the show on the air... At least I could prove that I wasn't nuts, that I really had actually directed something." He directed one episode of the 1980 TV series Semi-Tough.

Benjamin had supporting roles in The Last Married Couple in America (1980), How to Beat the High Co$t of Living (1980), Witches' Brew (1980), and First Family (1980). He and Prentiss played the leads in Saturday the 14th (1981). They also began hosting corporate videos.

=== Feature film director ===
Benjamin's work on the Where's Poppa? pilot saw him offered the job as director on My Favorite Year (1982) starring Peter O'Toole. The film was warmly received, earning O'Toole an Oscar nomination for Best Actor and launched Benjamin as a director.

Benjamin and Prentiss returned to acting with the TV movie Packin' It In (1983). He said, "If I get a wonderful script to act in and a mediocre script to direct, I'll act. And the same principle applies the other way around. It's the material that counts." He focused on directing, though, for the next decade. Benjamin's second feature as director was Racing with the Moon (1984) from a script by Steve Kloves starring Sean Penn and Nicolas Cage. He was then called in at short notice to replace Blake Edwards on City Heat (1984) with Clint Eastwood and Burt Reynolds, which was a critical and commercial disappointment.

Benjamin directed a comedy for Steven Spielberg's company, The Money Pit (1986) with Tom Hanks and Shelley Long. He then directed a thriller Little Nikita (1988) with Sidney Poitier and River Phoenix, and a comedy with Dan Aykroyd, My Stepmother Is an Alien (1988). Benjamin did another comedy, Downtown (1990), with Anthony Edwards and Forest Whitaker. He had a moderate hit with Mermaids (1990) starring Cher and Winona Ryder.

Made in America (1993) with Whoopi Goldberg and Ted Danson was also successful. Milk Money (1994) with Melanie Griffith and Ed Harris was less so. He also directed Mrs. Winterbourne (1996).

In the 1990s and 2000s, Benjamin returned to acting. In 1998, Benjamin and Prentiss performed Power Plays on stage. Benjamin also made appearances on TV shows including The Ray Bradbury Theater, Love & War, Ink, Mad About You, and Titus, as well as the films Deconstructing Harry (1997), Keeping Up with the Steins (2006), and Henry Poole Is Here (2008). Benjamin returned to directing features with The Shrink Is In (2001) and Marci X (2003), a satirical comedy starring Lisa Kudrow and Damon Wayans which attempted to explore the intersection of white liberal identity and hip-hop culture. The film was a critical and commercial failure, receiving an 8% rating on Rotten Tomatoes and grossing only $1.7 million against a reported $20 million budget. Critics widely panned its tone and racial politics, with The Boston Globe calling it "clueless and sad," and The A.V. Club describing it as "the year's most misguided culture-clash comedy." While a few, including critic Armond White, defended its satirical intentions, the film remains a notable outlier in Benjamin's directorial career and is largely absent from retrospectives of his work.

=== TV directing ===
Benjamin did some directing for TV – The Pentagon Wars (1998), Tourist Trap (1999), The Sports Pages (2001), and Laughter on the 23rd Floor (2001) from the play by Neil Simon.

He produced and directed a TV adaptation of Simon's The Goodbye Girl (2004) with Jeff Daniels and Patricia Heaton. In 2006, Benjamin directed the award-winning cable television drama A Little Thing Called Murder, starring Australian Judy Davis. It was based on the true story of Sante and Kenny Kimes, mother and son grifters and killers.

His later acting appearances on television include Ray Donovan and Childrens Hospital. He most recently played Dr. Green in the Netflix comedy film You People (2023) opposite Jonah Hill and Julia Louis-Dreyfus.

== Personal life ==
Benjamin and Paula Prentiss met at Northwestern University; she had transferred from Randolph-Macon Woman's College and was a year ahead of Benjamin at the university. They married on October 26, 1961, and have two children, a son and a daughter, both graduates of Beverly Hills High School.

== Filmography ==
=== Actor ===
==== Film ====
Year	Title	Role	Notes
1969	Goodbye, Columbus	Neil Klugman	
1970	Catch-22	Maj. Danby	
1970	Diary of a Mad Housewife	Jonathan Balser	
1971	The Marriage of a Young Stockbroker	William Alren	
1971	The Steagle	Harold Weiss, B.A., M.A., Ph.D.	
1972	Portnoy's Complaint	Alexander Portnoy	
1973	The Last of Sheila	Tom Parkman	
1973	Westworld	Peter Martin	
1975	The Sunshine Boys	Ben Clark	
1978	House Calls	Dr. Norman Solomon	
1979	Love at First Bite	Dr. Jeffery Rosenberg / Van Helsing	
1979	Scavenger Hunt	Stuart Selsome	
1980	The Last Married Couple in America	Marv Cooper	
1980	How to Beat the High Co$t of Living	Albert	
1980	Witches' Brew	Joshua Lightman	
1980	First Family	Press Secretary Bunthorne	
1981	Saturday the 14th	John Hyatt	
1992	Lift	Rabbi Brill	Short
1997	Deconstructing Harry	Ken	
2001	The Shrink Is In	Samantha's Editor	Uncredited
2003	Marci X	Ben Feld	
2006	Keeping Up with the Steins	Rabbi Schulberg	
2008	Henry Poole Is Here	Dr. Fancher	
2012	Pablo	Himself	
2023	You People	Dr. Green	
2023	Ex-Husbands	Simon Pearce	

==== Television ====
Year	Title	Role	Notes
1962	The New Breed	Intern	Episode: "All the Dead Faces"
1962–1963	Dr. Kildare	Dr. Adam Barstow / Intern	2 episodes
1966	Vacation Playhouse	Ted Penny	Episode: "My Lucky Penny"
1967–1968	He & She	Dick Hollister	26 episodes
1969	Get Smart	Director and cameo as crime scene photographer	Episode: "The Apes of Rath"
1977	No Room to Run	Nick Loomis	TV movie
1977–1978	Quark	Adam Quark	8 episodes
1979–1980	Saturday Night Live	Himself (host)	2 episodes
1981	Insight	Brad	Episode: "Goodbye"
1983	Packin' It In	Gary Webber	TV movie
1992	The Ray Bradbury Theater	Mr. Howard	Episode: "Let's Play Poison"
1994	Love & War	Charles Berkus	Episode: "The Great Escape"
1997	Ink	Dr. Vishniac	Episode: "The English-Speaking Patients"
1998	The Pentagon Wars	Caspar Weinberger	TV movie
1999	Mad About You	Mr. Frank DiChristophoro	Episode: "Valentine's Day"
2000	Titus	Bill	Episode: "The Reconciliation"
2004	The Goodbye Girl	Oliver Fry	TV movie
2009	Pushing Daisies	Jerry Holmes	Episode: "Window Dressed to Kill"
2014	Ray Donovan	Jerry Weiss	Episode: "Sunny"
2015	Childrens Hospital	Dan Richards	Episode: "With Great Power..."

=== Director ===
Film

- My Favorite Year (1982)
- Racing with the Moon (1984)
- City Heat (1984)
- The Money Pit (1986)
- Little Nikita (1988)
- My Stepmother Is an Alien (1988)
- Downtown (1990)
- Mermaids (1990)
- Made in America (1993)
- Milk Money (1994)
- Mrs. Winterbourne (1996)
- The Shrink Is In (2001)
- Marci X (2003)

TV movies

- Tourist Trap (1998)
- The Pentagon Wars (1998)
- Laughter on the 23rd Floor (2001)
- The Sports Pages (2001)
- The Goodbye Girl (2004)
- A Little Thing Called Murder (2006)

TV series

- The Wonderful World of Disney (1998) (Episode "Tourist Trap")
