= Marci X =

- Theatrical release poster
- Directed by: Richard Benjamin
- Written by: Paul Rudnick
- Produced by: Scott Rudin
- Starring: Lisa Kudrow; Damon Wayans; Richard Benjamin; Christine Baranski; Paula Garcés
- Cinematography: Robbie Greenberg
- Edited by: Jacqueline Cambas
- Music by: Mervyn Warren
- Production company: Scott Rudin Productions
- Distributed by: Paramount Pictures
- Release date: August 22, 2003
- Running time: 84 minutes
- Country: United States
- Language: English
- Budget: $20 million
- Box office: $1.7 million

Marci X is a 2003 American romantic comedy film directed by Richard Benjamin, written by Paul Rudnick, and starring Lisa Kudrow as Jewish-American Princess Marci Feld, who has to take control of a hip-hop record label, as well as the controversial rapper Dr. S, played by Damon Wayans. The film was released on August 22, 2003, by Paramount Pictures. It received negative reviews and was a box office flop, grossing $1.7 million worldwide against a $20 million budget.

== Plot ==
Marci Feld, a spoiled Jewish-American princess, is forced to take control of her father Ben's hardcore rap label Felony Assault when he suffers a stress-induced heart attack due to the controversy surrounding the label's release of "Shoot Ya' Teacha" by Dr. S. To rescue her father's plummeting stock, Marci attempts to tone down the rapper's bad-boy image. Over time, the unlikely pair falls in love just as conservative senator Mary Ellen Spinkle vows to banish Dr. S and his offensive lyrics from the airwaves forever.

== Cast ==
- Lisa Kudrow as Marci Feld
- Damon Wayans as Dr. S
- Richard Benjamin as Ben Feld
- Jane Krakowski as Lauren Farb
- Christine Baranski as Mary Ellen Spinkle
- Paula Garcés as Yolanda Quinones
- Charles Kimbrough as Lane Strayfield
- Veanne Cox as Caitlin Mellowitz
- Sherie Rene Scott as Kirsten Blatt
- Nashawn Kearse as Quantrelle
- Billy Griffith as Tubby Fenders
- Andrew Keenan-Bolger as Chip Spinkle
- Matthew Morrison as Boyz R Us Member
- Gerry Becker as Dr. Skellar
- Bruce Altman as Stan Dawes
- Walter Bobbie as Walt Seldon
- Mustafa Shakir as Engine Trouble
- Kaity Tong as herself
- Jim Watkins as himself
- Mary Murphy as herself
- Zach Tyler Eisen as Boy
- Alexandra Neil as Auction Woman
- Mimi Weddell as Auction Woman
- Mary Hart as herself
- Hassan Johnson as Tinfoil
- Jade Yorker as Teenager
- Queen Esther as Audience Member
- Dean Edwards as Audience Member
- Lisa Emery as Parent
- Ted Sutton as Chuck Farley
- Erik LaRay Harvey as Stage Manager
- Myk Watford as Police Officer
- Nancy Opel as Reporter
- Jack Koenig as Reporter
- Steven Wishnoff as Prison Drag Queen (credited as Steven E Wishnoff)

== Production ==
In September 2000, Paul Rudnick scripted Marci X, a fish-out-of-water comedy following a Jewish American Princess who is forced to take control of a hard-core hip-hop record label and address the controversy of one of its label's artists, was one of the Scott Rudin Productions produced films fast-tracked into production in order to have releasable product on hand in the event of possible strikes by the writers and actors guilds. The following month it was announced Lisa Kudrow was in talks to star in the film.

Chris Rock was offered the role of Dr. S, but turned it down as he did not like the script.

== Reception ==
=== Box office ===
Marci X earned $872,950 in its opening weekend, ranking #18 in the North American box office from 1,200 venues. The film grossed $1,648,818 at the North American box office, and $26,888 overseas for a worldwide total of $1,675,706. Based on a $20 million budget, the film was a box office bomb.

=== Critical response ===
On the review aggregator website Rotten Tomatoes, 8% of 61 critics' reviews are positive, with an average rating of 3.4/10. The website's consensus reads: "The material is too thin for feature-length, and the jokes are socially outdated and clueless." Metacritic, which uses a weighted average, assigned the film a score of 20 out of 100, based on 17 critics, indicating "generally unfavorable" reviews.

Wesley Morris of The Boston Globe felt the film had "no idea what to make of black people or hip-hop culture", noting how Rudnick's script is filled with "half-hearted structuring" and is "exasperating in its enervated, politically toothless jabs." He concluded that Marci X is "just clueless and sad, seemingly having missed the point that hip-hop is no longer a novelty to be slapped on the cheek with a white glove." Nathan Rabin of The A.V. Club also criticized Rudnick's scripting of the film for being "a series of skit ideas strung together", and felt that Wayans was "woefully miscast as a charismatic thug." He concluded by calling it "the year's most misguided culture-clash comedy." The Austin Chronicle's Marjorie Baumgarten felt the premise was filled with "possibilities for good culture-clash humor à la Rock 'n' Roll High School," but played everything straightforward, saying that it "exudes the familiar stench of stale comedy routinely tossed into theatres by the studios in the dog days of August when no one's really looking anyway." Ed Gonzalez from Slant Magazine wrote that: "Marci X is a sketch comedy that misses more than it hits. And not unlike Danny DeVito's Death to Smoochy, the worst thing that can be said about it is that it's a good decade too late." Mick LaSalle of the San Francisco Chronicle called it "a dishonest satire that manages to be (disingenuously) contemptuous of white people and (unintentionally) condescending toward black people, without ever being funny."

The film received some positive reviews. Armond White praised the film's satire of its subject matter, saying it "sarcastically tackles hip hop sanctimony at a time in which it should be ripe for debunking." He also gave note of the performances of Wayans and Kudrow, saying that "Both these experienced comic performers understand that comedy respects no sacred cows. They are merciless in their satirical routines out of respect for the truth of human behavior." Jonathan Rosenbaum from the Chicago Reader said, "It's no masterpiece, but I found it consistently good-hearted and sometimes hilarious, and the sparse crowd I saw it with was laughing as much as I was, especially at the outrageous rap numbers." Entertainment Weekly's Lisa Schwarzbaum commended the movie for being a "lighter-than-Bulworth commentary on class, politics, and art" despite feeling "disconnected from its own objects of ridicule", calling it "a talent-stuffed assemblage of barbs and giddy musical numbers that shouldn't be written off as a feature flop — but savored instead for the cult-ready collection of late-night satirical skits and misses it is."
