= Little Nikita =

1988 film by Richard Benjamin

- Theatrical release poster
- Directed by: Richard Benjamin
- Written by: Bo Goldman; John Hill
- Produced by: Harry Gittes
- Starring: River Phoenix; Sidney Poitier; Richard Bradford; Richard Lynch
- Cinematography: László Kovács
- Edited by: Jacqueline Cambas
- Music by: Marvin Hamlisch
- Distributed by: Columbia Pictures
- Release date: March 18, 1988
- Running time: 98 minutes
- Country: United States
- Language: English
- Budget: $15 million
- Box office: $1.7 million (domestic)

Little Nikita is a 1988 American thriller film directed by Richard Benjamin and starring River Phoenix and Sidney Poitier.

== Plot ==
Jeffrey Nicolas Grant (River Phoenix), a brash hyperactive high school student, lives in a San Diego suburb with his parents, who own a successful garden center. Keen to fly, he has applied for entry to the Air Force Academy.

During a routine background check on Jeff, FBI agent Roy Parmenter (Poitier) finds evidence they may be sleeper agents for the Soviet Union. Unable to arrest them as they have not done anything illegal, Roy continues his investigation, moves into the house across the street from the Grant family, and worms his way into their confidence.

He eventually confronts Jeff with his suspicions and seeks Jeff's cooperation to learn more about his parents. Initially unbelieving, Jeff is soon forced to accept the facts and discovers that even his name is fictitious and that his real name is Nikita.

Roy confides to Jeff that twenty years earlier, his partner was killed by a Soviet agent, known only as 'Scuba' (Richard Lynch), and that he is still at large. 'Scuba' is now a rogue agent, killing KGB agents one by one, including "sleepers". Meanwhile, a Soviet spy-catcher, Konstantin Karpov (Richard Bradford), has been sent from the Soviet embassy in Mexico City to 'reel in' Scuba.

Jeff is captured and held as a hostage at gunpoint by Karpov, as he and 'Scuba' make their way to the Mexican border on the San Diego Trolley. Roy has also confronted them and is holding Karpov at gunpoint. At the border, the situation resolves itself; Karpov and 'Scuba' cross into Mexico, and the Grant family remain in the United States.

== Cast ==
- Sidney Poitier as Roy Parmenter
- River Phoenix as Jeff Grant / Nikita
- Richard Jenkins as Richard Grant
- Caroline Kava as Elizabeth Grant
- Richard Bradford as Konstantin Karpov
- Loretta Devine as Verna McLaughlin
- Richard Lynch as Scuba
- Lucy Deakins as Barbara Kerry

In addition, the film co-starred Jerry Hardin as Brewer, Albert Fortell as Bunin, Ronald Guttman as Spassky and Jacob Vargas as Miguel.

== Production ==
A parade scene was filmed in downtown La Mesa and much of the principal photography occurred throughout San Diego.

== Reception ==
The movie received mixed reviews and holds a "Rotten" score of 50% on Rotten Tomatoes from a sample of 16 critics.

Walter Goodman said that Benjamin's directing strategy in the film "seems to have been to paper over the holes in the plot with routine moves from spy shows past, in hopes of making the improbable passable." Roger Ebert awarded the film one and a half stars, suspecting that Poitier and the makers of the film had no idea of how to use a computer, and that "it turns all of the characters into chess pieces, whose relationships depend on the plot, not on human chemistry. Since the plot is absurdly illogical, you're not left with much."

=== Box office ===
It grossed $866,398 on its opening weekend. It went on to make $1.7 million in North America, making it a box office bomb against its $15 million budget.

== See also ==
- List of media set in San Diego
