= Made in America (1993 film) =

1993 film by Richard Benjamin

- Theatrical release poster
- Directed by: Richard Benjamin
- Screenplay by: Holly Goldberg Sloan
- Story by: Marcia Brandwynne; Nadine Schiff; Holly Goldberg Sloan
- Produced by: Arnon Milchan; Michael Douglas; Rick Bieber
- Starring: Whoopi Goldberg; Ted Danson; Will Smith
- Cinematography: Ralf Bode
- Edited by: Jacqueline Cambas
- Music by: Mark Isham
- Production companies: Le Studio Canal+ Regency Enterprises; Alcor Films; Stonebridge Entertainment; Kalola Productions, Inc.
- Distributed by: Warner Bros.
- Release date: May 28, 1993
- Running time: 111 minutes
- Country: United States
- Language: English
- Budget: $22 million
- Box office: $104.9 million

Made in America is a 1993 American comedy film starring Whoopi Goldberg and Ted Danson, and featuring Nia Long, Jennifer Tilly and Will Smith. The film was directed by Richard Benjamin. It was shot in various locations in Oakland, California, and at Oakland Technical High School.

"Colors of Love," written by Carole Bayer Sager, James Ingram and Bruce Roberts, and produced by David Foster is a notable song on the soundtrack which alludes to the story line.

== Plot ==
Zora Matthews takes a blood test and discovers she has a blood group which is not a possible combination of the groups of her deceased father and her mother Sarah. She confronts her mother and is told her Mom used donor sperm to get pregnant with her because she couldn't get pregnant by her husband who Zora thought was her father.

Zora's curiosity gets the better of her and she gets her best friend Tea Cake to go to the sperm bank and pretend to be a donor while she sneaks in to look at the records. Zora gets into the computer and the records show her mother was matched with a Halbert Jackson and gives his social security number.

In his luxury mansion, Hal finishes a night of sex with his young girlfriend Stacy before setting off to work. As he reverses out of the garage, Zora gets in the way. She gets in his pickup truck and he goes to his work: Jackson's Motors. She is shocked that he is white. Hal is a flamboyant salesman of his own premises and is shooting an advert with a real bear. Zora interrupts and tells him he is her father. He does not behave well and shows no sympathy or empathy.

Zora tells her Mom everything and this makes Sarah shocked and angry because she asked for a black male donor. Sarah goes to confront Hal about everything. Zora and Tea Cake follow, but Tea Cake is diverted by the car saleswoman. Sarah and Hal are very different in every way. Hal plies her with drink and she cycles off in a drunken state. Hal drives her to her shop "African Queen" with the cycle in the back of the truck. The shop specializes in black authors. Upstairs is a shrine-like room with many pictures of Zora growing up, plus pictures of Sarah's late husband Charles, who Zora had been told was her father.

Back in his mansion Hal gets emotional in regard to a father-daughter scene in a film on TV: Shirley Temple in The Little Princess.

With his penchant for hiring wild animals Hal next hires an Indian elephant but while riding it, the elephant charges off through the streets, ending in Lake Merritt. It has been following the sound of the bell on Sarah's bike. Hal takes out his anger on her bike and rips the bell off. News coverage of Hal and the elephant accidentally gives free publicity to his dealership and he has a sales bonanza on the following day.

In apology, Hal later goes to her house with a present: a new bell plus a cycling helmet. He also has a present for Zora: an atlas to encourage her world travel. His assistant Diego arrives to take Zora on a date. This inspires Hal to ask Sarah out for dinner and they go for sushi. Hal is not used to sushi and eats a whole ball of wasabi. Hal starts flirting heavily and they kiss goodnight. It gets more passionate but just as they get to the bedroom Zora and Diego get home. Zora becomes upset since she wanted to find her father but doesn't want her mom becoming romantically involved with him.

Both Hal and Sarah start thinking about each other. When Sarah goes to the dealership, they argue and Sarah cycles off in an emotional state. She gets hit by a car when she runs a red light. She is not wearing her new helmet and is badly injured. Hal and Zora go to the hospital and give blood. They sit by her bedside as she recovers.

Stacy breaks up with Hal because he was out all night. When he goes back to the hospital a medic inadvertently reveals that a blood test shows that he cannot be Zora's father. Hal tells Sarah and Zora. Zora runs off. He apologizes to Sarah.

Zora and Tea Cake graduate from school. Zora wins a Westinghouse scholarship to MIT. In her commencement speech, Zora gives her mother all the credit. Hal arrives to see Zora, who he now considers his daughter, graduate. He helps Sarah up the steps and Zora thanks her Mom and Dad.

== Cast ==
- Whoopi Goldberg as Sarah Matthews
- Ted Danson as Halbert "Hal" Jackson
- Will Smith as Tea Cake Walters
- Nia Long as Zora Matthews
- Paul Rodriguez as Jose
- Jennifer Tilly as Stacy
- Peggy Rea as Alberta, Hal's elderly secretary
- Clyde Kusatsu as Bob Takashima
- David Bowe as Teddy
- Jeff Joseph as James
- Shawn Levy as Dwayne
- Rawley Valverde as Diego
- Charlene Fernetz as Paula the car saleswoman

== Production ==
The story did not originally specify black actors for any of the roles and was rewritten upon Goldberg's casting.

== Homage ==
The character of Hal Jackson is based in part on the real life car dealership owner Cal Worthington. Hal's use of large circus animals in his car commercials are an homage to Cal's famous "My Dog Spot" ads, which were also filmed with live circus animals.

== Soundtrack ==
The soundtrack album was released on May 28, 1993.

1. Gloria Estefan – "Go Away" (U.S. #103; UK #13)
2. Keith Sweat and Silk – "Does He Do It Good"
3. Del Tha Funkee Homosapien – "Made in America"
4. Lisa Fischer – "Colors of Love" (U.S. AC #18, R&B #24)
5. Sérgio Mendes – "What Is This?"
6. Mark Isham – "Made In Love"
7. Laura Satterfield and Ephraim Lewis – "I Know I Don't Walk on Water"
8. DJ Jazzy Jeff and The Fresh Prince – "Dance or Die"
9. Deep Purple – "Smoke on the Water"
10. Ben E. King – "If You Need a Miracle"
11. Y.T. Style – "Stand"

== Reception ==
The film opened in theaters on May 28, 1993, and grossed over $12 million on its opening weekend, ranking in second place behind Cliffhanger. It was released to over 2,000 theaters and grossed nearly $50 million in the U.S. alone. Worldwide, it earned over $100 million. This was television star and Grammy Award-winning rapper Will Smith's second supporting role in a movie and started his successful career as a major film actor.

Made in America earned mostly negative reviews from critics, holding a 32% rating on Rotten Tomatoes based on 31 reviews. However, Roger Ebert praised Goldberg's acting in the film and said "This isn't a great movie, but it sure is a nice one."

Audiences polled by CinemaScore gave the film an average grade of "B+" on an A+ to F scale.
