= The Shrink Is In =

2001 television film by Richard Benjamin

- DVD cover
- Directed by: Richard Benjamin
- Written by: Alison Balian; Joanna Johnson
- Produced by: Andrew Form; Tag Mendillo
- Starring: Courteney Cox; David Arquette; David James Elliott; Carol Kane
- Cinematography: Kenneth MacMillan
- Edited by: Jacqueline Cambas
- Music by: David Lawrence; Marjorie Maye
- Distributed by: Universal Pictures
- Release date: November 1, 2001
- Running time: 87 minutes
- Country: United States
- Language: English

The Shrink Is In is a 2001 American comedy film directed by Richard Benjamin, and starring Courteney Cox and David Arquette.

== Plot ==
Samantha is a travel journalist who is still recovering from the break-up with her last boyfriend, when her psychiatrist, Dr. Louise Rosenberg, suffers a nervous breakdown. While Samantha is canceling her appointments, her new neighbor, Michael, comes for a session. Having never met the real Dr. Rosenberg, she poses as her shrink in an attempt to steer him away from his girlfriend and towards her. Because of her new situation, Samantha ends up seeing a few of Dr. Rosenberg's other patients, including eccentric magazine salesman Henry. This leads her to question her life, including whether her "perfect man" is actually what she truly desires after all.

== Cast ==
- Courteney Cox as Samantha Crumb
- David Arquette as Henry Popopolis
- David James Elliott as Michael
- Carol Kane as Dr. Louise Rosenberg
- Kimberley Davies as Isabelle
- Viola Davis as Robin
- Jon Polito as Judge Bob
- Ziggy Marley as himself
