= Philip Bosco =

American actor (1930–2018)

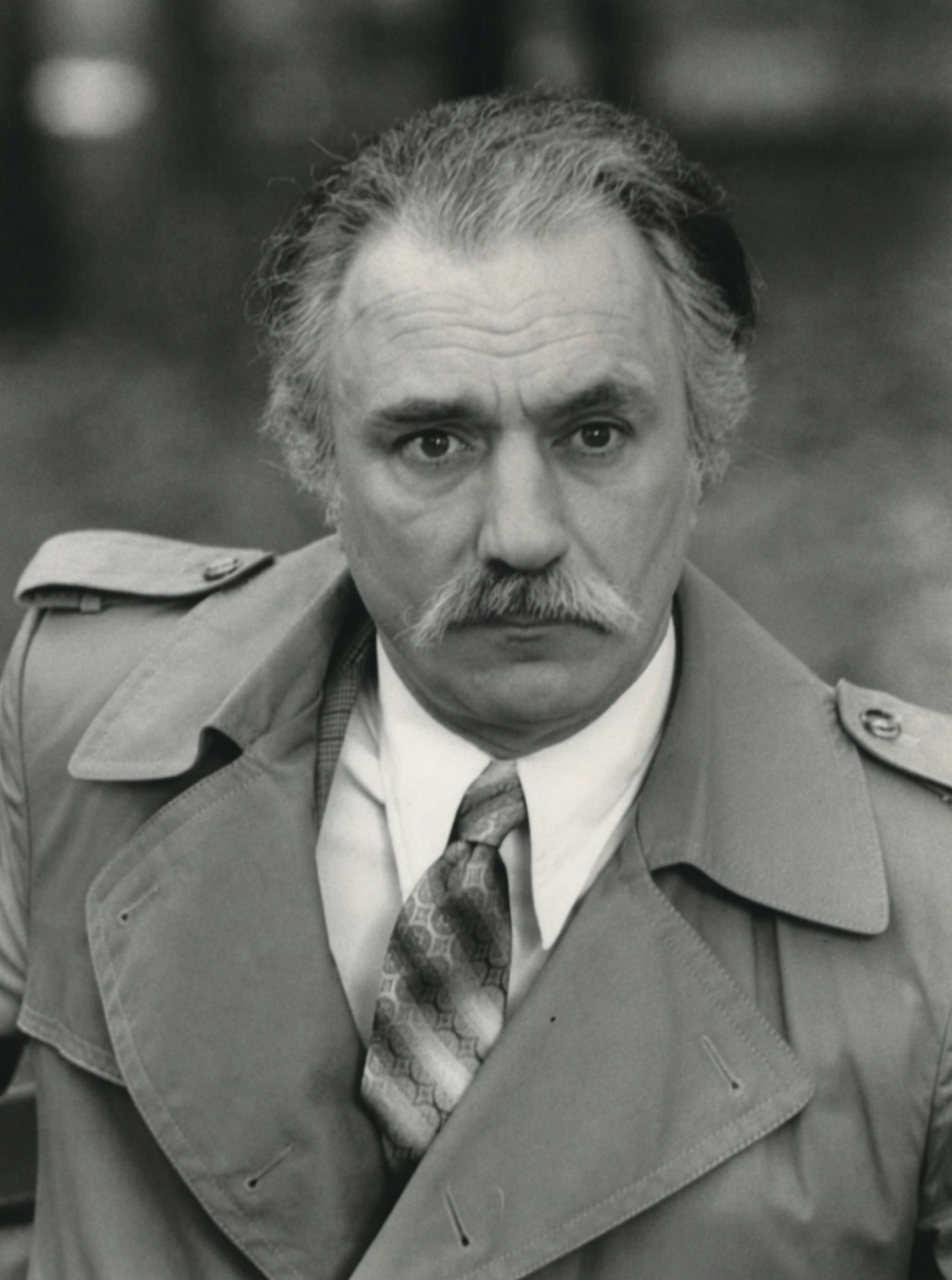
- Bosco in Nurse, 1981
- Born: Philip Michael Bosco; September 26, 1930; Jersey City, New Jersey, U.S.
- Died: December 3, 2018 (aged 88); Haworth, New Jersey, U.S.
- Occupation: Actor
- Years active: 1953–2010
- Spouse: Nancy Ann Dunkle (m. 1957)
- Children: 7

Philip Michael Bosco (September 26, 1930 – December 3, 2018) was an American actor. He was known for his Tony Award-winning performance as Saunders in the 1989 Broadway production of Lend Me a Tenor and for his starring role in the 2007 film The Savages. Bosco won a Daytime Emmy Award in 1988.

== Life and career ==
=== Early years ===
Philip Michael Bosco was born in Jersey City, New Jersey, on September 26, 1930, to Margaret Raymond (née Thek), a policewoman, and Philip Lupo Bosco, a carnival worker. His father was of Italian descent and his mother was of German descent. Bosco attended St. Peter's Preparatory School in Jersey City, and later studied drama at Catholic University of America, where he had notable success in the title role of William Shakespeare's Richard III.

=== Career ===
Bosco began his career in Broadway theatre and earned a Tony Award nomination for his debut in The Rape of the Belt in 1960. Bosco spent the next three decades supporting major stars in classic revivals like Cyrano de Bergerac, King Lear, and Twelfth Night.

Bosco appeared in revivals of plays by George Bernard Shaw, including Man and Superman, Saint Joan, Mrs. Warren's Profession, Major Barbara, Heartbreak House (opposite Rex Harrison), and You Never Can Tell, winning Tony nominations for the last three. Bosco also appeared with Shirley Knight in the Roundabout Theatre Company revival of Come Back, Little Sheba.

Following his Tony-winning performance in the farce Lend Me a Tenor in 1990, Bosco appeared on Broadway in An Inspector Calls (1994), The Heiress (1995), Twelfth Night (1998), Copenhagen (2000), and Twelve Angry Men (2004).

Bosco played Grandpa Potts in the 2005 Broadway production of Chitty Chitty Bang Bang, and played the aged Captain Shotover in a Broadway revival of Heartbreak House in 2006. He retired from the stage in 2009 after appearing in the City Center Encores production of Finian's Rainbow, although Bosco lent his voice to Douglas Carter Beane's 2010 play Mr. and Mrs. Fitch.

Bosco appeared regularly in the Law & Order television franchise, in roles ranging from judges to lawyers to villains. His motion picture credits include Trading Places, Working Girl, Children of a Lesser God, Suspect, Walls of Glass, Straight Talk, Nobody's Fool, Wonder Boys, The Money Pit, Three Men and a Baby, Milk Money, Quick Change, Angie, The First Wives Club, and The Savages.

Bosco narrated Ric Burns' 1991 documentary film Coney Island, and voiced a number of characters for Ken Burns' documentaries for PBS. He portrayed Vincenzo the butler in the 1995 comedy It Takes Two; and Walter Wallace, father of the bride-to-be, in the 1997 romantic comedy My Best Friend's Wedding, co-starring Julia Roberts, Cameron Diaz and Dermot Mulroney.

In 1988, Bosco won a Daytime Emmy Award for his appearance in the ABC Afterschool Special "Read Between The Lines". He was a series regular on the FX original series Damages. Bosco narrated Desert Giant: The World of the Saguaro Cactus by Barbara Bash on the PBS series Reading Rainbow in its sixty-second episode on March 27, 1990.

Bosco was inducted into the American Theater Hall of Fame in 1998.

=== Personal life and death ===
Bosco married a fellow Catholic University student, Nancy Ann Dunkle, on January 2, 1957. They had seven children and 15 grandchildren. Bosco and his wife resided in Haworth, New Jersey.

On December 3, 2018, Bosco died at his home of complications from dementia at age 88.

== Acting credits ==
=== Film ===
Year	Title	Role	Notes
1968	A Lovely Way to Die	Fuller	
1983	Trading Places	Doctor	
1984	The Pope of Greenwich Village	Paulie's Father	
1985	Heaven Help Us	Brother Paul	
1985	Walls of Glass	James Flanagan	
1986	The Money Pit	Curly	
1986	Children of a Lesser God	Dr. Curtis Franklin	
1987	Suspect	Paul Gray	
1987	Three Men and a Baby	Detective Melkowitz	
1988	Another Woman	Sam	
1988	Working Girl	Oren Trask	
1989	The Luckiest Man in the World	Sam Posner	
1989	The Dream Team	O'Malley	
1990	Blue Steel	Frank Turner	
1990	Quick Change	Bus Driver	
1991	True Colors	Sen. Frank Steubens	
1991	F/X2	Ray Silak	
1991	Shadows and Fog	Mr. Paulsen	
1992	Straight Talk	Gene Perlman	
1994	Angie	Frank	
1994	Milk Money	Jerry the Pope	
1994	Safe Passage	Mort	
1994	Nobody's Fool	Judge Flatt	
1995	It Takes Two	Vincenzo Campana	
1996	The First Wives Club	Uncle Carmine Morelli	
1996	Surprise!	Cabby	
1997	My Best Friend's Wedding	Walter Wallace	
1997	Deconstructing Harry	Professor Clark	
1997	Critical Care	Dr. Hofstader	
2000	Wonder Boys	Emily's Father	
2000	Shaft	Walter Wade, Sr.	
2000	Brooklyn Sonnet	Uncle Chicky	
2001	Kate & Leopold	Otis	
2002	Abandon	Professor Jergensen	
2005	Hitch	Mr. O'Brian	
2006	Freedomland	Priest	
2007	The Savages	Lenny Savage	

=== Television ===
Year	Title	Role	Notes
1953	You Are There	Sam Houston	2 episodes
1961	DuPont Show of the Month	Duke Michael	Episode: "The Prisoner of Zenda"
1961	Armstrong Circle Theatre	Roy Thornton	Episode: "Medicine Man"
1961	Sunday Showcase	General Gordon	Episode: "Our American Heritage: Gentleman's Decision"
1961	Our American Heritage	General Gordon	Episode: "Gentleman's Decision"
1963–1965	The Doctors and the Nurses	Ralph Maley / Hap Spencer / Parnell Sullivan	3 episodes
1965	The Defenders	Dr. Manfredi	Episode: "Whipping Boy"
1965	For the People	Detective Willard	2 episodes
1965	The Trials of O'Brien	Theo	Episode: "Charlie's Got All the Luck"
1966	Hawk	Nick Ingland	Episode: "Game with a Dead End"
1966	NET Playhouse	Peter Stockmann	Episode: "An Enemy of the People"
1968	N.Y.P.D.		Episode: "What's a Nice Girl Like You..."
1971	Great Performances	Father Coyne	Episode: "Hogan's Goat"
1978	Ryan's Hope	Dr. Gillette	Episode #1.789
1979	Guiding Light	Clarence Baily	Unknown episodes
1981	Nurse	Dr. Harry Wallenberg	Episode: "Equal Opportunity"
1985	American Playhouse	Gaetano Altobelli	Episode: "Some Men Need Help"
1986	Liberty	Boss William Tweed	Television film
1986	Rage of Angels: The Story Continues	Thomas Colfax	Television film
1986	The Equalizer	Brian Barclay	Episode: "Pretenders"
1987	ABC Afterschool Special	Grandfather	Episode: "Read Between the Lines"
1987	Leg Work	Dawson	Episode: "All This and a Gold Card Too"
1987	Echoes in the Darkness	Judge Garb	Television film
1988	Spenser: For Hire	David McVane	Episode: "Substantial Justice"
1988	Internal Affairs	John Wycoff	Television film
1989	The Equalizer	Oscar	Episode: "Heart of Justice"
1989	Murder in Black and White	Wycoff	Television film
1990	The Civil War	Horace Greeley	Voice, 9 episodes
1990	Against the Law	Judge Webb	Episode: "Contempt"
1990–1999	Law & Order	Gordon Schell / Lee Jerrold / Mr. Dobbs	5 episodes
1990–2010	American Experience	Narrator / various voices	3 episodes
1991	The Return of Eliot Ness	Art Malto	Television film
1992	Lincoln	Frederick Seward	Voice-, Television film
1993	Tribeca	Harry Arsharsky	7 episodes
1994	Against the Wall	Oswald	Television film
1994	The Forget-Me-Not Murders	Chief	Television film
1994	Janek: The Silent Betrayal	Chief Wycoff	Television film
1995	Young at Heart	Patsy	Television film
1997	Early Edition	Killabrew	Episode: "Bat Masterson"
1997	Remember WENN	Palermo Racine	Episode: "A Star in Stripes Forever"
1997	Liberty! The American Revolution	Benjamin Franklin	5 episodes
1998	Cosby		Episode: "Enter Lucas"
1998	Soul Man	Snake Eye	Episode: "Raising Heck"
1998	Carriers	Col. John O. Bailey	Television film
1998	Twelfth Night, or What You Will	Malvolio	Television film
1998	Spin City	Randall Winston, Sr.	Episode: "Gobble the Wonder Turkey Saves the Day"
1999	Bonanno: A Godfather's Story	Steve Maggadino Sr.	Television film
2000	All My Children	Lyle Wedgewood	1 episode
2000	Cupid & Cate	Dominic DeAngelo	Television film
2001	No Ordinary Baby	Dr. Ed Walden	Television film
2001–2004	Ed	Alan Stevens	2 episodes
2002	Cyberchase	Zeus	Voice, Episode: "Zeus on the Loose"
2002	Law & Order: Criminal Intent	Prof. Winthrop	Episode: "Anti-Thesis"
2002–2006	Law & Order: Special Victims Unit	Judge Joseph P. Terhune / Davis Langley	6 episodes
2003	Freedom: A History of Us		Voice, 7 episodes
2007–2009	Damages	Hollis Nye	12 episodes

=== Theater ===
Year	Title	Role	Notes
1958	Auntie Mame	Brian O'Bannion	Bus/Truck Tour
1960	Rape of the Belt	Heracles	Martin Beck Theatre; Tony Award nomination
1961	Donnybrook!	Will Danaher	46th Street Theatre
1961	A Man for All Seasons	understudy (The Duke of Norfolk, Attendant to Signor Chapuys, King Henry VIII)	ANTA Playhouse
1966	Richard III	performer	New York Shakespeare Festival
1967	The Alchemist	performer	Vivian Beaumont Theater
1967	The East Wind	performer	Vivian Beaumont Theater
1967	Galileo	performer	Vivian Beaumont Theater
1968	Saint Joan	Dunois	Vivian Beaumont Theater
1968	Tiger at the Gates	Hector	Vivian Beaumont Theater
1968	Cyrano de Bergerac	Le Comte de Guiche	Vivian Beaumont Theater
1968	King Lear	Earl of Kent	Vivian Beaumont Theater
1969	In the Matter of J. Robert Oppenheimer	Curtis Moffat, Jr.	Vivian Beaumont Theater
1969	The Miser	Anselme	Vivian Beaumont Theater
1969	The Time of Your Life	Nick	Vivian Beaumont Theater
1970	Camino Real	Baron de Charlus	Vivian Beaumont Theater
1970	Operation Sidewinder	Captain Bovine	Vivian Beaumont Theater
1970	The Good Woman of Setzuan	First God	Vivian Beaumont Theater
1971	Playboy of the Western World	Jimmy Farrell	Vivian Beaumont Theater
1971	An Enemy of the People	Peter Stockmann	Vivian Beaumont Theater
1971	Antigone	Creon	Vivian Beaumont Theater
1972	Narrow Road to the Deep North	Prime Minister	Vivian Beaumont Theater
1972	Twelfth Night	Antonio	Vivian Beaumont Theater
1972	The Crucible	Reverend John Hale	Vivian Beaumont Theater
1972	Enemies	Mikhail Skrobotov	Vivian Beaumont Theater
1973	The Plough and the Stars	Corporal Stoddart	Vivian Beaumont Theater
1973	The Merchant of Venice	Gratiano	Vivian Beaumont Theater
1973	A Streetcar Named Desire	Harold Mitchell	Vivian Beaumont Theater
1976	Mrs. Warren's Profession	Sir George Crofts	Vivian Beaumont Theater
1976	Henry V	Pistol	New York Shakespeare Festival
1977	The Threepenny Opera	Mack the Knife	New York Shakespeare Festival and Vivian Beaumont Theater
1977	Saint Joan	Richard de Beauchamp	Circle in the Square Theatre
1978	Stages	Frank Faye, New Member, Jesse Thibault	Belasco Theatre
1978	Man and Superman	Mendoza	Circle in the Square Theatre
1979	Whose Life Is It Anyway?	Dr. Michael Emerson	Trafalgar Theatre (New York)
1980	Major Barbara	Andrew Undershaft	Circle in the Square Theatre; Drama Desk Award nomination
1980	The Bacchae	Cadmus	Circle in the Square Theatre
1982	Eminent Domain	Holmes Bradford	Circle in the Square Theatre
1983	The Caine Mutiny Court-Martial	Lt. Com. Philip Francis Queeg	Circle in the Square Theatre
1983	Heartbreak House	Alfred "Boss" Mangan	Circle in the Square Theatre; Tony Award nomination
1983	Ah, Wilderness!	Nat Miller	Haft Theater
1984	Come Back, Little Sheba	Doc	Roundabout Theatre Company
1985	The Loves of Anatol	Max	Circle in the Square Theatre
1986	You Never Can Tell	Waiter	Circle in the Square Theatre; Tony Award nomination
1988	The Devil's Disciple	General Burgoyne	Circle in the Square Theatre
1989	Lend Me a Tenor	Saunders	Royale Theatre; Tony Award; Drama Desk Award
1990	The Miser	Harpagon	Circle in the Square Theatre
1994	Fiorello!	Ben Marino	Encores!
1994	An Inspector Calls	Arthur Birling	Royale Theatre
1995	The Heiress	Dr. Austin Sloper	Cort Theatre; Drama Desk Award nomination
1995	Moon Over Buffalo	George Hay	Martin Beck Theatre; Tony Award nomination
1998	Strike Up the Band	Horace J. Fletcher	Encores!
1998	Twelfth Night	Malvolio	Vivian Beaumont Theater
1999	Ancestral Voices	Eddie's grandfather	Mitzi E. Newhouse Theatre
2000	Copenhagen	Niels Bohr	Royale Theatre
2001	Bloomer Girl	Horatio Applegate	Encores!
2002	Carousel	Starkeeper	Carnegie Hall
2004	Twelve Angry Men	Juror No. 3	American Airlines Theatre; Tony Award nomination Drama Desk Award nomination
2006	Chitty Chitty Bang Bang	Grandpa Potts	Hilton Theatre
2006	Heartbreak House	Captain Shotover	American Airlines Theatre
2007	Follies	Dmitri Weissman	Encores!
2009	Finian's Rainbow	Senator Billboard Rawkins	Encores!
