= The Money Pit =

1986 film by Richard Benjamin

- Theatrical release poster
- Directed by: Richard Benjamin
- Written by: David Giler
- Based on: Mr. Blandings Builds His Dream House by Melvin Frank; Norman Panama
- Produced by: Kathleen Kennedy; Art Levinson; Frank Marshall
- Starring: Tom Hanks; Shelley Long; Alexander Godunov; Maureen Stapleton
- Cinematography: Gordon Willis
- Edited by: Jacqueline Cambas
- Music by: Michel Colombier
- Production company: Amblin Entertainment
- Distributed by: Universal Pictures
- Release date: March 26, 1986 (United States)
- Running time: 91 minutes
- Country: United States
- Language: English
- Budget: $18.4 million
- Box office: $55 million

The Money Pit is a 1986 American comedy film directed by Richard Benjamin and starring Tom Hanks and Shelley Long as Walter Fielding and Anna Crowley, a couple who attempt to renovate a recently purchased house. The film is a loose remake of the 1948 Cary Grant comedy film Mr. Blandings Builds His Dream House, and was filmed in New York City and Lattingtown, New York. It was co-executive produced by Steven Spielberg.

== Plot ==
Attorney Walter Fielding and his classical musician girlfriend, Anna Crowley, learn that Walter's father, Walter Sr., has married a woman named Florinda, having fled the country after embezzling millions of dollars from their musician clients. The next morning, they are told they need to vacate the apartment they are subletting from Anna's ex-husband, Max Beissart, a self-absorbed conductor who has returned early from Europe.

Through an unscrupulous realtor friend Jack Schnittman, Walter learns about a million-dollar distress sale mansion on the market for just $200,000. He and Anna meet the owner, Estelle, who claims that she must sell it quickly because her husband, Carlos, has been arrested. Her sob story and insistence at keeping the place in candlelight in order to save money "for the bloodsucking lawyers" distracts Walter and enchants Anna, who finds it romantic. They decide to buy it, on the belief that the process of restoring the house will cement their relationship.

However, as soon as Walter and Anna take possession of the house, it begins to fall apart. The entire front door frame rips out of the wall, the main staircase collapses, the plumbing is full of sewage and the electrical system catches fire. Contractors Art and Brad Shirk summarily tear the house to pieces using Walter's $5,000 down payment, leaving him and Anna embroiled in bureaucracy to secure the necessary building permits to complete the work. Walter's continuing frustration at the escalating costs of restoring the house leads him to brand it a "money pit", while the Shirks continue to assure him that their work will take "two weeks".

The repair work continues for four months, and Walter and Anna realize they need more money to complete the renovations. She attempts to secure additional funds from Max by selling him some artwork she received in their divorce. Although he does not care for it, he agrees to its purchase. He wines and dines her, and the next morning, when she wakes up in his bed, he allows her to believe that she has cheated on Walter; in reality, Max slept on the couch. Walter later asks her point-blank if she slept with Max, but she pushes back, equivocates and finally denies it. His suspicions push her to admit that she did so.

Due to Walter and Anna's stubbornness, their relationship breaks down. They vow to sell the house once it is restored and split the proceeds. This nearly happens, but Max, seeing how miserable the two of them are, confesses his lie to Anna, and also tells Walter that he would be a fool to give up on Anna in this way. Once the house has been completely restored, Walter admits to Anna that he misses her and says he loves her even if she did sleep with Max. She happily tells him that in fact she did not, and they reconcile. In the end, they are married in front of the newly repaired house.

Meanwhile, Estelle and her husband/partner-in-crime, Carlos – now revealed to be con artists – resurface in Brazil, where they meet with Walter Sr. and new bride Florinda to sell them an old house they claim to have lived in for several years - implying that similar troubles are going to happen to them.

== Cast ==
- Tom Hanks as Walter Fielding, Jr.
- Shelley Long as Anna Crowley
- Alexander Godunov as Max Beissart
- Maureen Stapleton as Estelle
- Joe Mantegna as Art Shirk
- Philip Bosco as Curly
- Frankie Faison as James
- Josh Mostel as Jack Schnittman
- Billy Lombardo as Benny
- Joe Ponazecki as Montgomery Shrapp
- Yakov Smirnoff as Shatov
- Carmine Caridi as Brad Shirk
- Brian Backer as Ethan
- Mike Starr as Lenny
- Mia Dillon as Marika
- John van Dreelen as Carlos
- Douglass Watson as Walter Fielding, Sr.
- Tetchie Agbayani as Florinda Fielding
- Michael Jeter as Arnie
- Afemo Omilami as Bernie

Additionally, Wendell Pierce appears as a paramedic assisting Schnittman and Nestor Serrano appears as one of the handymen.

== Production ==
Kathleen Turner was originally offered the role of Anna Crowley, but she declined in favor of The Jewel of the Nile.

Principal photography began on April 29, 1985, and initially ended on August 5, 1985.

Exterior shots used a relatively rundown house in Lattingtown, Long Island that had been built in 1898 in the Colonial style. After the film, it was purchased for $2.1 million in 2002. In November 2019, the Seattle PI reported that the Long Island house had "finally" sold for around $3.5 million, at a significant loss in relation to renovation costs.

Over Thanksgiving 1985, a new opening was shot on the Universal Studios lot.

The production designer, Patrizia Von Brandenstein, won the Academy Award for Art Direction for her work on Amadeus (1984) shortly before production began on The Money Pit. The nature of the action in dictated that the scenes be shot in order. The house sets were also built as modules that could easily be disassembled. Although Roger Ebert's review of the film was generally negative, he noted it was "a triumph of art direction. The Hollywood artisans who designed it deserve some sort of medal for the neat stunts they think up and the great tricks they’re able to pull. There is even one sustained Rube Goldberg-type gag that is really funny, as an incredible chain of events unfolds with meticulous precision."

== Reception ==
On the review aggregator website Rotten Tomatoes, 52% of 23 critics' reviews are positive, with an average rating of 5.0/10. Metacritic, which uses a weighted average, assigned the film a score of 49 out of 100, based on 14 critics, indicating "mixed or average" reviews. Audiences surveyed by CinemaScore gave the film an average grade of "C+" on a scale of A+ to F.

Roger Ebert gave The Money Pit only one out of four stars, calling the film "one monotonous sight gag after another." Ebert's colleague Gene Siskel likewise gave it one out of four stars, describing the film as "miserable" and an "abject failure." He criticized Tom Hanks for being "his usual smug self" and Shelley Long for being more cute than she was funny. Both Siskel and Vincent Canby of The New York Times said that the movie's approach to slapstick comedy suffered from the same problems that Steven Spielberg's 1941 did. They also agreed that Alexander Godunov's supporting role was the funniest part of the movie.

The film is a remake of the 1948 Cary Grant comedy Mr. Blandings Builds His Dream House, a fact that was pointed out by multiple critics.

== Home media ==
The film was released on DVD by Universal Pictures Home Entertainment in 2003, and later re-released in 2011 as part of a three-film set, the Tom Hanks Comedy Favorites Collection, along with The 'Burbs and Dragnet.

The film was released on Blu-ray on August 16, 2016.

The film was released on 4K Ultra HD Blu-ray on June 30, 2026.

== Adaptations ==
Drömkåken, a remake of The Money Pit directed by Peter Dalle, was released to cinemas in Sweden on 28 October 1993.

In 2013 NBC announced they were developing a TV series based on the film, but the project was later put on hold.
