= Alain Bernheim (producer) =

American film producer

- Born: October 5, 1922; Paris, France
- Died: October 2, 2009 (aged 86)
- Citizenship: American
- Occupations: Film producer, literary agent

Alain Bernheim (October 5, 1922 – October 2, 2009) was a French-born American film producer and literary agent whose film credits include Buddy Buddy and Racing with the Moon. He died on October 2, 2009, at age 86.

== Biography ==
Alain Bernheim was born in 1922 in Paris. In 2001, he was made a Chevalier de la Légion d'Honneur for his contributions to American-French cultural relations and his service in the World War II.
