= Downtown (film) =

1990 American police action comedy film directed by Richard Benjamin

- Theatrical movie poster
- Directed by: Richard Benjamin
- Written by: Nat Mauldin
- Produced by: Charles H. Maguire
- Starring: Anthony Edwards; Forest Whitaker; Penelope Ann Miller; Joe Pantoliano
- Cinematography: Richard H. Kline
- Edited by: Jacqueline Cambas; Brian L. Chambers
- Music by: Alan Silvestri
- Distributed by: 20th Century Fox
- Release date: January 12, 1990
- Running time: 96 minutes
- Country: United States
- Language: English
- Budget: $10,000,000 (estimated)
- Box office: $2,346,150

Downtown is a 1990 American buddy cop action comedy film directed by Richard Benjamin. The film starred Anthony Edwards, Forest Whitaker, Penelope Ann Miller and Joe Pantoliano.

== Plot ==
Police Officer Alex Kearney is a patrolman in Bryn Mawr, an affluent, plush suburb of Philadelphia—until he stops an important businessman and his account of the incident is not believed. As punishment, he is assigned to work Downtown, considered the most dangerous, high-crime precinct in the city. Everyone at the precinct is certain that the 'by the book' suburban, pampered cop is going to get himself (and whoever is assigned as his partner), killed.

Sergeant Dennis Curren draws the unfortunate 'babysitting' assignment. However, when Alex's best friend is killed investigating a stolen car, Alex throws the book out the window tracking down the killer.

== Cast ==
- Anthony Edwards as Officer Alex Kearney
- Forest Whitaker as Sergeant Dennis Curren
- Penelope Ann Miller as Lori Mitchell
- Joe Pantoliano as White
- David Clennon as Jerome Sweet
- Art Evans as Henry Coleman
- Rick Aiello as Mickey Witlin
- Roger Aaron Brown as Lieutenant Sam Parral
- Ron Canada as Lowell Harris
- Wanda De Jesus as Luisa Diaz
- Francis X. McCarthy as Inspector Ben Glass (credited as Frank McCarthy)
- Kimberly Scott as Christine Curren
- Danuel Pipoly as Skip Markowitz
- Ron Taylor as Bruce Tucker
- Vinnie Curto as Mr. Lopez

== Production ==
This was the theatrical debut of scriptwriter Nat Mauldin, a writer on Barney Miller and a writer-producer of Night Court.

Principal photography began 17 April 1989, according to the 19 April 1989 Daily Variety and 25 April 1989 Hollywood Reporter, with a scheduled wrap date of 30 June 1989.

Though the plot of the movie references a Philadelphia suburb, Bryn Mawr, most of the exterior filming is done within the City of Philadelphia. The beginning of the film features Cresheim Valley Road, Stenton, and Germantown Avenues. This is in the Mount Airy and Chestnut Hill neighborhoods.

There are a few early scenes that are filmed in and around Los Angeles. The scene where Anthony Edwards pretends to pull over Penelope Ann Miller is filmed on Yale Street, in Claremont, CA. Later portions of the film are in the Fairhill and Norris Square neighborhoods which are now known as "The Badlands" circa 2000. Diamond Street is within this area, but Philadelphia police districts are numbered, not named for streets or neighborhoods.

Locations

- Philadelphia, Pennsylvania
- La Canada, California ("Bryn Mawr")
- Claremont, California
- Pasadena, California
- University Park, Los Angeles ("Dennis Curren's" home)
- Los Angeles, California
- Ports O' Call in San Pedro, California
- Woodland Hills, California (the "Sweet" estate)
- stage 6 at the Warner Center in Woodland Hills, California
- stage 14 at the Warner Center in Woodland Hills, California

== Reception ==
The film received mostly negative reviews. Hal Hinson of The Washington Post called the film racist for picturing "the inner city as an all-black criminal hell-town where the men who walk the streets are much less human than the people in the all-white suburbs." David Nusair of Reel Films called it "[r]elentlessly bland and hopelessly unfunny."

On 13 January 1990, Washington Post called it "just a B-grade movie, aimed at the lowest common entertainment denominator". On 16 January 1990, Chicago Tribune wrote "lurches crudely and disruptively between sitcom flippancy, sickening violence, cartoonish physical comedy and oozing sentimentality." On 17 January 1990, USA Today wrote "derivative, dull, dopey, degrading, dumb, deplorable", and panned Anthony Edwards as "so bland he makes Wonder Bread look funky"

"the wimp starts to toughen up, while the rebel becomes a sensitive, sharing, family man" — Adrian Martin, November 1992.

"cluttered, with too much noise on the soundtrack and too much aimless, frenetic and at times ugly action" — Janet Maslin, January 1990.

"crass uptown film about downtown" – Dennis Schwartz Reviews.
