= Murder of Barbara Kendhammer =

2016 murder in Wisconsin

- Location: 43.934887°N 91.119840°W; West Salem, Wisconsin, U.S.
- Date: September 16, 2016; 10 years ago c. 8:00 am (CDT; UTC−05:00)
- Attack type: Homicide by blunt trauma
- Victim: Barbara Carol Kendhammer
- Perpetrator: Todd Allen Kendhammer
- Motive: Unknown
- Verdict: Guilty
- Convictions: First-degree intentional homicide
- Sentence: Life imprisonment with the possibility of parole after 30 years

On September 16, 2016, 46-year-old Barbara Carol Kendhammer (née Adams; March 4, 1970) was beaten to death by her husband, Todd Allen Kendhammer (born March 16, 1970), in West Salem, Wisconsin.

== Background ==
Todd and Barbara Kendhammer met as teenagers and had been married for 25 years at the time of Barbara's death. They had two children, Jessica (born 1992) and Jordan (born 1994), who reported that their parents were "still very much in love" and had no marital conflicts.

== Incident ==
At around 7:44 am on September 16, Todd and Barbara departed their West Salem home in their Toyota Camry, first driving up to a neighbor's home a minute away. They left the neighbor's home at around 7:49 am, driving south towards Barbara's workplace at the West Salem Middle School. At around 7:52 am, the Toyota began driving west and later north, in the opposite direction from the middle school. At around 8:05 am, the car wound up in a ditch; Todd called 911 to report that a pipe fell off a passing truck going in the opposite direction and struck Barbara in the head and throat through the windshield as they were driving on a rural West Salem road. When the police arrived, Todd explained that he and Barbara were driving to pick up a truck belonging to his friend Justin Heim that needed windshield replacement work (which Todd did as a side job), and that she was planning to use their car to then go to work.

After Todd and first responders unsuccessfully attempted CPR on Barbara at the scene, she was rushed to the hospital, where she died the next day of her injuries.

== Investigation ==
First responders found that Todd had injuries on his hand and scratches on his neck and chest, which he explained as arising from him punching the windshield as he saw the pipe coming and from working with glass as a hobby. Investigators believed Todd was lying, and that his injuries were caused by a physical struggle with Barbara. They also interviewed Heim, who stated that he didn't have a truck that needed windshield repair. An eyewitness later testified at Todd's trial that he drove past the Kendhammers' Toyota while it was in the ditch and did not see any signs of its windshield being broken nor any people nearby.

Police obtained video footage from a ranch along the road where the Kendhammers were travelling before the alleged accident. They identified a car that resembled the Kendhammers' Toyota driving north, but did not observe a truck driving south afterwards.

On September 20, an autopsy was performed on Barbara. The medical examiner, Dr. Kathleen McCubbin, ruled that the cause of death was blunt impact injuries to the head and neck, and that the pattern of the injuries were inconsistent with Todd's account of a pipe striking Barbara.

On September 22, Todd was interrogated by investigators Fritz Leinfelder and Mark Yehle. He admitted that he didn't know where Heim lived and changed his story, claiming that he was actually going to the home of Heim's acquaintance, who would later state that he too was not expecting Todd or in need of a windshield replacement. Investigators began suspecting Todd due to his inability to maintain a consistent alibi.

== Legal proceedings ==
Todd was arrested in December 2016 and charged with first-degree intentional homicide. The case went to trial in December 2017, with Todd pleading not guilty.

The prosecution, led by Tim Gruenke, argued that Todd had beaten Barbara to death and staged the scene by breaking his car's windshield with the pipe, highlighting that some of Barbara's injuries (including a cricoid fracture) were consistent with a beating and strangulation, and that the multiple strikes on the Toyota's windshield could not have occurred from the pipe falling off the truck and striking the windshield a single time. Todd was represented by Stephen Hurley, who maintained his story about the purpose of the drive, though mentioned that it was to see an associate of a different co-worker. The defense also maintained the claim of the pipe rolling off the truck and striking the car, which were corroborated by a biomechanics expert and a glass expert. Todd testified in his defense, explaining that he lied in his interrogation due to being emotionally distraught and not being in the "right state of mind".

The trial lasted for 9 days, ending with the jury convicting Todd Kendhammer of first-degree intentional homicide. He was sentenced by judge Todd Bjerke to life in prison with the possibility of parole after 30 years. Todd Kendhammer maintained his innocence and was supported by his children.

== Aftermath ==
In June 2024, Todd filed an appeal for a new trial based on ineffective counsel in the initial trial and additional evidence and forensic testimony regarding the pipe's trajectory, but it was rejected by a state court of appeals. On October 18, 2024, the Wisconsin Supreme Court denied a request to review his conviction.
