= Sante Kimes =

American multiple murderer, slaver (1934–2014)

- NYS DOCS mugshot (2000)
- Born: Sante Louise Singhrs; July 24, 1934; Oklahoma City, Oklahoma, U.S.
- Died: May 19, 2014 (aged 79); Bedford Hills Correctional Facility for Women, Bedford Hills, New York, U.S.
- Occupations: Con artist, fraudster
- Spouses: Edward Walker (m. 1957; div. 1969) Kenneth Kimes (m. 1981; died 1994)
- Children: 2
- Motive: Financial
- Convictions: Murder (2 counts), robbery, slavery, forgery, over 100 other charges
- Penalty: Life imprisonment without the possibility of parole

Sante Kimes (née Singhrs; July 24, 1934 – May 19, 2014), also known as the Dragon Lady, was an American murderer, con artist, robber, fraudster, serial arsonist and suspected serial killer. Her decades-long crime spree – including throughout her marriage to her second husband, millionaire Kenneth Kimes Sr. – was briefly paused starting in 1985 when she served three years in prison on a conviction of slavery, and eventually ended with her arrest for the 1998 murder of Irene Silverman in New York City. Many of these crimes were committed with the assistance of her son, Kenneth Kimes Jr. In 2000, both were tried and convicted together on 118 charges, including the murder of Silverman.

In 2004, Kenneth Jr. made a plea deal in the 1998 murder of David Kazdin in Los Angeles, agreeing to testify against his mother in exchange for neither facing the death penalty. Sante was subsequently convicted of the Kazdin murder. The pair were also suspected of but never charged in a third murder in the Bahamas, to which Kenneth Jr. later confessed. Sante also admitted to her son that she murdered the partner in one of her arsons, Elmer Ambrose Holmgren, who had disappeared in Costa Rica; no charges were brought in this crime.

== Early life and criminal history ==
Sante Kimes was born Sante Louise Singhrs in Oklahoma City, Oklahoma, on July 24, 1934, the third of four children born to Illinois native of Dutch ancestry Mary Gertrude (née Van Horn; 1897–1969) and herbalist Prama Mahendra "Doc" Singhrs (1889–1940). Sante's father had emigrated from the Indian region of Punjab by way of Canada. She had three siblings: an older brother and sister, and one younger sister. As a teenager, Sante would go by the name "Sandra."

Sante would later falsely claim that her father left the family when she was three years old and that her mother became a prostitute. In reality, Sante's father died from heart disease when she was five years old. According to her younger sister, Retha, Sante had an incestuous relationship with their brother, Carl (Karam), and was a pyromaniac who held lit matches underneath Retha's fingers against her will. As a child, Sante would tie up the goats and dogs on her family's farm and use hatpins to mutilate and torture them.

When she was a teenager, Sante moved with her mother and younger sister to Los Angeles. There she was allegedly adopted by Edwin and Mary Chambers, along with another boy. She moved with her new family to Carson City, Nevada, where she graduated from Carson High School in 1952. At school, Sante earned a reputation as a bully who frequently belittled and intimidated younger students.

In 1956, Sante reunited with a former boyfriend from high school, Edward Walker. They married the following year and had one son, Kent Walker. After a 1961 shoplifting conviction in Sacramento, Sante separated and reconciled intermittently with Walker, but their divorce was not finalized until 1969.

Walker was a general contractor who built houses in the Sacramento area; in December 1960, Sante set fire to a house he had built in order to fraudulently collect insurance. She only destroyed the kitchen and received US$10,000 (equivalent to $109,000 in 2025). Over the course of their marriage, dozens of houses that Walker had supervised burned down, and Sante had a number of affairs with his wealthy business associates. After her first divorce, Sante and Kent travelled to Palm Springs, California.

In 1971, Sante met Kenneth Keith Kimes Sr., a motel tycoon seventeen years her senior, after reading about his divorce in a magazine article and learning that he had a net worth of approximately $20 million (equivalent to $122 million in 2025). The couple would eventually marry in Clark County, Nevada, on April 5, 1981. They had one son, Kenneth Kimes Jr., who was born on March 24, 1975.

Sante spent the better part of her life fleecing people of money, expensive merchandise and real estate, either through arson, elaborate con games, forgery or outright theft. She committed insurance fraud on numerous occasions, frequently by committing arson and then collecting money for property damage. She also frequently introduced Kenneth Sr. as an ambassador, a ploy that even gained the couple access to a White House reception during the Ford Administration. She sometimes impersonated Elizabeth Taylor, whom she resembled slightly.

Sante committed many acts of fraud that were not even financially necessary, such as enslaving maids when she could easily afford to pay them. She frequently offered young, homeless undocumented immigrants housing and employment, then kept them as virtual prisoners by threatening to report them to immigration authorities if they did not follow her orders. As a result, Sante and Kenneth Sr. spent years squandering his fortune on lawyers' fees, defending themselves against charges of slavery.

Sante was eventually arrested in August 1985 and was sentenced by the United States District Court to five years' imprisonment for violating federal anti-slavery laws, and was successfully sued by Honolulu civil attorney David Schutter in civil court. Kenneth Sr. took a plea bargain and agreed to complete an alcohol treatment program. He and Kenneth Jr. lived a reasonably normal life until Sante was released from prison in 1989. Kenneth Sr. died of a brain aneurysm in 1994.

== Murders ==
=== Elmer Holmgren ===
On September 18, 1990, Sante hired 59-year-old lawyer Elmer Ambrose Holmgren to burn her Honolulu home due to a lien on the property, and the fact it would have cost US$900,000 (equivalent to $2.22 million in 2025) to sell it. Insurance investigators interviewed Holmgren, who admitted his involvement in the arson. On October 24, Sante burned Holmgren's office because he possessed a number of legal documents related to the case which would have incriminated her.

Before a case could be brought to trial, Holmgren told his family that he was taking a trip to Costa Rica with Sante and Kenneth Sr. on August 2, 1991. He was not seen again after this. In his memoir, Son of a Grifter, Kent Walker stated his mother and Kenneth Kimes Sr. admitted to him during a 1992 argument they had killed Holmgren. Stating Sante hit him in the head with a hammer in a car, while she rode in the backseat, he rode in the front passenger's seat, and Kimes Sr. drove.

Holmgren's body was recovered from a dumpster in Inglewood, California, on February 19, 1991, exhibiting multiple blunt traumatic injuries to the head, but was not identified until 2026. No charges have been brought against any member of the Kimes family in connection with his death.

=== Syed Bilal Ahmed ===
Kenneth Jr. also confessed to murdering 46-year-old banker Syed Bilal Ahmed, who was in charge of Sante's offshore bank accounts, in Nassau, Bahamas, on September 4, 1996, which had been suspected by Bahamian authorities at the time. He testified that the two acted together to drug Ahmed, drown him in a bathtub and dump his body offshore, but no charges were ever filed in that case. Sante denied any involvement in or knowledge of the murders, and she claimed that Kenneth Jr. confessed solely to avoid receiving the death penalty.

=== David Kazdin ===
David Kazdin, aged 63, had allowed Sante to use his name on the deed of a home in Las Vegas that was actually occupied by her and Kenneth Sr. in the 1970s. Several years later, Sante convinced a notary to forge Kazdin's signature on a loan application for $280,000 (equivalent to $553,000 in 2025), with the house as collateral. When Kazdin discovered the forgery through a letter sent from his bank and threatened to expose Sante, she ordered Kenneth Jr. to kill him. On March 9, 1998, Kenneth Jr. murdered Kazdin in his Los Angeles home by shooting him in the back of the head. According to another accomplice's later testimony, all three participated in disposing of the evidence. Kazdin's body was found in a dumpster near Los Angeles International Airport (LAX) in March 1998. The murder weapon was never recovered, having been disassembled and dropped into a storm sewer.

=== Irene Silverman ===
Former ballerina and socialite Irene Zambelli Silverman, aged 82, was last seen at her townhouse on East 65th Street in New York City on July 5, 1998. Kenneth Jr. was a tenant in Silverman's mansion at the time she went missing, having moved into one of her apartments the previous month using an alias.

Authorities arrested Sante and Kenneth Jr. on the day of Silverman's disappearance with the initial charges stemming from a fraudulent check written in Utah for $14,900 (equivalent to $29,000 in 2025) earlier in 1998; they were charged with Silverman's murder in December 1998 and convicted in 2000. Authorities believe mother and son devised a scheme whereby Sante would assume the identity of Silverman and appropriate ownership of her mansion, which was valued at $7.7 million (equivalent to $13.1 million in 2025). The pair recorded Silverman's phone conversations and kept a set of fifteen notebooks on which Sante had written detailed descriptions of mortgage fraud schemes involving many intended victims, including both Silverman and Kazdin.

When he was arrested, Kenneth Jr. had in his possession Silverman's keys, cassettes of her tape-recorded calls, loaded firearms, wigs, masks, plastic handcuffs, $30,000 in cash (equivalent to $59,000 in 2025), an empty stun gun box and a substance similar to a "date rape" drug. He also held a forged deed which approved the transfer of Silverman's multi-million dollar townhouse to Sante's shell corporation for $395,000 (equivalent to $780,000 in 2025). During the trial for Kazdin's murder, Kenneth Jr. confessed that after his mother had used a stun gun on Silverman, he strangled her, stuffed her corpse into a bag and deposited it in a dumpster in Hoboken, New Jersey.

== Investigation and arrest ==
The investigation into the Kimes family officially began on March 14, 1998, when Kazdin's remains were found in a dumpster near LAX. The Federal Bureau of Investigation (FBI) and Los Angeles Police Department (LAPD) detectives assigned to the investigation focused on the mortgage application with the forged signature that falsely linked Kazdin to a house in Las Vegas which had been partly burned down in an attempted arson. The supposed homeowner turned out to be David McCarran, a homeless man who said Sante and Kenneth Jr. had lit the arson fire. He also claimed to have been forced to stay in the house by the Kimes family, who hoped to collect the insurance money from the loss of the house.

Investigators also located Stan Patterson, a second man who confessed to selling a handgun to Kenneth Jr. which he used to kill Kazdin. He was told of several potential felony charges stemming from the murder and mortgage fraud, and reluctantly agreed to cooperate with police in apprehending the pair to avoid prosecution. At the end of June 1998, Patterson got a call from Sante about an expensive townhouse in New York's Upper West Side she wanted to sell, and she needed his help with the paperwork. Patterson agreed to meet her in New York on July 5. He informed the FBI about the scheduled meeting before he left on July 3. Two days later, Patterson met Sante at the New York Hilton around 6 PM that evening. Around 7 PM, Kenneth Jr. arrived at the Hilton and approached Sante. Upon his appearance FBI and New York City Police Department (NYPD) officers arrested both of them.

== Trials, imprisonment and death ==
The Kimeses first trial was in New York, for the Silverman murder and its extended list of associated crimes. Evidence recovered from their car helped establish the case for trying them for Kazdin's murder as well. The Silverman trial was unusual in many aspects, namely the fact that no body was ever recovered. Nonetheless, the jury voted unanimously – on their first poll – to convict Sante and Kenneth Jr. not only of murder but of 117 other charges including robbery, burglary, conspiracy, grand larceny, illegal weapons possession, forgery and eavesdropping.

The judge also took the unusual step of ordering Sante not to speak to the media even after the jury had been sequestered, as a result of her passing a note to New York Times reporter David Rhode in court. He threatened to have Sante handcuffed during further court appearances if she persisted and restricted her telephone access to calls to her lawyers. The judge contended that Sante was attempting to influence the jury as they may have seen or heard any such interviews, and that there would be no cross-examination as there would be in court. Sante had earlier chosen to not take the stand in her own defense after the judge ruled that prosecutors could question her about her previous convictions, including her prison time on her slavery conviction.

During the sentencing portion of the Silverman trial, Sante made a prolonged statement to the court blaming the authorities, including the Kimeses lawyers, for framing her and her son. She went on to compare their trial to the Salem Witch Trials and claimed that the prosecutors were guilty of "murdering the Constitution" before the judge told her to be quiet. When the statement was concluded, the judge responded that Sante was a sociopath and a degenerate, and that her son was a dupe and a "remorseless predator", before imposing the maximum sentence on both of them. This amounted to 120 years for Sante and 124 years for her son, effectively sentencing both of them to life imprisonment.

In October 2000, while doing a prison interview, Kenneth Jr. held Court TV reporter Maria Zone hostage by pressing a ballpoint pen into her throat. Zone had interviewed Kenneth Jr. in prison once before without incident. His demand was that his mother not be extradited to California, where the two faced the death penalty for the murder of Kazdin. After four hours of negotiation, Zone broke free when Kenneth Jr. removed the pen from her throat for a moment. Negotiators had created a distraction which allowed them to quickly remove Zone and wrestle Kenneth Jr. to the ground.

In March 2001, Kenneth Jr. was extradited to Los Angeles to stand trial for the murder of Kazdin. Sante was extradited to Los Angeles in June 2001. During that trial in June 2004, Kenneth Jr. changed his plea to "guilty" and implicated his mother in Kazdin's murder in exchange for a plea deal that he not receive the death penalty and neither would his mother if she was convicted. He then testified in trial against his mother, exposing every detail about their multiple crimes and describing how she indoctrinated him into becoming her accomplice.

Sante again made a prolonged statement denying the murders and accusing police and prosecutors of various kinds of misconduct, and she was again eventually ordered by the presiding judge to be silent. The judge in the Kazdin case called Sante "one of the most evil individuals" she had encountered in her time on the bench. Sante was returned to New York state to continue serving her first murder conviction. Sante was primarily housed in solitary confinement for the duration of her imprisonment. During her incarceration, Sante appointed family friend Bryan Johnson, who is based in North Carolina, to serve as her Power of Attorney and her sole intermediary with the outside world. In the book "Evil and Son," writer John Marquis stated, "Mr. Johnson's ongoing efforts on the Kimeses behalf are admirable, not only for their sheer doggedness in the face of such high-powered opposition, but also for their diligence and efficiency. He is in contact with all of the Kimes' former attorneys, collecting papers and other evidence in support of a 440 retrial motion." Johnson worked for years with various attorneys collecting evidence and compiling a file to assist Sante to obtain a re-trial, however, Sante died before a re-trial was obtained Sante died of natural causes at the Bedford Hills Correctional Facility for Women on May 19, 2014. Kenneth Jr. is currently incarcerated at Richard J. Donovan Correctional Facility in San Diego, California.

== In media ==
The 2001 made-for-TV movie, A Most Deadly Family, starred Mary Tyler Moore as Sante, Gabriel Olds as Kenneth Jr. and Jean Stapleton as Silverman. In 2006, another TV movie based on a book about the case, A Little Thing Called Murder, starring Judy Davis and Jonathan Jackson, aired on Lifetime. Sante was also featured in a 2009 episode of the television show Dateline and a 2015 episode of Diabolical Women. Kimes is also the subject of the novel Depraved Indifference by Gary Indiana.

== See also ==
- List of murder convictions without a body
- List of serial killers in the United States
