= Racing with the Moon =

1984 film by Richard Benjamin

- Theatrical release poster
- Directed by: Richard Benjamin
- Written by: Steve Kloves
- Produced by: Alain Bernheim; John Kohn
- Starring: Sean Penn; Elizabeth McGovern; Nicolas Cage
- Cinematography: John Bailey
- Edited by: Jacqueline Cambas
- Music by: Dave Grusin
- Distributed by: Paramount Pictures
- Release date: March 23, 1984
- Running time: 108 minutes
- Country: United States
- Language: English
- Budget: $6.5 million
- Box office: $6,045,657

Racing with the Moon is a 1984 American drama film directed by Richard Benjamin, written by Steve Kloves, and starring Sean Penn, Elizabeth McGovern and Nicolas Cage. The original music score was composed by Dave Grusin. The film's title derives from the 1941 hit song of the same name by Vaughn Monroe.

In 2013, source music and elements of Grusin's score from the film were issued as additional tracks on the CD release of Grusin's music for the soundtrack of Heaven Can Wait. The love theme, "A Secret Place", also appears on two Grusin recordings, Night Lines and Now Playing, as well as being the title track of a Grover Washington, Jr. release with Grusin playing piano on the session.

== Plot ==
In 1940s Mendocino County, Henry "Hopper" Nash is a small town boy who has been drafted into the U.S. Marine Corps and is about to serve overseas. He is close friends with Nicky, who is also about to be deployed. They have approximately six weeks before shipping out.

Henry and Nicky work together at the bowling alley setting pins, buffing lanes, and working the front counter. Henry sees Caddie Winger at the movie theater taking tickets. He is immediately smitten and conspires with a younger boy to give her flowers. Caddie comes to the soda shop where Henry and Nicky are hanging out. Henry jumps over the counter and pretends that he is working. He follows Caddie to her home and discovers that she lives in an elaborate mansion. He assumes that she is a "Gatsby girl" and is therefore rich. As it turns out, Caddie lives there because her mother is a maid. Later, Henry sees Caddie working at the library. He attempts to get her name but she rebuffs him. At the soda shop, Caddie sets Henry up with one of her friends. Henry meets the others at the skating rink and pretends that he knows how to skate. He ends up crashing but in doing so is able to steal some time with Caddie. She agrees to go on a date with Henry and the two quickly become an item.

Meanwhile, Nicky's girlfriend, Sally Kaiser, is pregnant with his child. He attempts to get $150 from Henry for an abortion. Henry asks Caddie, whom he assumes can easily afford it. Caddie, in an effort to avoid letting Henry down, attempts to steal a pearl necklace from Alice, a young woman who lives at the house at which Caddie resides. She is caught and confesses the reason she needs the necklace. She ends up borrowing the money from Alice. Sally has the abortion and Henry berates Nicky for not being there for his girlfriend. This causes a brief rift that is mended when each realizes that they need each other in order to handle the difficult transition they are about to make. Henry and Caddie also briefly fall out due to the misunderstanding of her status but reconcile and have an emotional goodbye before he leaves.

Ultimately the boys prepare to get on the train taking them away to the war, they wait for it to go by before racing after it and jumping on.

== Cast ==
- Sean Penn as Henry "Hopper" Nash
- Elizabeth McGovern as Caddie Winger
- Nicolas Cage as Nicky
- John Karlen as Mr. Nash
- Rutanya Alda as Mrs. Nash
- Max Showalter as Mr. Arthur
- Bob Maroff as Al
- Crispin Glover as Gatsby Boy
- Barbara Howard as Gatsby Girl
- John Brandon as Mr. Kaiser
- Eve Brent as Mrs. Kaiser
- Suzanne Adkinson as Sally Kaiser
- Shawn Schepps as Gretchen
- Charles Miller as Arnie
- Pat Carroll as Mrs. Spangler
- Al Hopson as Elmer
- Scott McGinnis as Michael
- Kate Williamson as Mrs. Winger
- Michael Madsen as Frank
- Dana Carvey as "Baby Face"
- Michael Talbott as Bill
- Carol Kane as Annie

== Production ==
Producer Alain Bernheim, a former literary agent, had been inspired to make a movie about World War II and hired first time screenwriter Steve Kloves to develop a story based on their discussions. After attempts to get the film set up with United Artists and 20th Century Fox, Bernheim managed to get the film setup with Paramount Pictures. While the producers praised the performances and chemistry of Sean Penn, Elizabeth McGovern, and Nicolas Cage, they expressed frustration with their reluctance in promoting the film and attributed the film's tepid box office to the cast's unwillingness to do promotional tours.

== Reception ==
As of March 2025, Racing with the Moon holds a rating of 67% on Rotten Tomatoes based on 12 reviews. Roger Ebert's 1984 review gave the film a 3.5 star review and lauded Penn's mature and complex performance.

=== Accolades ===
The film is recognized by American Film Institute in these lists:

- 2002: AFI's 100 Years...100 Passions – Nominated
