= BMP (vehicle) =

Soviet infantry fighting-vehicle series

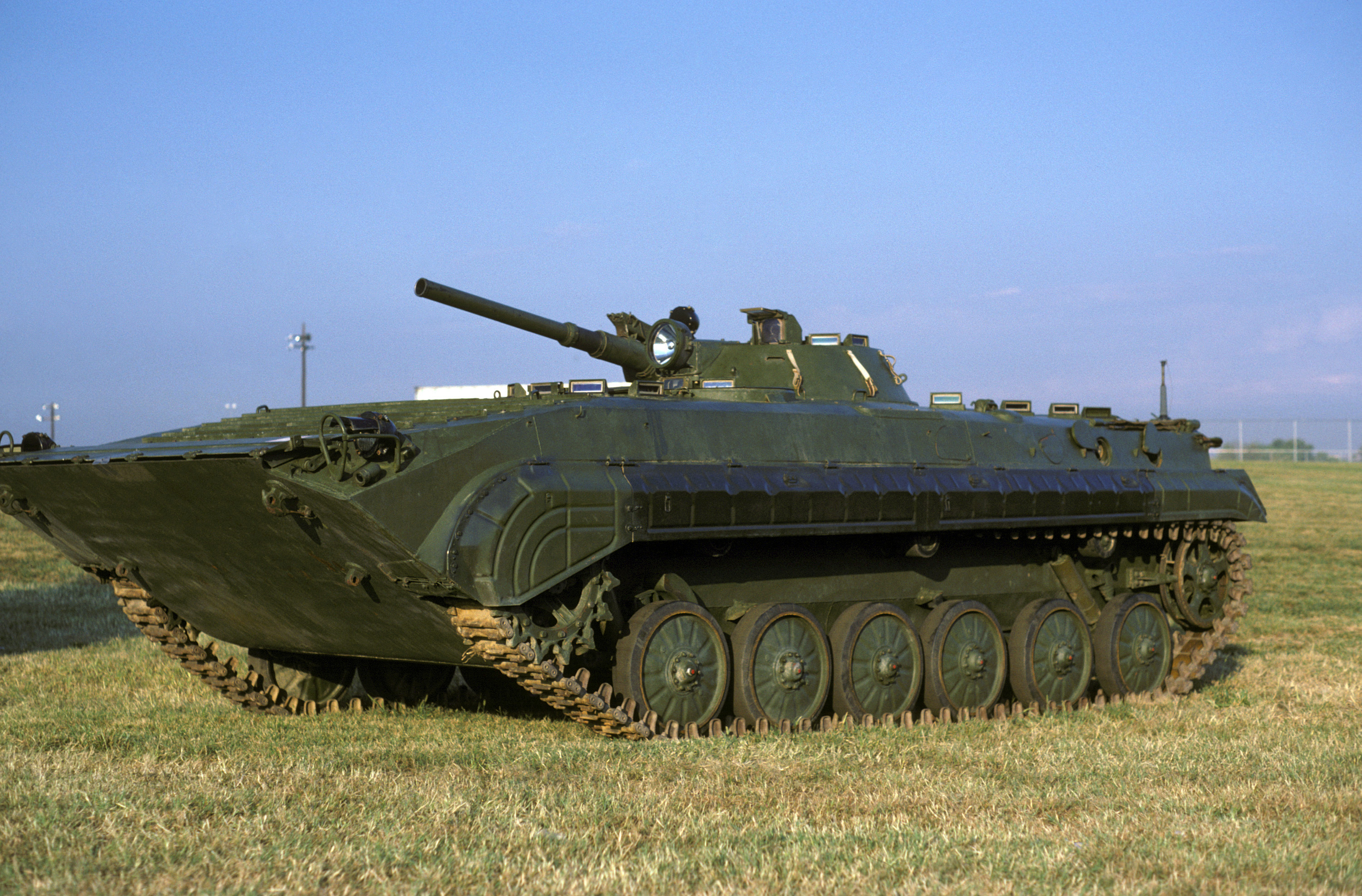
BMP-1

The Soviet BMP series were among the first production-line infantry fighting-vehicles. The series includes the mainline BMPs, the airborne variant BMDs, and licensed modified (i.e. MLI-84) and reverse-engineered versions (i.e. Boragh, Type 86).

"BMP" (Russian: БМП) stands for Boyevaya mashina pekhoty – Russian: Боевая машина пехоты, lit. 'fighting-vehicle of infantry'. The vehicles were initially developed in the 1960s in the Soviet Union.

== Background ==
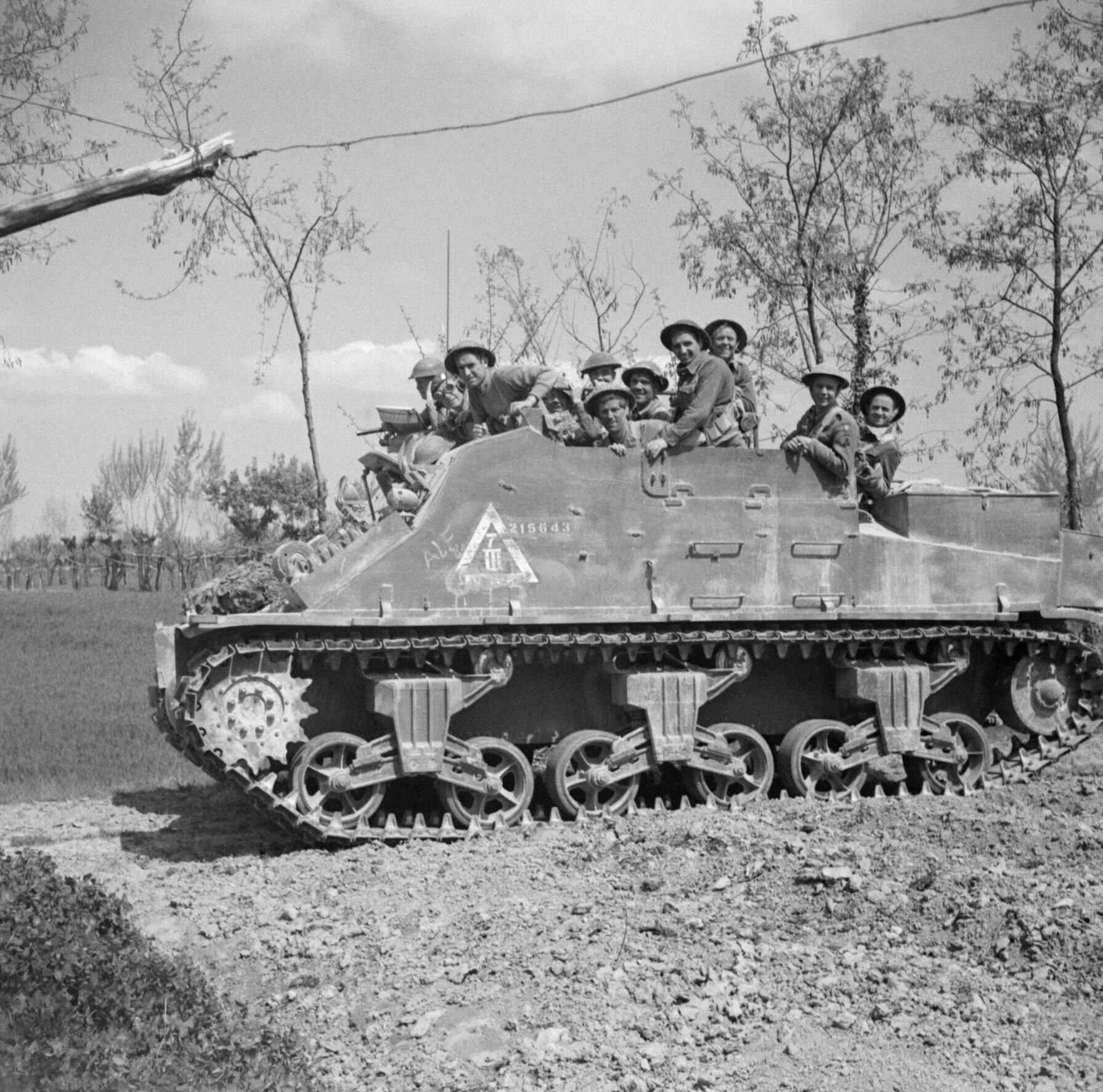
Priest Kangaroo armored personnel carrier, 1945.

World War II began with the concepts of armored warfare relatively undeveloped, particularly the use of combined arms teams. Tank and infantry units were often organized as separate units, which led to problems of command and coordination.

As the war progressed the doctrine of combined arms became better refined, and the need for specialist vehicles to keep the infantry in close contact with the armor became increasingly important. Most of these vehicles were half-tracks. There were expedient measures; the infantry of the Red Army often rode on the top of tanks. In 1944 the Canadians introduced the practice of converting self-propelled guns and tanks to carry infantry - known as "Kangaroos". The Kangaroo pointed the way forward, offering much better armor than half-tracks and able to keep up with the tanks on any terrain.

In the post-war era most armies started introducing fully tracked vehicles in the dedicated armored personnel carrier role, including the Soviet BTR-50, British FV432, and the US M113. These vehicles generally suffered in terms of range and speed, and many forces also adopted wheeled vehicles in addition to, or instead of the tracked versions. In general, these vehicles offered limited protection and were not expected to join in the actual fighting; they would keep the infantry in close proximity with the armor during movement, but upon enemy contact they would unload their infantry before retreating to safer areas - a practice that led to them being called "battlefield taxis" or "battle-taxis". During the 1950s this mode of combat was increasingly questioned. Unloading the infantry onto a battlefield that was assumed to be littered with chemical and nuclear poisons did not seem like a good idea. Further, while the APCs moved to and from combat the infantry section in the back had nothing to do, a claustrophobic environment where the men could not add to the fight. Military theorists turned to the concept of the infantry fighting vehicle (IFV), similar to the APC but with the expectation that the infantry section would be able to stay in the vehicle and fight effectively, while also improving the vehicle's own armament. The Soviets adapted to this new style of fully mechanized combat, issuing requirements and then introducing the BMP in mid-1960s.

== Requirements ==
The requirement for the BMP was first drawn up in the late 1950s. The requirement stressed speed, good armament, and the ability for all squad members to fire from within the vehicle. The armament had to provide direct support for dismounted infantry in the attack and defense and to be able to destroy comparable light armored vehicles such as the American M59 APC or the West German HS.30 IFV.

The armor was required to protect the crew and passengers from light shell fragments as well as .50 cal armor-piercing bullets and 20–23 mm caliber autocannons across the frontal arc at distances between 500 m and 800 m (the distance of infantrymen dismounting onto the battlefield during an attack). Side armor should be capable of withstanding 7.62 mm armor-piercing bullets from a distance of 75 m. The requirements also included an NBC protection system, observation devices similar to those used in MBTs and a radio capable of communicating with unit commanders and tanks.

The original specification called for the vehicle to be armed with a 23 millimetres (0.91 in) autocannon, however an innovative combination of the 73 mm 2A28 Grom low pressure smoothbore semi-automatic gun firing rocket-assisted projectiles and the newly developed 9S428 anti tank wire guided missile (ATGM) launcher for the selected 9M14 "Malyutka" (AT-3A Sagger A) ATGMs was used instead. The gun was intended to engage enemy armored vehicles and firing points at a range of up to 1,300 metres (1,400 yd), while the missile launcher was intended to be used against targets that were 500 metres (550 yd) to 3,000 metres (3,300 yd) away. The smoothbore gun and the ATGM launching system were to be mounted in a compact one-man turret from the Tula Instrument Engineering Design Bureau (KBP).

== Prototypes ==
The requirements were issued to the various design bureaus between 1959 and 1960. There was a question as to whether the BMP should be tracked or wheeled, so a number of experimental configurations were explored including hybrid wheeled/tracked designs. The prototypes (designated as "objects" according to Soviet classification) were:

- Ob'yekt 1200 from Bryansk Automobile Works (BAZ), 1964 - an 8-wheeled design, similar to the BTR-60PB APC. Like the said APC, the Ob'yekt 1200 prototype had a rear engine design which counted against it. It was eliminated because its cross-country ability (especially in snow and deep mud) was similarly mediocre to the said APC due to the overweight of the 8 x 8 chassis.
- Ob'yekt 911 from the Volgograd Tractor Works (VTZ), chief designer I. V. Gavalov, 1964 - was a hybrid tracked design, with 4 additional retractable wheels for high speed road travel. The complex design was felt to offer no advantages.
- Ob'yekt 914 from the Volgograd Tractor Factory (VTZ), chief designer I. V. Gavalov, 1964 - was a tracked design and a variant of Ob'yekt 911. Based on the PT-76 amphibious light tank chassis with a similar armament to other BMP prototypes (except the Ob'yekt 914 was also armed with two 7.62 mm PKT machine guns mounted in the hull on both sides of the driver). It weighed 14.4 tonnes, had a crew of two and could transport up to eight fully equipped soldiers (two of whom operated the PKT machine guns). The rear engine design counted against it, forcing infantry to mount and dismount through the single door in the rear of the right hand side of the vehicle and roof hatches. It was also felt that the Ob'yekt 764 had a better layout. Work on the experimental Ob'yekt 914 helped a lot in the following layout development of the BMD-1 (Ob'yekt 915) airborne infantry fighting vehicle.
- Ob'yekt 19 from the Altai Tractor Plant in Rubtsovsk, 1965 - was a 4 x 4 wheeled design with retractable tracks between the wheel axles which were intended for crossing rough ground. Once again the very complicated hybrid design was felt to offer no clear advantage over a tracked design.
- Ob'yekt 764 from the Chelyabinsk Tractor Works (ChTZ); chief designer P. P. Isakov, 1964-1965 - the main prototype of the BMP was equipped with a waterjet for swimming (the waterjet was later removed to save interior space). After it passed the trials, it was improved and became the BMP-1 (Ob'yekt 765).

During this time, the United States had successfully introduced the M113 armored personnel carrier in the Vietnam War in 1962. Though not designed as a combat vehicle, its light armor and mobility was effective against most small arms employed by the Viet Cong forces. It had been adapted into an infantry fighting vehicle with the fitting of an open turret and gun shields. Unlike the BMP, it lacked the firepower and armor to defeat and survive against other armored combat vehicles. After the appearance of the BMP, the US responded with a series of infantry fighting vehicle designs, starting with the MICV-65, although nothing entered service until the M-2 Bradley appeared during the early 1980s.

== Ob'yekt 765 ==
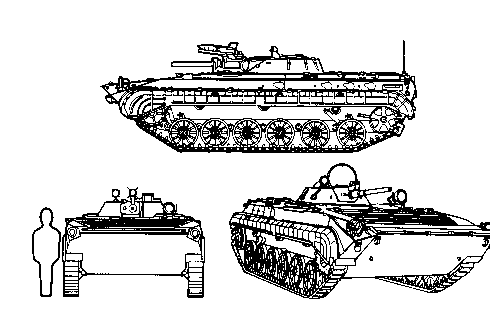
Three views of the BMP-1 (Ob'yekt 765Sp1) graphic.

The tracked Ob'yekt 764 was chosen, after a few improvements, because its front engine design provided a convenient and fast way of mounting and dismounting through two rear doors. As a result of its rather weak armor, the BMP was relatively light and required little preparation for amphibious operations.

The original production prototype, which was built in 1965, was designated BMP. Small-scale production began in 1966 at Chelyabinsk to permit field trials, although the Kurgan Machine Building Plant (KMZ) was converted to BMP production as Chelyabinsk was committed to tank production. A number of defects were corrected between 1966 and 1970 resulting in four slightly different production design variants of the first models. (Ob'yekt 765Sp1 and Ob'yekt 765Sp2). The key changes made to the design were:

- The suspension was strengthened to cope with high speeds.
- A new chemical filter system was fitted on the left hand side of the turret in addition to the already existing radiological protection system.
- The openly mounted air filtration system was moved from the left hand side of the hull to a separate compartment inside the vehicle behind the commander's station.
- The fume extractors for the firing ports were moved to eject the fumes to the rear of the vehicle.
- The trim board was modified.
- The new air intake was fitted with a low snorkel to prevent water flooding the vehicle while swimming.
- The fender profile was modified.
- The detachable hatch cover over the engine compartment was replaced with a hinged cover.
- The Commander's hatch was fitted with a torsion bar, the troop hatches were fitted with key locks.
- The tool stowage boxes on the fenders were removed.
- Firing ports (one on each side) were provided for the squad's PKM general purpose machine gun.
- The 9S428 ATGM launcher was improved to fire 9M14M 'Malyutka-M' (AT-3B Sagger B) ATGMs.
- The nose section of the hull was modified and extended by 250 mm to shift the center of gravity to prevent the nose section from being too heavy, it could often cause "submarining" when swimming. The height of the hull was slightly increased for the same purpose.

Further improvements included a new 1PN22M2 sight, turn signals, and many smaller details, (for example, mounting the trim vane on six hinges instead of two, improved hermetic sealing of the commander's hatch, new construction of the gunner's seat, etc.). All those changes resulted in the combat weight increasing from 13.0 tonnes to 13.2 tonnes. Series production of the final production model, the Ob'yekt 765Sp3 (NATO: BMP-1 Model 1970), began at the Kurgan Engineering Works in 1973.

=== Models ===
A large number of variants of the BMP-1 were produced. The most notable IFV variants based on the BMP-1 were: BMP-2, MLI-84 and Boragh.

==== Table of models ====
Characteristics of the main models of the BMP series
| | BMP-1 (ob'yekt 765Sp1) | BMP-1 (ob'yekt 765Sp2) | BMP-1 (ob'yekt 765Sp3) | BMP-1P (ob'yekt 765Sp4/5) | BMP-1D | BMP-2 | BMP-3 |
|---|---|---|---|---|---|---|---|
| Weight (tonnes) | 12.6 | 13.0 | 13.2 | 13.4 | 14.5 | 14.0 | 18.7 |
| Crew | 3+8 | | | | | 3+7 | |
| Main gun | 73 mm 2A28 "Grom" low pressure smoothbore semi-automatic gun | | | | | 30 mm 2A42 autocannon | 100 mm 2A70 rifled automatic gun/missile-launcher 30 mm 2A72 autocannon |
| Machine gun(s) | 7.62 mm PKT coaxial | | | | | | 3 × 7.62 mm PKT (1 coaxial, 2 bow mounted) |
| ATGM (NATO designation) | 9M14 "Malyutka" (AT-3 Sagger) and variants | | | 9M113 "Konkurs" (AT-5 Spandrel) or 9M111 "Fagot" (AT-4 Spigot) and variants | 9M14 "Malyutka" or 9M113 "Konkurs" or removed (on most vehicles) | 9M113 "Konkurs" (AT-5 Spandrel) or 9M111 "Fagot" (AT-4 Spigot) and variants | 9M117 "Bastion" (AT-10 Stabber) |
| Engine | UTD-20 6-cylinder 4-stroke V-shaped airless-injection water cooled diesel developing 300 hp (224 kW) at 2,600 rpm | | | | | UTD-20S1 diesel developing 300 hp (224 kW) at 2,600 rpm | UTD-29M 10-cylinder diesel developing 500 hp (375 kW) at 2,600 rpm |
| Power-to-weight ratio hp/tonne (kW/tonne) | 23.8 (17.8) | 23.1 (17.2) | 22.7 (17.0) | 22.4 (16.7) | 20.7 (15.5) | 21.4 (16.0) | 26.7 (20.0) |

== BMP-2 ==
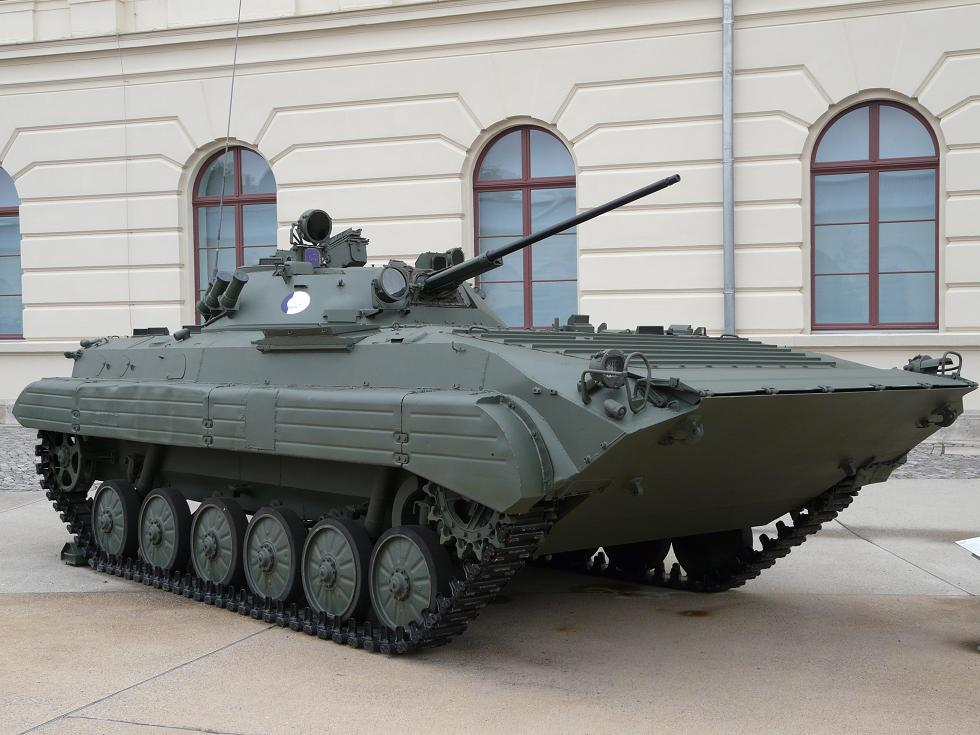
Nationale Volksarmee BMP-2

Although the BMP-1 was a revolutionary design, its main armament, the 2A28 Grom and the 9S428 ATGM launcher capable of firing the 9M14 Malyutka (NATO: AT-3A Sagger A) and the 9M14M Malyutka-M (NATO: AT-3B Sagger B) ATGMs, quickly became obsolete. Therefore, the Soviet Union decided to produce an updated and improved version of the BMP-1. The main emphasis was put on improving the main armament. In 1972 work got underway to develop an improved version of the BMP-1. An experimental prototype, the Ob'yekt 680 was produced. Ob'yekt 680 had a new two-man turret armed with a Shipunov 2A42 30 mm autocannon and a secondary 7.62 mm machine gun mounted in a barbette similar to the Marder.

The BMP-1 was to be tested in combat in the October 1973 Yom Kippur War. Egypt received 230 BMP-1s in 1973. Syria had received between 150 and 170 by the start of the war, of which about 100 were committed to the front line. Israeli forces captured or destroyed 40 to 60 Egyptian BMPs and 50 to 60 Syrian BMPs, mechanical problems accounting for a large number of the Syrian losses.

The BMP proved vulnerable to .50 caliber machinegun fire in the sides and rear, and to infantry-based 106 mm recoilless rifles. The need to keep some of the roof hatches open to prevent the vehicle from overheating meant that the vehicle could be disabled by machinegun fire from infantry on higher ground shooting into open hatches. The 73 mm gun proved inaccurate beyond 500 meters, and the AT-3 Sagger missile could not be guided effectively from the confines of the turret. The BMP-1's low profile means that it was difficult for the BMP to fire over the heads of the advancing infantry it was supporting.

On the positive side, the vehicle was praised for being fast and agile. Its low ground pressure enabled it to navigate the northern Kantara salt marshes where other vehicles would have bogged down. Its ability to swim proved useful: it was used in the first wave of canal crossings by the Egyptians.

Several Soviet technical teams were sent to Syria in the wake of the war to gather information. These lessons combined with observations of western AFV developments resulting in a replacement program for the original BMP in 1974.

The first product of this program was the BMP-1P upgrade intended as a stopgap to address the most serious problems with the existing design. Smoke grenade launchers were added to the rear of the turret and the manually guided AT-3 Sagger missile system was replaced with the semi-automatically guided AT-4 Spigot and AT-5 Spandrel system. The new missiles were somewhat difficult to use since the gunner had to actually stand out on the roof to use the weapons, exposing himself to hostile fire. The BMP-1P was in production by the late 1970s and existing BMP-1s were gradually upgraded to the standard during the 1980s.

A development program to completely address the shortcomings of the BMP was started at the same time resulting in four prototypes, all of which had two-man turrets.

- Ob'yekt 675 from Kurgan - BMP-1 hull, armed with a 2A42 30 mm autocannon. This eventually became the BMP-2.
- Ob'yekt 681 from Kurgan - BMP-1 hull, armed with a lengthened 73 mm gun.
- Ob'yekt 768 from Chelyabinsk - Lengthened hull with 7 road wheels and armed with a lengthened 73 mm gun.
- Ob'yekt 769 from Chelyabinsk - Lengthened hull with 7 road wheels and armed with a 2A42 30 mm autocannon.

The commander was moved inside the turret on all of the prototypes because of the dead zone created by the infra-red searchlight when he was seated in the hull; as well, the commander's view to the rear was blocked by the turret. The new two-man turret took up much more space in the hull than the original one-man turret, resulting in a smaller crew area. A lengthened version of the original 73 mm gun was considered, but after some debate the 30 mm gun was selected for the following reasons:

- It offered higher maximum elevation - a critical factor in Afghanistan, where the limited elevation of the gun caused problems.
- The high-velocity gun had better maximum range (2000–4000 meters) that would allow the BMPs to support the tanks spearheading any assault.
- It also offered a useful anti-helicopter capability.
- The 73 mm gun had been mounted on the older BMP-1 to retain anti-tank capability as a basic doctrine design specification. With the introduction of Chobham armour on NATO tanks, the 73 mm gun became ineffectual and obsolete, and given a lack of a suitable gun design as a replacement in this role at the time, a 30 mm gun was introduced as a replacement, notably with an anti-helicopter role as a new threat emergent since the Vietnam War. (Perrett 1987:77) The anti-tank capability was however retained in the BMP-2 with the continued use of anti-tank guided missiles. The new vehicles now allowed the gunner to fire 9K111 Fagot (AT-4) and 9M113 Konkurs (AT-5) missiles from within the protection of the turret.

Eventually the Ob'yekt 675 was selected to become the BMP-2, probably because a new hull design would have required extensive retooling at BMP production plants.

== BMP-3 ==
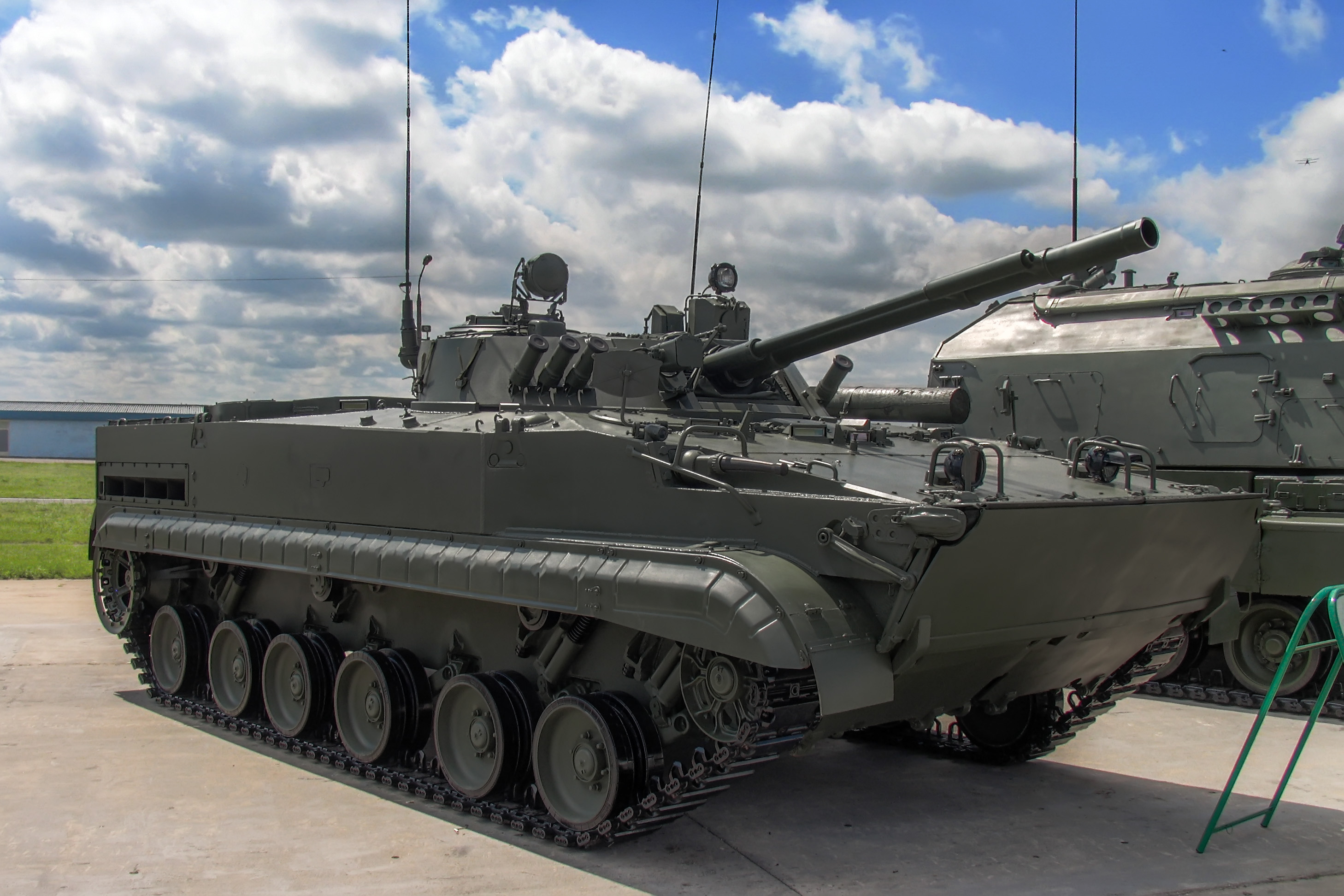
Russian Army BMP-3

The design of the BMP-3 or Obyekt 688M can be traced back to the Obyekt 685 light tank prototype with 100 mm gun 2A48-1 from 1975. This vehicle did not enter series production, but the chassis, with a new engine, was used for the next-generation infantry combat vehicle Obyekt 688 from A. Blagonravov's design bureau. The Ob. 688 weapons configuration—an externally mounted 30 mm gun and twin Konkurs ATGM launcher—was rejected; instead the new 2K23 armament system was selected. The resulting BMP-3 was developed in the early 1980s and entered service with the Soviet Army officially in 1987. At the moment the BMP-3 is the most modern, in service, tank of the BMP series while it is supposed to be replaced by the BMP T-15 Armata which is currently in the prototype stage.

== See also ==
- MICV-65 – (United States)
- BMP-23 – (Bulgaria)
- M2 Bradley – (United States)
- BTR-50 – (Soviet Union)
- BTR-60 – (Soviet Union)
