= Firing port =

Opening in armored vehicles

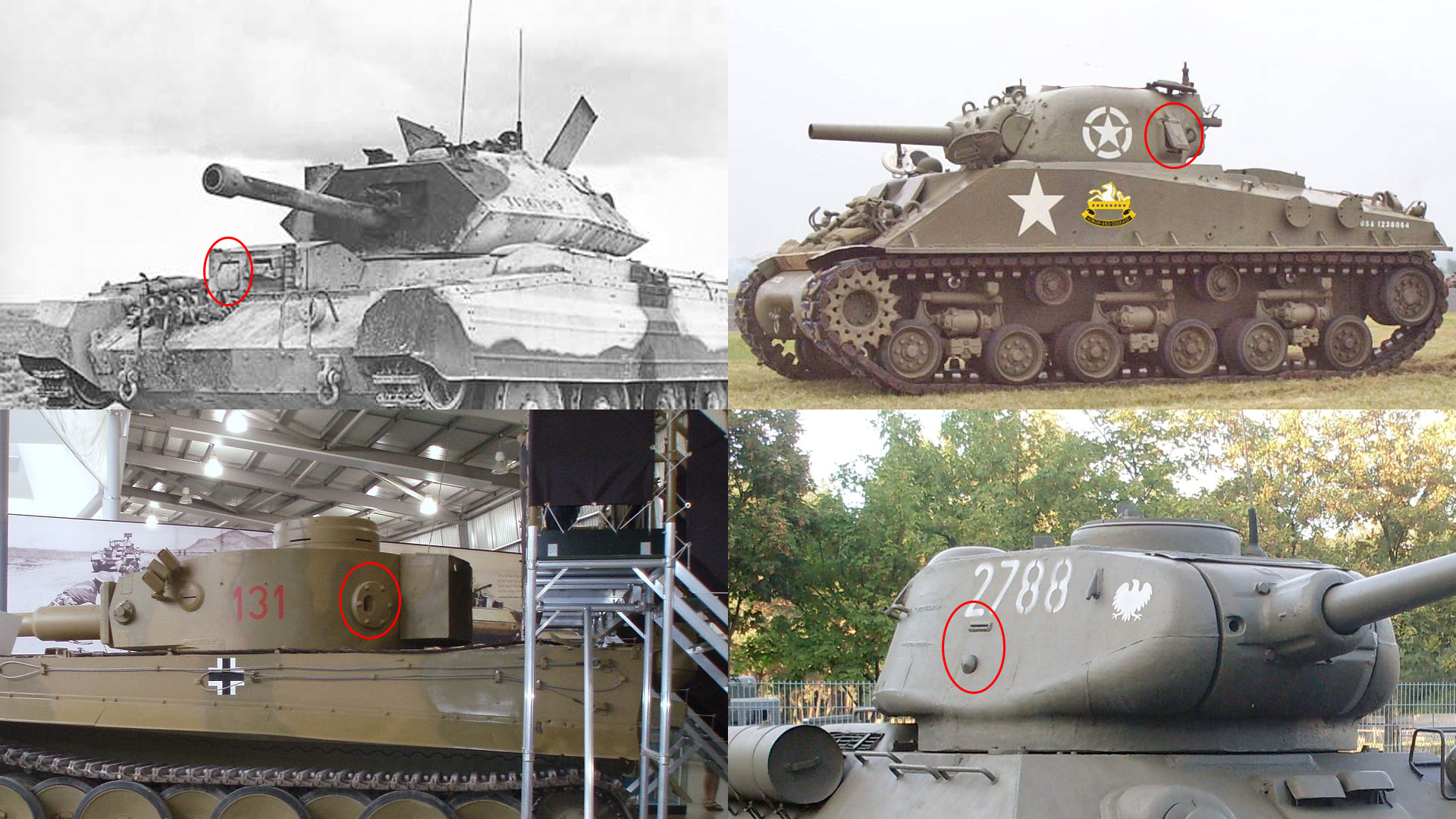
Firing ports (Clockwise from top left) of a Crusader tank, Sherman tank, T-34-85, Tiger I. The T-34-85 features an armor plug over the firing port.

A firing port, sometimes called a pistol port, is a small opening in armored vehicles, fortified structures like bunkers, or other armored equipment that allows small arms to be safely fired out of the vehicle at enemy infantry, often to cover vehicle or building blindspots. Examples of this can be seen in the Crusader tank, Sherman tank, Tiger I, T-34-85, and even modern armored vehicles today such as the Mechanized Infantry Combat Vehicle (MICV) program, its successor the Bradley Fighting Vehicle (BFV) featuring the M231 Firing Port Weapon, and Russian armored personnel carriers. Some firing ports are improvised for such use. For example a late production Tiger I manual shows the Nahverteidigungswaffe being used as a firing port.

Some pistol ports, such as on the Sherman, included vision slits such as "protectoscopes" increasing visibility around the tank.

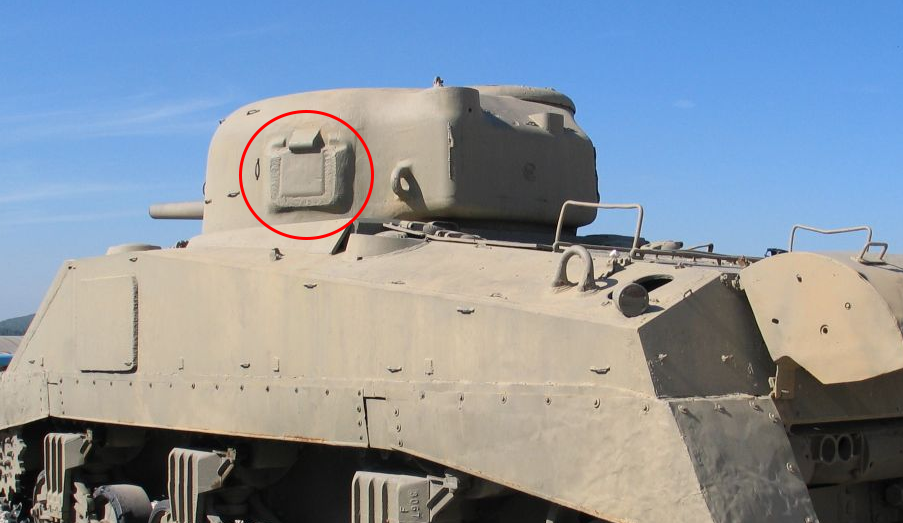
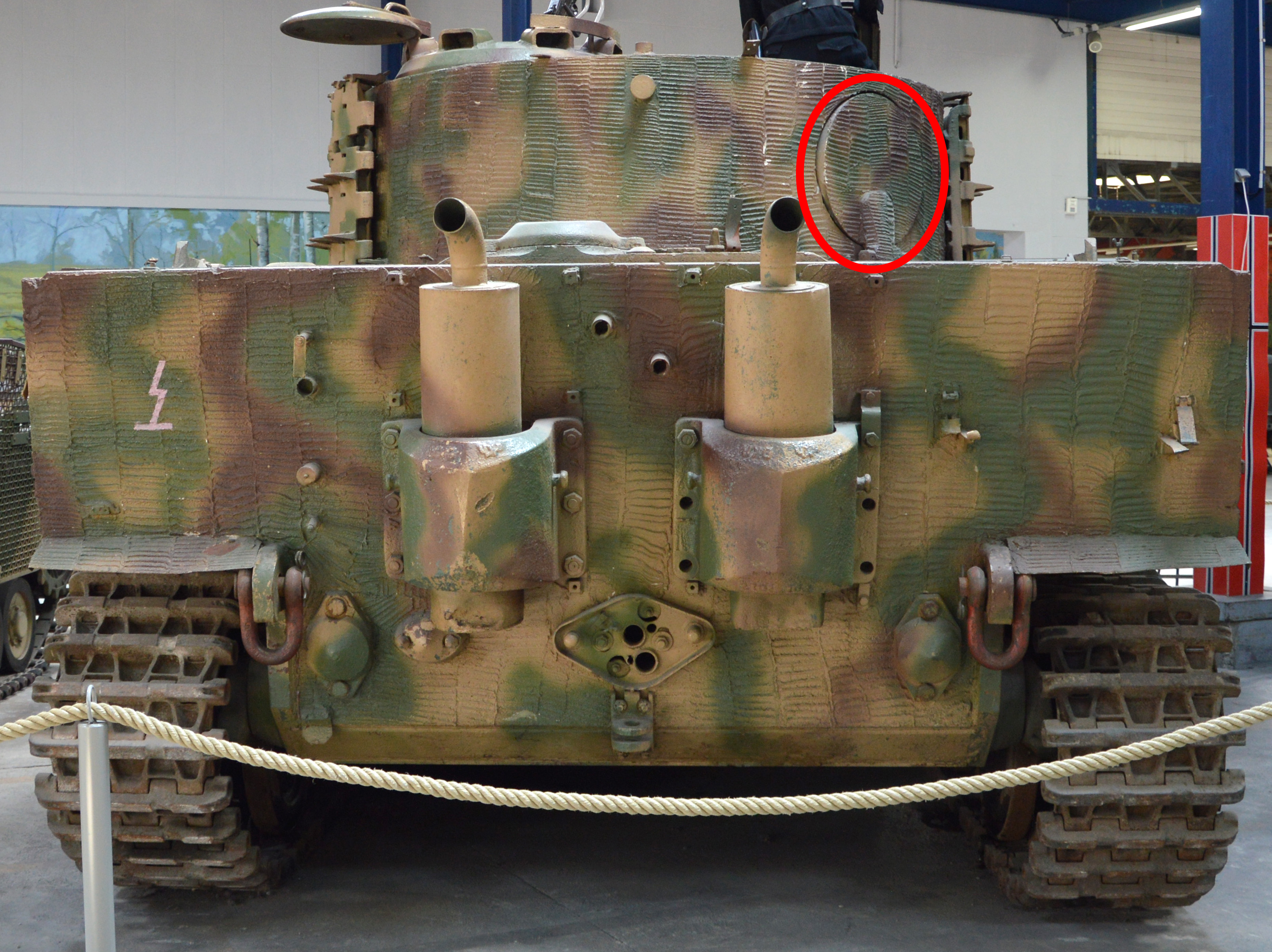
The welded over firing port of a Sherman tank and a Tiger I with the loader escape hatch on the rear of the turret and the absent 2nd firing port.

== Ballistic weakspot ==
Being a ballistic weak spot, firing ports are often reinforced with additional armor, and in subsequent designs reduced in number (BFV), or deleted altogether (Sherman and Tiger I [January 1944]). Other armor is improvised such as slat armor to stop shaped charges or chicken wire to stop grenades.

However, due to strong crew demand, they are sometimes brought back, as happened with the Sherman. This was in part due to its use during ammunition resupply in the Sherman, eliminating the need for an additional crew member to pass ammunition through the loader's hatch, instead of being able to simply pass the ammunition from the ground through the firing port.

One of the Tiger I's firing ports (right) was converted into a loader's escape hatch and the other covered with an armored plug and eventually deleted from the design to improve production time and reduce costs.

== See also ==
- M231 Firing Port Weapon
- Krummlauf
- Nahverteidigungswaffe
- Embrasure
- Gun turret
