= MICV-65 =

Military project of the US Army

MICV-65, short for Mechanized Infantry Combat Vehicle, 1965, was a US Army project that studied a number of armored fighting vehicles that would replace the M113 and M114 as well as take on a variety of new roles. A number of designs were studied as part of the MICV project, but none of them entered service for a variety of reasons. Nevertheless, experience gained in the MICV project eventually led to the M2 Bradley, which incorporates many of the MICV concepts.

== Background ==
World War II opened with the concepts of armored warfare relatively undeveloped. Infantry and armor were generally organized as separate units, which led to problems when the armor would outrace the infantry and then have to stop at various obstacles like rivers or strongpoints. As the war progressed the doctrine of combined arms became better refined, and the need for specialist vehicles to keep the infantry in close contact with the armor became increasingly important. Most of these vehicles were half-tracks, arguably the best known being the German Sd.Kfz. 251 and US M3. Other forces adopted expedient measures; Red Army infantry would often ride on the top of tanks, an extremely dangerous position, while the Canadians introduced a series of converted tanks known as Kangaroos. The Kangaroo pointed the way forward, offering much better armor than half-tracks and able to keep up with the tanks over rough ground.

In the post-war era most armies, save Germany's, started introducing fully tracked vehicles in the dedicated armored personnel carrier role, including the Soviet BTR-50, British FV432, and the US M113. These vehicles generally suffered in terms of range and speed on hard surfaces, and many forces also adopted wheeled vehicles in addition to, or completely replacing the tracked versions. Examples include the British Saracen and most of the Soviet BTR series, which were far more numerous than the tracked BTR-50. In general, wheeled or tracked, these vehicles offered limited protection and were not expected to join in the actual fighting; they would keep the infantry in close proximity with the armor during maneuvers, and then offload their infantry before retreating to safer areas. In the US military they were derided as "battlefield taxis".

During the 1950s this mode of combat was increasingly questioned. Germany had outright rejected them, instead going for the Schützenpanzer Lang HS.30, the first infantry fighting vehicle (IFV). Similar to the APC but with the expectation that the infantry section would be able to stay in the vehicle and fight effectively, thus improving the vehicles firepower. On a battlefield that was assumed to be littered with chemical and nuclear poisons the idea of unloading the infantry did not seem like a good idea. Further, while the APC's moved to and from combat the infantry section in the back had nothing to do, a claustrophobic environment where the men could not add to the fight. Military theorists turned to the concept when the Soviets were the first to follow the adaptation to this new style of combat, issuing requirements and then introducing the BMP in the late 1960s, followed soon after by the second German IFV Marder.

== MICV-65 ==
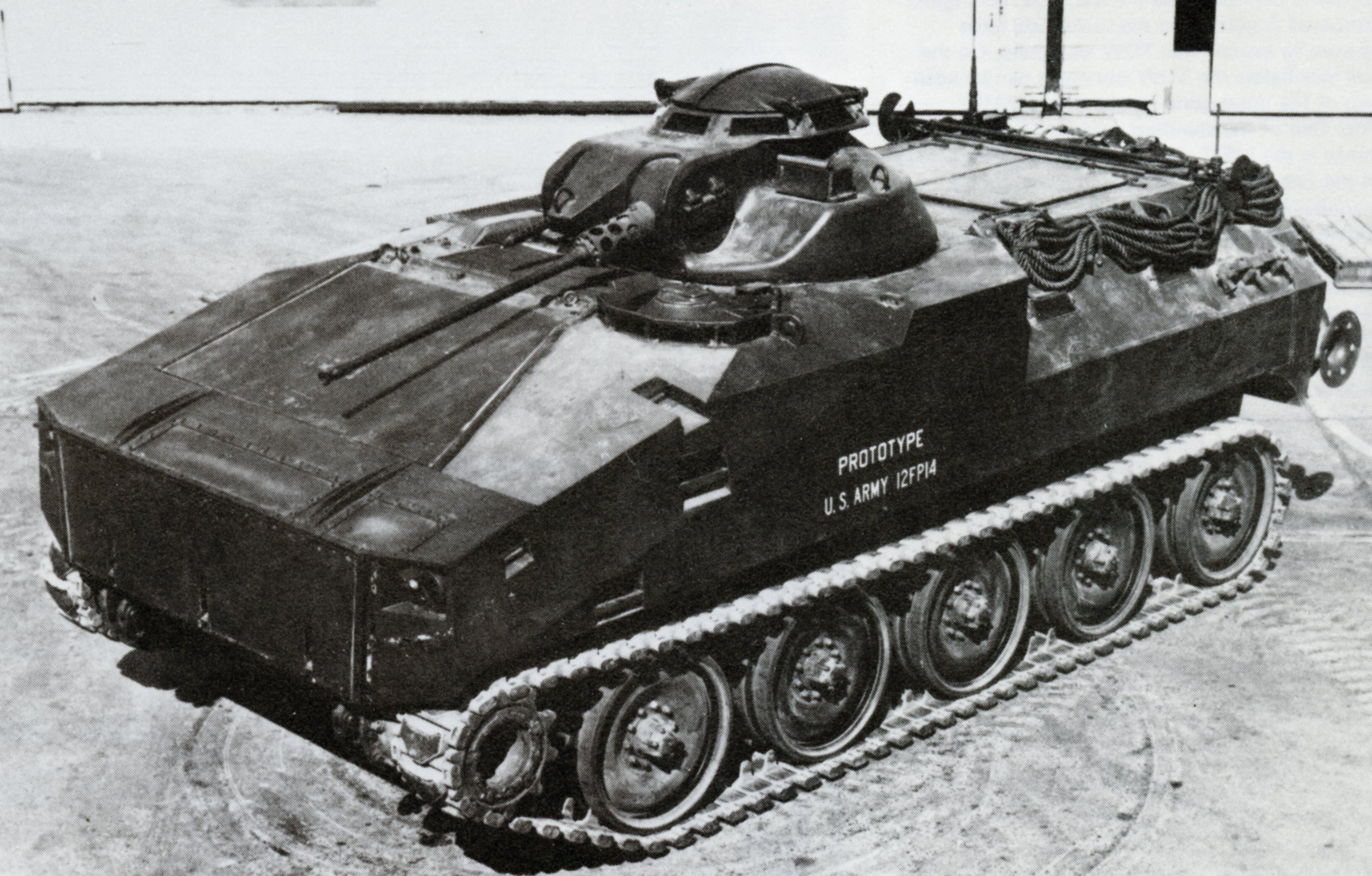
The XM-701's sloped rear deck contained firing ports for the infantry.

In the 1960s the United States Army Infantry School at Fort Benning started exploring these concepts on their own initiative. The M113 normally sat its infantry section on either side of the vehicle on benches, facing in towards the center. The School changed this arrangement by relocating the benches to the middle and having the infantry sit back-to-back, facing out. Covered rifle ports were cut into the walls, along with armored vision slots just above them, allowing the infantry to fire while under armor.

This experiment led to the development of the XM734, similar to the Infantry School version with the addition of a centrally mounted one-man enclosed gun cupola equipped with twin MGs or other weapons, and pintles for machine guns that could be fired from the rear of the vehicle though the top hatch. The result was a vehicle with dramatically improved firepower compared to the original M113. Showing promise, the Army decided to formally study new vehicles, forming the MICV-65 program.

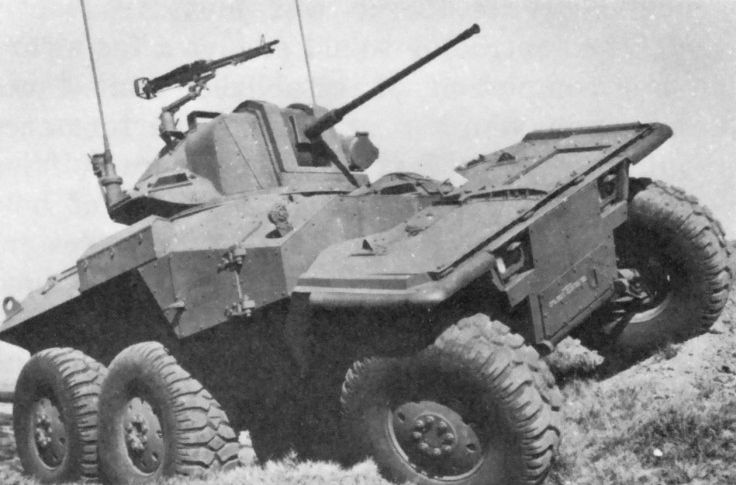
XM800W with the new turret design.

The primary concept studied under MICV-65 was a new IFV. Two main proposals were submitted, Pacific Car and Foundry's XM701 based on the M109 and M110 self-propelled artillery, and FMC's XM734 based on the M113. The program eventually selected the XM701 for further work. A requirement for a lighter scout vehicle also started at the same time, accepting two different proposals for the XM800 Armored Reconnaissance Scout Vehicle, one tracked, one wheeled. All of the vehicles were equipped with a similar turret armed with the M139 20 mm cannon (a licensed version of the Hispano-Suiza HS.820) and an M60-derived machine gun on a pintle mount.

FMC continued work on their own in spite of losing the MICV contest, and started work on a private project known as the XM765 Armoured Infantry Fighting Vehicle based on the M113 machinery and generally similar to the XM734 but with thicker armor and sloping it wherever possible. Although the AIFV would go on to see a number of international sales, the Army rejected it for a variety of reasons.

Testing of the XM701 completed in 1966, but the vehicle was eventually rejected as it was too heavy to be airlifted by the C-141 Starlifter that was rapidly becoming the basis for the US Air Forces strategic airlift system.

== MICV-70 ==
The program may have ended there, but in 1968 a task force under the command of Major General George Casey urged the Army to continue with the program as information about the BMP started to become available. The Army once again turned to FMC, asking the impossible; lower cost, better mobility, lighter weight and better armor.

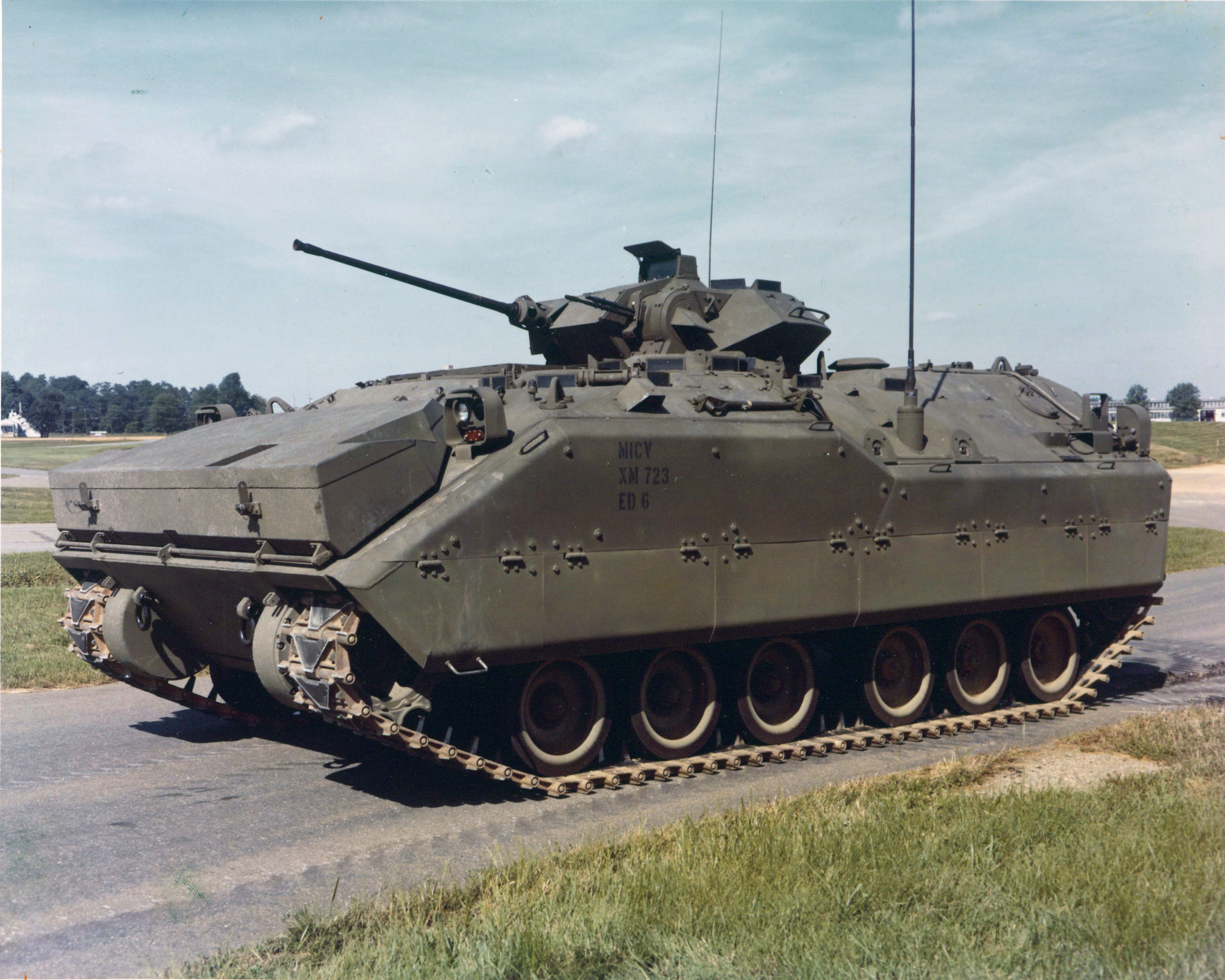
The FMC XM723

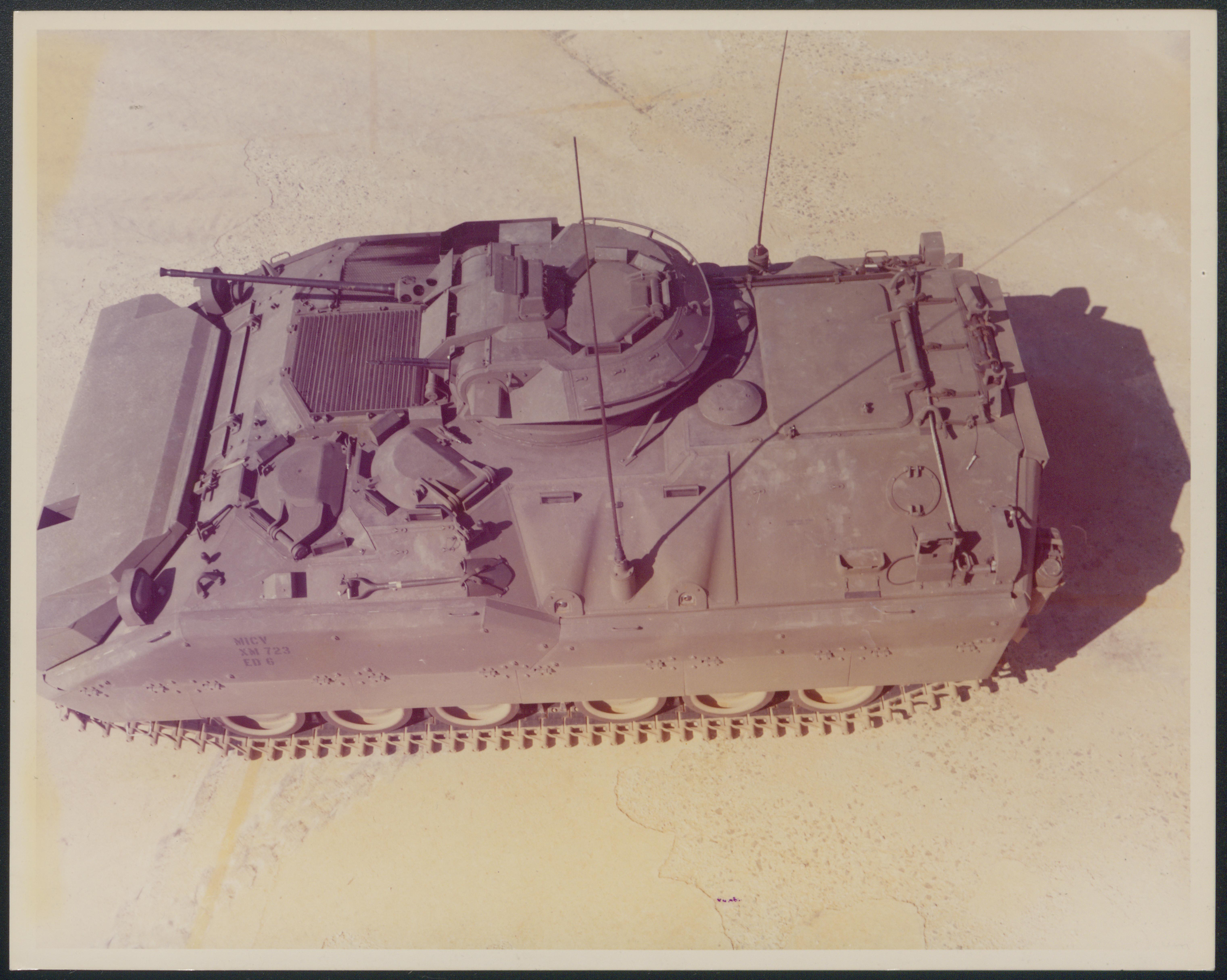
XM723; top view

FMC responded with an entirely new vehicle, the XM723, based on the machinery of the US Marine Corps LVT-7. It featured a new steel/aluminum laminate armor that protected it against small arms up to the Soviet post-war 14.5 mm KPV heavy machine gun, which equipped the BTR-60 and BTR-80. Like the earlier MICV vehicles, the XM723 carried nine infantry that were seated back-to-back with rifle ports and vision blocks. When the XM800 program was cancelled in 1975 the scout role was switched to the new vehicle as well.

Throughout the development the M139 had proven disappointing and development of a new 20 mm weapon, the VRFWS-S "Bushmaster", started in order to replace it. As the VRFWS-S was a risky proposition, development went ahead with the existing M139 in the meantime. At the same time, testing demonstrated that there was too little room in the cabin for the M16 rifle to be used through the firing ports. A new weapon, the M231 Firing Port Weapon, was eventually adapted for this role from a small number of potential solutions. The M231 is an open-bolt, full-auto only carbine variant of the M16.

Meanwhile, a new task force, under Brigadier General Larkin, studied various 3rd party IFVs, including the German Marder, French AMX-10P, and even examples of the BMP captured from Syria. A second study looked at vehicles with tank-like protection known as the "Heavy Infantry Vehicle", but this line was rejected on cost grounds as well as the added logistical requirements for everything from additional fuel to requiring bridging as they were too heavy to be made amphibious. Larkin's study ended in 1976, adding a further requirement that whatever vehicle was selected it should be available in a version equipped with the TOW missile for the light cavalry role.

FMC's XM723 seemed adaptable to both roles, and was renamed XM2 for the Infantry Fighting Vehicle and XM3 for the Cavalry Fighting Vehicle. The difference was primarily in the turret, with the XM2 having a single-man turret with the VRFWS-S cannon, and the XM3 including a larger two-man turret with both the cannon and a twin-tube TOW launcher. The primary reason for the two-man turret in the scout role was to give the commander a better field of view, in keeping with its battlefield observation role. During development the VRFWS-S was upgraded to a more powerful 25 mm caliber, emerging as the M242 Bushmaster. These vehicles evolved into the Bradley Fighting Vehicle that serves to this day.

== See also ==
- BMP Development
- BMP-1
- M2 Bradley
- Mechanized infantry
