= M231 Firing Port Weapon =

American assault rifle

Compact M16, 5.56mm: Port, Firing, M231
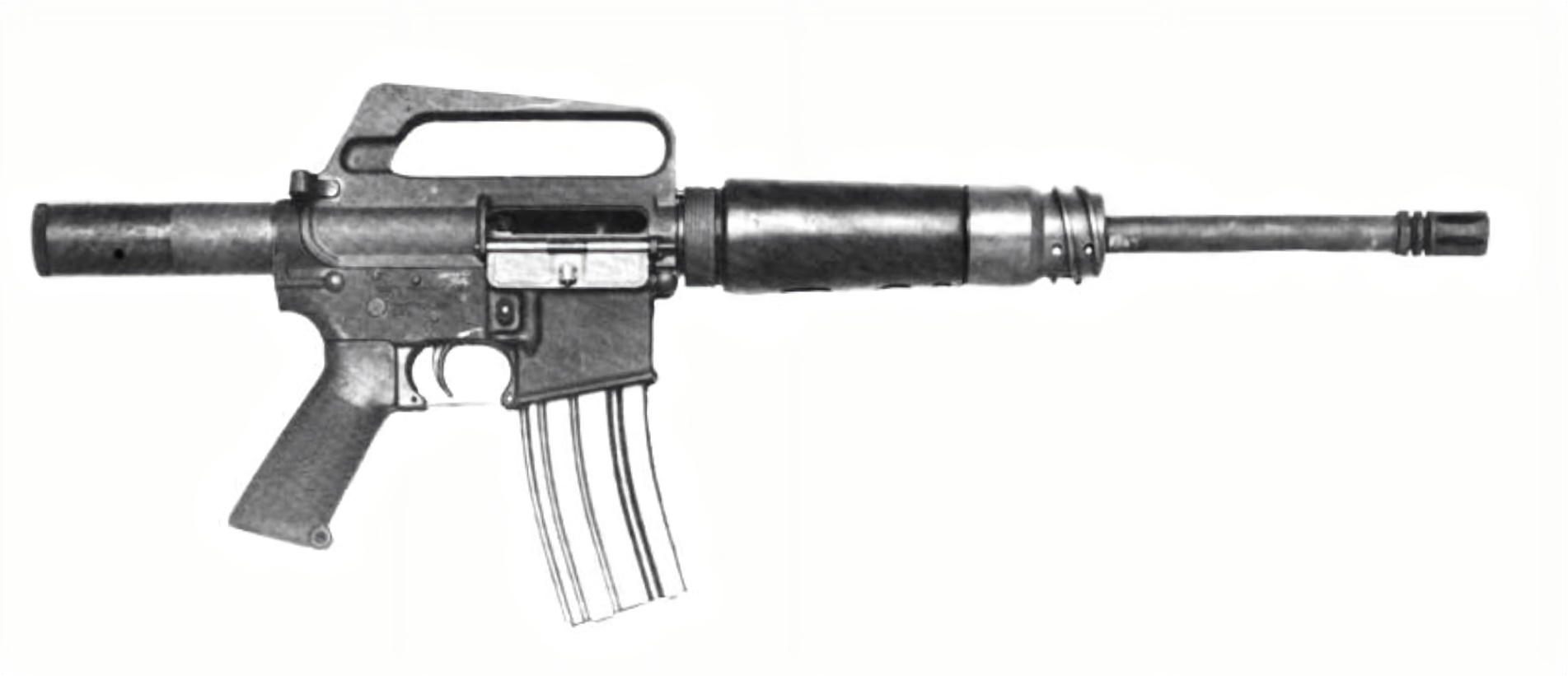
- M231
- Type: Carbine
- Place of origin: United States

Service history
- In service: 1980–present
- Used by: United States
- Wars: Gulf War; Iraq War

Production history
- Designed: 1979
- Produced: 1980–present
- Variants: None

Specifications
- Mass: Empty: 7.34 lb (3.33 kg) w/30-round magazine: 8.34 lb (3.79 kg)
- Length: 28.25 in. (71.76 cm)
- Barrel length: 396 mm (15.6 in)
- Cartridge: 5.56×45mm NATO
- Action: Gas-operated, rotating bolt
- Rate of fire: Sustained (Short Bursts): 50–60 rounds per minute Minimum Cyclic: 1225 rds per min
- Effective firing range: 328 yds (300 m)
- Feed system: 30-round STANAG Magazine

The M231 Firing Port Weapon (FPW) is an adapted version of the M16 assault rifle for shooting from firing ports on the M2 Bradley. The M16, standard infantry weapon of the time, was too long for use in a "buttoned up" APC, so the FPW was developed to provide a suitable weapon for this role. Designed by the Rock Island Arsenal, the M231 FPW remains in service. All but the rear two firing ports on the Bradley have been removed.

== History ==
Work started in 1972 on a dedicated Firing Port Weapon to go along with the Mechanized Infantry Combat Vehicle (MICV) program also started at that time. A requirement for these vehicles was to have firing ports for troops riding inside, and so it was decided that a specific weapon also be developed. The Rock Island Arsenal headed up the project working with the M3 submachine gun (a World War II-era SMG), a Firing Port Weapon created by Heckler & Koch based on the HK33, and a modified M16 rifle pattern weapon.

The qualities of the M16 were the most promising, and by 1974 it had been designated the XM231. Colt was given the contract and continued to work on the design. In 1979 the finalized weapon was adopted as the M231.

Although most of the Bradley AFV's ports have since been removed, these weapons are maintained, and are used by crews for self-defense, close-quarters situations, and for firing from the rear door firing ports as intended.

== Specifications ==
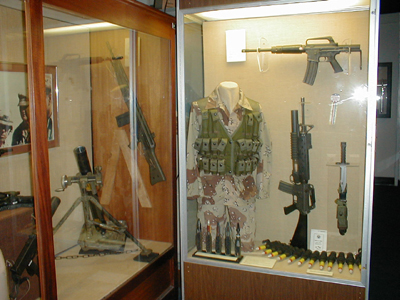
A M231 FPW, with wire stock (Top-right of the image)

The M231 is different in many ways from a standard M16. The original Rock Island Arsenal FPW fired from an open bolt, with an extremely high rate of firing (1,200 rpm). The Colt XM231 introduced a special buffer and spring assembly, with three springs nested one within the other. This was done to allow the rate of fire to be lowered to 1,050 rpm, to prevent the risk for soldiers opening fire from the moving vehicle of exhausting their magazine before the weapon was brought to target. The original Rock Island FPW had an 11-inch (280 mm) barrel, while the Colt prototypes and the production M231 both had 15.6 inch (396 mm) barrels.

Initially the FPWs had no locking mechanism and had flip up sights, along with a metal wire stock akin to that on the M3 submachine gun, to allow the weapon to be used outside of the vehicle more effectively. Later this was dropped, and a new hand-guard introduced with a screw type locking mechanism to fix the weapon into the port. Late XM231s had no rear sights either.

By the time the M231 was finalized the wire stock had been done away with as the weapon had a tendency to unfasten itself from the firing port and the stock was deemed to be dangerous in the confines of the vehicle. Or, alternatively, Army officials omitted the feature to discourage troops from employing the M231 in lieu of the issue M16 rifles. Likewise the intended mechanism to bring down the firing rate had been removed from the design again thus bringing the rate of fire back up to a rate of 1,100-1,200 round/min.

These weapons are only capable of fully automatic fire, with a special side plate mounted inside the lower receiver and a selector that only has "safe" and "auto" positions. These weapons retain a 65% parts commonality with standard M16 rifles. Only the M196 tracer round was authorized for operational use, with the M199 dummy and M200 blank for training use. In an emergency, M193 ball ammunition was to be used. The heavier M855 ball and M856 tracer rounds were never to be used.

Officially the FPW was not to be used detached from the parent vehicle, unless in an emergency. The operator's manual lists four precautions that would have to be taken to utilize the weapon outside of the vehicle. These included a note about the excessive muzzle rise of the weapon during firing, that the barrel collar would become hot when firing and should not be touched, that hearing protection should be worn, and lastly that a brass catching bag or evacuation hose system would have to be installed.

== See also ==
- Chauchat-Ribeyrolles 1918 submachine gun
- List of individual weapons of the U.S. Armed Forces
