= M2 Bradley =

American infantry fighting vehicle

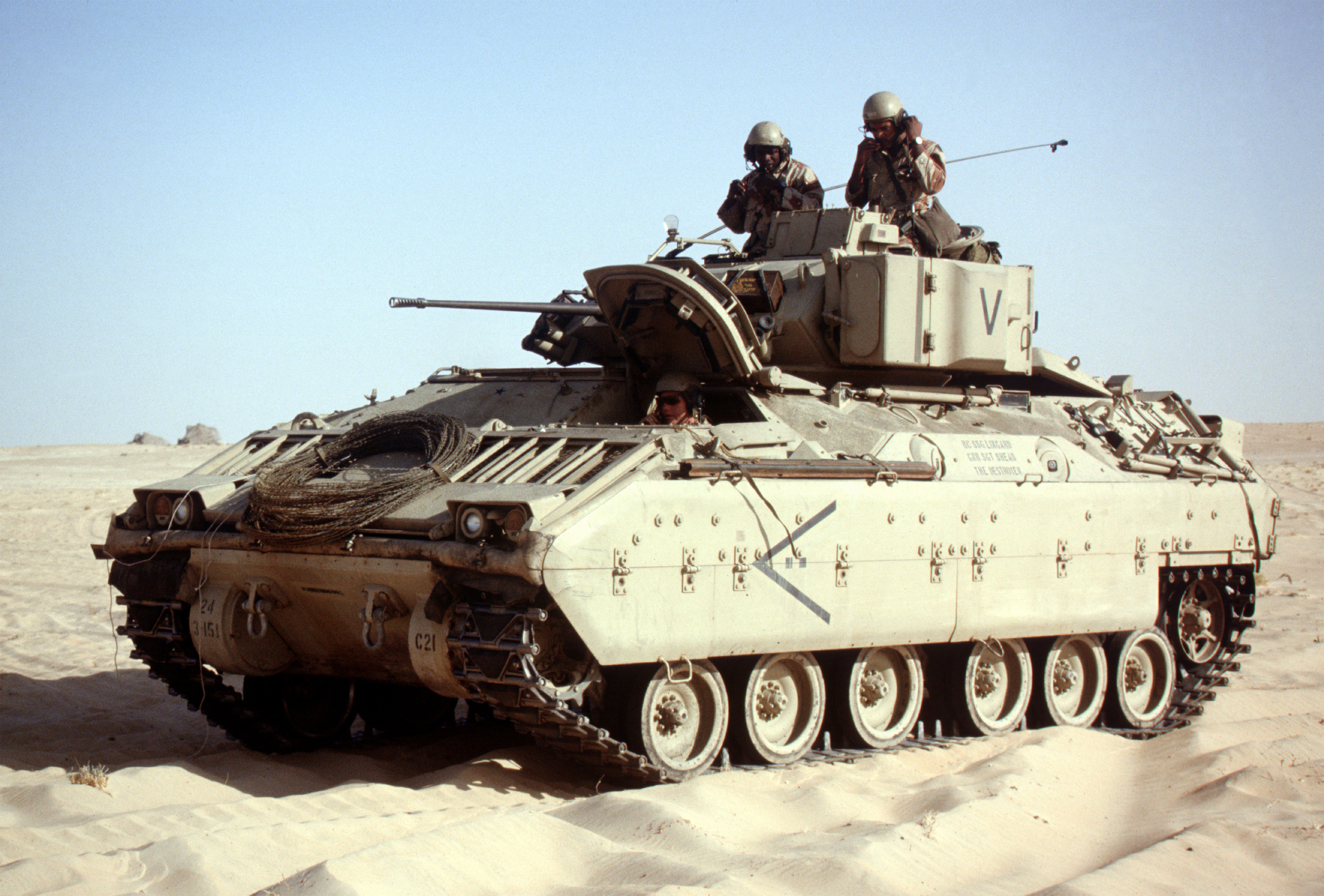
- An M2A1 Bradley during Operation Desert Shield, January 1991
- Type: Infantry fighting vehicle
- Place of origin: United States

Service history
- In service: 1981–present
- Used by: See Operators
- Wars: Gulf War; Iraq War; Yemeni Civil War; Syrian Civil War; Russo-Ukrainian War

Production history
- Manufacturer: United Defense (1981–1995); BAE Systems Platforms & Services (since 2004)
- Unit cost: $3,166,000 in 1998.
- Produced: 1981–1995 (United Defense); 2004–present (BAE Systems Platforms & Services)

Specifications
- Mass: 27.6 short tons (25.0 t)
- Length: 21.49 ft (6.55 m)
- Width: 11.82 ft (3.60 m)
- Height: 9.78 ft (2.98 m)
- Crew: 3 (commander, gunner, driver)
- Passengers: 6 (7 in M2A2 ODS/M2A3/M2A4)
- Armor: Spaced laminate armor offering 14.5 mm all around protection. Hull base is 7017 aluminum
- Main armament: 25 mm M242 chain gun (900 rounds); 2 × TOW anti-tank missile launchers (7 missiles)
- Secondary armament: 7.62 mm coaxial M240C machine gun (2,200 rounds)
- Engine: Cummins VTA-903T 8-cylinder diesel 600 hp (450 kW)
- Power/weight: 16.18 kW/tonne (21.7 hp/tonne)
- Suspension: Torsion bar
- Operational range: 300 mi (480 km)
- Maximum speed: 40 mph (64 km/h); 40 km/h off-road; 7.2 km/h in water

The M2 Bradley, or Bradley IFV, is an American infantry fighting vehicle that is a member of the Bradley Fighting Vehicle family. It is manufactured by BAE Systems Land & Armaments (formerly United Defense) and entered service in 1981, with fielding beginning in 1983.

The Bradley is designed for reconnaissance and to transport a nine-man rifle squad, providing them protection from small arms fire, while providing firepower to both suppress and eliminate most threats to friendly infantry. It is designed to be highly maneuverable and to be fast enough to keep up with heavy armor during an advance. The M2 holds a crew of three: a commander, a gunner, and a driver, and can carry six fully equipped soldiers as passengers.

In the year 2000, the total cost of the program was US$5,664,100,000 for 1,602 units, giving an average unit cost of $3,166,000, equivalent to $5,841,000 in 2025.

== Design ==
The Bradley IFV was developed largely in response to the amphibious Soviet BMP family of infantry fighting vehicles, and to serve as both an armored personnel carrier (APC), and a tank-killer. Design began in 1963, and it entered production in 1981. A specific design requirement was that it should be as fast as the new M1 Abrams main battle tank so that they could maintain formation while moving, something which the older M113 armored personnel carrier, designed to complement the older M60 Patton, could not do.

=== Armament ===
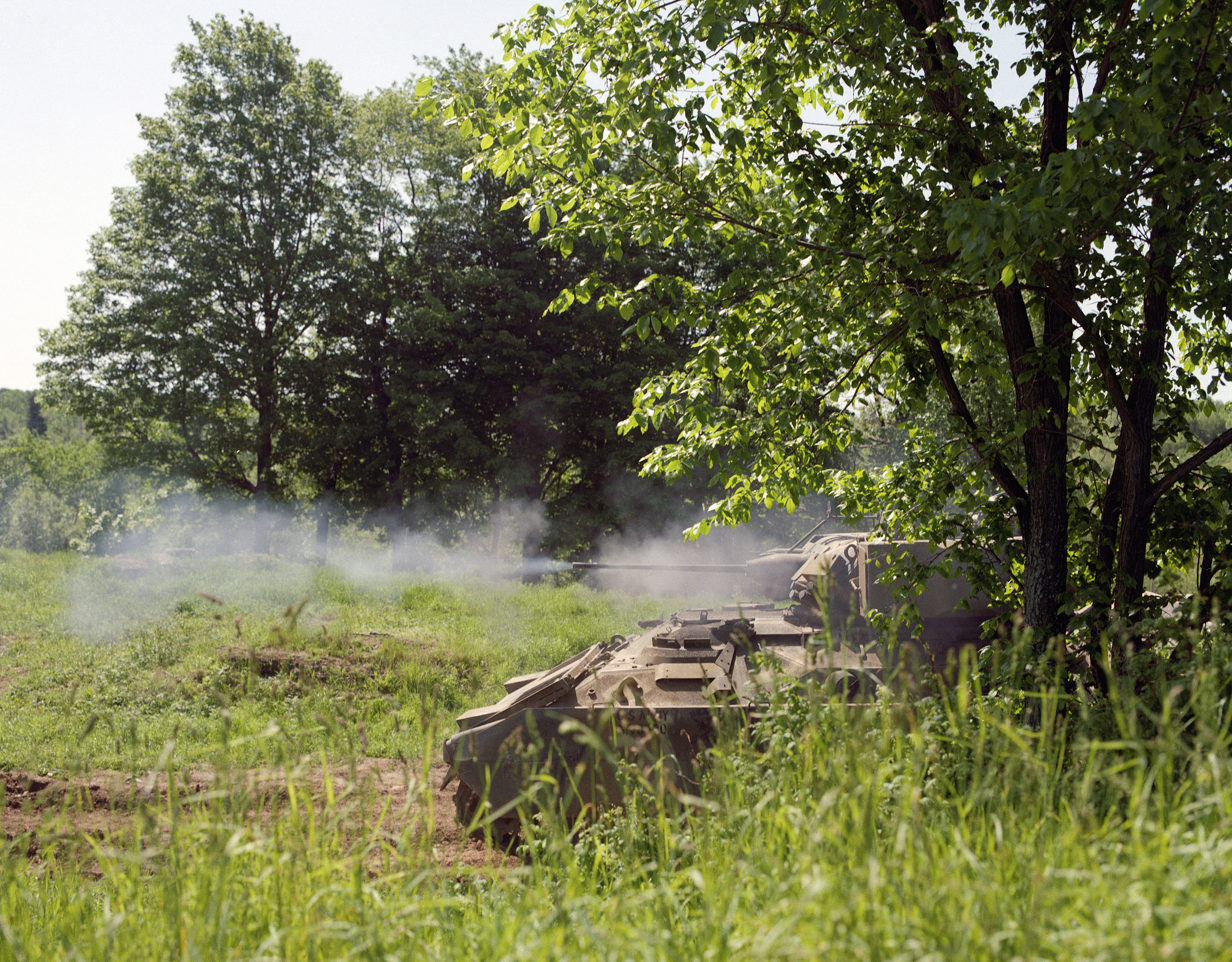
Bradley firing its 25 mm autocannon in 1984

The Bradley is equipped with the M242 25 mm autocannon as its main weapon. The M242 has a single barrel with an integrated dual-feed mechanism and remote feed selection. The Bradley carries 300 ready rounds in two ready boxes, one of 70 rounds – usually AP-type rounds, the other of 230 rounds – usually HE-type rounds, with another 600 rounds in storage. The two ready boxes allow a selectable mix of rounds, including the M791 APDS-T (Armor-Piercing Discarding Sabot (with) Tracer), and M792 HEI-T (High Explosive Incendiary (with) Tracer) rounds. The 25 mm automatic gun is primarily used for clearing bunkers and firing on lightly armored vehicles.

The 25 mm automatic gun is not the weapon of choice for engaging tanks, but vehicle commanders, crews, and CALL and Army Infantry Center personnel have reported isolated instances in which the 25 mm automatic gun disabled older generation tanks. However, Army Materiel Systems Analysis Activity (AMSAA) officials stated that, on the basis of their assessment of combat vehicles in the Persian Gulf war, for the 25 mm automatic gun to incapacitate a tank it would have to be hit at close range in its more vulnerable areas.

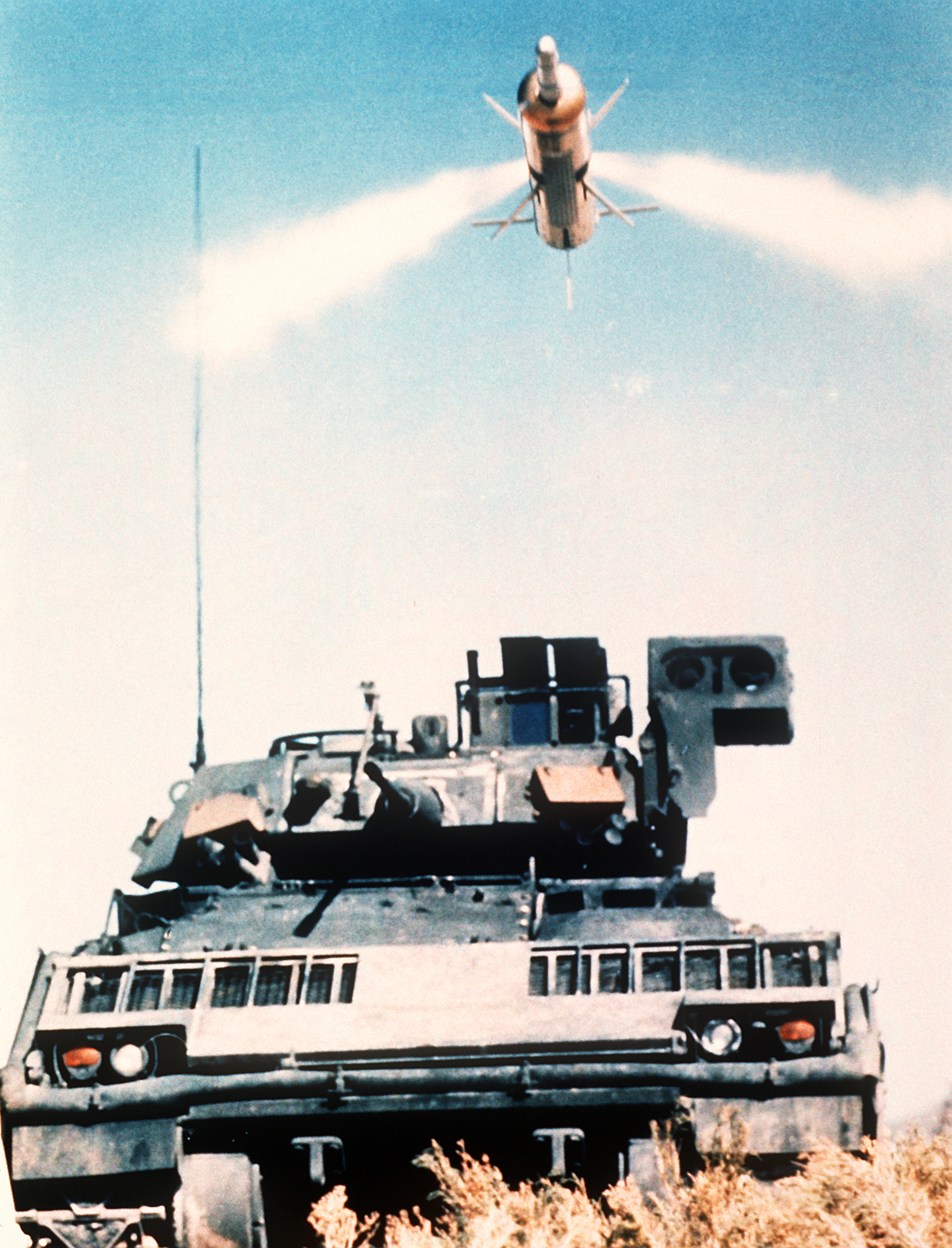
M2A1 Bradley firing a TOW II missile

Subsequent ammunition developments resulted in the M919 APFSDS-T (Armor-Piercing Fin Stabilized Discarding Sabot with Tracer) round, which contains a finned depleted-uranium penetrator similar in concept to armor-piercing munitions used in modern tanks. The M919 was used in combat during the 2003 invasion of Iraq.

It is also armed with an M240C machine gun mounted coaxially to the M242, with 2,200 rounds of 7.62 mm ammunition. For engaging heavier targets, such as tanks, the Bradley has a TOW missile system onboard. It was changed from the M2A1 model to fire TOW II missiles. M2 infantry Bradleys have firing ports for a number of M231 Firing Port Weapons (FPWs; modified M16 assault rifles), providing a button-up firing position to replace the top-side gunners on the old ACAV, though the M231 is rarely employed. Initial variants carried six, but the side ports were plated over with the new armor used on the A2 and A3 variants, leaving only the two rear-facing mounts in the loading ramp.

=== Protection ===
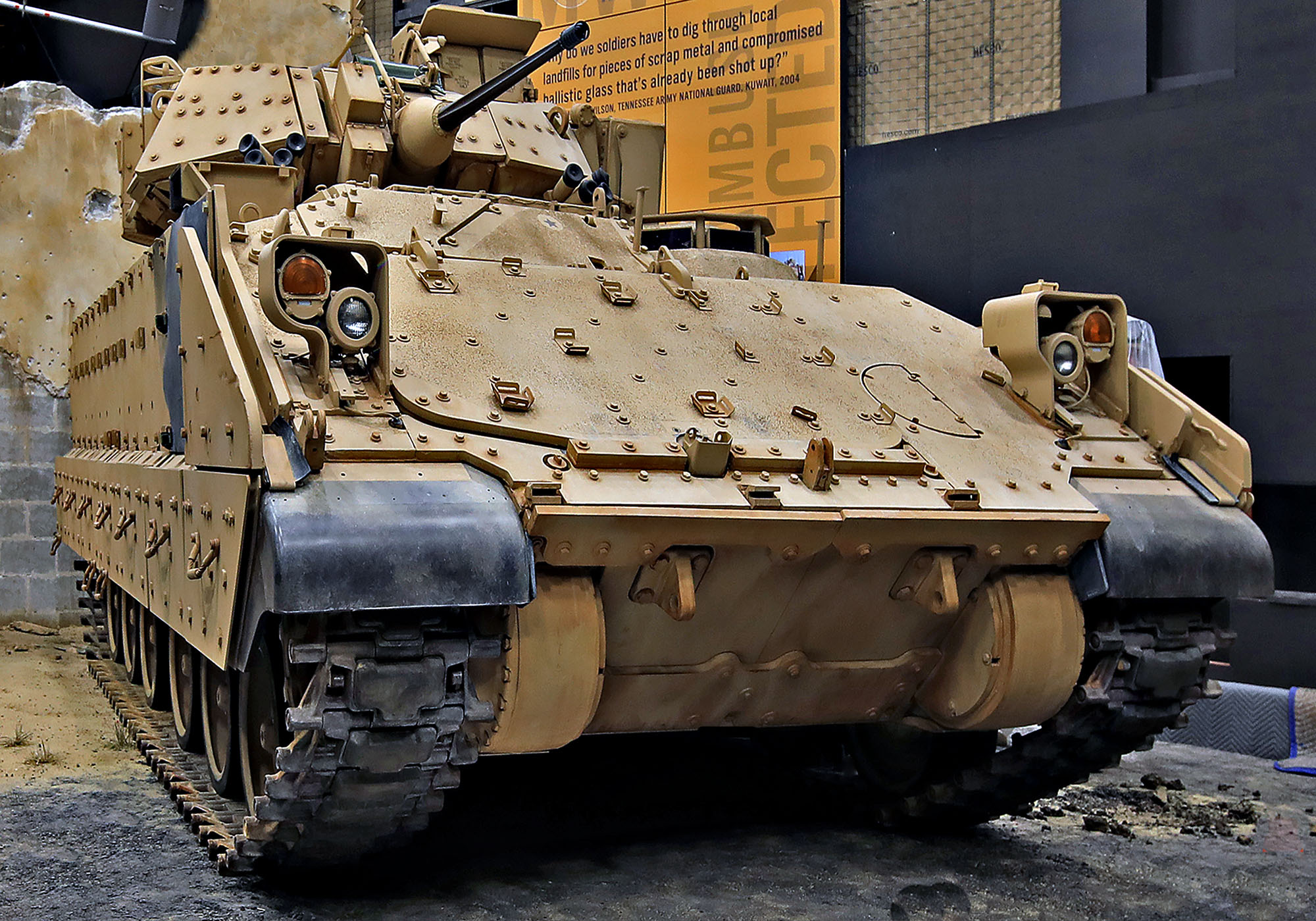
M2 Bradley on display at the National Museum of the United States Army, Fort Belvoir, Virginia

The M2's base armor consists of an all-around 1 inch (25.4 mm) thick aluminum hull (mix of no. 5083 and no. 7039 alloys), heavily sloped in the front and mostly vertical on the sides and rear. The bottom of the hull front has an additional 0.375 inch (9.5 mm) thick steel applique plate, primarily intended to protect against mines. Both sides of the vehicle have an additional 0.5 inch (12.7 mm) of high hardness steel armor consisting of two quarter-inch applique armor plates spaced 1 inch apart from each other, the first spaced 3.5 inches from the aluminum hull. The turret, unlike the hull, is armored only in steel. The M2A1 version has identical armor but adds a gas particulate filter unit for NBC protection. This armor offers protection against threats up to and including 14.5x114mm AP.

The M2A2 upgrade adds additional armor. More steel applique armor is added to the vehicle's front, requiring removal of the trim-vane. 1.25 inch (32 mm) steel plates were added to the hull sides, replacing the earlier applique armor, as well as to the front and sides of the turret. The new armor covered up the infantry firing ports on the vehicle's sides. Spaced laminate armor was added to the hull rear, and kevlar spall liners were added to critical areas. Options for ERA were also added. These armor upgrades added about 3 tons to the vehicle's weight.

=== Countermeasures ===
The use of aluminum armor and the storage of large quantities of ammunition in the vehicle initially raised questions about its combat survivability. Spaced laminate belts and high hardness steel skirts were added to later versions to improve armor protection, increasing overall weight to 33 tons. However, combat operations have not shown the Bradley to be deficient, with few losses. In friendly fire incidents in Desert Storm many crew members survived hits that totally destroyed lighter USMC LAV-25 vehicles.

All versions are equipped with two four-barreled M257 smoke grenade launchers on the front of the turret for creating defensive smoke screens, or firing chaff or flares.

In December 2018, the Army announced it would install an Israeli-made active protection system, the Iron Fist, on M2 Bradleys of one armored brigade to enhance protection of the aging Bradley against anti-tank rockets and missiles. However, the original configuration proved not to be sufficiently effective, delaying installation. Testing in 2022 of a reconfigured version called the Iron Fist Light Decoupled were more successful, and the Army intends to field a brigade set in 2025. Funding to equip several dozen Bradleys with Iron Fist was secured in early 2024.

=== Chassis ===
The Bradley has a welded aluminum unit or monocoque structure to which the armor is attached, mostly on the outside. The suspension is by torsion bars and cranks. Six small rubber rimmed, divided road wheels on each side straddle the location flanges sticking up from the tread. These were originally of aluminum, but were changed to steel as vehicle weight increased. The steel treads sit on flat hard rubber tires.

=== Mobility ===
The Bradley is highly capable in cross-country open terrain, in accordance with one of the main design objectives of keeping pace with the M1 Abrams main battle tank. Whereas the M113 would float without much preparation, the Bradley was initially designed to float by deploying a flotation curtain around the vehicle. This caused some drownings due to failures during its first trials. Flotation was no longer possible after armor upgrades.

=== Bradley squad and platoon organization ===
Dismounting from the Bradley

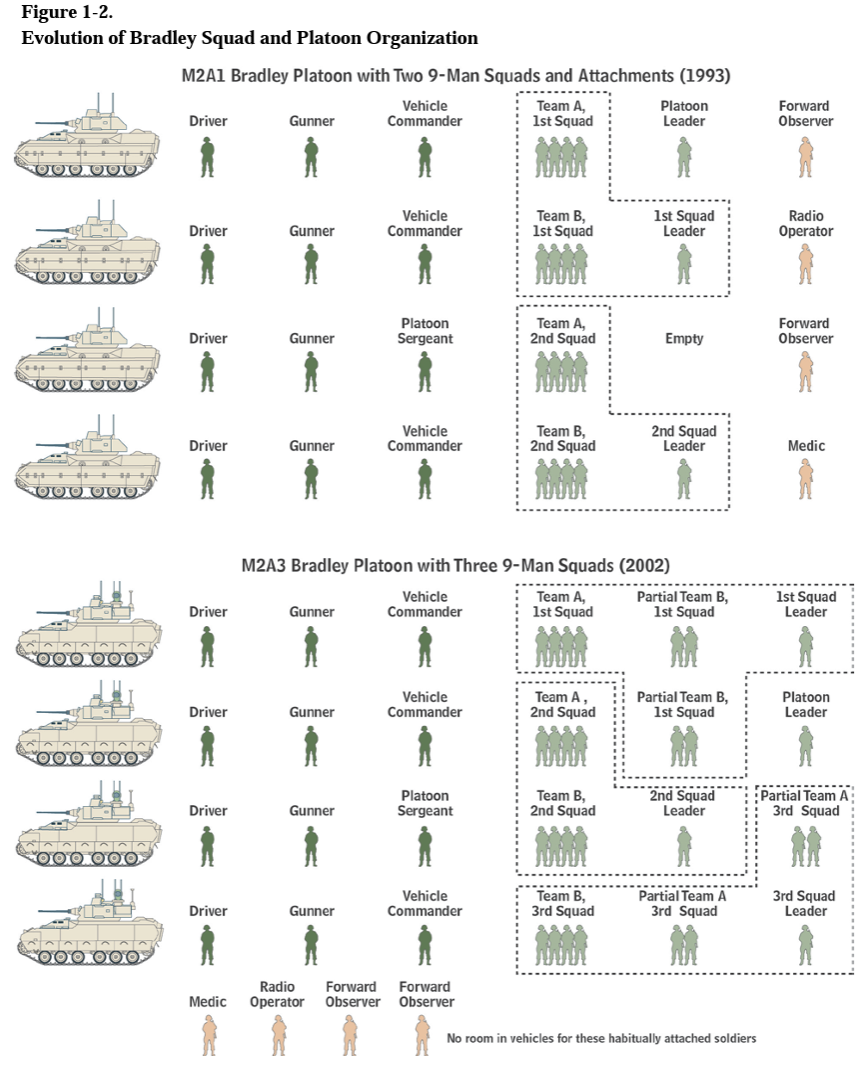
The evolution of Bradley squad and platoon organization. Squad organization in an M2A1 (top panel) and an M2A3 (bottom)

Since 1986, the U.S. Army has believed 9 to be the optimal number of individuals in a mechanized squad. Because of the limited room available for passengers in the Bradley, accommodating a full squad in Bradleys is accomplished by squad splitting.

A mechanized platoon consists of soldiers other than the squad members, and those soldiers must also ride in the vehicles. The original Bradley had room for 3 crew members and 6 passengers, called dismounts by the U.S. Army. An original mechanized platoon with four M2 Bradley vehicles included 12 crew and two infantry squads of 9 dismounts. Five other dismounts were also in the platoon and needed to be transported in the platoon's vehicles: the platoon leader, a radio-telephone operator, a medic, and two forward observers whose role is to call for support fire from artillery and aircraft. Together, they filled 35 of the 36 available spaces in the platoon's four vehicles. In the later M2A2 and M2A3 versions of the Bradley, the Army rearranged the interior stowage and created space for an extra dismount in each vehicle, resulting in spaces for 7 dismounts in each vehicle and a total of 40 soldiers in the four-vehicle platoon. With the extra men, the Army reorganized the Bradley platoon into 3 squads with 9 dismounts each. The Bradley crew of 12 stayed the same, thus there was room in the Bradleys for only one more dismount—the platoon leader. That new configuration did not leave room for the medic, platoon radio-telephone operator, or forward observers. In actual practice, however, units rarely have all the men they are assigned, so there is usually room for those extra soldiers.

Even with the extra space in the revised Bradleys, the squads were split among more than one Bradley. A split squad can be difficult to organize and control immediately after dismounting, especially when under fire and in complex terrain. The Army seeks to avoid that difficulty by requiring the GCV to carry the full 9-man squad. A four-vehicle GCV platoon will have room for 12 crew members and 36 dismounts. With three squads fully occupying three GCVs, the fourth GCV will have room for the platoon leader, forward observers, radio-telephone operator, and medic.

== History ==
=== Production history ===
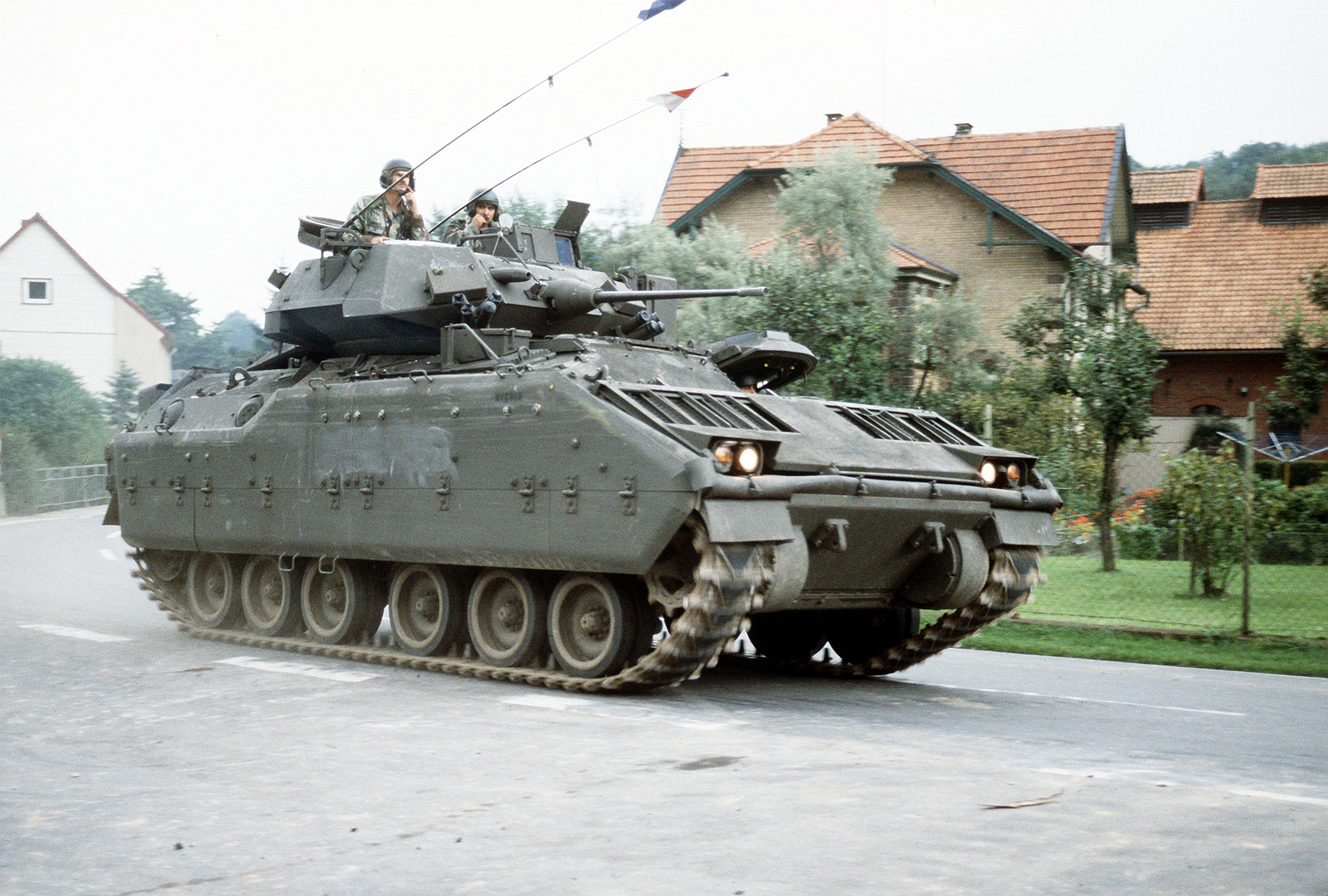
United States Army M2 Bradley in 1985, Germany.

The M2, which was named after World War II General Omar Bradley, carries a crew of three and a six-man dismountable infantry squad.

The vehicle entered service with the U.S. Army in 1981, and 4,641 M2 variants have been produced since.

Even after the troubled development history of the Bradley, additional problems occurred after production started, as later detailed by Air Force Colonel James G. Burton, who took part in the design and fielding process. Burton advocated the use of comprehensive live fire tests against fully loaded military vehicles to check for survivability. The Army and Navy agreed and established the Joint Live Fire testing program in 1984. When testing the Bradley, disagreements occurred between Burton and the Ballistic Research Laboratory (BRL) at Aberdeen Proving Grounds, which preferred smaller, more controlled, "building block" tests that could be used to improve the databases used to model vehicle survivability, as opposed to full up tests with random shots, which reduce the possibility of bias but produced little useful statistical data.

Burton insisted on a series of "overmatch" tests in which weapon systems would be fired at the Bradley that were known to be able to easily penetrate its armor. Burton saw attempts to avoid such tests as dishonest, while the BRL saw them as wasteful as they already knew the vehicle would fail. The disagreements became so contentious that a congressional inquiry was set up. As a result of the tests, additional improvements to vehicle survivability were added.

By May 2000, 4,641 M2s had been produced for the U.S. Army.

Saudi Arabia stated an interest in acquiring the Bradley in 1989, and began importing the vehicle in 1990. Bradley production concluded in 1995. A total of 6,785 M2/M3 Bradleys were produced, including 400 for Saudi Arabia.

=== Combat history ===
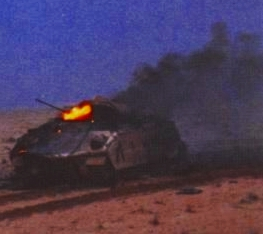
A Bradley IFV burns after being hit during the Battle of 73 Easting, one of only three Bradleys lost to the Iraqis, February 1991.

During the 1990–1991 Persian Gulf War, M2 Bradleys destroyed more Iraqi armored vehicles than the M1 Abrams. Twenty Bradleys were lost, three to enemy fire and 17 due to friendly fire incidents. Another 12 were damaged. To remedy some problems that were identified as contributing factors in the friendly fire incidents, infrared identification panels and other marking/identification measures were added to the Bradleys.

In the Iraq War from 2003, the Bradley proved somewhat vulnerable to improvised explosive device (IED) and rocket-propelled grenade (RPG) attacks, but casualties were light; the doctrine was to allow the crew to escape at the expense of the vehicle. In early 2006, total combat losses had been between 55 and 100 Bradleys; by the end of the war, about 150 Bradleys had been destroyed.

The M2A3 variant began to replace the M3A3 cavalry fighting vehicles in US Army armored reconnaissance units in 2014, as the increased ammunition loads carried by the M3A3s reduced the number of scouts that could be transported. In 2016, a reorganisation of reconnaissance unit structures and compositions saw large-scale replacements of Humvees within these units with M2A3s, increasing the tactical mobility and maneuver warfare capabilities of US Army armored reconnaissance brigades.

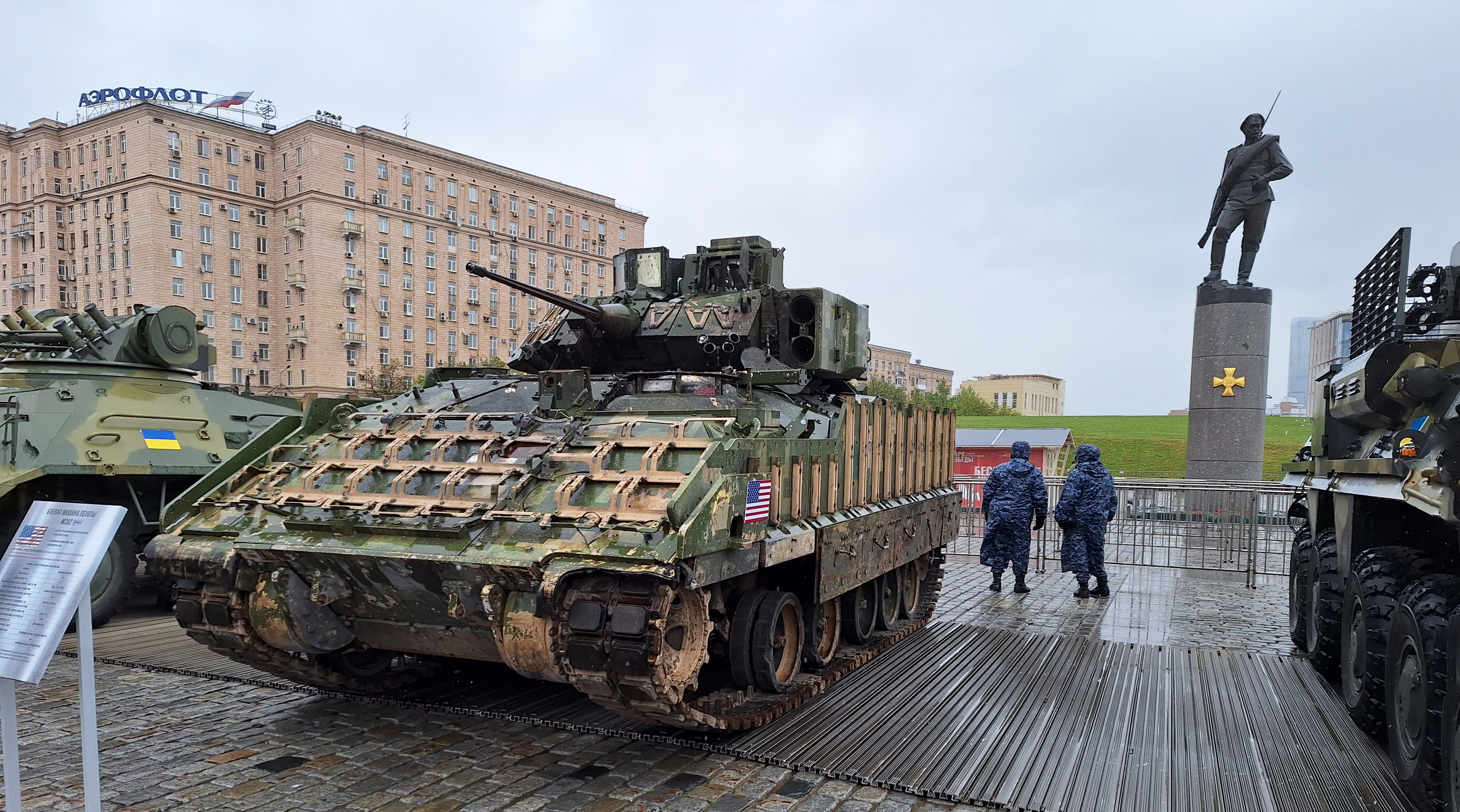
A Bradley IFV captured by Russian forces, on display at Russian army trophies exhibition in Moscow.

On 5 January 2023, the Pentagon confirmed that 50 Bradleys were included as part of a $3 billion package of assistance to Ukraine during the 2022 Russian invasion of Ukraine. France had promised to send AMX-10 RC and ACMAT Bastions. Germany also committed to sending the Marder (IFV). The Bradleys were sent because the U.S. had determined that Ukrainian forces were proficient in maintenance and sustainment of such AFVs. Another 59 vehicles were included in another package later that month. Bradleys were first shown to be in Ukrainian service in mid-April 2023.

Ukraine first employed M2 Bradleys in combat during the 2023 Ukrainian counteroffensive beginning in early June 2023. On 8 June, Russian drone footage showed multiple Bradleys damaged and destroyed in Zaporizhzhia Oblast along with a Leopard 2A6. Several more were lost to mines and ATGMs while attempting to breach Russian defensive lines. Ukrainian soldiers lauded the survivability of the Bradley, saying it protected them from hits that would have been lethal if sustained by a Soviet APC, and that many of the vehicles that became disabled from combat damage could be recovered and repaired. Ukraine's deputy defense minister Hanna Maliar said on Telegram that one M2 Bradley assigned to the 47th Mechanized Brigade had been able to destroy two Russian T-72 tanks in a single engagement. On 5 November, pictures began to circulate on Russian social media of a captured M2A2 Bradley near the villages of Avdiivka and Stepove in Donetsk Oblast, bearing the BRAT (Bradley Reactive Armor Tiles) protection system. Footage of the captured Bradley was broadcast on Russia’s Channel 1, in a segment showing several masked members of the Russian recovery crews examining the vehicle.

Ukrainian forces have used M2 Bradleys in ambushes and defensive fighting around Avdiivka. The 25 mm autocannon has been used to destroy three Russian MT-LB vehicles in one engagement, while also engaging supporting Russian infantry. The enhanced optics allow for night attacks.

On 12 January 2024, footage emerged of a pair of Ukrainian M2A2 Bradleys from the 47th Mechanized Brigade engaging and disabling a Russian T-90M Proryv tank at close range in Stepove, Ukraine. In an engagement which lasted ten minutes, the two Bradleys were able to incapacitate the tank by firing at the mechanism which turned the tank's turret, causing it to spin uncontrollably and render it inoperable.

As of November 2025, 185 Ukrainian Bradleys had been confirmed to have been lost by photos or videos; 96 of them destroyed and the rest damaged, captured, or abandoned on the battlefield.

In April 2025, Russian military experts examined a captured M2A2 ODS-SA Bradley and testing found it superior to a Soviet-era BMP-3. Finding the Bradley to better protected from gunfire, shell splinters and land mines. The 25 mm cannon had “reportedly double” the range of the BMP-3 30mm cannon. By contrast, Sergey Chemezov, CEO of Rostec, acknowledged the Bradley's protection and troop-compartment comfort but criticized Russian experts for claiming its superiority over the BMP-3, citing survivability and operational limitations as key reasons.

In October 2025, the former Chief of the General Staff of the Armed Forces of the Russian Federation, General Yuri Baluyevsky, and Ruslan Pukhov, Director of the Center for Analysis of Strategies and Technologies, described the Bradley as an "ideal vehicle" for the war in Ukraine.

=== Replacement ===
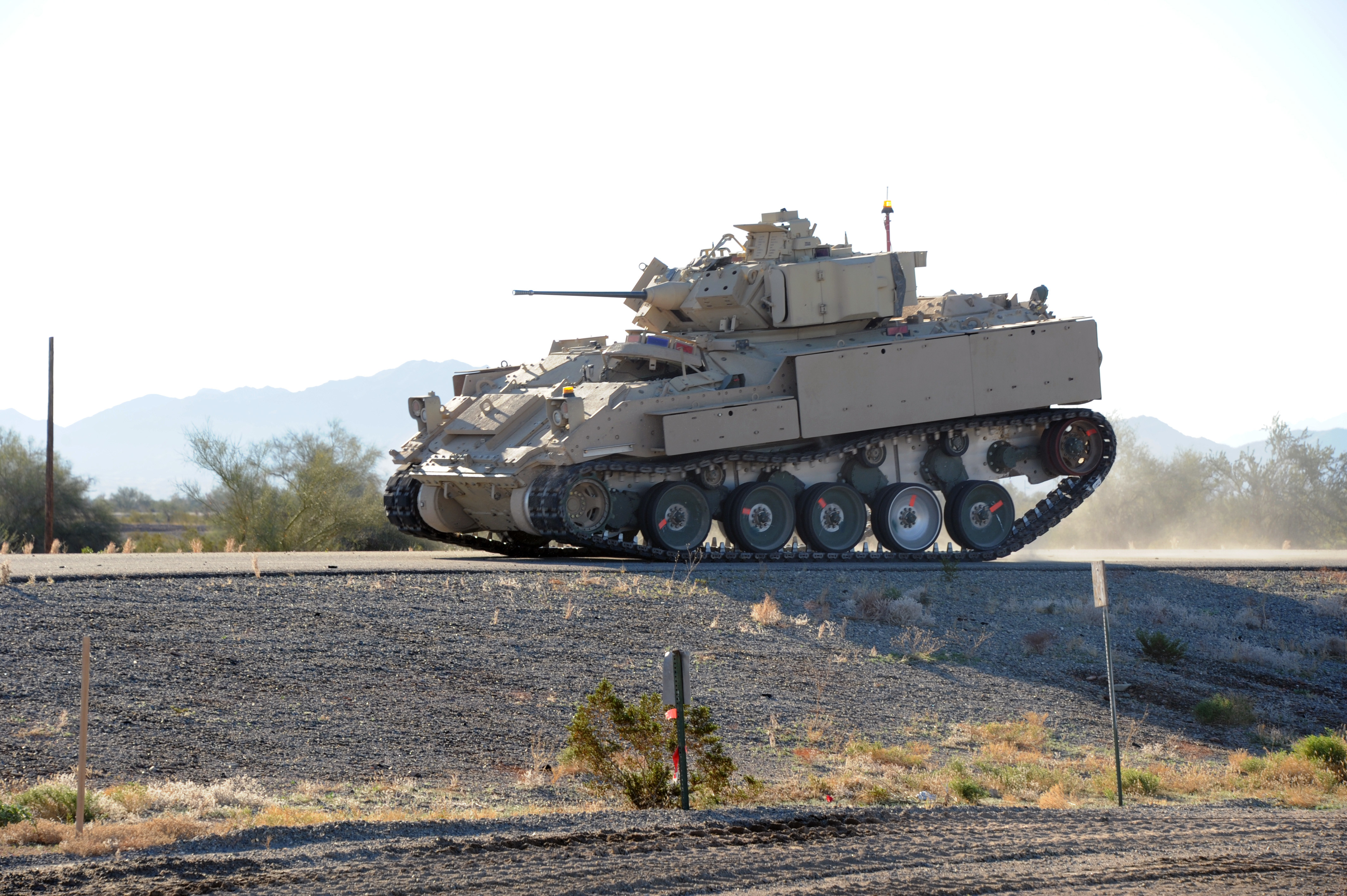
Army tests of an Advanced Running Gear using a Bradley Fighting Vehicle as a surrogate for the OMFV

U.S. Army efforts to replace the Bradley began in the mid-1980s under the Armored Systems Modernization program. The Army studied creating several vehicle variants under a common heavy chassis to replace main battle tanks and Bradleys. This effort was canceled in 1992 due to the collapse of the Soviet Union.

The U.S. Army began the Future Combat Systems (FCS) Manned Ground Vehicles program in 1999. This family of 18-ton lightweight tracked vehicles centered around a common chassis. It would consist of eight variants, including infantry carriers, scouting vehicles and main battle tanks. FCS was canceled in 2009 due to budget cuts.

In 2010, the Army began the Ground Combat Vehicle program to replace the M2 Bradley. Entries from BAE and General Dynamics were selected for evaluation. Concerns grew around the vehicle's proposed weight of around 70 tons. The GCV program was cancelled in 2014 due to sequestration budget cuts.

In June 2018, the Army established the Next Generation Combat Vehicle (NGCV) program to replace the M2 Bradley. In October 2018, the program was redesignated as the Optionally Manned Fighting Vehicle (OMFV). This program placed much of the cost burden of development on contractors, causing many competitors to drop out. In February 2020, the Army restarted the program, promising to take on more responsibility for funding. American Rheinmetall Vehicles and General Dynamics Land Systems were selected in June 2023 to move forward with the program, with a winner to be selected in 2027 and the XM30 Mechanized Infantry Combat Vehicle planned to be fielded by 2029.

== Variants ==
=== M2 ===
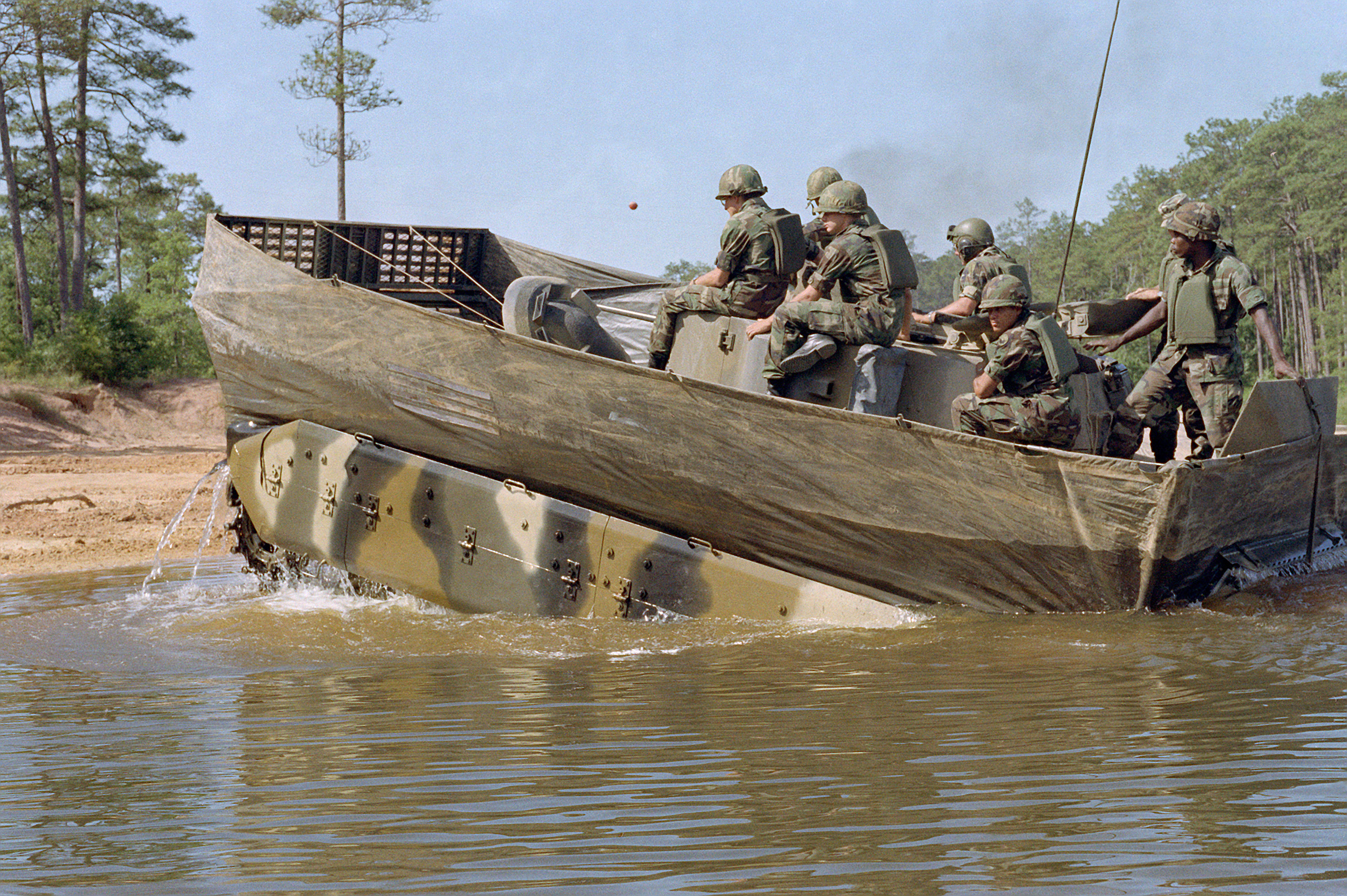
A M2 Bradley configured for swimming, Fort Benning, June 1983

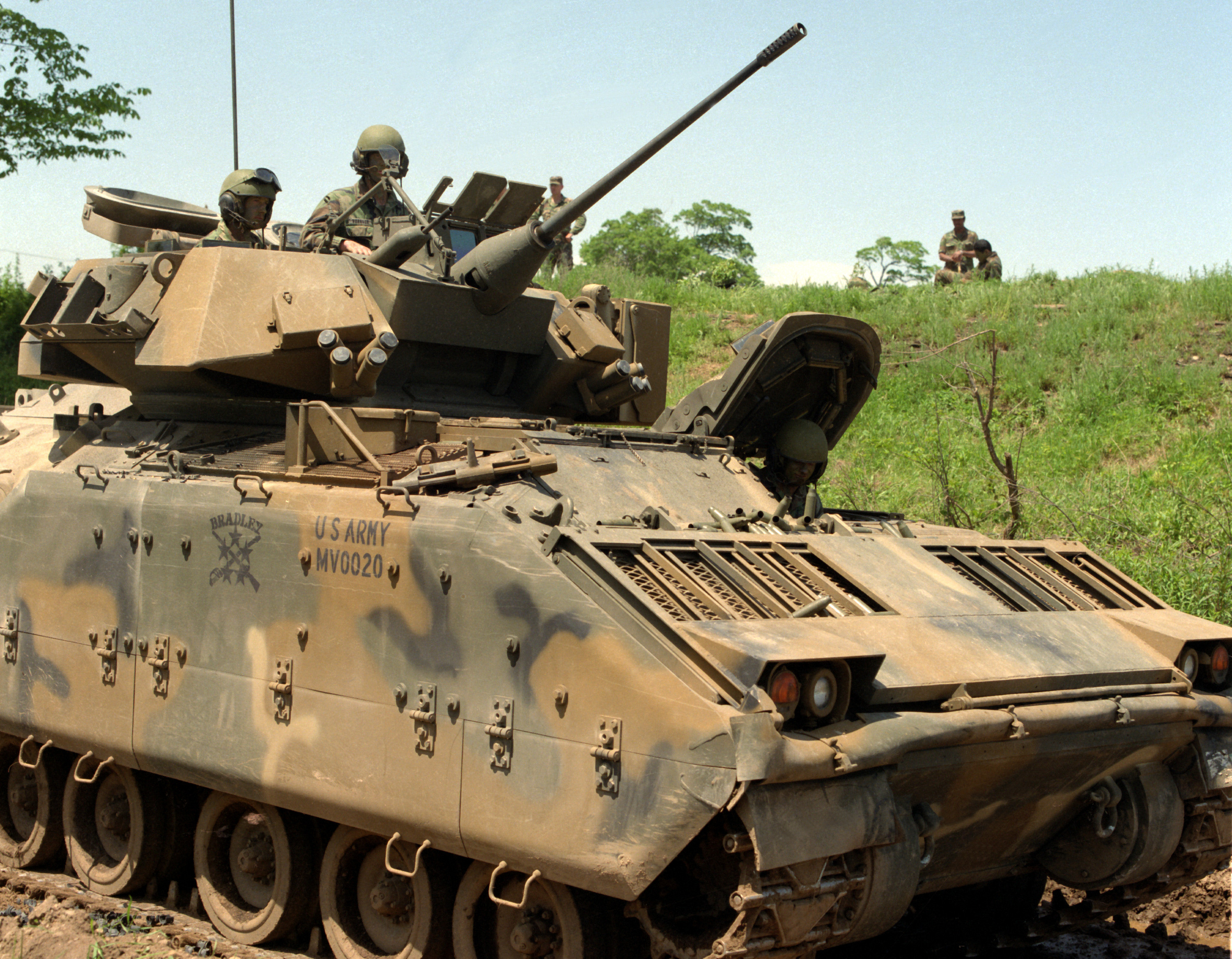
An early M2 Bradley during Exercise Shadow Hawk '87

The M2 was the basic production model, designed to carry 10 person teams, first fielded in 1981. The M2 can be identified by its standard TOW missile system, steel laminate armor, and 500 horsepower (370 kW) Cummins VT903 engine with HMPT-500 hydromechanical transmission. Basic features included an integrated sight unit for the M242 25 mm gun, and thermal imaging system. The M2 was amphibious with the use of a "swim barrier" or "flotation screen" and was transportable by C-141 Starlifter and C-5 Galaxy aircraft. All M2 vehicles have been upgraded to improved standards. The M2 armor protects the vehicle through a full 360 degrees against 14.5 mm armor-piercing incendiary (API) ammunition.

The turret was offset to the right to maximize the room in the passenger compartment. Six infantry soldiers for dismounted fighting were held in the passenger compartment. Vision for the troops was provided through three periscopes placed between the rear ramp and the cargo hatch just behind the turret, as well as two periscopes on each side of the hull above the side firing ports. The passenger compartment held up to five TOW or Dragon missile reloads. The side and rear hull armor consisted of two 0.25 in (6.4 mm) steel plates one inch apart and 3.5 in (89 mm) away from the aluminum armor. The hull top, bottom, and front consisted of 5083 aluminum armor, and 0.357 in (9.1 mm) steel armor was added to the front third of the hull bottom to increase mine protection.

=== M3 ===
The M3 Bradley CFV is very similar to the M2 Bradley IFV (Infantry Fighting Vehicle) and is fielded with the same two-man 25 mm Bushmaster cannon turret with the coaxial 7.62 mm machine gun. It only varies from the M2 in a few subtle ways and by role. The M3 is classified as an armored reconnaissance and scout vehicle and does away with the firing ports found in the M2 series. The M3 carries more TOW missiles as well as more ammunition for its 25 mm and 7.62 mm guns.

=== M2A1 ===
Introduced in 1986, the A1 variant included an improved TOW II missile system, a Gas Particulate Filter Units (GPFU) NBC system, and a fire-suppression system. In 1992, the M2A1s had begun being remanufactured to upgraded standards. The GPFU system was only connected to the vehicle commander, driver, and gunner, while the infantry squad had to use their own from MOPP suits. A seventh infantryman was added just behind the center of the turret.

=== M2A2 ===
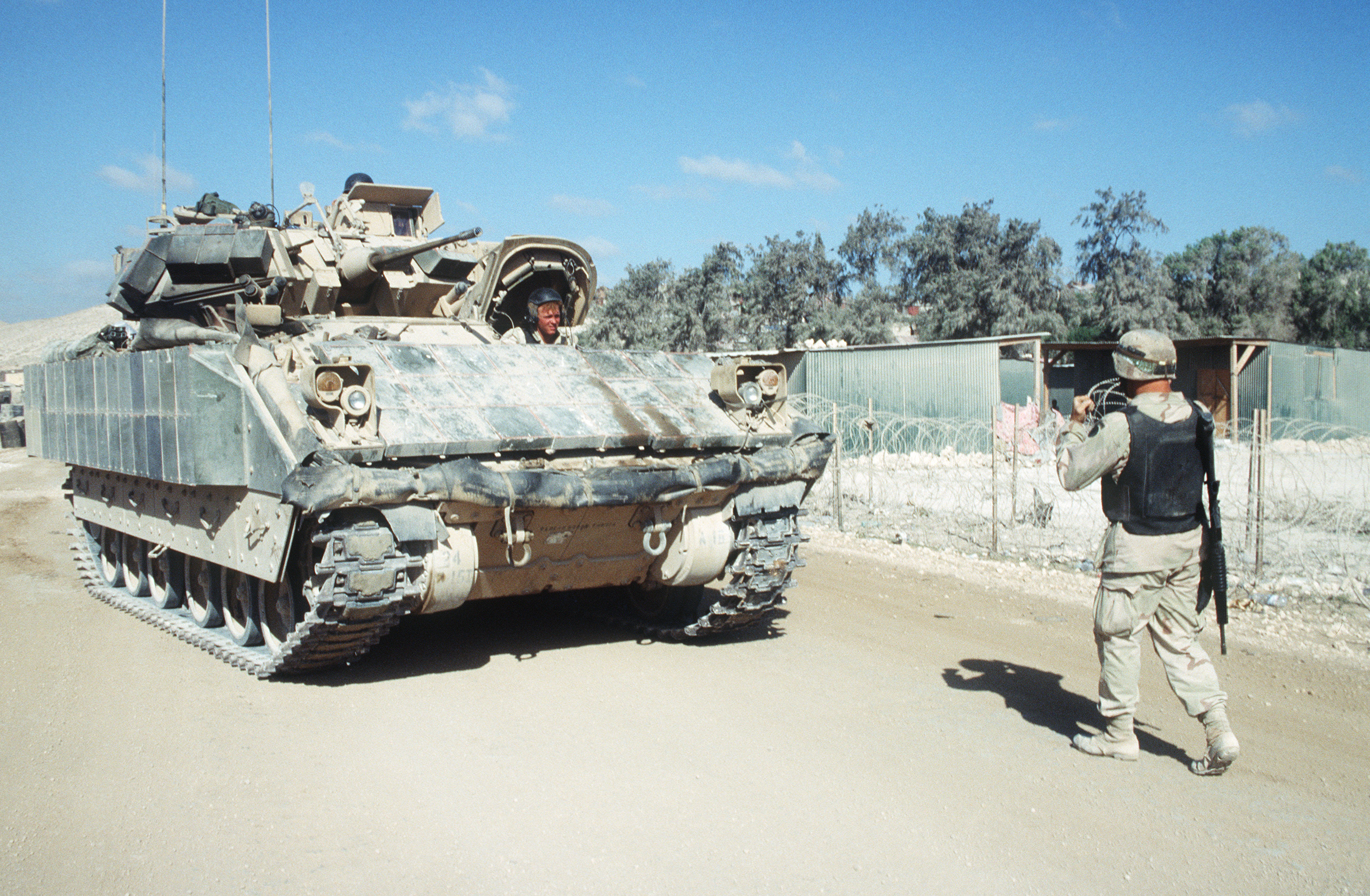
A U.S. Army M2A2 equipped with explosive reactive armor deployed to Somalia to provide security for UNOSOM II, 1994.

Introduced in 1988, the A2 received an improved 600 horsepower (447 kW) engine with an HMPT-500-3 Hydromechanical transmission. Armor was improved, both passive and the ability to mount explosive reactive armor. The new armor protects the Bradley against 30 mm APDS rounds and RPGs, or similar anti-armor weapons. The new armor eliminated the trim vane that made the Bradley amphibious and covered up the side firing ports. Spaced laminate armor was installed to the hull rear. Spaced laminate track skirts protected the lower hull.

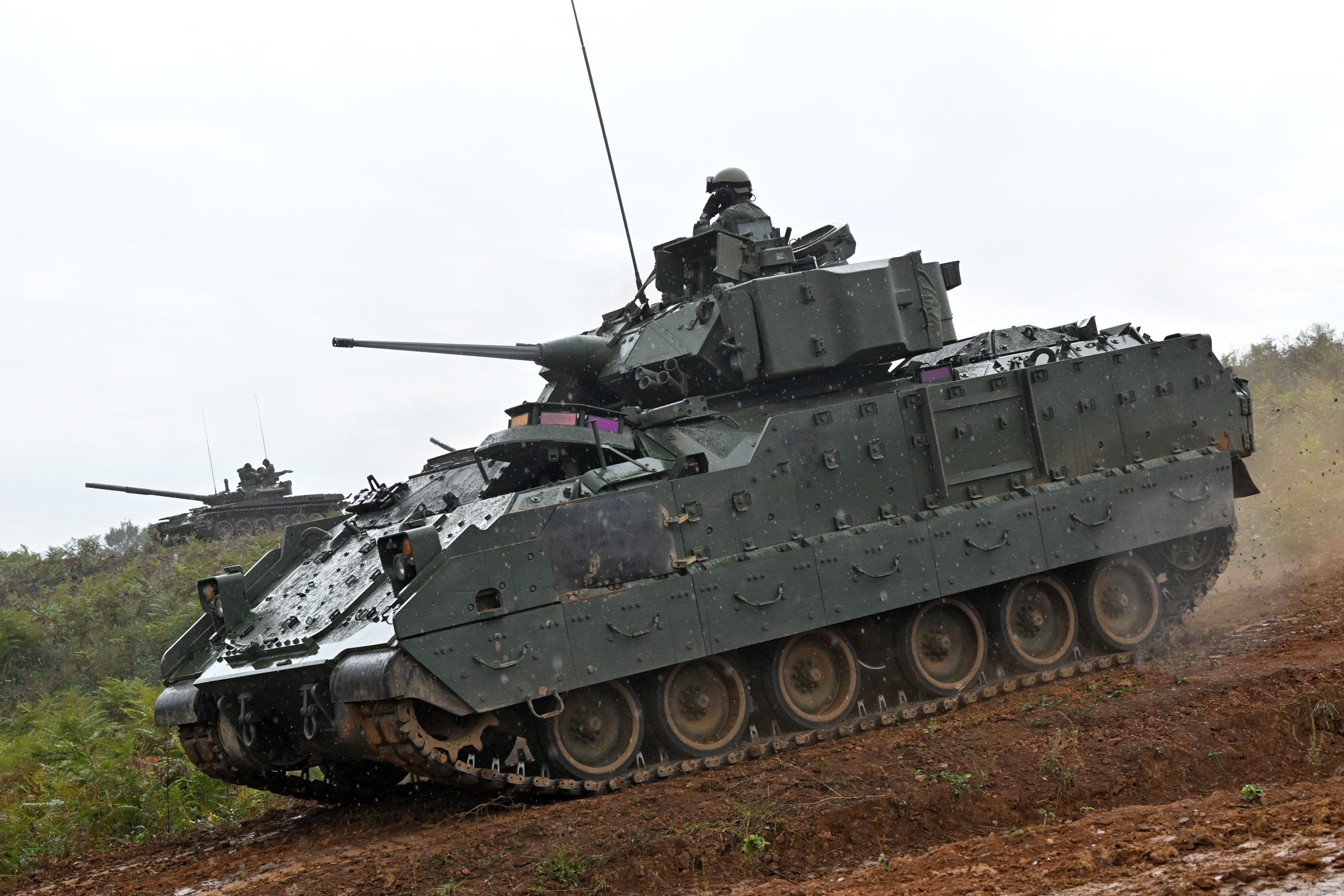
A Croatian Army M2A2 ODS Bradley.

A semicircular shield was attached to the turret rear to add more stowage space, as well as act as spaced armor. Kevlar spall liners were added to critical areas. The troop carrying number was reduced to six, eliminating the periscope position behind the driver. After live firing testing, the seating and stowage arrangements were redrawn. These upgrades raised the cumulative gross weight of the vehicle to 30,519 kg (67,282 lb (30.037 long tons; 33.641 short tons)). The M2A2 was qualified to be transported by the C-17 Globemaster III. M2A2s were all eventually modified to the M2A2 ODS or M2A3 standard.

==== M2A2 ODS/ODS-E ====
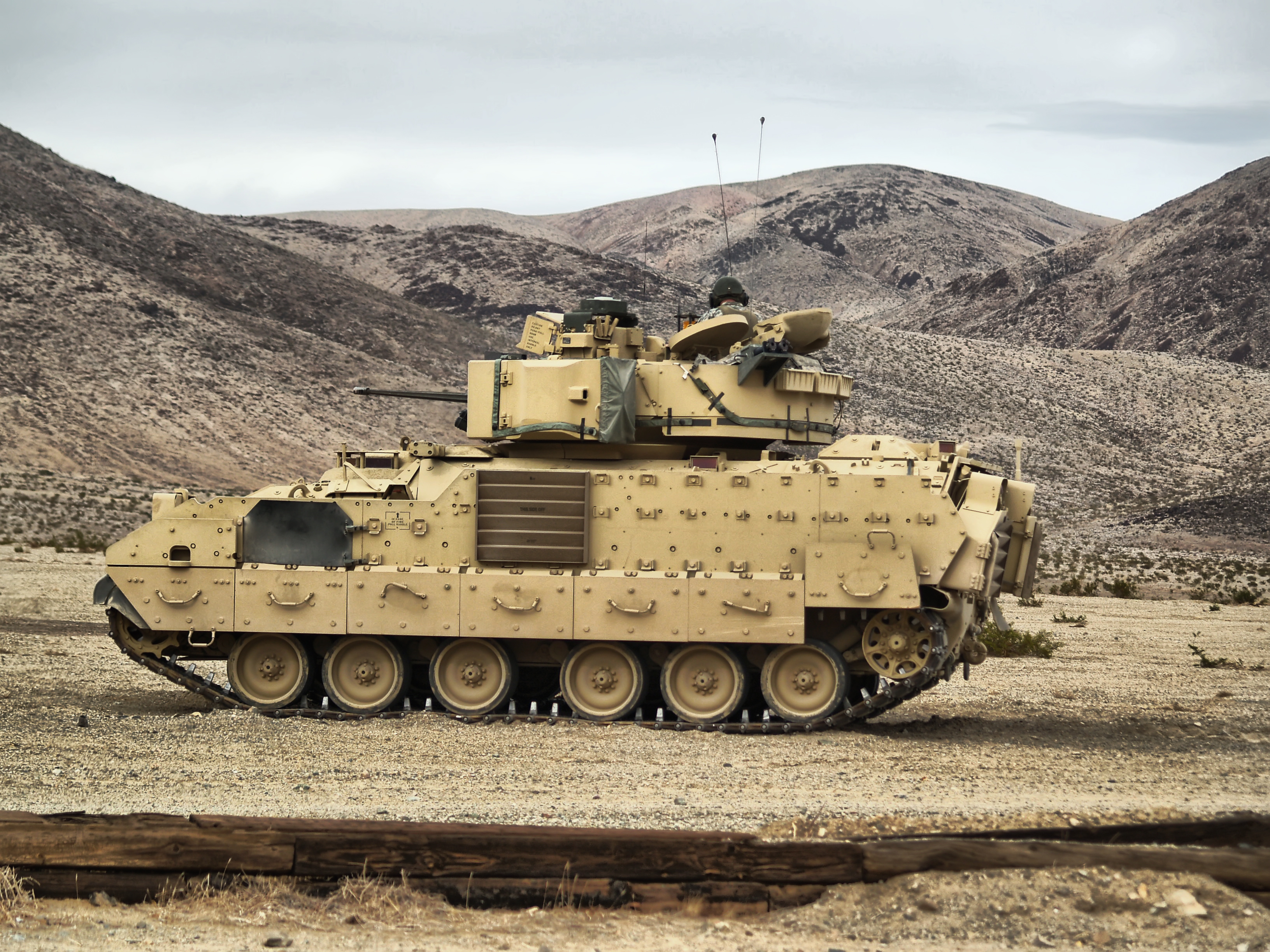
A U.S. Army M2A2 at the National Training Center, Fort Irwin.

The "Operation Desert Storm" and "Operation Desert Storm-Engineer" improvements were based on lessons learned during the first Gulf War in 1991. The major improvements included an eye-safe laser rangefinder (ELRF), a tactical navigation system (TACNAV) incorporating the Precision Lightweight GPS Receiver (PLGR) and the Digital Compass Systems (DCS), a missile countermeasure device designed to defeat first-generation wire-guided missiles, and the Force XXI Battle Command Brigade and Below (FBCB2) Battlefield Command Information System.

The internal stowage was further improved and a thermal imaging system was added for the driver. The infantry squad was again increased to seven men, six of whom sat facing each other on two 3-man benches in the passenger compartment, with the seventh back in the position behind the turret. An MRE ('Meal, Ready-to-Eat') heater was added to the vehicle to assist in the preparation of food. With the retirement of the Dragon missile, the vehicle had the option of carrying Javelin anti-tank missiles.

=== M2A3 ===
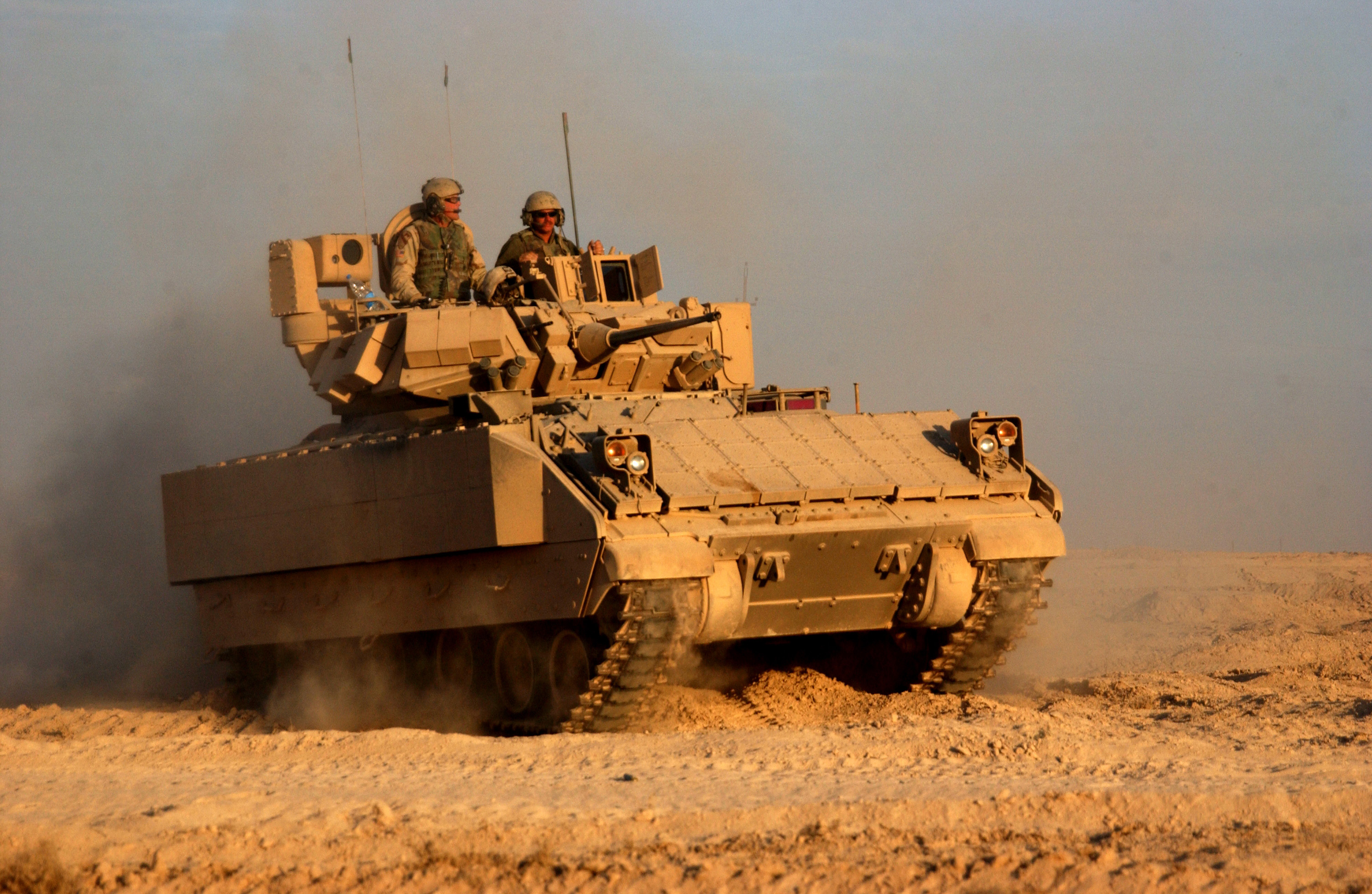
A M2A3 Bradley operating near Fallujah, Iraq, in November 2004. The main recognition feature of the M2/M3A3 is the Commander's Independent Viewer (CIV), at the right rear of the turret.

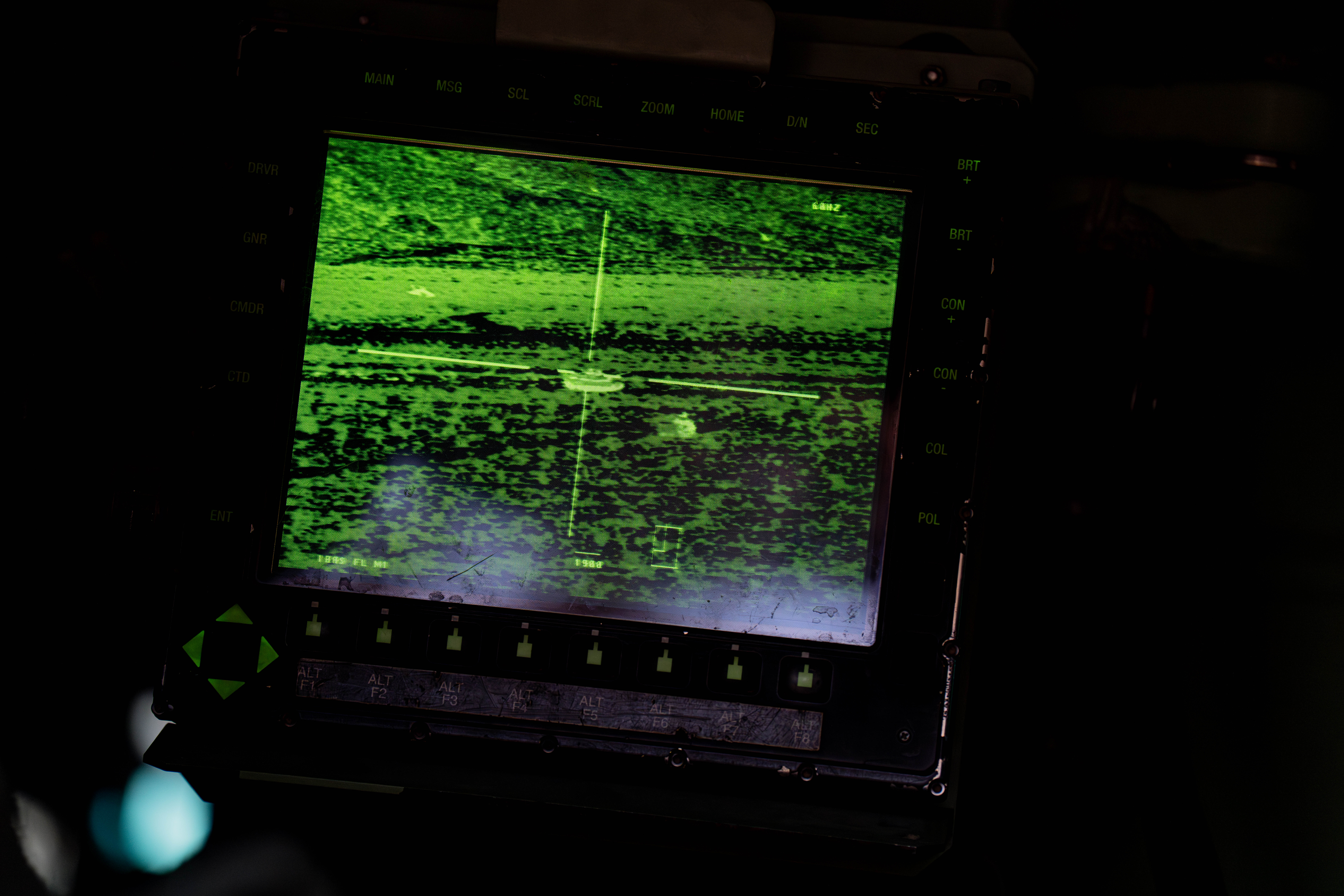
M2A3 Bradley thermal sight

Introduced in 2000, the A3 upgrades make the Bradley IFV totally digital, with upgraded or improved existing electronics systems throughout, improving target acquisition and fire control, navigation, and situational awareness. The survivability of the vehicle was upgraded with a series of armor improvements, again both passive and reactive, as well as improved fire-suppression systems and NBC equipment.

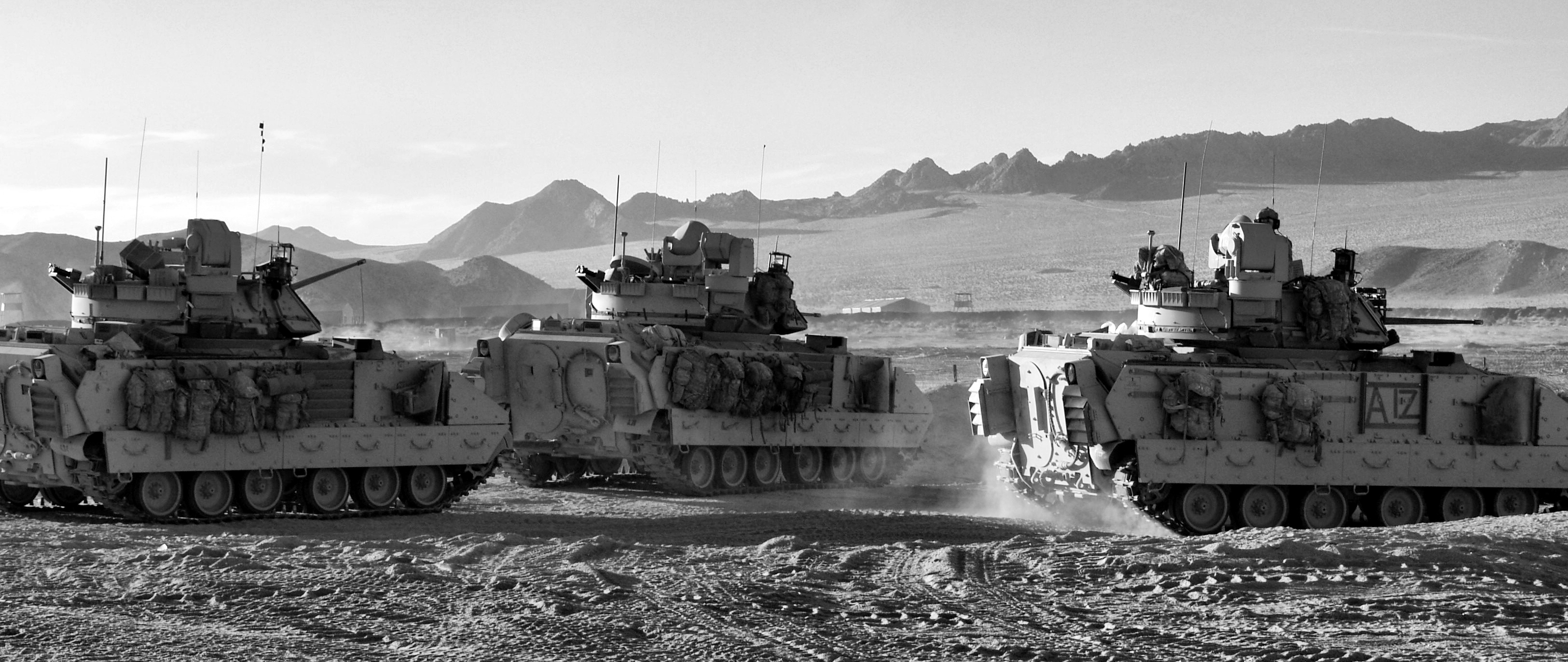
Three M2A3 Bradleys exit an OCCD at the start of a Patrol at Fort Irwin, California.

The A3 Bradley incorporates the Improved Bradley Acquisition Subsystem (IBAS) and the Commander's Independent Viewer (CIV). Both include a second-generation forward looking infrared (FLIR) and an electro-optical/TV imaging system. The IBAS has direct-view optics (DVO) and the eye-safe laser rangefinder (ELRF). The CIV allows the commander to scan for targets and maintain situational awareness while remaining under armor, and without interfering with the gunner's acquisition and engagement of targets.

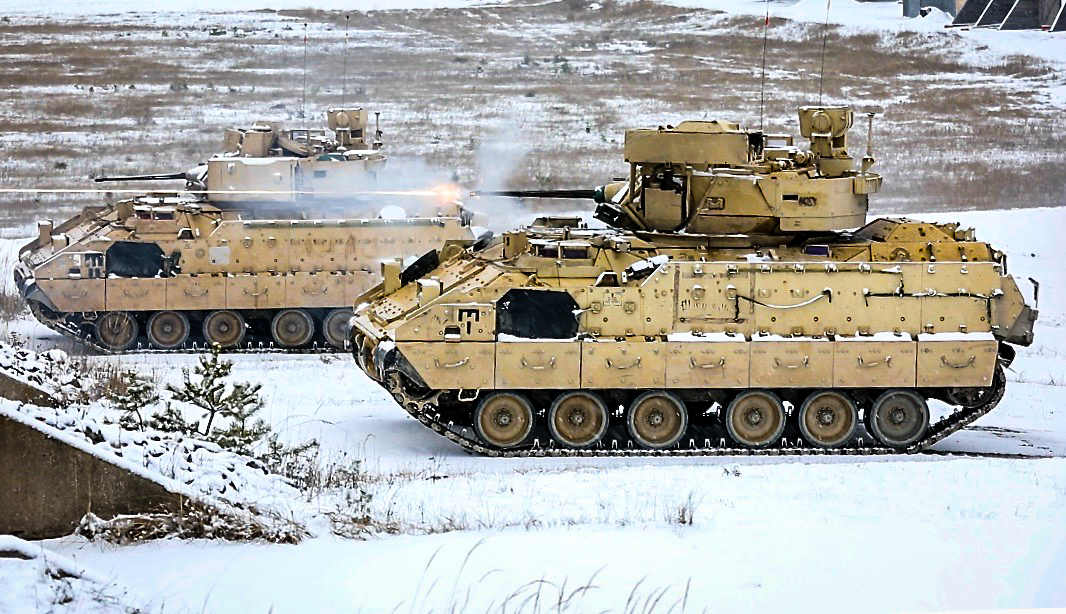
A pair of M2A3 Bradleys firing their M242 chain guns in a live fire exercise.

The A3's fire control software (FCSW) combines laser range, environmental readings, ammunition type, and turret control inputs to automatically elevate the gun for range and to automatically generate a kinematic lead solution if a target is moving. This functionality, very similar to that of the M1A2 Abrams, allows the gunner or commander to center the reticule on a moving target, lase the target, and achieve a first-round-hit, without the need to fire sensing rounds and adjust aim. The FCSW incorporates a thermal aided target tracker (ATT) function that can track two targets in the FLIR field of view and switch between them, primarily intended for employing TOW missiles against moving vehicles. The FCSW allows the turret and gunner's sights to be slewed automatically onto a target that has been designated with the CIV.

The A3 Bradley uses a position-navigation subsystem that incorporates a global positioning system (GPS), an inertial navigation unit (INU), and a vehicle motion sensor (MVS), which, in addition to allowing accurate own-vehicle navigation, allows accurate position reporting and the ability to hand-off designated targets to other units via FBCB2.

The Commander's Tactical Display (CTD) presents information from the FBCB2 and the vehicle navigation systems on a moving-map display. This allows the commander to communicate via text over FBCB2, and allows him to check vehicle built-in test (BIT) information and access various other information. The Squad Leader's Display (SLD) in the infantry compartment improves the situational awareness of the passengers by allowing them to view navigational information from the FBCB2 and imagery from the IBAS, CIV, or Driver's Vision Enhancer (DVE) to familiarize themselves with their surroundings prior to dismounting.

The M2A3 Bradley II, and an M2A3 Bradley variant used in Iraq, were included in the GCV Analysis of Alternatives.

=== M2A4 ===
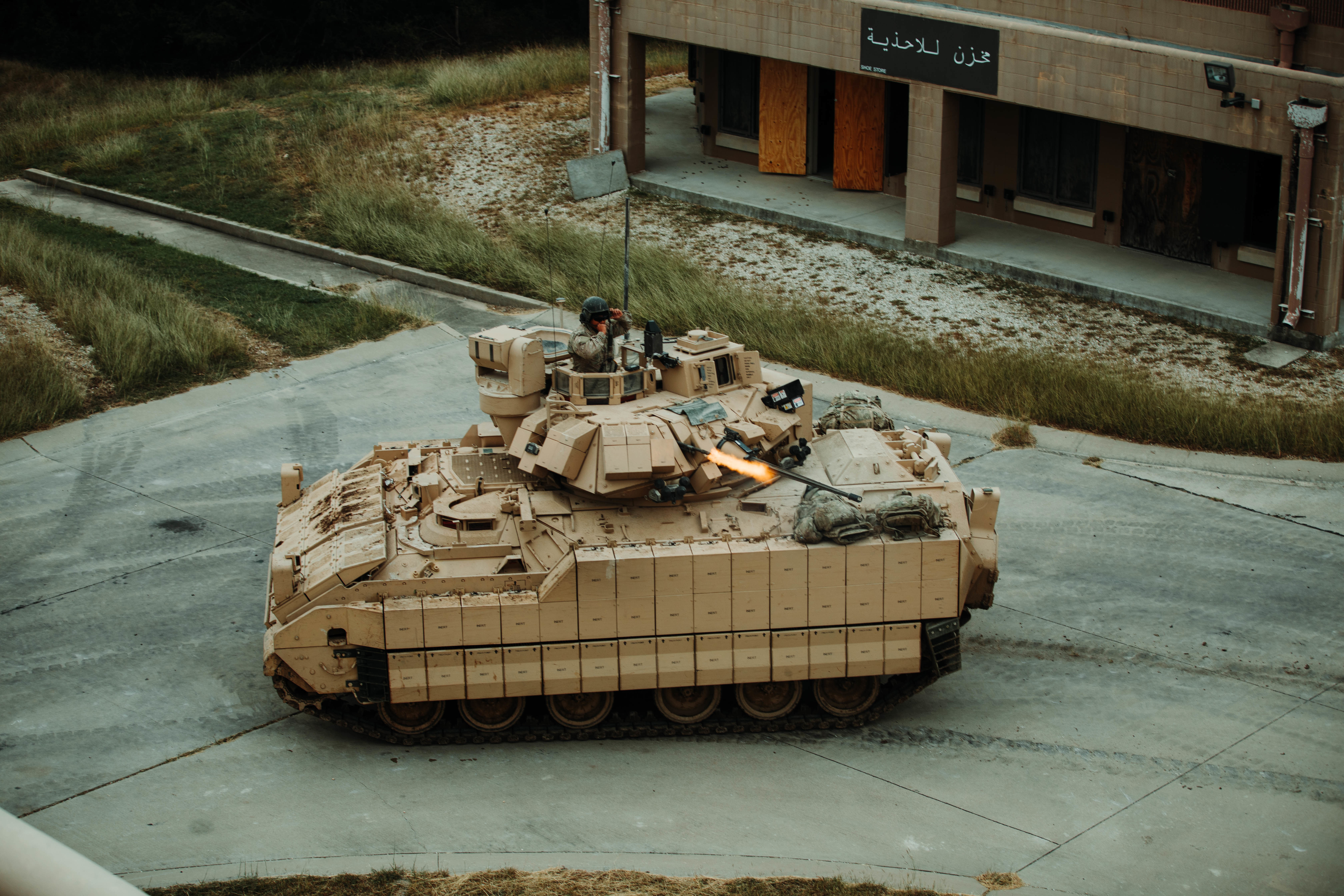
Troopers assigned to 1st Cavalry Division, engage an opposing force during the testing of the newest version of the Bradley, Fort Cavazos, Oct. 24, 2020

After the Iraq War, the Army began to research engineering change proposals (ECPs) for the M2 Bradley to restore space, weight, power, and cooling capacity reduced by the addition of armor and electronics hastily added during combat. ECP1 will work to restore mobility and allow the vehicle to handle more weight. As its weight increases, the Bradley sits lower on its suspension, which reduces its ground clearance. This decreases mobility on rough terrain and leaves the vehicle more vulnerable to IEDs. The effort will install lighter tracks, shock absorbers, a new suspension support system, and heavy weight torsion bars. The Army will upgrade its entire active fleet of Bradleys with ECP 1, this comes out to 3,344 vehicles with the final upgrades being procured in FY22.

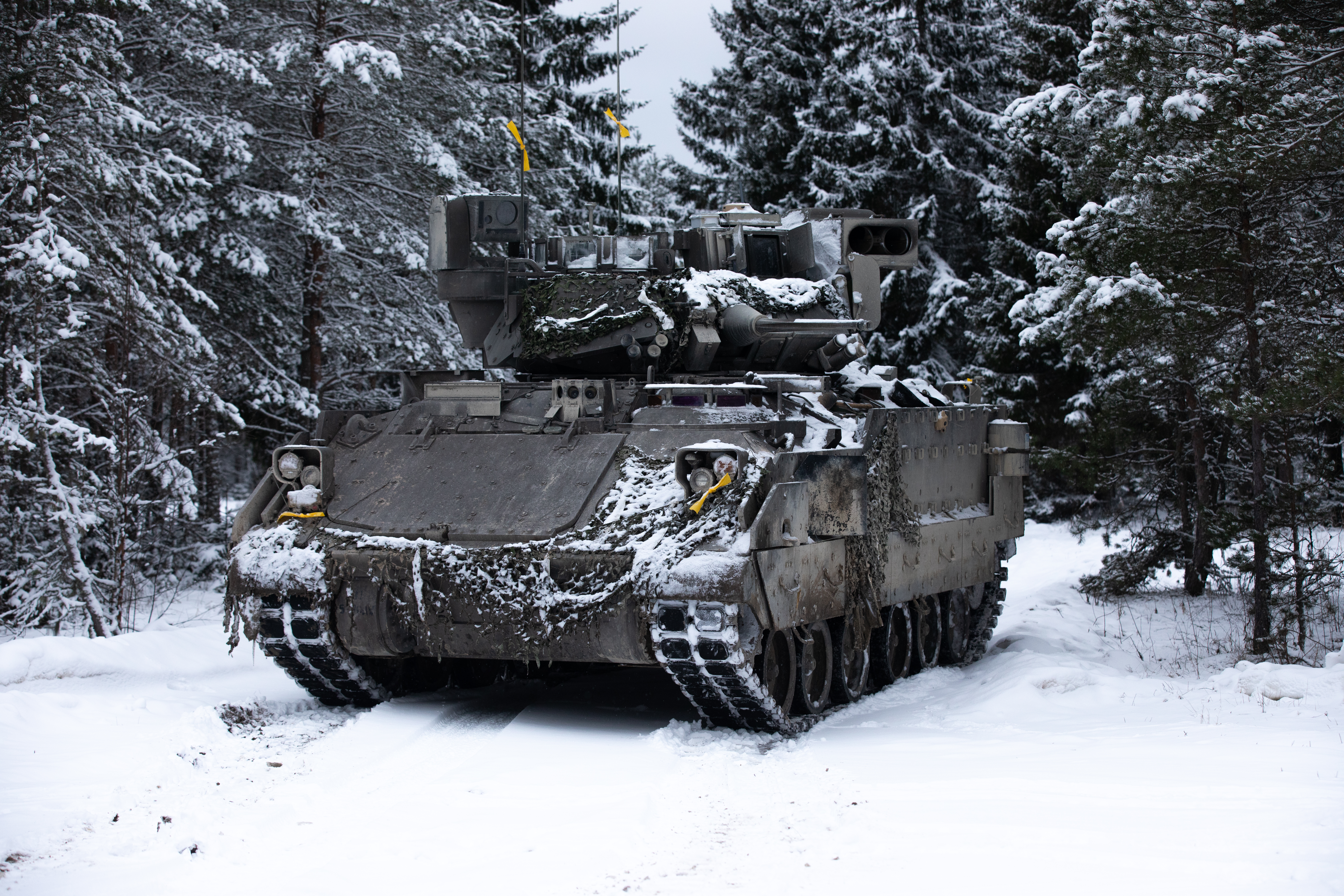
M2A4 Bradley

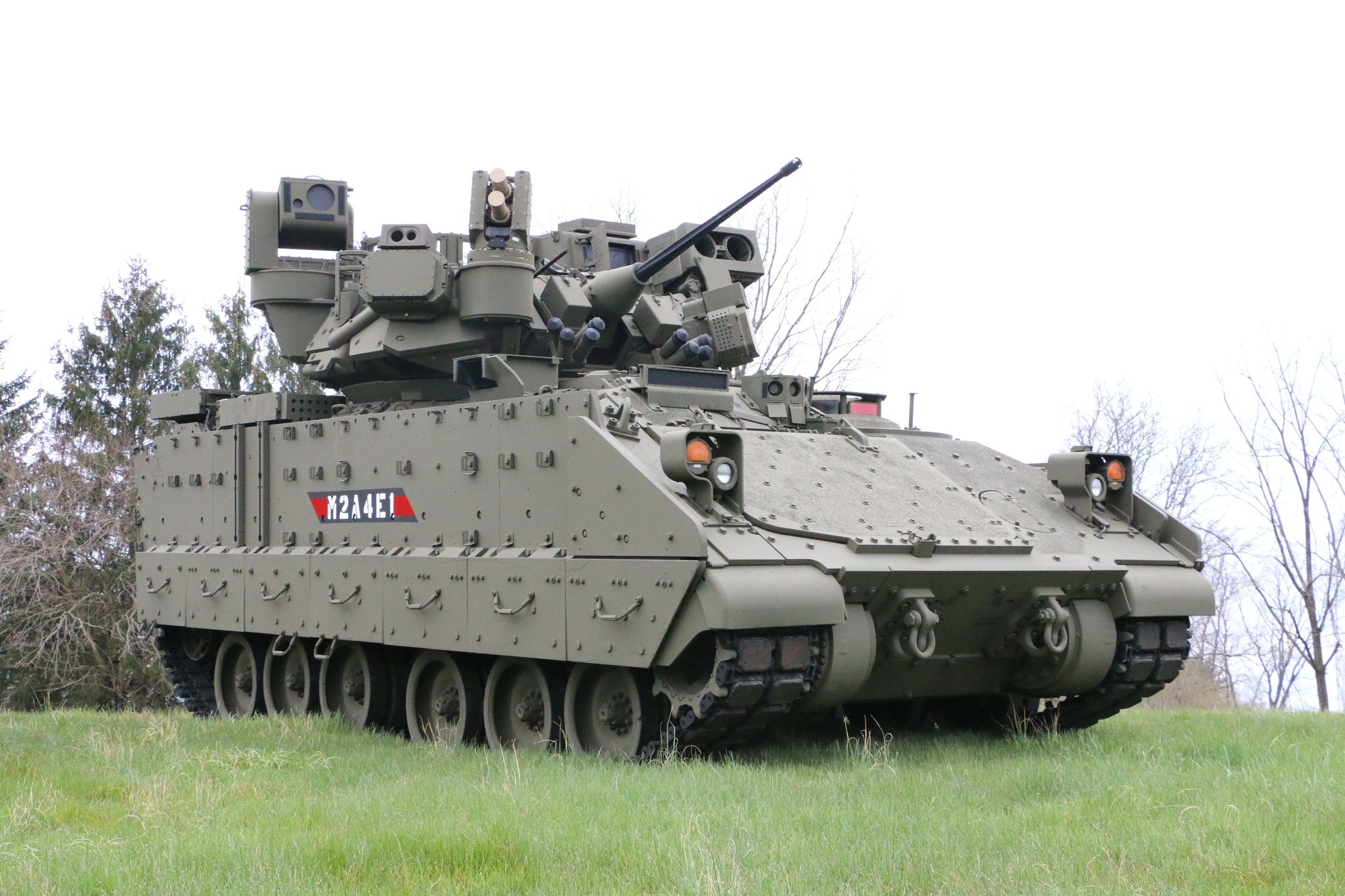
M2A4E1 with Iron Fist

ECP2 will restore automotive power with a larger engine, a new transmission, and a smart-power management system for better electrical power distribution to accept future networked tactical radio and battle command systems. The first Bradleys upgraded with ECP1 were fielded in mid-2015, and the first to be upgraded with ECP2 will begin fielding in 2018. Vehicles that receive both the ECP1 and ECP2 upgrade will be designated A4.

In June 2018, BAE Systems Land and Armaments was awarded a contract to produce up to 164 M2A4 and M7A4 Bradley Fighting Vehicles using existing M2A3, M7A3 and M2A2 ODS-SA (situational awareness) Bradleys. The M2A4 is equipped with an enhanced drivetrain, a more powerful engine, new digitized electronics, a new fire suppression system, and a new IED jammer.

The first M2A4 models were fielded in April 2022. The US Army Procurment Objective for M2A4 and M7A4 vehicles as of June 2025 was for 1,329 vehicles. This is enough for 9 Armored Brigades as well as Training vehicles and maintenance vehicles. Orders are expected to be placed through FY28 and deliveries are expected to conclude in FY30. By June 2025 the US Army had ordered 985 M2A4 and M7A4 vehicles and received 583.

In April 2024, the U.S. Army unveiled the M2A4E1 Bradley with the Iron Fist active protection system integrated.

=== Mission Enabler Technologies-Demonstrator ===
The MET-D is an experimental variant of the M2 Bradley that prototypes the use of surrogate robotic combat vehicles (RCVs), which are operated by the crew of the MET-D. It is equipped with a remote turret for the main 25 mm chain gun, 360-degree situational awareness cameras and enhanced crew stations with touchscreens.

=== Other uses of the Bradley chassis ===
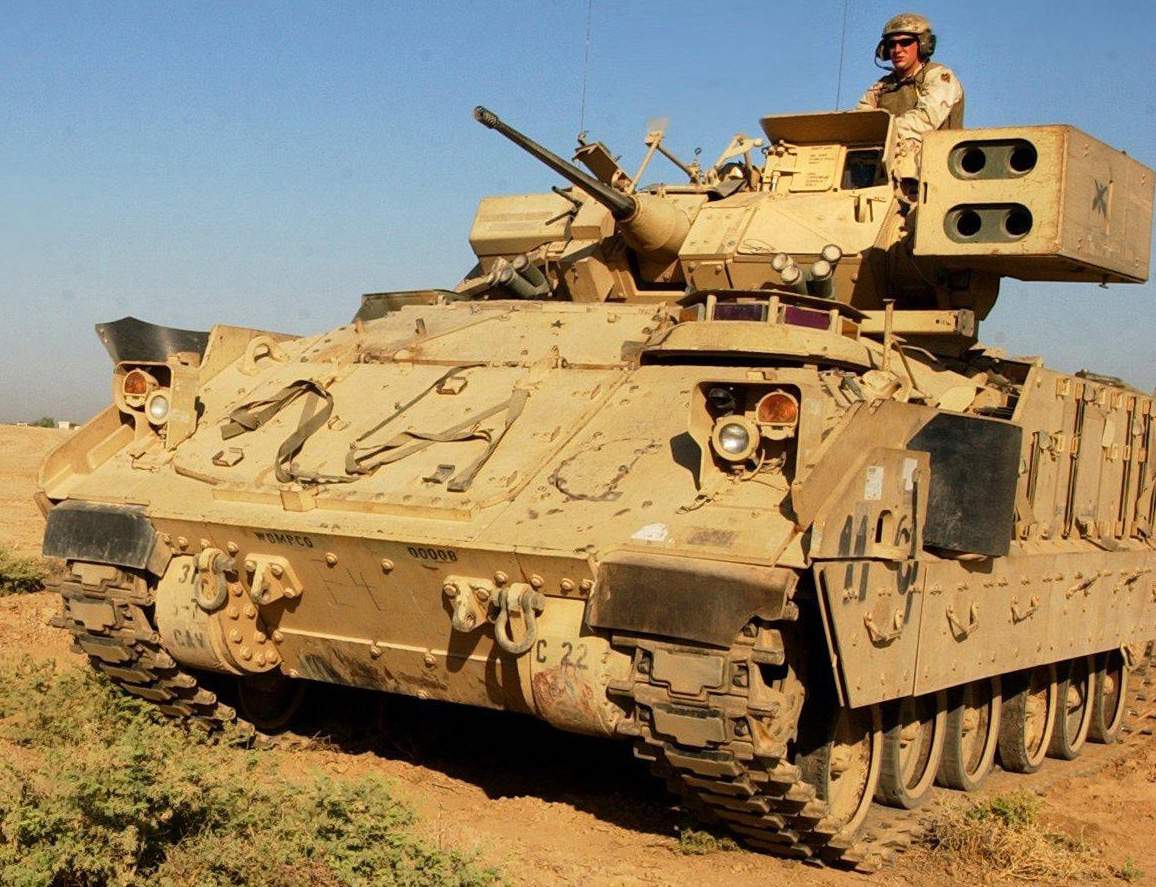
M6 Linebacker

The Bradley series has been widely modified. Its chassis is the basis for the M270 Multiple Launch Rocket System, the M4 C2V battlefield command post, and the M6 Bradley Linebacker air defense vehicle. Armed with a quad Stinger surface-to-air missile launcher in place of the TOW anti-tank missiles, but maintaining the 25 mm autocannon, the M6 Bradley Linebacker Air Defense Vehicle (no longer in service) possessed a unique role in the U.S. Army, providing highly mobile air defense at the front line.

The Bradley's suspension system has been used on upgraded versions of the U.S. Marines' Assault Amphibious Vehicle.

=== Table of variants ===
	M2 and M2A1	M2A2 and M2A2 RESTOW	M2A2 ODS	M2A3	M2A4
References					
Overall length	254 in (6.5 m)	258 in (6.6 m)			
Overall width	126 in (3.2 m)	129 in (3.3 m) (w/o armor kit)			131 in (3.3 m)
Height over commander's hatch	117 in (3.0 m)		119 in (3.0 m)	130 in (3.3 m)	
Ground clearance	18 in (45.7 cm)			15 in (38.1 cm)	16 in (40.6 cm)
Top speed	41 mph (66 km/h)	35 mph (56 km/h)	38 mph (61 km/h)		41 mph (66 km/h)
Fording	Floats				
Maximum grade	60%				
Maximum trench traversal depth	8.3 ft (2.5 m)				
Maximum wall traversal height	36 in (0.9 m)	30 in (0.8 m)	36 in (0.9 m)		
Range	300 mi (480 km)	250 mi (400 km)			
Power	500 hp (373 kW) at 2600 rpm	600 hp (447 kW) at 2600 rpm			675 hp (503 kW) at 2800 rpm
Power-to-weight ratio	19.9 hp/ST (16.4 kW/t)	20 hp/ST (16.4 kW/t) (w/o armor kit)	18.07 hp/ST (14.85 kW/t)	18.18 hp/ST (14.94 kW/t)	17.05 hp/ST (14.0 kW/t)
Torque	1,025 lb⋅ft (1,390 N⋅m) at 2350 rpm	1,225 lb⋅ft (1,660 N⋅m) at 2300 rpm			
Weight, combat loaded	50,200 lb (22,770 kg)	60,000 lb (27,220 kg)	66,401 lb (30,120 kg)	66,000 lb (29,940 kg)	79,182 lb (35,920 kg)
Ground pressure	7.8 psi (54 kPa)	9.3 psi (64 kPa)(w/o armor kit)	9.9 psi (68 kPa)	9.9 psi (68 kPa)	
Main armament	25 mm M242 Bushmaster chain gun BGM-71 TOW anti-tank missile				
Elevation, main gun	+59° −9°, M2 +57° −9°, M2A1	+57° −9°			
Traverse rate	6 seconds/360°				
Elevation rate	60°/second				
Main gun ammo	900 rounds, 5 TOW or Dragon missiles + 2 in launcher	900 rounds, 5 TOW 2 or Dragon missiles + 2 in launcher	900 rounds, 5 missiles (incl. TOW 2 & up to 2 Javelin) + 2 in launcher		
Firing rate	single shot, 100, 200 rounds per minute				

== Operators ==
Current Bradley operators

- Croatia: 89 M2A2 ODS
- Lebanon: 32 M2A2
- Russia: 12 M2A2 ODS Bradleys captured from Ukraine
- Saudi Arabia: 400
- Ukraine - 300+ M2A2 ODS-SA (situational awareness) Bradleys were delivered from April 2023 onwards, of this 185 Bradleys were reported as lost, including those damaged, abandoned, or captured.
- United States: 4,285 total, estimated 2,000 M2A2 ODS-SA (situational awareness)/A3 & 285 M2A4 Bradleys in operation with the US Army (2000 more M2 Bradleys in storage) as of January 2025.

=== Potential operators ===
- Greece (as of 2023)
- Portugal: The current military programming law contains a budget for replacing the M113 with a new infantry fighting vehicle. This project is known as VCI-L (Veículo de Combate de Infantaria de Lagartas). It was mentioned on CNN Portugal that the M2 Bradley would be the most likely vehicle of this type to equip the Army.

== See also ==
- K21 – (South Korea)
- Armored Multi-Purpose Vehicle – Bradley-based APC
- BMP development – contemporary Soviet project
- BTR-4- Ukrainian army wheeled IFV
- Ground Combat Vehicle – U.S. Army IFV canceled in 2014
- M1126 infantry carrier vehicle – US Army Stryker infantry carrier vehicle
- M242 Bushmaster
- Mechanized infantry
- MICV-65 – US Army project leading to development of the M2 Bradley
- Warrior tracked armoured vehicle – contemporary British IFV
- The Pentagon Wars – film based on Burton's account of the Bradley's development.

== Sources ==
- Hunnicutt, R. P. (1999). Bradley: A History of American Fighting and Support Vehicles. Presidio Press. ISBN 978-0-89141-694-4.
