= The Pentagon Wars =

1998 comedy film directed by Richard Benjamin

- HBO release poster
- Genre: Comedy; War
- Based on: The Pentagon Wars by Col. James G. Burton
- Screenplay by: Jamie Malanowski; Martyn Burke
- Directed by: Richard Benjamin
- Starring: Kelsey Grammer; Cary Elwes; Olympia Dukakis; Richard Benjamin
- Music by: Joseph Vitarelli
- Country of origin: United States
- Original language: English

Production
- Executive producers: Martyn Burke; Danny DeVito; Michael Shamberg; Stacey Sher
- Producer: Howard Meltzer
- Production locations: Washington, D.C.
- Cinematography: Robert Yeoman
- Editor: Jacqueline Cambas
- Running time: 103 min
- Production company: HBO NYC Production

Original release
- Network: HBO
- Release: February 28, 1998

The Pentagon Wars is a 1998 HBO comedy film directed by Richard Benjamin based on The Pentagon Wars: Reformers Challenge the Old Guard, a book written by retired United States Air Force Colonel James G. Burton about the development of the Bradley Fighting Vehicle.

== Plot ==
The Bradley Fighting Vehicle project, stalled in development for seventeen years at the running cost of $14 billion, is the charge of Major General Partridge. To curtail further excessive Pentagon spending, Congress appoints U.S. Air Force Lieutenant Colonel James Burton to observe the Bradley's field development and tests.

Burton delves into the complicated development history, beginning in the 1960s under Colonel Robert L. Smith, who becomes frustrated with the continuous design changes mandated by higher ups, leading to the Bradley's transformation from a light troop carrier into a bulky tank-like vehicle poorly suited to its original role. Burton also discovers discrepancies in testing of the Bradley's survivability due to Partridge's cronies, Colonel Bock and Major Sayers. Burton receives confidential information from now-General Smith on the condition of anonymity. Master Sergeant Dalton, the man in charge of live fire testing, reveals he's been routinely ordered to manipulate the test results, asserting that honest officers such as Burton always end up buckling to the pressure of corruption to gain their next promotions.

Burton's continuous insistence on fair testing prompts Partridge to reassign Burton to Alaska but another anonymous leak from General Smith convinces Defense Secretary Weinberger to demand a full written report on the Bradley. Partridge cancels Burton's transfer and orders him to write the report which he plans to alter when it is sent to him for approval. Burton circumvents this by highlighting the changes made on Partridge's orders in a memorandum, which is leaked to the press and instigates a hearing before the House Armed Services Committee.

Partridge is humiliated at the hearing and the Committee Chairwoman orders the tests Burton has demanded go ahead. Burton reminds the soldiers performing the survivability tests that despite Partridge's orders to manipulate the tests, their real responsibility is to their fellow soldiers whose lives depend on honest testing. Partridge is humiliated when the live fire testing results in the complete destruction of the vehicle. Dalton and his men admit they were swayed by Burton's sincerity and integrity.

A postscript explains the Bradley was extensively redesigned in response to Burton's demands, significantly reducing casualties during its use in the Gulf War. Most of the officers involved in the Bradley's development earned promotions and high paying jobs while Burton was forced to retire.

== Cast ==
- Kelsey Grammer as Major General Partridge
- Cary Elwes as Lieutenant Colonel James G. Burton
- Viola Davis as Sergeant Fanning
- John C. McGinley as Colonel J.D. Bock
- Tom Wright as Major William Sayers
- Clifton Powell as Sergeant Benjamin Dalton
- Dewey Weber as Spec-4 Granger
- Richard Schiff as Colonel Smith
- J.C. MacKenzie as Jones
- Richard Benjamin as Caspar Weinberger
- Olympia Dukakis as Madam Chairwoman
- Sam Anderson as Congressman
- Randy Oglesby as Test Range General
- Dann Florek as Major General Bob Braden
- Beau Billingslea as General Rainero
- Richard Riehle as General Vice
- Chris Ellis as General Keane
- Drew Snyder as Admiral Morehouse
- Bruce French as General De Grasso
- Tim DeKay as Junior Officer Embassy Party

== Production ==
Col. James Burton is credited as a consultant on the film. Russell Murray II is also credited as a consultant on the film. Murray served as Principal Deputy Assistant Secretary of Defense for Systems Analysis from 1962 to 1969 and Assistant Secretary of Defense for Program Analysis and Evaluation from 1977 to 1981, both during the development of the Bradley Fighting Vehicle.

Writer Martyn Burke also wrote the 1999 film version of Animal Farm, also starring Kelsey Grammer.

HBO rated the film TV-MA-L upon release. The MPAA rated the film "R for Language".

=== Filming ===
The Pentagon Wars was filmed at Camp Roberts, California.

== Reception ==
Upon its premiere on HBO, Daryl Miller reviewed the film for the Los Angeles Times and described it as "a savvy satire of military spending—an epic tale of boys and their toys ... a triumph for that cable outlet."

== Awards ==
- Primetime Emmy Awards 1998: Amy Stofsky (costume supervisor): Winner of Outstanding Costuming for a Miniseries, Movie or a Special
- Columbus International Film & Video Festival 1998: Winner of Chris Award for Social Issues
- Satellite Awards Cary Elwes: Nominee Golden Satellite Award for Best Actor in a Miniseries or a Motion Picture Made for Television

== See also ==
- Col James Burton and the Joint Live Fire Testing Program – Section of article on Bradley Fighting Vehicle
