= Moscow Defense Brief =

Defense magazine in Russia

- Discipline: Defense industry
- Language: English

Publication details
- History: 2004–2018
- Publisher: Centre for Analysis of Strategies and Technologies (Russian Federation)
- Frequency: Irregular

Standard abbreviations
- ISO 4: Mosc. Def. Br.

Links
- Moscow Defense Brief (archived March 2022)

Moscow Defense Brief was an English-language defense magazine published by Centre for Analysis of Strategies and Technologies (CAST), an independent defense think-tank in Moscow, Russia. The magazine was in circulation between 2004 and 2018 and published a special edition in 2019.

== Overview ==
The purpose of Moscow Defense Brief was to provide analysis of developments and trends in Russia's defense policy and industry, tailored to the demands of defense and security professionals in the English-speaking world. The articles in Moscow Defense Brief were written by both full-time analysts at CAST and a number of independent experts. External experts who wrote for Moscow Defense Briefincluded: Fyodor Lukyanov, editor-in-chief of Russia in Global Affairs; Aleksey Nikolsky, Defense and politics reporter for Vedomosti; Alexandr Stukalin deputy editor-in-chief of Kommersant; Andrei Kortunov, director general of the Russian International Affairs Council; and Roger McDermott, senior fellow at the Jamestown Foundation.

The magazine was launched in 2004, and its reports were regularly cited by news sources such as The Moscow Times, The Wall Street Journal, Reuters, and the BBC News. The magazine's last regular issue was published in December 2018, since then MDB is published on ad-hoc basis.

The magazine had its headquarters in Moscow. As of 2015 the editor-in-chief of Moscow Defense Brief was Mikhail Barabanov and the project director was Andrey Frolov.

Moscow Defense Brief folded in 2018 and issued a special volume in 2019. Subscribers received not only a print edition of each new issue, but they were also given online access to every previously published Moscow Defense Brief through the Centre for Analysis of Strategies and Technologies website since 2004.

== Format ==
Moscow Defense Brief issues were typically separated into sections on international relations, Russian defense industry topics, the arms trade, the Russian Armed Forces, interviews with prominent defense industry or government officials, and quantitative data. Moscow Defense Brief published the yearly figures for Russia's arms sales, which were the most comprehensive source of Russian foreign military-technical cooperation data.

== See also ==
- Centre for Analysis of Strategies and Technologies
