= Ruslan Pukhov =

Russian defense analyst

- Born: Ruslan Nikolayevich Pukhov; 16 April 1973 (age 53); Elektrostal, Moscow Oblast, Russian SFSR, Soviet Union
- Education: Moscow State Institute of International Relations
- Occupation: CAST director

Ruslan Nikolayevich Pukhov (Russian: Руслан Николаевич Пухов) is a Russian defence analyst and director of the Moscow-based Centre for Analysis of Strategies and Technologies (CAST). In addition to his role at CAST, since 2007 Pukhov has been a member of the Public Council of the Russian Ministry of Defence, composed of civilians and retired servicemen, which advises the Minister of Defence on a variety of issues. He was previously the executive director of the Russian Armourers' Union, which represents Russian small arms manufacturers.

== Early years ==
Pukhov was born on 16 April 1973 in Elektrostal, a suburb of Moscow.

Pukhov studied international journalism at the Moscow State Institute of International Relations (MGIMO) from 1990 to 1994. In 1996, he graduated from the Franco-Russian dual-degree program between Master d'Etudes Internationales Sciences Po and MGIMO with an M.A. in political science. While studying at Sciences Po, Pukhov interned at the Russian Embassy in Paris for six months.

Upon his return to Russia, Pukhov then worked as a researcher of the Conventional Arms Project at the Center for Policy Studies in Russia (PIR Center) from 1996 to 1997.

== Career ==
In the summer of 1997, Pukhov and Konstantin Makienko founded the Centre for Analysis of Strategies and Technologies (CAST), which was inspired by the French think tank Centre de recherches et d'études sur les stratégies et les technologies or Centre for Study of Strategies and Technologies (CREST). CAST publishes the Russian-language journal Eksport Vooruzheniy (Arms Exports), which cover topics on Russian and former Soviet states' defence industries, arms trade, and armed forces.

Pukhov has written a number of articles and op-eds on defence matters for The New York Times, Defense News, The National Interest, and other news sources. He has also published a number of books, including Brothers Armed: Military Aspects of the Crisis in Ukraine, The Tanks of August, The Turkish Military Machine, etc. Pukhov is also frequently interviewed on defence topics by Russian and foreign media sources, including Vedomosti, Kommersant, The Wall Street Journal, and Reuters.

Since 2018, Pukhov has been moderating the Ogarkov Readings conference dedicated to the memory of Marshal of the Soviet Union Nikolai Ogarkov, who anticipated the revolution in military affairs.

=== Russian invasion of Ukraine ===
On 19 October 2022, Pukhov accidentally let slip during a live interview on RBK TV that Russia's loitering munitions used in the Russo-Ukrainian War—specifically Geran-2—are of Iranian origin, saying "we all know that they're Iranian, but the authorities aren't acknowledging it".

On 29 March 2024 Pukhov said that in order to take Ukraine, the Kremlin would need more soldiers.

On 9 June 2024 Bloomberg quoted Pukhov as saying the Russian strategy was “very expensive and bloody for the Russian army itself.. It can lead to excessive exhaustion of forces on the Russian side.”
