= Centre for Analysis of Strategies and Technologies =

Russian think tank

- Центр анализа стратегий и технологий
- Abbreviation: CAST
- Formation: 1997; 29 years ago
- Type: defense industry and arms trade think tank
- Headquarters: Moscow, Russia
- Director: Ruslan Pukhov
- Website: www.cast.ru

The Centre for Analysis of Strategies and Technologies (CAST); Russian: Центр анализа стратегий и технологий) is an independent, for-profit Russian think tank located in downtown Moscow.

CAST conducts research and analysis on Russian conventional arms trade, Russia's defense industry, military conflicts, Russian military reform, and international defense trends. It is primarily focused on Russia and the former Soviet Republics. CAST has also written reports and books on the defense industries of China, India, Turkey, and many European nations.

CAST publishes two journals — the English-language Moscow Defense Brief and the Russian-language Eksport Vooruzheniy ("arms exports") — and the daily Russian media digest Periscope. In addition, CAST has written a number of books, including the critically acclaimed The Tanks of August (2010), Russia's New Army (2011), and Brothers Armed: Military Aspects of the Crisis in Ukraine (2014). CAST also runs the popular Russian language blogs Periscope 2 and BMPD, which provide daily articles on Russian and international defense news.

CAST offers consultation, analysis, and information services to Russian government agencies, defense industry companies, banks, and investment institutions. Although it has conducted research projects for the Russian government, CAST is a privately owned and operated company, and all of its revenue is derived from research and media products, consultation services, and other projects.

== Overview ==
CAST was founded in the summer of 1997 by Ruslan Pukhov and Konstantin Makienko. Pukhov and Makienko both attended the Franco-Russian dual-degree program between Master d'Etudes Internationales Sciences Po and MGIMO in Paris where Makienko interned at the French defense industry, Centre for Study of Strategies and Technologies (CREST), which is now the Foundation for Strategic Research.

After returning to Russia and initially working as researchers at the Center for Policy Studies in Russia (PIR Center), Pukhov and Makienko decided to establish CAST with CREST as their inspiration.

CAST employs approximately ten full-time researchers with many additional analysts working part-time. The centre's researchers collaborate on an ad hoc basis with leading Russian experts, journalists, defense specialists and civil servants working on similar issues. Pukhov serves as the director, Makienko as the deputy director, and Maksim Shepovalenko, a retired career Russian naval officer, also as deputy director. In addition to his work at CAST, Pukhov is member of the Public Council of the Russian Ministry of Defense and the former executive director of the Russian Armorers Union. Since 2008, Makienko has served as a member of the expert council under the Russian Duma defense committee.

=== Major publications ===
Since 1997, CAST has been publishing the Russian-language journal Eksport Vooruzheniy (Arms Export) on arms trade and defense industries issues. CAST typically publishes 6 editions of Eksport Vooruzheniy each year, and it contains a list of all the open-source Russian arms sales and military procurement decisions for each year.

Up until 2018, CAST also published the English language Moscow Defense Brief (MDB), which was aimed to provide an analysis of trends in Russian defense policy and industry for English speakers. CAST maintains an electronic archive of all previously published Moscow Defense Brief on its website.

CAST also publishes the daily digest Periscope, which compiles all of the news on Russia's military, defense industry, arms sales, and defense policy from Russian and foreign media sources.

CAST has published a variety of books on defense topics in Russian and English. These books provide a Russian perspective on defense issues and developments. In 2008, CAST released the Russian language book Military-Technical Cooperation between Russia and Foreign Countries: A Market Analysis, which gave a detailed analysis of the global arms market and Russia's position within it. CAST published an account of the five-day war between Russia and Georgia in South Ossetia in The Tanks of August.

Their next book Russia's New Army, which was published in both Russian and English, detailed the reforms undertaken by Russia Defense Minister Anatoliy Serdyukov. CAST's next two books, both in Russian, Alien War and World of Khaki: Armed Forces in the System of State Power, analyzed armed conflicts since 1991 and the role of the military in the political affairs of a number of countries, including Pakistan, Turkey, and Algeria, respectively. The last two Russian language books from CAST were The Defense Industry and Arms Trade of China and Radio-electronic Warfare: From Experiments of the past to the Future Decisive Front. They also published two editions of the English language Brothers Armed: Military Aspects of the Crisis in Ukraine, which analyzed Russia's annexation of Crimea and the war in Donbas.

In October, 2016, CAST released the second edition of the Russian-language book The Syrian Frontier edited by Maxim Shepovalenko. The book examines the history of Russia's relationship with Syria, and it details the conduct of Russia's military intervention in Syria beginning in September 2015. The second edition features a foreword by the Minister of Defense of the Russian Federation, Sergey Shoygu, and an afterword by the Russian Minister of Foreign Affairs, Sergey Lavrov.

On December 21, 2016, CAST published the Russian-language book The Defense Industry and Military-Technical Cooperation with Foreign States of India.

In 2017 the Centre published Turkish Military Machine: Strengths and Weaknesses. The book examines the Turkish defense industry, the defense budget, the Turkish officer class as a social institution, and its recent military history.

CAST has also recently published two books, one in Russian and the other in English, on international Special Operations Forces. The first, Between War and Peace: Special Operations Forces is in Russian, and it provides a description of the Special Operations Forces of the United States, the United Kingdom, France, Germany, Italy, Poland, Turkey, Israel, Iran, China, and Colombia. It features a foreword from the Director of "Helicopters of Russia", and it is edited by Mikhail Barabanov. The second book is called Elite Warriors: Special Operations Forces From Around the World. Edited by Ruslan Pukhov, director of CAST, and Dr. Christopher Marsh, professor of National Security and Strategic Studies at the US Army Command and General Staff College, Fort Leavenworth, Kansas, Elite Warriors is in English and it covers the special operations forces of Algeria, China, Colombia, France, Germany, Iran, Israel, Italy, Jordan, Poland, Russia, Singapore, Turkey, and Ukraine.

In 2018 the books Thunder Sky: Aviation in Modern Conflicts (edited by former Commander of the Russian Aerospace Forces Viktor Bondarev) and Waiting for the Storm: South Caucasus were published.

CAST's latest book is Global Arms Market: Structure, Tendencies, Challenges, it was published with support of Rosoboronexport.

=== Ogarkov Readings ===
In October 2018 CAST organized the Ogarkov Readings. The conference is dedicated to the memory of Marshal of the Soviet Union Nikolay Ogarkov – a Russian military thinker of the second half of the 20th century who anticipated the Revolution in Military Affairs.

The Conference is held on a yearly basis. Participants discuss the development of military technologies and their impact on modern conflicts. The event is attended by prominent representatives of the armed forces and defense industry.

=== History ===
The organization was founded in June 1997 by graduates of Moscow State Institute of International Relations and it has close contacts with the Russian arms industry, the Rosoboronexport consortium, and senior government officials.

CAST is not financed by the government. It gets all of its income from selling research and media products, consultation services, and other projects. Its office is located in Moscow.

== See also ==
- Moscow Defense Brief
