= James G. Burton =

United States Air Force officer

- Burton pictured in the 1959 United States Air Force Academy yearbook
- Born: James Gordon Burton; April 3, 1937 (age 89); Normal, Illinois, U.S.
- Education: United States Air Force Academy (BS)
- Spouse: Nancy Burton
- Children: 2
- Military career
- Branch: United States Air Force
- Service years: 1955–1986
- Rank: Colonel
- Nickname: "The Bird"

James Gordon Burton (born May 3, 1937) is a former United States Air Force officer and whistleblower who wrote The Pentagon Wars: Reformers Challenge the Old Guard, a book about the development of the Bradley Fighting Vehicle that was adapted into the 1998 HBO comedy film, The Pentagon Wars.

== Early life and career ==
Born at the end of the Great Depression in rural Normal, Illinois Burton was a member of the inaugural class of the United States Air Force Academy, graduating in 1959. He was described as one of the outstanding leaders of the class, and was twice selected for Group Commander duty in his final year. He was an above-average student academically and a power-hitting outfielder on the baseball field, and was one of four outstanding members of the class selected to meet President Dwight D. Eisenhower at the White House.

He was removed from flying status after a fainting episode revealed internal bleeding. Unable to diagnose the cause (partly due to a malformed stomach he was born with), doctors treated him for a bleeding stomach ulcer. This stopped the bleeding, but, due to the time that diagnosis and treatment took, saw him permanently grounded and led to a second career in weapons procurement at The Pentagon. He moved to the Development Plans Office at the Pentagon and moved rapidly up the ranks.

The New York Times wrote on a write-up about his later book The Pentagon Wars: Reformers Challenge the Old Guard that, in his Pentagon roles, "Burton was part of a small cadre of military officers and civilians in Government who challenged the system from inside the Pentagon" and who started to internally challenge how weapons systems were procured. "In the early 1980's, they began telling anyone who would listen about weapons systems that would cost billions of dollars more than advertised, or perform far less effectively than was claimed, or both. The top military and civilian leaders in the Pentagon did not appreciate this message. They did their best to shoot the messengers."

=== Bradley Fighting Vehicle ===
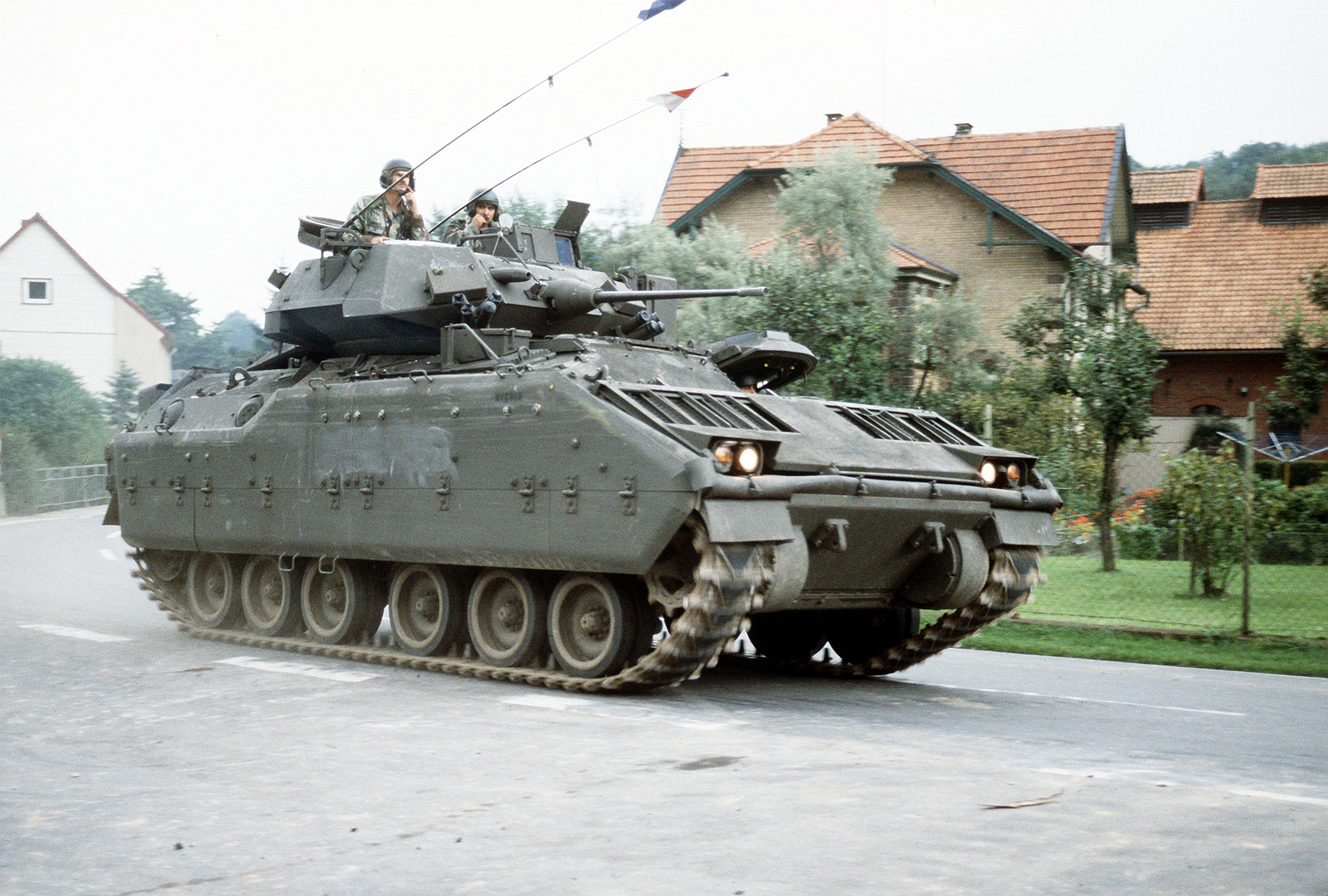
U.S. Army M2 Bradley in 1985, West Germany.

Working for the Director, Operational Test and Evaluation at the Office of the Secretary of Defense, Burton advocated for the use of live-fire tests on fully loaded military vehicles to check for survivability, something that the Army and Air Force agreed to, establishing the joint live fire testing program in 1984.

According to Burton, the Army had been fudging tests on the Bradley Fighting Vehicle to ensure it passed muster, including filling the fuel tanks with water to avoid explosions and ceasing measurement when toxic gases were measured in the interior. An investigation by the House Armed Services Committee found that Burton's claims were due not to malfeasance but rather the result of “a long-standing fundamental disagreement over testing methodology and, more importantly, the inability of OSD and the Army to reach an agreement on how the test is conducted."

== Later life ==
Burton retired from the Air Force instead of accepting a transfer in 1986. In 1993, he wrote the book The Pentagon Wars: Reformers Challenge the Old Guard.

== In popular culture ==
Burton is played by Cary Elwes in the 1998 HBO comedy adaptation of his book.

== General and cited sources ==
- Burton, James G. (1993). The Pentagon Wars: Reformers Challenge the Old Guard. Annapolis, MD: Naval Institute Press. ISBN 1-55750-081-9.
