= CIP =

CIP may refer to:

== Business and finance ==
- Commercially Important Person
- Construction in progress, a balance sheet assets item
- Continual improvement process
- "Carriage and Insurance Paid to" Incoterms
- Customer Identification Program, in US anti-money laundering

== Government and military ==
- Capital improvement plan, in urban planning
- Citizen Information Project in the UK
- Classification of Instructional Programs, US Department of Education
- Commercial Import Program, US-South Vietnam
- Competitiveness and Innovation Framework Programme of the EU
- Combat Identification Panel, a US identify-friend-or-foe device
- Continuation in Part in US Patent law
- Corps of Intelligence Police of US Army 1917-1941
- Critical Infrastructure Protection, US
- Customer Identification Program, in US anti-money laundering

== Organizations and businesses ==
- Canadian Institute of Planners
- California Innocence Project, for innocent prisoners
- Center for Industrial Progress think tank, San Diego, California, US
- Center for Islamic Pluralism, Washington D.C., US
- Centro Internacional de la Papa, the International Potato Center in Peru
- Center for Intellectual Property Studies, Gothenburg, Sweden
- Centre for Integrated Photonics
- Center for International Policy, Washington D.C, US
- Commission Internationale Permanente pour l'Epreuve des Armes à Feu Portatives (Permanent International Commission for the Proof of Small Arms)
- Comitato Italiano Paralimpico, Italian Paralympic Committee
- Cook Islands Party
- Crown International Pictures, US film studio
- Crippled Intellect Publications, a record label

== Science and technology ==
=== Biology and medicine ===
- Calf-intestinal alkaline phosphatase, an enzyme
- Congenital insensitivity to pain
- Critical illness polyneuropathy
- CIP/KIP family of Cyclin-dependent kinase inhibitor proteins
- Cannabis Induced Psychosis

=== Chemistry ===
- Cahn–Ingold–Prelog priority rules, or CIP system, for naming organic molecules
- Carbon in pulp, method of gold extraction
- Clean-in-place, without disassembly

=== Computing ===
- CIP-Tool, for modelling event-driven processes
- Common Indexing Protocol, for exchanging index information
- Common Industrial Protocol, automation protocol
- Core Independent Peripherals, an implementation of autonomous peripheral operations in microcontrollers

=== Military ===
- Class Improvement Project, a minor type of ship upgrade created by the US Navy Ship Characteristics Board 1945-1975

=== Other uses in science and technology ===
- Cataloging in Publication, data for a work, in library science
- Certified IRB Professional, a scientific research certification
- Cold isostatic pressing
