= EFSM (disambiguation) =

EFSM may refer to:

- Eligibility for free school meals
- European Financial Stabilisation Mechanism
- Extended finite-state machine
