= Friendly fire =

Accidental attack on friendly forces

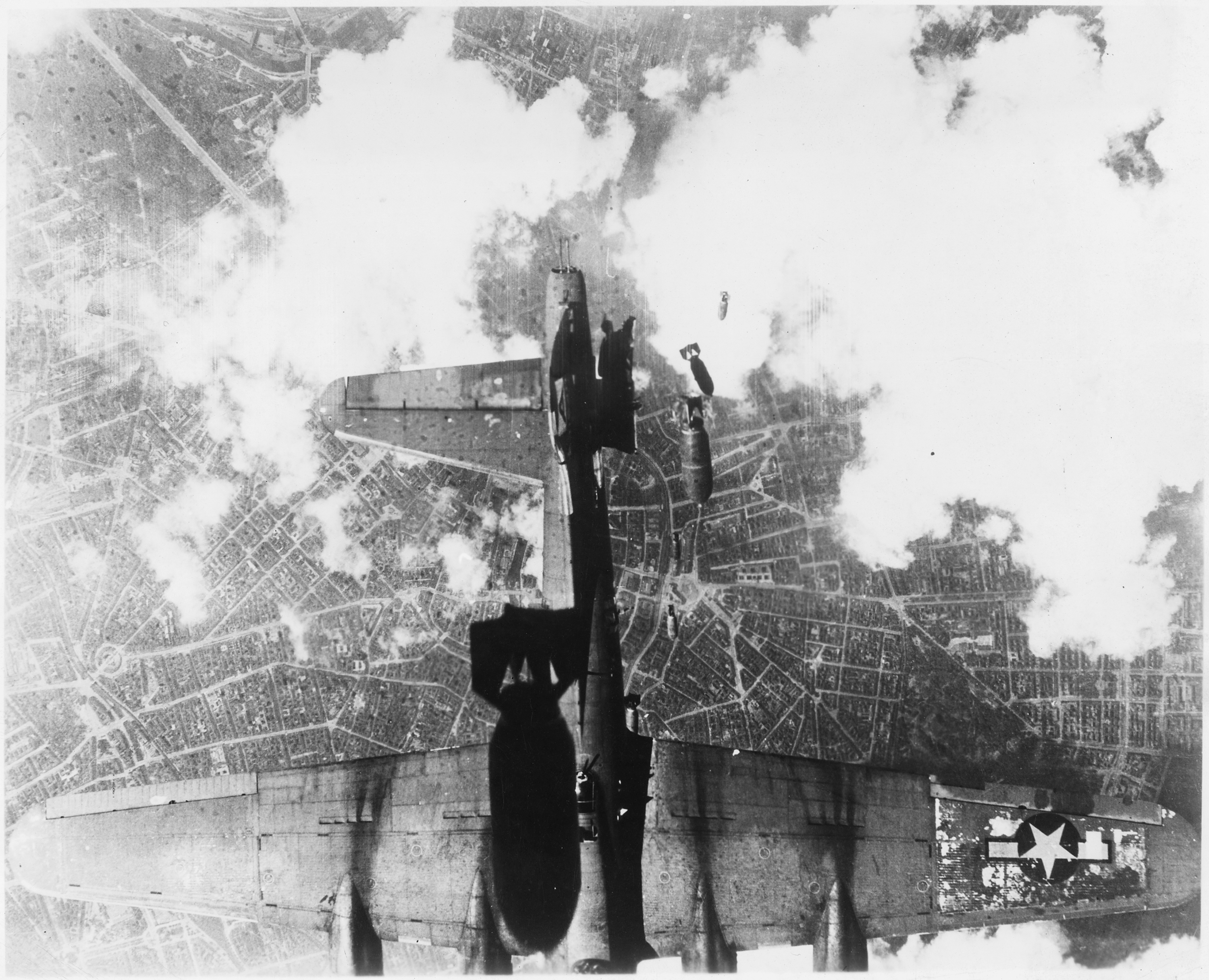
The American B-17 Flying Fortress Miss Donna Mae II under friendly fire after drifting under the American bomber flying above it during the bombing of Berlin in 1944. The loss of the B-17's left horizontal stabilizer to a falling 1,000 lb bomb striking it caused the plane to go into an uncontrollable spin and crash, killing all 11 crew members.

In military terminology, friendly fire or fratricide (Note: From the term for killing one's brother) is an unintentional attack by allied or neutral forces on friendly troops while attempting to attack enemy or hostile targets. Many NATO militaries refer to these incidents as blue on blue. (Note: Derived from military exercises where NATO forces were identified by blue pennants, and units representing Warsaw Pact forces by red pennants.) Examples include misidentifying the target as hostile, cross-fire while engaging an enemy, and long-range ranging errors or inaccuracy. Accidental fire not intended to attack enemy or hostile targets, or deliberate firing on one's own troops for disciplinary reasons, is not called friendly fire, and neither is unintentional harm to civilian or neutral targets, which is sometimes referred to as collateral damage. Training accidents and bloodless incidents also do not qualify as friendly fire in terms of casualty reporting.

Use of the term friendly in a military context for allied personnel started during the First World War, often when shells fell short of the targeted enemy. The term friendly fire was originally adopted by the United States military; S.L.A. Marshall used the term in Men Against Fire in 1947. In classical forms of warfare where hand-to-hand combat dominated, death from a "friendly" was rare, but in modern warfare, deaths from friendly fire are more common.

Friendly fire is not to be confused with fragging, which is the uncondoned intentional (or attempted) killing of servicemen by fellow personnel serving on the same side.

== History ==
Paul R. Syms argues that friendly fire is an ancient phenomenon. He notes recorded events in Ancient Greece and other early accounts of battles. He and other historians also note that weapons such as guns, artillery, and aircraft have dramatically increased friendly-fire casualties.

In the 20th and 21st centuries, friendly-fire casualties have become a significant percentage of combat injuries and fatalities. Jon Krakauer provides an overview of American casualties during and since the Second World War:

While acknowledging that the "statistical dimensions of the friendly fire problem have yet to be defined; reliable data are simply not available in most cases," The Oxford Companion to American Military History estimates that between 2 percent and 25 percent of the casualties in America's wars are attributable to friendly fire.

== Under-reporting ==
In the annals of warfare, deaths at the hand of the enemy are often valorized, while those at the hand of friendly forces may be cast in shame. Moreover, because public relations and morale are important, especially in modern warfare, the military may be inclined to under-report incidents of friendly fire, especially when in charge of both investigations and press releases:

If fratricide is an untoward but inevitable aspect of warfare, so, too, is the tendency by military commanders to sweep such tragedies under the rug. It's part of a larger pattern: the temptation among generals and politicians to control how the press portrays their military campaigns, which all too often leads them to misrepresent the truth in order to bolster public support for the war of the moment.

— Jon Krakauer, Where Men Win Glory. NY: Bloomsbury, p. 205.

Although there may well be a longstanding history of such bias, Krakauer claims that "the scale and sophistication of these recent propaganda efforts, and the unabashedness of their executors" in Iraq and Afghanistan, is new.

== Causes ==
=== Fog of war ===
Friendly fire can arise from the "fog of war" – the confusion and uncertainty inherent in warfare. Friendly fire that is a result of apparent recklessness or incompetence may be improperly lumped into this category. The concept of the fog of war has come under considerable criticism, as it can be used as an excuse for poor planning, weak or compromised intelligence, or incompetent command.

=== Errors of position ===
Errors of position occur when fire aimed at enemy forces may accidentally end up hitting one's own. Such incidents are exacerbated by close proximity of combatants and were relatively common during the First and Second World Wars, where troops fought in close combat and targeting was relatively inaccurate. As the accuracy of weapons has improved, this class of incident has become less common but still occurs.

=== Errors of identification ===
Errors of identification happen when friendly troops are mistakenly attacked in the belief that they are the enemy. Highly mobile battles, and battles involving troops from many nations, are more likely to cause this kind of incident, as evidenced by incidents in the 1991 Persian Gulf War, or the shooting down of a British aircraft by a U.S. Patriot battery during the 2003 invasion of Iraq. In the Tarnak Farm incident in Afghanistan, four Canadian soldiers were killed and eight others injured when a U.S. Air National Guard major dropped a 500 lb (230 kg) bomb from his F-16 onto the Princess Patricia's Canadian Light Infantry regiment, which was conducting a night firing exercise near Kandahar. Another case of such an accident was the death of Pat Tillman in Afghanistan, although the exact circumstances of that incident are yet to be definitively determined.

During World War II, "invasion stripes" were painted on Allied aircraft to assist identification in preparation for the invasion of Normandy. Similar markings had been used when the Hawker Typhoon was first introduced into use, as it was otherwise very similar in profile to a German aircraft. Late in the war the "protection squadron" that covered the elite German jet fighter squadron as it landed or took off were brightly painted to distinguish them from raiding Allied fighters.

=== Errors of response inhibition ===
Errors of response inhibition have recently been proposed as another potential cause of some friendly-fire accidents. These types of errors are different from visual misidentification, and instead appear to be caused by a failure to inhibit a shooting response.

A number of situations can lead to or exacerbate the risk of friendly fire. Difficult terrain and visibility are major factors. Soldiers fighting on unfamiliar ground can become disoriented more easily than on familiar terrain. The direction from which enemy fire comes may not be easy to identify, and poor weather conditions and combat stress may add to the confusion, especially if fire is exchanged. Accurate navigation and fire discipline are vital. In high-risk situations, leaders need to ensure that units are properly informed of the location of friendly units and must issue clear, unambiguous orders, but they must also react correctly to responses from soldiers who are capable of using their own judgement. Miscommunication can be deadly. Radios, field telephones, and signalling systems can be used to address the problem, but when these systems are used to co-ordinate multiple forces such as ground troops and aircraft, their breakdown can dramatically increase the risk of friendly fire. When allied troops are operating, the situation is even more complex, especially with language barriers to overcome.

== Impact reduction ==
Some analyses dismiss the material impact of friendly fire, by concluding that friendly-fire casualties are usually too few to affect the outcome of a battle. The effects of friendly fire, however, are not just material. Troops expect to be targeted by the enemy, but being hit by their own forces has a huge negative effect on morale. Forces may doubt the competence of their command, and its prevalence makes commanders more cautious in the field.

Attempts to reduce this effect by military leaders involve identifying the causes of friendly fire and overcoming repetition of the incident through training, tactics and technology.

=== Training ===
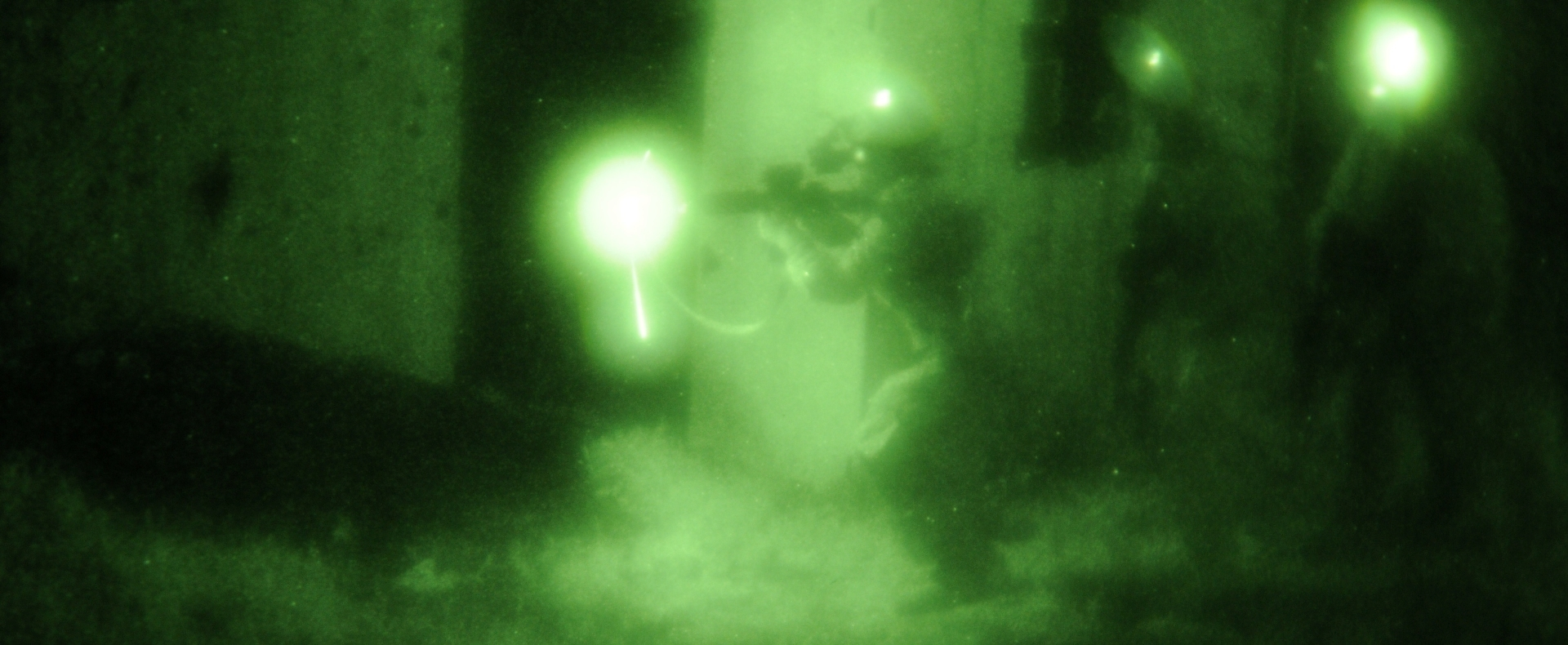
Soldiers perform a night assault at Camp Atterbury Joint Maneuver Training Center during Bold Quest 2011, a combat assessment exercise to test the interoperability of target identification systems of different allied nations to reduce friendly fire incidents.

Most militaries use extensive training to ensure troop safety as part of normal coordination and planning, but soldiers are not always trained under possible friendly-fire situations to ensure they are aware of situations where the risk is high. Difficult terrain and bad weather cannot be controlled, but soldiers must be trained to operate effectively in these conditions, as well as being trained to fight at night. Such simulated training is now commonplace for soldiers worldwide. Avoiding friendly fire can be as straightforward as ensuring that fire discipline is instilled in troops, so that they fire, and cease firing, when they are told to. Firing ranges now also include "don't fire" targets.

In American actions, the increasing sophistication of weaponry, and the tactics employed against American forces to deliberately confuse them, has meant that while overall casualties have fallen for American soldiers in the late 20th and 21st centuries, the overall percentage of deaths due to friendly fire has risen dramatically. In the 1991 Gulf War, most of the Americans killed by their own forces were crew members of armored vehicles hit by anti-tank rounds. The response in training includes recognition training for Apache helicopter crews to help them distinguish American tanks and armored vehicles at night and in bad weather from those of the enemy. In addition, tank gunners must watch for "friendly" robotic tanks that pop out on training courses in California's Mojave Desert. They also study video footage to help them recognize American forces in battle more quickly.

=== Technological fixes ===
Improved technology to assist in identifying friendly forces is also an ongoing response to friendly fire problems. From the earliest days of warfare, identification systems were visual, such as extremely elaborate suits of armour with distinctive heraldic patterns. During the Napoleonic Wars, Admiral Nelson ordered that ships under his command adopt a common paint scheme to reduce friendly-fire incidents; this pattern became known as the Nelson Chequer. Invasion stripes served a similar function during the Allied invasion of Normandy in World War II. When radar was developed during World War II, IFF ("Identification friend or foe") systems to identify aircraft developed into a multitude of radio beacons.

Correct navigation is vital to ensuring that units know where they are in relation to their own force and the enemy. Providing accurate compasses inside metal enclosures such as tanks and trucks has proven difficult, so GPS was a major breakthrough.

Other technological changes include hand-held navigational devices that use satellite signals, giving ground forces the exact location of enemy forces as well as their own. Infrared lights and thermal tape that are invisible to observers without night-goggles, or fibres and dyes that reflect only specific wavelengths, are developing into key identifiers for friendly infantry units at night.

Remote sensors have also been developed to detect enemy vehicles, such as the Remotely Monitored Battlefield Sensor System (REMBASS), which uses a combination of acoustic, seismic vibration, and infrared to detect and identify vehicles.

=== Tactics ===
Some tactics make friendly fire virtually inevitable, such as the practice of dropping barrages of mortars on enemy machine gun posts in the final moments before capture. This practice continued throughout the 20th century after machine guns were first introduced in World War I. The high friendly-fire risk has generally been accepted, since machine gun emplacements are tactically so valuable and so dangerous that shells have been considered far less deadly than the machine guns. Tactical adjustments include the use of "kill boxes", or zones that are placed off-limits to ground forces while allied aircraft attack targets, which goes back to the beginning of military aircraft in World War I.

The shock and awe battle tactics adopted by the American military – overwhelming power, battlefield awareness, dominant maneuvers, and spectacular displays of force – are employed because they are believed to be the best way to win a war quickly and decisively, reducing casualties on both sides. However, if the only combatants are American, then a high percentage of total casualties are bound to be a result of friendly fire, blunting the effectiveness of the shock-and-awe tactic. According to a source, it is likely that the fact that friendly fire has proven to be the only fundamental weakness of shock-and-awe tactics that has caused the American military to take significant steps to overturn a blasé attitude to friendly fire and assess ways to eliminate it.

=== Markings ===
During Operation Husky, codename for the Allied invasion of Sicily, American C-47 transport planes were mistakenly fired upon by American ground and naval forces on the night of 11 July 1943. Twenty-three planes were shot down and 37 damaged, resulting in 318 casualties, with 60 airmen and 81 paratroopers killed. This led to the development of Invasion stripes, which were used during D-Day as a visible way to prevent friendly fire.

During the Russian invasion of Ukraine the Z (military symbol) has been used on Russian vehicles as a form of marking. There are various explanations as to the reason for it; one is that both sides are using the same equipment. Ukrainian forces have responded by using visible Ukrainian flags on their vehicles, as well as "+" and triangular tactical markings. The picture has become more confused as both sides are using captured or abandoned equipment, such as tanks.

== Examples ==
Incidents include: the killing of Royalist commander the Earl of Kingston by Royalist cannon fire during the English Civil War; the bombing of American troops by Eighth Air Force bombers during Operation Cobra in World War II; the attack on the Royal Navy 1st Minesweeping Flotilla off Cap d'Antifer, Le Havre by 263 Squadron and 266 Squadron RAF on 27 August 1944, sinking HMS Britomart and Hussar, and irreparably damaging HMS Salamander, killing 117 sailors and wounding 153 more; the eight-hour firefight between British units during the Cyprus Emergency; the sinking of the German destroyers Leberecht Maass and Max Schultz by the Luftwaffe in the North Sea during World War II; the downing of a British Army Gazelle helicopter by a British warship during the Falklands War; the downing of two U.S. Army Black Hawk helicopters by USAF fighters in 1994 during the Iraqi no-fly zones; the shooting down and killing of Italo Balbo, the Italian governor of Libya, over Tobruk by Italian anti aircraft fire in 1940; the killing of Pat Tillman; the accidental shooting of Stonewall Jackson during the American Civil War; the killing of a Royal Military Policeman by a British sniper during the war in Afghanistan; and the Tarnak Farm incident, when US Air National Guard pilots in 2002 bombed 12 Canadian soldiers, four of whom were killed; these were the first Canadian casualties of the war in Afghanistan. In 2026, Kuwait accidentally shot down three US F-15s, with all crew surviving.

== See also ==
- A Second Knock at the Door (2011 documentary film)
- Friendly Fire, 1979 television docudrama about a high-profile friendly fire incident during the Vietnam War
- Identification friend or foe (IFF), aviation technology
