= Financial crime =

Crime against property

Financial crime is any illegal activity involving money, finance or financial systems committed to secure personal or organizational gain. It includes crimes committed against property, involving the unlawful conversion of the ownership of property to one's own personal use and benefit. Financial crime covers a wide spectrum of illicit acts.

Financial crimes may involve fraud (cheque fraud, credit card fraud, mortgage fraud, medical fraud, corporate fraud, securities fraud, bank fraud, insider trading, insurance fraud, market manipulation, payment (point of sale) fraud, health care fraud); scams or confidence tricks; tax evasion; bribery; embezzlement; extortion and blackmail; identity theft; money laundering and terrorist financing; and forgery and counterfeiting, including the production of counterfeit money and consumer goods. Financial crimes may be carried out by individuals, corporations, or by organized crime groups. Victims may include individuals, corporations, governments, and entire economies.

Financial crimes may also involve additional criminal acts, such as computer crime and elder abuse and even violent crimes including robbery, armed robbery or murder.

Law enforcement often classifies larger forms of financial collusion as criminal syndicates.

== Fraud ==
Fraud involves intentional deception to deprive a victim of a legal right or to gain from a victim unlawfully or unfairly. Some of the main categories of fraud include:

- Identity theft: Stealing someone's personal data to commit crimes, open accounts, purchase goods and services or take out loans.
- Cyber and online fraud: Crimes utilizing the internet, including phishing, hacking and ransomware attacks to steal funds or data; mule accounts to launder money; crypto and investment scams used to steal digital assets.
- Corporate and securities fraud: Intentional misrepresentation of financial statements or investment scams like Ponzi and pyramid schemes to deceive investors; market manipulation; insider theft of proprietary data or information for personal gain.
- Insurance, public sector and healthcare fraud: Filing false claims or inflating damages to wrongfully collect insurance, welfare payouts, or healthcare payments.
- Banking and credit card fraud: Unauthorized use of cards, check forgery or application fraud to steal from financial institutions or individuals.

In 2005, fraud within the financial industry was estimated to cost the UK £14 billion a year. In 2025, the UK Home Office estimated the economic and social cost of fraud in 2023–2024 against individuals and businesses to be in excess of £14 billion. This consists of £9 billion affecting individuals and over £5 billion affecting businesses.

With the increases in digital transaction volumes, fraud and cybersecurity have become increasingly intertwined. Fraud and financial crime patterns have become more digital and faster changing, leveraging the underlying characteristics of the underlying digital payments infrastructures. This makes traditional rule based systems less effective and has encouraged greater use of machine learning and AI-based fraud detection techniques.

Powered by emerging generative AI capabilities and technical investments, criminal organizations have also ramped up their capability to commit financial crimes and fraud in recent years. An Interpol director recently summarized the challenges as: "We are facing an epidemic in the growth of financial fraud, leading to individuals, often vulnerable people, and companies being defrauded on a massive and global scale."

== Corruption, Bribery and Extortion ==
Corruption is the abuse of entrusted power of authority for personal or private gain. It involves dishonest, illegal or unethical behaviour by individuals in power, such as politicians, public officials or business executives, who exploit their position for unfair advantage. Common forms of corruption include bribery, embezzlement and extortion.

Bribery is defined generally as corrupt solicitation, acceptance or transfer of value in exchange for official action. It refers to the offering, giving, soliciting or receiving of any item of value as means of influencing the actions of an individual holding a public or legal duty. Solicitation of a bribe also constitutes a crime. The U.S. introduced the Foreign Corrupt Practices Act in 1977 to address bribery of foreign officials. This legislation dominated international anti-corruption enforcement until around 2010 when other countries began introducing broader and more robust legislation, notably the United Kingdom Bribery Act 2010. The International Organization for Standardization introduced an international anti-bribery management system standard in 2016. In recent years, cooperation in enforcement action between countries has increased. In 2016, Grupo Odebrecht, one of the largest construction firms in Latin America, made a settlement of $2.6 billion with authorities in the US and Switzerland, after executives confessed to paying bribes for contracts in Brazil and more than 10 other countries.

Embezzlement occurs where an individual misappropriates money, property or assets that have been lawfully entrusted to their care. It is a breach of trust, where the offender has legitimate, lawful access to assets, due to their job, role or relationship but chooses to misuse that authority for personal gain. In June 2026, Peter Murrell, former Chief Executive of the Scottish National Party and estranged husband of the former First Minister of Scotland, Nicola Sturgeon, was sentenced to five years in prison for embezzling more than £400,000 from the SNP.

Extortion is the wrongful use of actual or threatened force, violence or intimidation to gain money or property from an individual or entity. It generally involves a threat being made to the victim's personal property or to their family and friends. While the threat of violence or property damage is commonplace, it can also involve reputational harm. The main forms include blackmail, protection rackets and cyber extortion, including ransomware. In recent years, the rapid proliferation of technology has facilitated forms of cyber extortion that typically involve the use of malicious software that restricts access to IT systems until payment demands are met. Blackmail is a form of extortion in which, rather than physical harm, the threat is the exposure of damaging information related to the victim. In 2025, three individuals were convicted of a plot to extort €15 million from the family of former Formula 1 champion Michael Schuhmacher. They had threatened to cause reputational harm by publishing defamatory material on the dark web.

== Market Abuse and Financial Manipulation ==
Market Abuse occurs when a person or group of people act to disadvantage other investors in financial markets. It involves illegal practices that undermine market integrity, distort asset pricing and disadvantage unsuspecting investors. There are three main types of Market Abuse: Insider Dealing; Market Manipulation; and Unlawful Disclosure. In the UK, for example, these offences are heavily regulated by the Financial Conduct Authority (FCA) under the UK Market Abuse Regulation (UK MAR) and the Financial Services and Markets Act (FSMA).

Insider Dealing arises where a person uses inside information to conduct a transaction in a financial instrument to which that inside information relates. Inside information is of a precise nature, it is not public, it relates to an issuer or issuers of financial instruments, and if it is made public would have a significant effect on prices. In 2012, Matthew Kluger, a lawyer who had worked at some of the most prestigious law firms in the US, was sentenced to a record 12 years in prison for running a $37 million insider trading scheme over a period of 17 years.

Market Manipulation occurs when someone artificially affects the supply or demand for a security, for example causing prices to rise or fall. It may involve techniques such as spreading false or misleading information about a company; engaging in a series of transactions to make a security appear more actively traded; and, rigging quotes, prices or trades to make it look like there is more or less demand for security than is the case. In 2021, the French Autorité des Marchés Financiers (AMF) fined Amundi Asset Management and Amundi Intermediation a total of €32 million. They were found guilty of price manipulation and wash trading, particularly in Euro Stoxx 50 futures. Two former employees were banned for ten years from market activity.

Unlawful Disclosure of inside information arises where a person possesses insider information and discloses that information to any other person, except where the disclosure is made in the normal exercise of employment, a profession or duties. In 2022, the British FCA fined Sir Christopher Gent, former non-executive chair of ConvaTech Group, £80,000 for unlawfully disclosing inside information. The disclosures concerned an expected announcement by ConvaTech related to a revision of financial guidance and the CEO's plans for retirement.

== Money Laundering and Terrorist Financing ==
For most countries, money laundering and terrorist financing raise significant issues with regard to prevention, detection and prosecution. Sophisticated techniques used to launder money and finance terrorism add to the complexity of these issues. Such sophisticated techniques may involve different types of financial institutions; multiple financial transactions; the use of intermediaries, such as financial advisers, accountants, shell corporations and other service providers; transfers to, through, and from different countries; and the use of different financial instruments and other kinds of value-storing assets. Money laundering is, however, a fundamentally simple concept. It is the process by which proceeds from a criminal activity are disguised to conceal their true origin. Basically, money laundering involves the proceeds of criminally derived property rather than the property itself. Money laundering can be defined in a number of ways, most countries subscribe to the definition adopted by the United Nations Convention Against Illicit Traffic in Narcotic Drugs and Psychotropic Substances (1988) (Vienna Convention) and the United Nations Convention Against Transnational Organized Crime (2000) (Palermo Convention):

i. The conversion or transfer of property, knowing that such property is derived from any (drug trafficking) offense or offenses or from an act of participation in such offense or offenses, for the purpose of concealing or disguising the illicit origin of the property or of assisting any person who is involved in the commission of such an offense or offenses to evade the legal consequences of his actions;

ii. The concealment or disguise of the true nature, source, location, disposition, movement, rights with respect to, or ownership of property, knowing that such property is derived from an offense or offenses or from an act of participation in such an offense or offenses, and;

iii. The acquisition, possession or use of property, knowing at the time of receipt that such property was derived from an offense or offenses or from an act of Participation in such offense or offenses.

The Financial Action Task Force on Money Laundering (FATF), which is recognized as the international standard setter for Anti-money Laundering (AML) efforts, defines the term "money laundering" briefly as "the processing of criminal proceeds to disguise their illegal origin" in order to "legitimize" the ill-gotten gains of crime.

In 2005, money laundering within the financial industry in the UK was believed to amount to £25bn a year. In 2009, a United Nations Office on Drugs and Crime (UNODC) study estimated that criminal proceeds amounted to 3.6% of global GDP, with 2.7% (or $1.6 trillion) being laundered. In 2026, this baseline percentage continues to be the basis of global UN estimates and equates to $800 billion to $2 trillion.

Underlying illegal offences generate illicit funds that are subsequently laundered. In the European Union, there are 22 categories of such crimes, including: arms trafficking; bribery; corruption; counterfeiting; cybercrime; drug trafficking; environmental crime; extortion; financing of terrorism; forgery; fraud; human trafficking; insider trading; racketeering; sexual exploitation; tax evasion and theft.

The Irish Department of Housing urged minister Darragh O’Brien to “ask in the strongest terms for the UAE to account for its relationship to Daniel Kinahan” a drug kingpin charged along with his brother, Christopher Kinahan in 2018 by the High Court of controlling and managing the daily drug operations in Ireland. The Kinahan brothers are sons of the Kinahan Cartel founder, Christy Kinahan Senior, who smuggled drugs and firearms into the UK, Ireland, and mainland Europe for a long time. For several years, the Kinahan leadership had been residing in Dubai, where Daniel denied his involvement in organized crime by defending himself as a ‘high-profile businessman in the professional boxing industry’. According to a Panorama investigation, Daniel has operated in the boxing industry through MTK and simultaneously operated Europe’s biggest money laundering, drug trafficking, and gangland executions networks from Dubai. A spokesperson for minister O’Brien said, “respect for human rights is a cornerstone of Ireland’s foreign policy,” when asked if the minister would raise the concerns regarding Daniel’s presence and operations in Dubai on his visit in March 2022 for St Patrick’s Day. Daniel Kinahan was extradited from Dubai to Ireland in August 2026, where he faces charges relating to organized crime.

== Other Financial Crime ==
Other financial crimes include tax evasion and counterfeiting of e.g. currencies, consumer goods and pharmaceuticals.

Tax evasion is defined by the HM Revenue and Customs as a deliberate attempt not to pay tax which is due. It is treated as a subset of tax fraud and covers a wide range of illegal activities, including the deliberate submission of false tax returns, falsely claiming repayments of reliefs, hiding income, gains or wealth offshore, or smuggling taxable goods. Tax fraud undermines economic activity and supports crime. In 2021, the EU Tax Observatory estimated that more than $170 billion in tax revenues is lost globally due to tax evasion by individuals using offshore financial structures. In 2018, two men were sentenced to lengthy prison terms in Australia for one of the largest tax fraud schemes ever detected. They established a network of international and domestic companies, which they used to create fake losses overseas to evade A$135 million in corporate tax. Additionally, a web of false identities was created to aid deception, and money was siphoned through the UK, Hong Kong and the UAE using fake companies.

Counterfeiting occurs when a person intentionally copies or imitates an item without authorization and represents the imitation as genuine. While counterfeiting is most commonly associated with currency, it also applies to consumer goods, such as designer clothing, handbags or watches, pharmaceuticals and other trademarked products. Estimates by the OECD suggest that in 2021, global trade in counterfeit goods reached an estimated value in excess of $460 billion, representing 2.3% of global trade, an amount comparable to the GDP of some OECD member countries. Major categories of counterfeit goods include clothing, footwear, leather goods, watches, electronics, pharmaceuticals, cosmetics, auto parts and pesticides. Counterfeit goods threaten public safety, undermine intellectual property rights and hamper economic growth. In 2023, federal authorities in New York seized more than 219,000 counterfeit handbags, shoes and other luxury merchandise with a total value over $1 billion. It is believed to be the largest ever seizure of counterfeit goods in US history.

== Digital Technologies and Financial Crime ==
Regulators and law enforcement bodies have been aware of the potential for digital technologies to facilitate crime for a number of years. This includes various forms of fraud, as well as extortion through cybercrime mechanisms such as ransomware and Distributed Denial of Service (DDoS) attacks.

Opportunities for criminals to exploit these technologies are evolving, expanding and becoming easier, and this has been recognized by law enforcement bodies and regulators. US regulators have pointed out that higher quality digital technologies are becoming widely available at low cost, making criminal exploitation easier, more likely to be successful, and reducing technical barriers to exploitation. In 2026, the US Department of the Treasury highlighted the potential for criminals to use Artificial Intelligence (AI) tools and other technologies to commit financial crimes. They are, for example, able to create voice clones, fake identification documents, videos with believable depictions of public figures, false and defamatory materials and fake social media profiles. Australian and UK financial regulators have also identified the cross-cutting potential of AI, and other digital technologies, to further facilitate a range of financial crimes.

A report by Europol highlighted the growth in availability for criminals of advanced digital technologies through the emergence of "crime-as-a-service business model". This outsourced model provides criminals with easy, low cost access to illicit digital products and technical services, including secure websites and other infrastructure that can host illegal activities or materials. These can be hired or purchased by criminals who are not particularly IT literate, enabling them to perform illegal activities that would otherwise require expert knowledge of technology.

In addition to the cybercrimes of ransomware, DDoS attacks and malware, digital technologies facilitate other financial crimes, which has become a large-scale problem. These include:

- Financially motivated sextortion: Criminals use digital technologies to coerce victims to create and send sexually explicit images or videos of themselves, then threaten to release the material on the Dark web, public platforms or to friends and family, unless the victim provides payment. Perpetrators use generative AI tools and deepfakes, especially when victims refuse to send sexually explicit material. Payments to blackmailers are often made via virtual currencies.
- Fraud: Various law enforcement and regulatory bodies have identified forms of fraud that have been facilitated by new digital technologies. UK and US regulators are especially concerned about the potential for AI and deepfake tools to allow criminals to steal identities, create fake documents, open bank accounts and take out loans. There is also the emergence of CEO Fraud, whereby digital technologies are used to impersonate senior managers and to instruct more junior staff to make illegal transfers of financial resources or assets to the bank accounts of criminals. Other online payment fraud schemes have been identified by Europol and include phishing, account takeovers, investment scams, romance fraud, digital skimming and ATM attacks.
- KYC checks, AI and Compliance Extortion: Criminals use generative AI and other tools to scrape the public footprint of a company, business executive or high-profile individual to create large numbers of negative press articles, fake regulatory complaints or false links to financial fraud, sanction evasion or other forms of crime. Criminals then blackmail victims knowing that if financial institutions detect the misinformation during their KYC due diligence processes, e.g. while adverse media screening, the victims will be de-banked to avoid regulatory risk.
- Manipulation of financial markets: Digital technologies can create false information, including documents, videos, news articles and press releases, that can artificially inflate or deflate the price of financial securities or disrupt financial markets more generally. Misinformation can also be created that undermines the reputation of individual businesses or investors, potentially affecting negatively economic activity.
- Money Laundering: Digital technologies are used to overcome the extensive KYC and other checks used by financial institutions to prevent money laundering. Mechanisms include breaking up large transactions into irregular, sub-threshold micro-transactions using automated tools, creating synthetic bank accounts with a track record of transactions, onboarding money mules, and creating fake IDs capable of circumventing sophisticated automatic checks. AI video tools can be used to overcome biometric tests, e.g. by animating stolen static photos in real time.

== Law enforcement and combating financial crime ==
Combating financial crime involves a wide range of law enforcement and regulatory agencies. Some focus on criminal violations of the tax code, while others focus on different forms of financial crime, particularly fraud, market abuse, money laundering, corruption, bribery, extortion and counterfeiting. Overall approaches differ by nation state but often reflect global practice or the influence of major financial centres, such as the US, UK or Singapore. E.g. the City of London Police provides access to best practice for preventing, detecting and investigating economic and cybercrime to governments worldwide through its Economics and Cyber Crime Academy (ECCA). Their approaches to combatting money laundering take into the account the recommendations of the Financial Action Task Force (FATF), the origins of which lie in the approach set out in the United States Bank Secrecy Act of 1970.

=== United Kingdom ===
The City of London Police is the national lead for detection, investigation and enforcement of fraud and works alongside the National Crime Agency (NCA) and Crown Prosecution Service (CPS). Complex cases of fraud, bribery, extortion and corruption are investigated by the Serious Fraud Office (SFO). Financial crime involving market manipulation or abuse is regulated by the Financial Conduct Authority (FCA) with the support of the SFO and NCA. Responsibility for combating money laundering lies primarily with the NCA and its specialized UK Financial Intelligence Unit (UKFIU). The lead law enforcement agency for tackling counterfeiting is the NCA, supported by the City of London Police's Police Intellectual Property Crime Unit (PIPCU), along with Border Force and local Trading Standards offices. Tax evasion is handled by His Majesty's Revenue and Customs (HMRC) using its specialized law enforcement and criminal investigation powers that are similar to those of the police.

Law enforcement agencies are also responding to the opportunities for financial crime created by digital technologies. In 2024, the NCA shut down an online platform that allowed criminals to make fraudulent phone calls, at low cost and with on-going technical support, to steal money from hundreds of thousands of people globally. It was a sophisticated crime-as-a-service operation that enabled criminals to defraud victims by impersonating legitimate callers such as banks or credit card companies.

=== United States ===
Federal fraud law enforcement is led primarily by the US Department of Justice (DOJ) through its National Fraud Enforcement Division, supported by the Federal Bureau of Investigation (FBI). The FBI is also the primary investigative body targeting public corruption and bribery at all levels of government. Its activities are coordinated by the Public Integrity Section (PIN). The US Securities and Exchange Commission (SEC) and Commodities Futures Trading Commission (CFTC) investigate, prevent and prosecute market manipulation and market abuse. Money laundering is combated through coordinated investigations by specialist agencies including the FBI, the Internal Revenue Service (IRS) and the US Department of Homeland Security. Relevant information is collected and analyzed by the Financial Crimes Enforcement Network (FinCEN). The IRS Criminal Investigation is the primary lead agency for investigating criminal tax violations, tax evasion, identity theft and international tax fraud. It is supported by the Tax Division of the DOJ. Action to combat counterfeiting, targeting fake money, unauthorized goods and criminal networks, involves specialized agencies such as the US Secret Service for currency and the US Customs and Border Protection for counterfeit goods. US Homeland Security and the FBI target large-scale trafficking in counterfeit trademarked merchandise within the United States.

Federal law enforcement agencies have identified and combated a large number of major financial crimes, e.g. Operation Goldrush, which successfully ended one of the largest healthcare fraud cases ever prosecuted by the Federal government. An international crime network used medical device companies and personal data stolen from more than 1 million US citizens to bill Medicare for medical equipment that was never needed or received by patients in the amount of $10.5 billion.

=== Singapore ===
Fraud law enforcement is primarily undertaken by the Commercial Affairs Department (CAD) of the Singapore Police Force (SPF). It investigates complex corporate frauds and large-scale financial crime. It is also responsible for combating money laundering and financial market abuse. Bribery and corruption are targeted by the independent Corrupt Practices Investigations Bureau (CPIB), which was established in 1952. Tax compliance, including detecting and prosecuting tax evasion, is enforced through the Inland Revenue Authority of Singapore (IRAS). Strict anti-counterfeiting laws are enforced by the Intellectual Property Rights Branch of the Singapore Police Force (IPRB), supported by the Immigration and Checkpoint Authority (ICA).

In 2024, the Ministry of Digital Development and Information prevented a widespread extortion campaign that targeted government ministers and over 100 public officials. Fraudsters sent coordinated emails featuring officials' faces superimposed onto comprising photos using deepfake technology.

== See also ==
- Black market
- Credit card fraud
- Financial Crimes Enforcement Network
- Financing of terrorism
- Fraud
- Greenmail
- Grey market
- Mafia
- Money laundering
- Organized crime
- Securities fraud
- Skimming (casinos)
- Skimming (fraud)
- Structuring (smurfing)
- Tax haven
- White-collar crime
- World Bank residual model
- Wood laundering
