= Corruption in San Marino =

Overview of corruption in San Marino

Despite its size, limited infrastructure, and tiny population, there are still incidences of corruption in San Marino. Notable cases include political corruption, judicial inefficiencies, and corruption in the public procurement processes.

== Background ==
As a parliamentary democracy, San Marino has been recognized as a country that generally upholds political rights and civil liberties. It also holds regular elections, while its government and judiciary exercise their functions without improper interference from external actors or unelected entities.

In terms of political corruption, San Marino is cited for the heavy fines it imposes for defamation. Such penalties created a culture of self-censorship, particularly on the part of journalists, who are hampered in their ability to report and investigate governmental transparency and accountability. Those who are found liable are not allowed to appeal their conviction. This is aggravated by the lack of a code of conduct that would have required members of the Parliament and the judiciary to declare conflicts of interest and declare their assets.

The lack of oversight as well as of codes of conduct have led to several corruption problems, such as those committed in the public procurement processes. There is a lack of stringent mechanisms that would have ensured transparency and accountability. This aggravates the incidence of corruption, as public officials are shielded from public scrutiny. Also, San Marino has no independent anti-corruption body that could have investigated and prosecuted graft and corruption cases.

Corruption problems also persist in the financial sector. The country is identified as a tax haven, with its financial sector facilitating financial crimes, cases of embezzlement, and misuse of funds. For instance, authorities confiscated more than one hundred million euros owned by a Sicilian entrepreneur suspected of being used to fund Sicilian mafia clans.

== Reform ==
Through the years, San Marino has adopted several measures to address corruption. By 2022, it has adopted a code of conduct that will govern councilors in the legislature in response to the call for enhanced transparency. A year later, the country introduced changes to its anti-money laundering legislation to address deficiencies identified by the Council of Europe as facilitating financial crimes.
