= Copper sheathing =

Ship hull covering

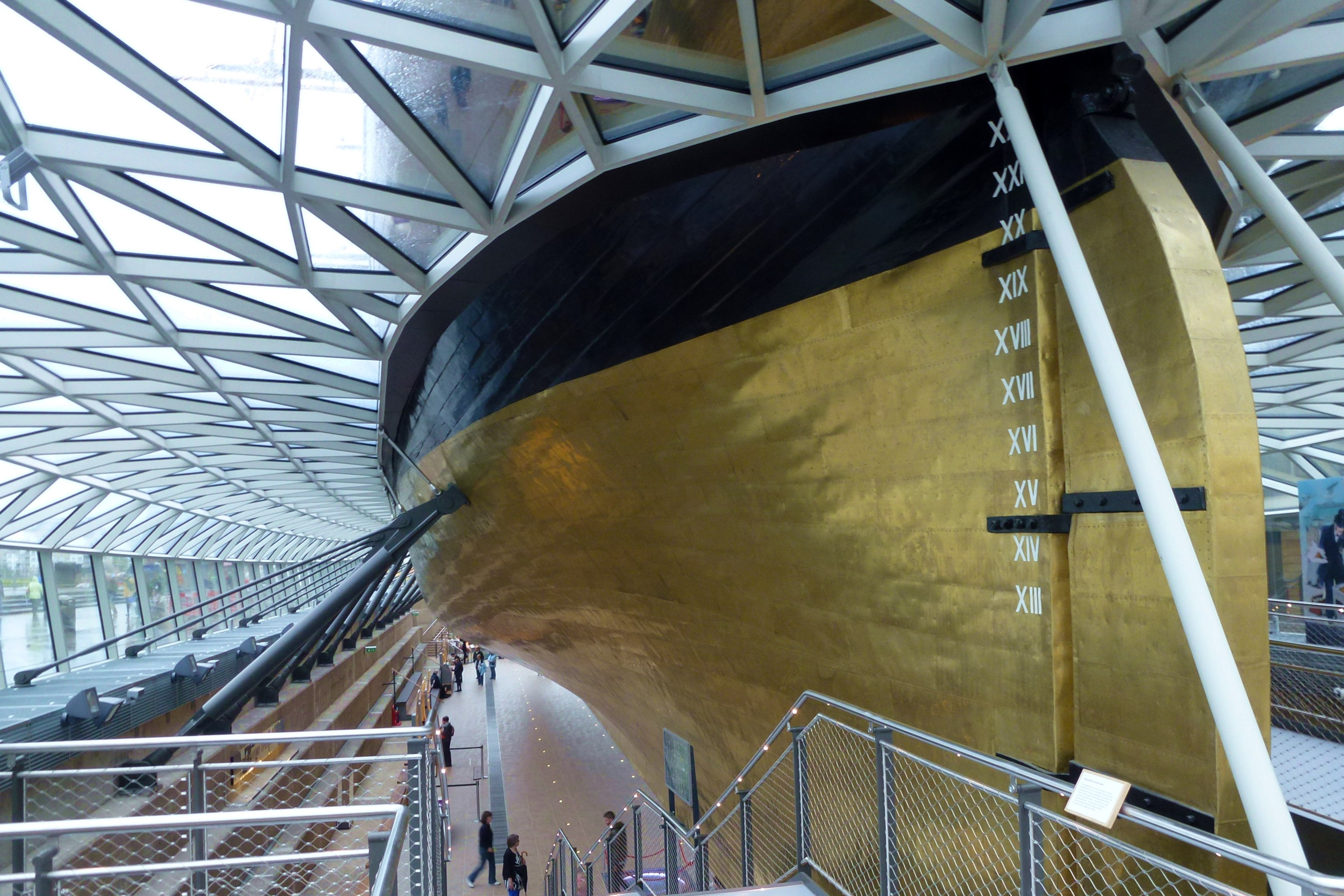
The metal sheathing of Cutty Sark, made from the copper alloy Muntz metal

Copper sheathing is a method for protecting the hull of a wooden vessel from attack by shipworm, barnacles and other marine growth through the use of copper plates affixed to the surface of the hull, below the waterline. It was pioneered and developed by the Royal Navy during the 18th century. In antiquity, ancient Vietnamese and later Chinese used copper plates while ancient Greeks used lead plates to protect the underwater hull.

== Development ==
Deterioration of the hull of a wooden ship was a significant problem for timber hulls. Ships' hulls were under continuous attack by shipworm, barnacles and other marine growth, all of which had some adverse effect on the ship, be it structurally, in the case of the worm, or affecting speed and handling in the case of the weeds. The most common methods of dealing with these problems were through the use of wood, and sometimes lead, sheathing. Expendable wood sheathing effectively provided a non-structural skin to the hull for the worm to attack, and could be easily replaced in dry dock at regular intervals. However, weed grew rapidly and slowed ships. Lead sheathing, while more effective than wood in mitigating these problems, reacted badly with the iron bolts of the ships.

Even older than the sheathing methods were the various graving and paying techniques. There were three main substances used: white stuff, which was a mixture of whale oil, rosin and brimstone; black stuff, a mixture of tar and pitch; and brown stuff, which was simply brimstone added to black stuff. It was common practice to coat the hull with the selected substance, then cover that with a thin outer layer of wooden planking.

Multiple Chinese-language sources from the antiquity record the existence of "copper ships" associated with the Việt/Yue peoples of Northern Vietnam. A 4th century reference appears in the Shui Jing Zhu (Commentary on the Water Classic) by Li Daoyuan: “In the river there are copper ships cast by the Kings of the Việt. When the river tide recede, people are able to see them.” (江中有越王所鑄銅船，潮水退時，人有見之者). A similar statement is found in the 4th century Jiaozhou Ji (Records of Jiaozhou) by Liu Xinqi: “The Việt people cast copper to make ships; when the tides of the river recede, they can be seen.” (越人鑄銅爲船，在江潮退時見). These accounts suggest that copper vessels were sufficiently well known to be remarked upon by multiple authors. Furthermore, the fact that the copper could only be seen during the ebb tide strongly suggests that copper was only attached to the bottom of the hull, rather than a hull made entirely of copper. It is possible that some southern group of shipwrights in those ages had the services of smiths who beat metal into plates fit for nailing to the hulls of their craft to protect the timbers.

References to copper ships continue into the ninth century, where they appear in descriptions of maritime trade between Guangzhou and Annam. In the 10th century Lingbiao Lu Yi (Records of the Strange Beyond the Passes), Liu Xun writes: “Each year, Guangzhou regularly dispatched copper ships to Annam to conduct trade in goods; the route passed through Diaoli.” (每歲，廣州常發銅船過安南，貨易路經調黎). The practice of sheathing hulls with copper may have continued well into the 2nd millennia in Northern Vietnam and Southern China coasts.

In the west, the practice was suggested by Charles Perry in 1708, though it was rejected by the Navy Board on grounds of high cost and perceived maintenance difficulties. The first experiments with copper sheathing were made in the late 1750s: the bottoms and sides of several ships' keels and false keels were sheathed with copper plates.

In 1761, the experiment was expanded, and the 32-gun frigate HMS Alarm was ordered to have her entire bottom coppered, in response to the terrible condition in which she had returned from service in the West Indies. HMS Alarm was chosen because, in 1761, a letter had been sent regarding the ship's condition, saying that the worms from the waters had taken a significant toll on the ship’s wooden hull. Before the copper plates were applied, the hull was covered with "soft stuff", which was simply hair, yarn and brown paper. The copper performed very well, both in protecting the hull from worm invasion and in preventing weed growth for, when in contact with water, the copper produced a poisonous film, composed mainly of copper oxychloride, that deterred these marine organisms. Furthermore, as this film was slightly soluble, it gradually washed away, leaving no way in which marine life could attach itself to the ship. However, it was soon discovered by the Admiralty that the copper bolts used to hold the plates to the hull had reacted with the iron bolts used in the construction of the ship, rendering many bolts nearly useless. In 1766, because of the poor condition of the iron bolts, Alarm's copper was removed.

After this experiment, and deterred by the unanticipated and not understood galvanic reaction between the copper and iron, lead sheathing was tried again, though it was found to be unsuitable to the task, as the plates tended to fall from the hull alarmingly quickly. By 1764, a second vessel, HMS Dolphin, had been sheathed in copper, specifically to prepare her for a voyage of discovery in tropical waters. Dolphin's hull was inspected in 1768 after the ship had twice circumnavigated the world; there was significant corrosion of the hull's iron components, which had to be replaced. In 1769 another attempt was made at coppering a ship's hull, this time on a new ship that had been constructed using bolts made from a copper alloy. The results were far more favourable this time, but still the problems with the bolting remained. The onset and intensification from 1773 of the American Revolutionary War took the focus off the bolting issue necessary to allow a full-scale coppering programme.

By the 1780s the technology had spread to India. The ruler of Mysore, Tipu Sultan, ordered that all his navy vessels receive copper sheathing after observing the benefits in French and East India Company ships.

== Widespread implementation ==
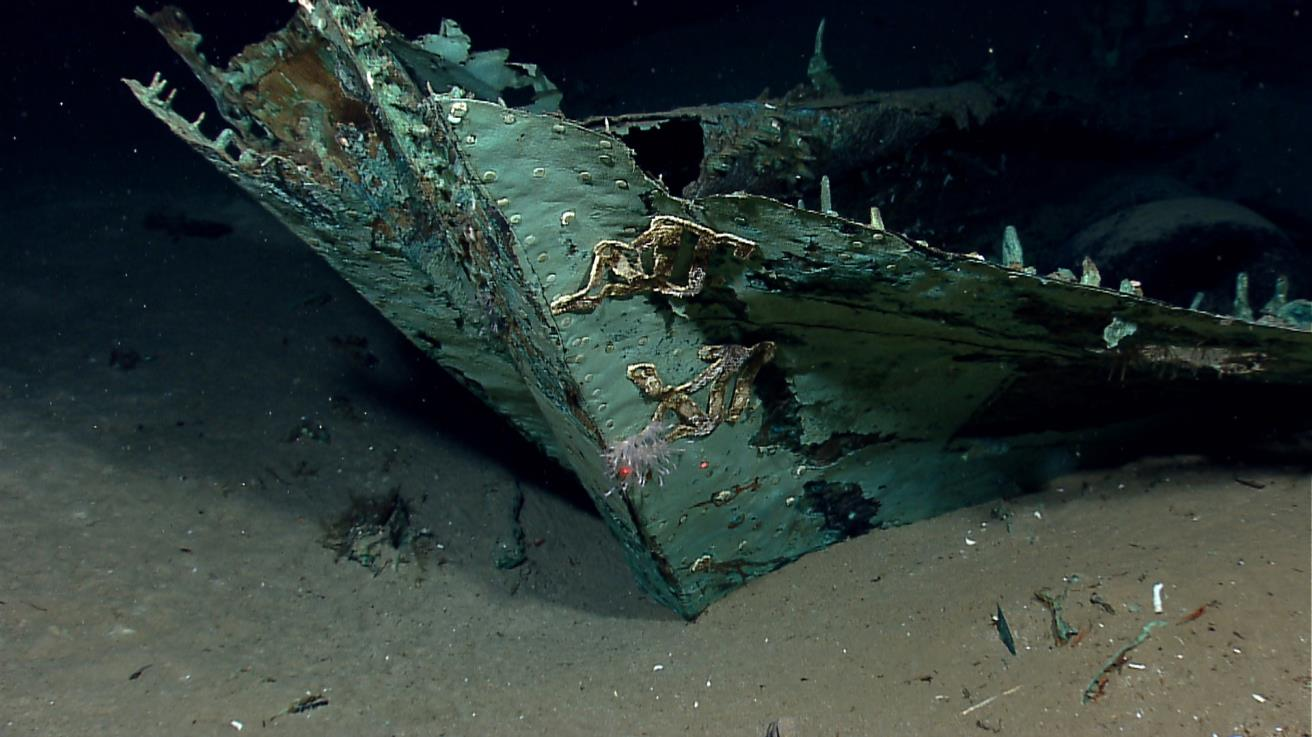
The remains of an early-19th century wooden ship, discovered in 2012 at a depth of 4,000 feet (1,200 m) in the Gulf of Mexico by the NOAAS Okeanos Explorer. Most of the timber has disintegrated, leaving behind the copper sheathing which has preserved the form of the hull.

With the American war in full swing, the Royal Navy set about coppering the bottoms of the entire fleet in 1778. This would not have happened but for war. This also came about because in 1778 a Mr. Fisher, a Liverpool shipbuilder (who did a brisk trade with West Africa) sent a letter to the Navy Board. In it he recommended "copper sheathing" as a solution to the problems of ship worm in warm tropical waters, and the effect on speed of tendrils of seaweed latching onto hulls. The letter itself does not survive and is obliquely referred to in other official correspondence held by the National Maritime Museum; it may have contained or been coincidental with a critical new technical breakthrough of protecting the iron bolting by applying thick paper between the copper plates and the hull. This had recently been trialled successfully (probably) on HMS Jupiter. This breakthrough was to be what would win over the Admiralty.

Fisher's letter was seen by the new Navy Board Controller Charles Middleton, who had the major problem at the time with supplying over 100 ships for the American Revolutionary War (1775–1783), which was compounded that same year (1778) by French opportunism in declaring war on Britain to support the American rebels. This effectively turned what was a local rebellion into a global conflict. Spain followed in 1779 and the Netherlands in 1780, and so Britain had to face its three greatest rivals. Middleton took the view that Britain was "outnumbered at every station", and the Navy was required to "extricate us from present danger". He understood that coppering allowed the navy to stay at sea for much longer without the need for cleaning and repairs to the underwater hull, making it a very attractive, if expensive, proposition. He had to expand the Navy but there was no time to add to the fleet, and limited resources available. It could take five years and 2000 trees to build a warship. However he could refurbish the existing fleet, he grasped Fisher's solution and on 21 January 1779 wrote to the Admiralty. He also petitioned King George III directly on this "matter of the gravest importance" for the necessary funding. He took with him a model of HMS Bellona showing a coppered bottom to illustrate the method. The King backed him for what was an expensive process for an untested technology.

Each ship on average required 15 tonnes of copper applied on average as 300 plates. All the copper was supplied by British mines (the only country in the world at that time that could do so), the largest mine being Parys Mountain in Anglesey, north Wales. The Parys mine had recently begun large-scale production and had glutted the British market with cheap copper; however, the 14 tons of metal required to copper a 74-gun third-rate ship of the line still cost £1,500, compared to £262 for wood. The benefits of increased speed and time at sea were deemed to justify the costs involved. Middleton, in May 1779, placed orders at the Portsmouth Docks for coppering all ships up to and including 32 guns when next they entered dry dock. In July, this order was expanded to include ships of 44 guns and fewer, in total 51 ships within a year. It was then decided that the entire fleet should be coppered, due to the difficulties in maintaining a mixed fleet of coppered and non-coppered ships. By 1781, 82 ships of the line had been coppered, along with fourteen 50-gun ships, 115 frigates, and 182 unrated vessels

All this was too late to avert the loss of the American colonies, however; meanwhile the French were threatening the lucrative sugar trade in the Caribbean, reckoned at the time as being of more importance to British interests than the 13 colonies. The sugar trade was paying for the costs of the American Revolutionary War and the Anglo-French War (1778–1783). The Royal Navy's newly coppered ships, as yet untested, were used successfully by Rodney in defeating the French at the Battle of the Saintes off Dominica in 1782.

By the time the war ended in 1783, problems with the hull bolting were once more becoming apparent. Finally, a suitable alloy for the hull bolts was found, that of copper and zinc. At great cost the Admiralty decided in 1786 to go ahead with the re-bolting of every ship in the navy, thus finally eliminating the bolt corrosion problem. This process lasted several years, after which no significant changes to the coppering system were required and metal plating remained a standard method of protecting a ship's underwater hull until the advent of modern anti-fouling paint. In the 19th century, pure copper was partially superseded by Muntz metal, an alloy of 60% copper, 40% zinc and a trace of iron. Muntz metal had the advantage of being somewhat cheaper than copper.

== Civilian use ==
With its widespread adoption by the Royal Navy, some shipping owners employed the method on their merchant vessels. A single coppered vessel was recorded on the register of Lloyd's of London in 1777, a slaver sloop Hawke, 140 tons. This particular vessel impressed the Admiralty when it was inspected by Sandwich in 1775 at Sheerness after a 5-year voyage to India. By 1786, 275 vessels (around 3% of the merchant fleet) were coppered. By 1816, this had risen to 18% of British merchant ships. Copper sheets were exported to India for use on ships built there. In the late 18th and early 19th century, around 30% of Indian ships were coppered.

Merchant ship owners were attracted by the savings made possible by copper sheathing, despite the initial outlay. As the coppering was expensive, only the better owners tended to invest in the method, and as a result the use of copper sheathing tended to indicate a well-found and maintained ship, which led to Lloyd's of London charging lower insurance premiums, as the vessels were better risks. From this stems the phrase "copper-bottomed" as an indication of quality.

Coppering was more commonly used on merchant ships sailing in warm waters. Ships sailing in colder, northern waters often continued to use replaceable, wooden sheathing planks. Wood-boring organisms were less of a problem for these vessels and they were often routinely careened – an operation that could cause considerable damage to expensive coppering. Coppering was widely used on slave ships. After the Abolition of the Slave Trade Act became British law in 1807, the slave trade became illegal so slavers valued fast ships that were more likely to evade patrolling Royal Navy vessels intent on capturing them.

== Humphry Davy's experiments with copper sheathing ==
In the late 18th to early 19th century, Sir Humphry Davy performed many experiments to determine how to lessen the corrosion that the seawater caused on unprotected copper sheathing. To this end he had various thicknesses of copper submerged on the shore and then measured how much the sea water had degraded each one. Sheets of different metals remained in the seawater for four months and then were examined. Two harbour ships were also used in this test, one with an additional zinc band, the other with an iron one. Davy observed, that while the zinc and iron themselves became covered in carbonate that allowed weeds, plant life and insects to attach themselves to the metal, the copper sheets that were connected to cast iron or zinc parts were free of any attached life forms or discoloration. Unprotected copper would quickly go from a reddish color to a greenish color of corrosion. When the other metals were mixed with copper in ratios from 1:40 to 1:150, there was no visible sign of corrosion and minimal weight loss. When the ratio was changed to 1:200 and 1:400, there was significant corrosion and weight loss. Davy therefore advocated cast iron for protecting copper, since it was the cheapest to manufacture, and in his observations malleable iron and zinc seemed to wear down faster.

== Other uses ==
The term copper-bottomed continues to be used to describe a venture, plan or investment that is safe and is certain to be successful. The related copper-fastened (and verb form copperfasten) is used similarly, though with the nuance of "secured, unambiguous", rather than "trustworthy, reliable".

== See also ==
- Careening
- Hull (watercraft)
- Nelson Chequer

== General and cited references ==
- Beaglehole, J. C. (1966). The Exploration of the Pacific. Adam & Charles Black. OCLC 422331302.
- Lavery, Brian (1992). "Ships Fittings". In Gardiner, Robert (ed.). The Line of Battle: The Sailing Warship 1650–1840. Conway's History of the Ship. Conway Maritime Press. pp. 137–145. ISBN 0-85177-954-9.
- Lavery, Brian (1987). The Arming and Fitting of English Ships of War 1600-1815. Conway Maritime. ISBN 0-85177-451-2.
- McCarthy, Mike (2005). Ships' Fastenings: From Sewn Boat to Steamship. Texas A&M University Press. ISBN 1585444510.
- McKee, Alexander (1972). "Traders and Privateers Across the Atlantic: 1492–1733". In Bass, George F. (ed.). A History of Seafaring Based on Underwater Archaeology. Thames & Hudson. ISBN 0500010773. OCLC 641632.
- Roger, Nicholas (2004). The Command of the Ocean: A Naval History of Britain, 1649–1815. Allen Lane. ISBN 0-7139-9411-8.
