= Invasion stripes =

Bands painted on Allied aircraft during Normandy Landings in World War II

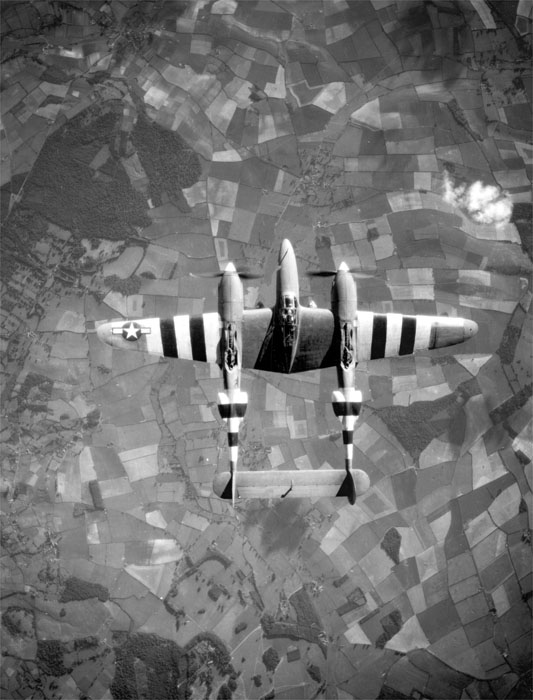
F-5 Lightning (P-38 Lightning reconnaissance version) participating in the Normandy campaign showing the D-Day invasion stripes

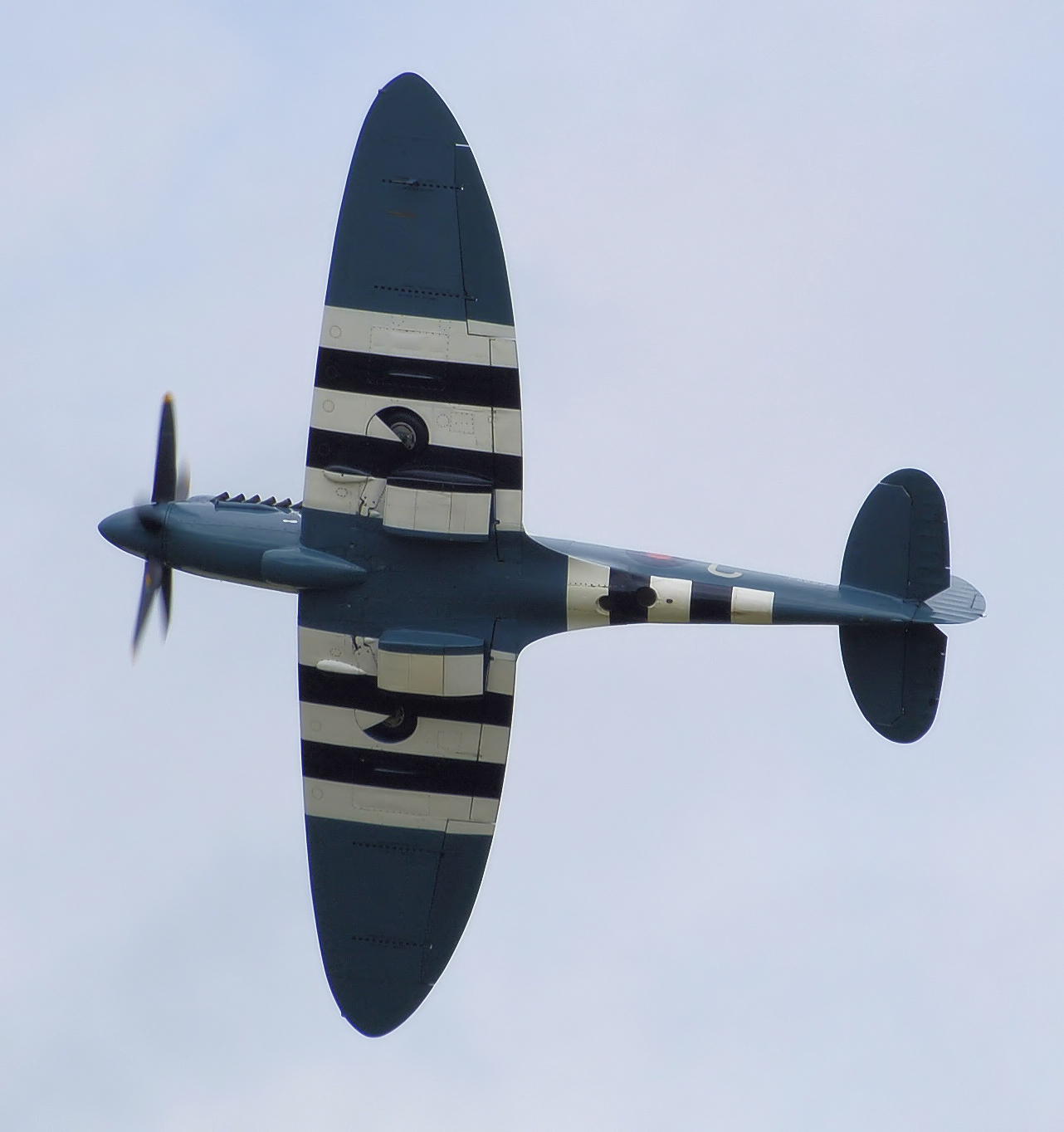
A Spitfire PR.Mk.XIX displayed at an air show in 2008 with the black and white invasion stripes

Invasion stripes were alternating black and white bands painted on the fuselages and wings of Allied aircraft during World War II to reduce the chance that they would be attacked by friendly forces during and after the Normandy Landings. Three white and two black bands were wrapped around the rear of a fuselage just in front of the empennage (tail) and from front to back around the upper and lower wing surfaces.

== Background ==
After a study concluded that the thousands of aircraft involved in the invasion (scheduled for June 6, 1944) would saturate and break down the IFF system, the marking scheme was approved on May 17, 1944, by Air Chief Marshal Sir Trafford Leigh-Mallory, commanding the Allied Expeditionary Air Force. A small-scale test exercise was flown over the OVERLORD invasion fleet on June 1, to familiarise the ships' crews with the markings, but for security reasons, orders to paint the stripes were not issued to the troop carrier units until June 3 and to the fighter and bomber units until June 4.

== Application ==
Stripes were applied to fighters, photo-reconnaissance aircraft, troop carriers, twin-engined medium and light bombers, and some special duty aircraft. They were not painted on four-engined heavy bombers of the U.S. Eighth Air Force or RAF Bomber Command, as there was little chance of mistaken identity, the Luftwaffe having few such bombers (the Focke-Wulf Fw 200 Condor being the exception). The order affected all aircraft of the Allied Expeditionary Air Force, the Air Defence of Great Britain, gliders, and support aircraft such as Coastal Command air-sea rescue aircraft whose duties might entail their overflying Allied anti-aircraft defenses.

One month after D-Day, the stripes were ordered removed from planes' upper surfaces to make them more difficult to spot on the ground at forward bases in France. They were completely removed by the end of 1944 after the Allies achieved total air supremacy over France.

During Operation Dragoon, two wings of IX Troop Carrier Command were sent to Italy to reinforce troop carrier forces in the Mediterranean Theater of Operations. Invasion stripes were painted on the aircraft of the 51st Troop Carrier Wing, already stationed there, to provide uniform markings during the operation.

=== Marking description ===
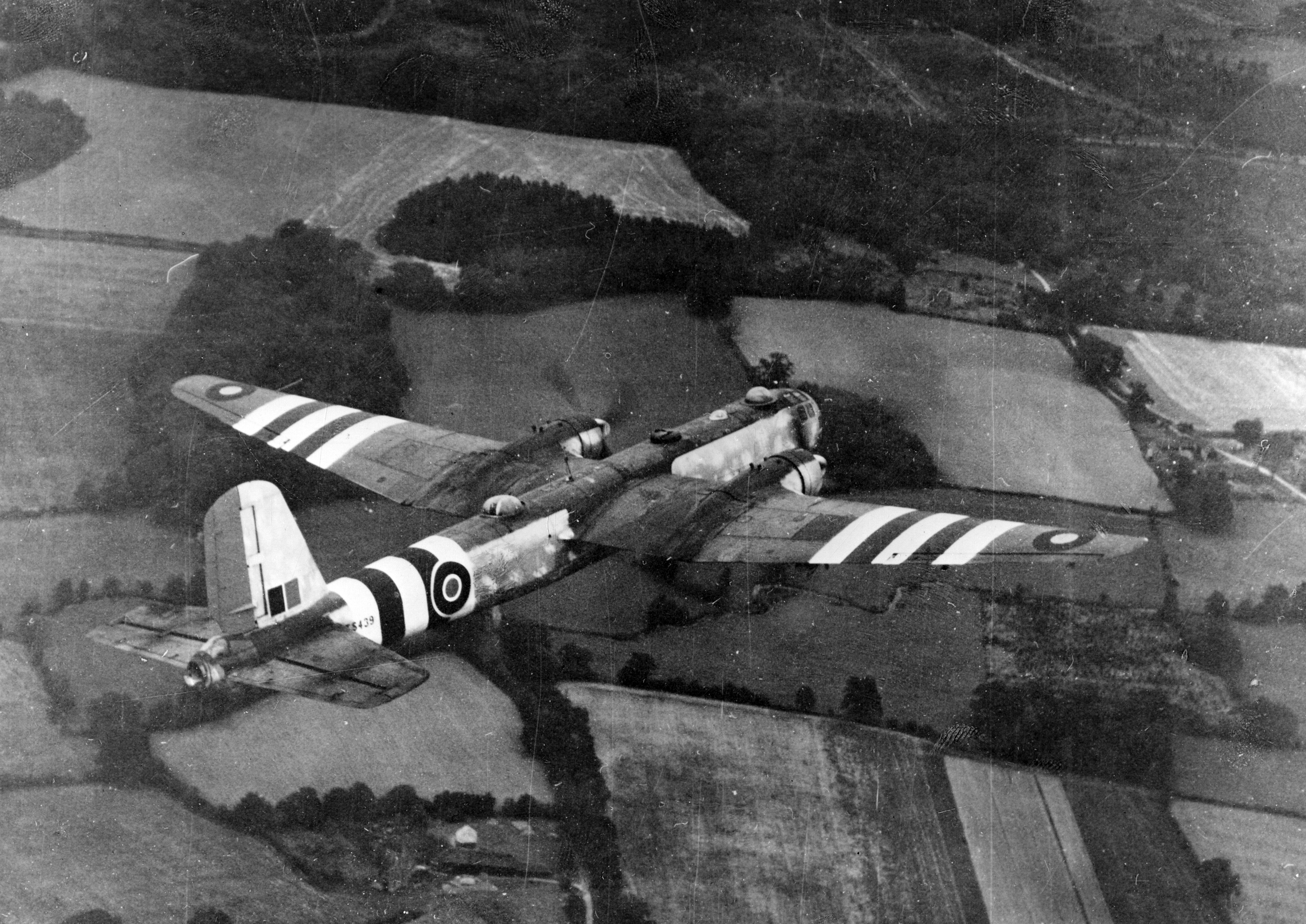
A British-captured He 177 German heavy bomber bearing Allied invasion stripes in 1945

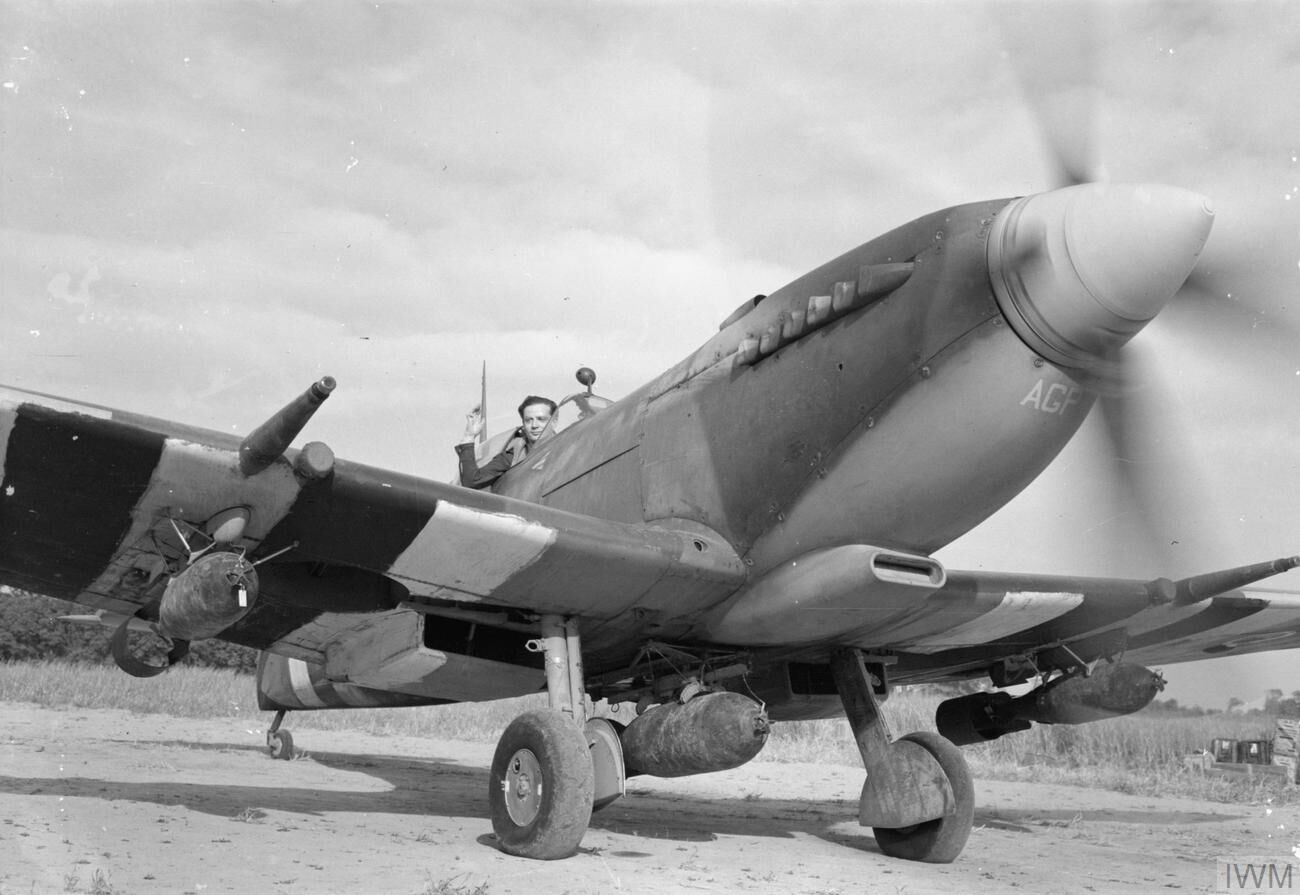
Geoffrey Page, commander of 125 Wing, about to take off on a ground-attack sortie in his Supermarine Spitfire (1944). The roughly-applied nature of the invasion stripes painted on his aircraft can be seen

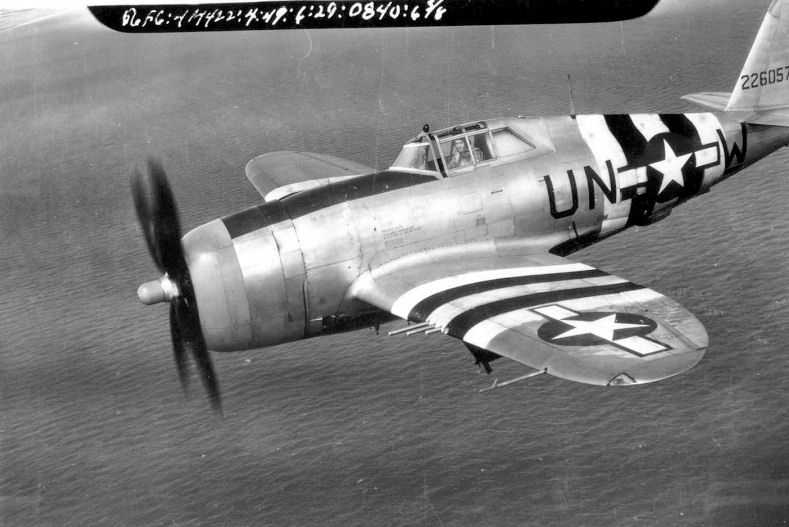
An early P-47D "razorback" Thunderbolt shows the "overlapping roundel" characteristic of their use on American aircraft's wings.

The stripes were five alternating black and white stripes. On single-engine aircraft each stripe was to be 18 inches (46 cm) wide, placed 6 inches (15 cm) inboard of the roundels on the wings and 18 inches (46 cm) forward of the leading edge of the tailplane on the fuselage. National markings and serial number were not to be obliterated. On twin-engine aircraft the stripes were 24 inches (61 cm) wide, placed 24 inches (61 cm) outboard of the engine nacelles on the wings, and 18 inches (46 cm) forward of the leading edge of the tailplane around the fuselage. However, American aircraft using the invasion stripes very commonly had some part of the added "bar" section of their post-1942 roundels overlapping the invasion strips on the wings.

In most cases the stripes were painted on by the ground crews; with only a few hours' notice, few of the stripes were "masked". As a result, depending on the abilities of the "erks" (RAF nickname for ground crew), the stripes were often far from neat and tidy.

== See also ==
- Identification friend or foe
- Combat Identification Panel
- Nelson Chequer, early 19th-century identification pattern
- United Nations Honour Flag
- Z (military symbol) and cossack crosses, symbols serving a similar purpose by belligerents during the Russian invasion of Ukraine
