= Actifsource =

- Developer(s): Actifsource AG
- Stable release: 11.5.0 / April 26, 2024; 10 months ago
- Written in: Java
- Available in: English
- Type: Model-driven engineering
- License: proprietary
- Website: http://www.actifsource.com

Actifsource is a domain-specific modeling workbench. It is realized as plug-in for the software development environment Eclipse. Actifsource supports the creation of multiple domain models which can be linked together. It comes with a UML-like graphical editor to create domain-specific languages and a general graphical editor to edit structures in the created languages. It supports code generation using user-defined generic code templates which are directly linked to the domain models. Code generation is integrated into Eclipse's incremental build process.

== Interoperability ==
Actifsource can use models from other modelling tools by importing and exporting the ecore format which is defined by the Eclipse Modeling Framework.

== Licensing policy ==
There are two versions of actifsource available: The free community edition which can be used freely for non-commercial projects and the enterprise edition which contains additional features. The enterprise edition comes with customer support and maintenance for a limited period of time. This package allows the customers to upgrade to new versions and maintenance releases during their support period.

== See also ==
- Model-driven engineering
- Domain-specific modeling
- CIP-Tool
