= Combat Identification Panel =

Military device to mark friendly vehicles

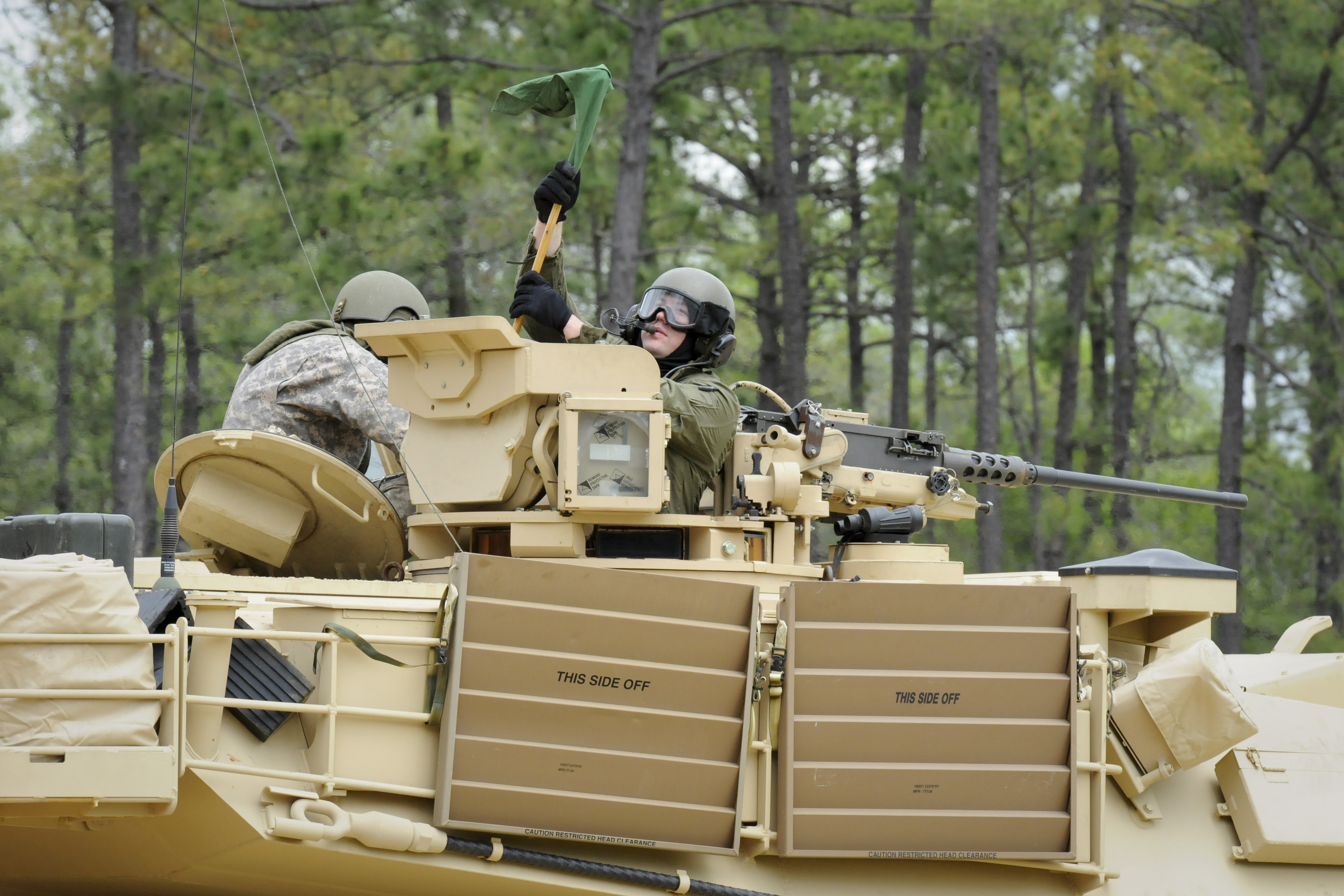
A pair of CIPs mounted on the side of an M1A1 Abrams' turret

The Combat Identification Panel (CIP), also known as a Coalition Identification Panel, is an Identification friend or foe device mounted on military ground vehicles used by United States Armed Forces' United States Army with United States Marine Corps and its allies to distinguish them from the enemy during battle.

== History ==
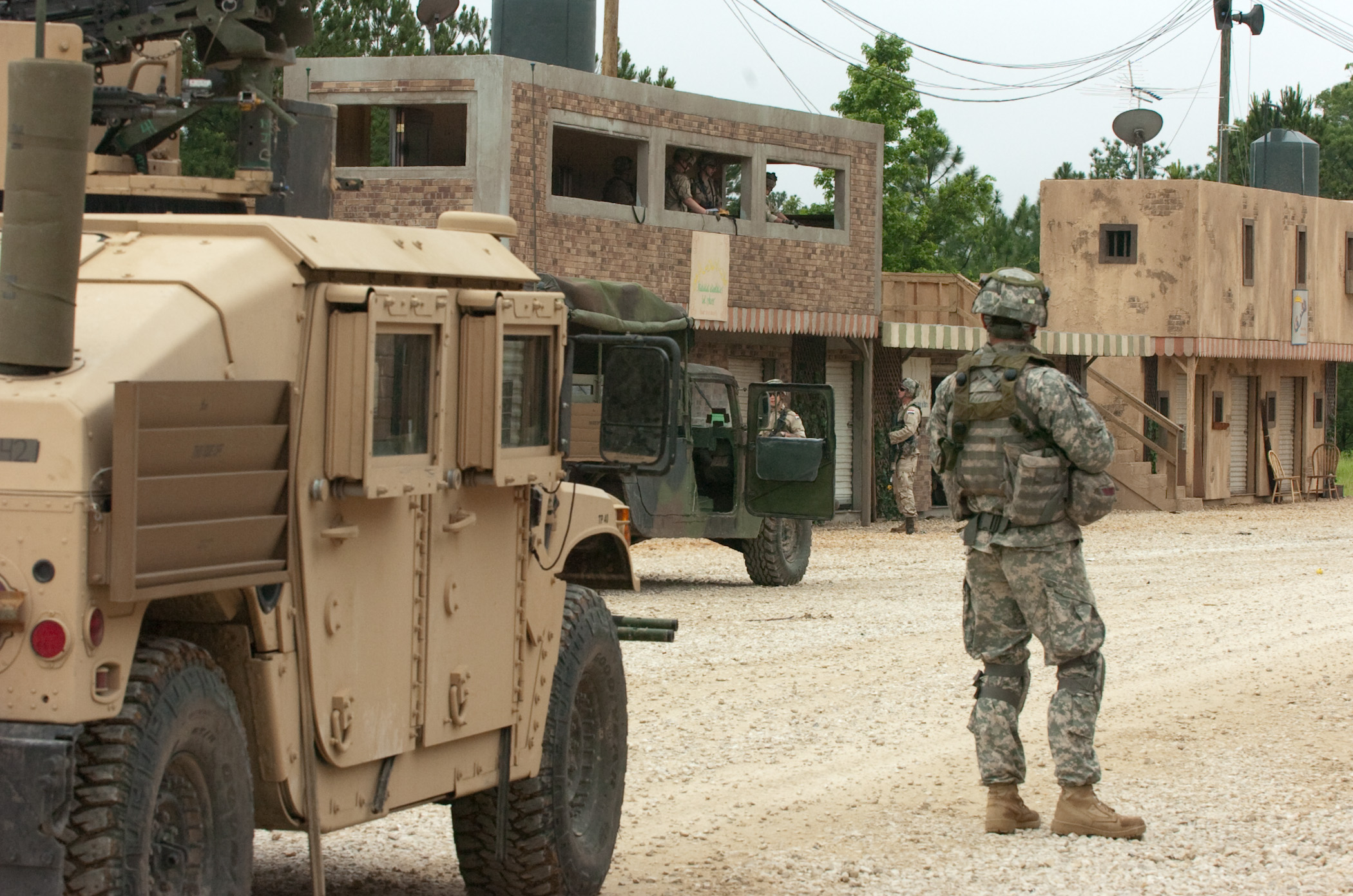
The CIP is the large square panel mounted directly above the rear axle of the nearest Humvee

Combat Identification Panels were developed after the Persian Gulf War to reduce friendly fire incidents among allied ground forces. These panels are designed to produce a distinct and easily identifiable infrared signature when seen through thermal imaging systems. Originally created as a hasty expediency, the use of low-thermal-emissivity tape and physical separation from the body of the vehicle meant that the panel would appear as a contrasting dark (i.e. cooler) area through thermal viewers in white hot mode.

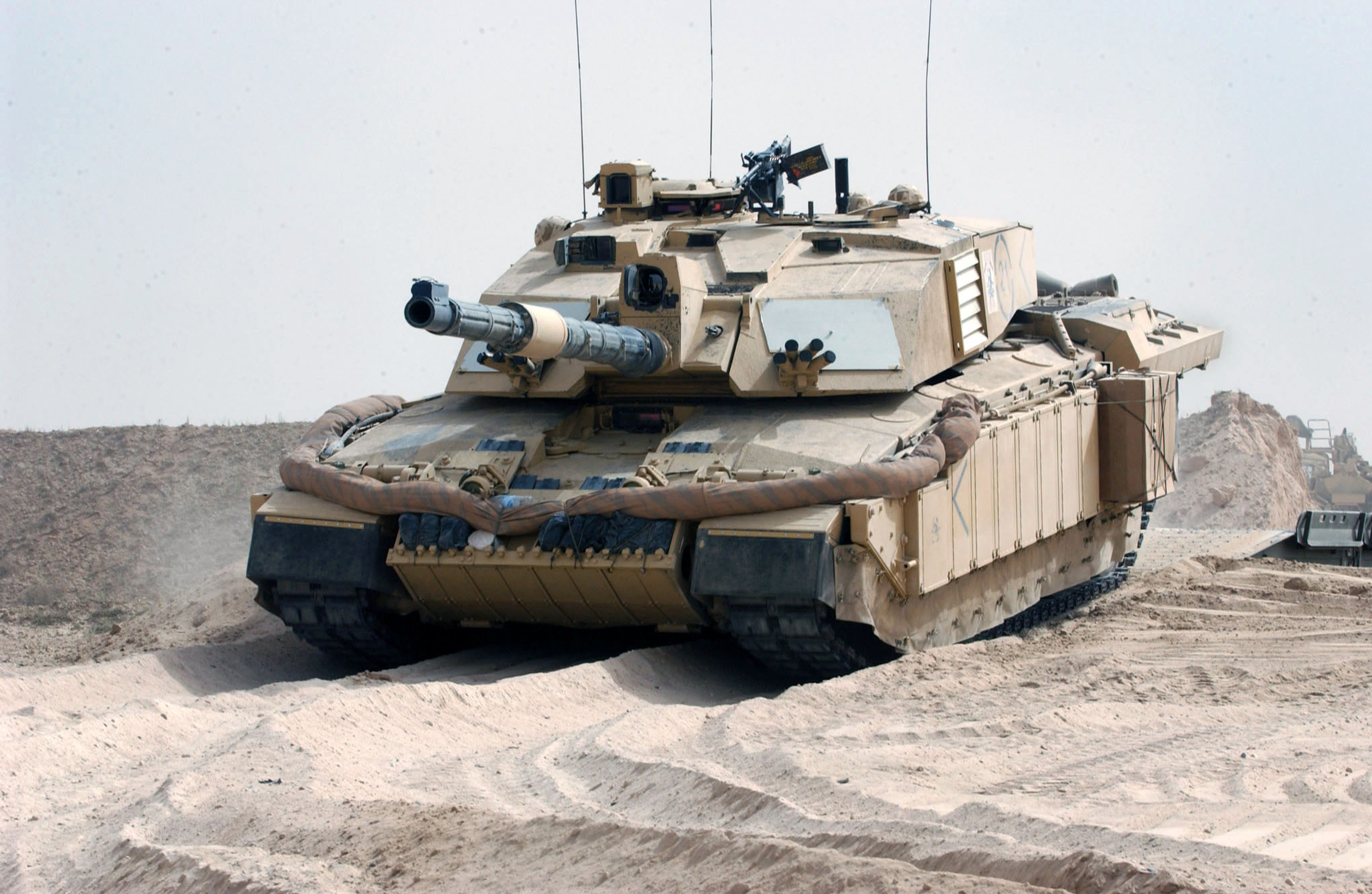
A British Army Challenger 2 with a combat identification panel mounted on the side of the turret

CIPs first saw widespread use in the Iraq War where nearly all coalition vehicles were equipped with these devices, usually mounted on the sides and rear of the body and/or turret. Some were even mounted on the driver and front passenger doors of Humvees with a special cutout so the door handle could still be accessed through the panel, as well as on the hood between the windshield and the top grille.

== See also ==
- Clapboard, the "overlapping" architectural element which it resembles
- Invasion stripes
- Tactical recognition flash
