= Certified IRB Professional =

The Certified IRB Professional (CIP) program is a certification initiative in the United States for individuals administering and overseeing the daily activities of institutional review boards (IRBs). IRBs are committees that are charged with determining if a research project conforms to ethical principles and federal regulations that protect the rights and welfare of human research subjects. The CIP program was developed by Public Responsibility in Medicine and Research (PRIM&R) to promote standards for professional knowledge and to support adherence to regulatory requirements, best practices, and ethical standards in the conduct of research. At present, there are more than 2,500 individuals who have attained their certification and have been authorized to use the CIP designation.

== Background ==
Created in 1999, the CIP program is a result of many years of discussions and planning by organizational members and leaders. It is endorsed by federal regulatory officials, professional associations, many national advisory bodies and IRB professionals who are committed to improving the quality of human research protection programs.

The CIP program is overseen by the Council for Certification of IRB Professionals (CCIP), which is composed of individuals representing diverse IRBs (social science, behavioral, biomedical, institutional, independent, etc.) across the United States.

== Eligibility for certification ==
The CIP program is for individuals whose primary job responsibilities include substantial participation in overseeing, administering or performing the daily activities of an institutional review board (IRB) as part of a human research protection program (HRPP).

In addition to submitting an application for the certification exam and paying the required fee, CIP applicants must meet either of the following criteria:

- A bachelor's degree plus two years of relevant human research protection program (HRPP) experience, completed on or before the first day of the applicant's chosen testing period, within the past seven years; or
- Three years of relevant HRPP experience, completed on or before the first day of the applicant's chosen testing period, within the past seven years; or
- Currently certified as a CIP.

The CIP Handbook states that "relevant HRPP Experience" requires substantial and ongoing performance within the last seven years of IRB administrative functions or duties relevant to an IRB Office within a HRPP, which demonstrates a commitment to human subject protection.

== Certification process and the CIP Examination ==
Eligible candidates earn their CIP credential by passing the CIP examination. The exam was developed by the CCIP with substantial input from HRPP/IRB professionals, and is administered under contract by the Professional Testing Corporation (PTC) twice a year at computerized testing centers across US and Canada and at specially arranged test locations that have included international locations.

The CIP exam consists of a maximum of 250 objective, multiple-choice questions and takes four hours to complete. The examination covers:

- Foundations and Concepts of IRB practice
- Organizational and Personnel Knowledge
- IRB Functions and Operations
- Records and reports

Individuals who earn passing grades on their exams become qualified CIPs. Certification is valid for three years, and can always be renewed via re-examination or can be renewed with continuing education credits twice in a nine-year period.
