= Nelson Chequer =

Colour scheme adopted by vessels of the British Royal Navy

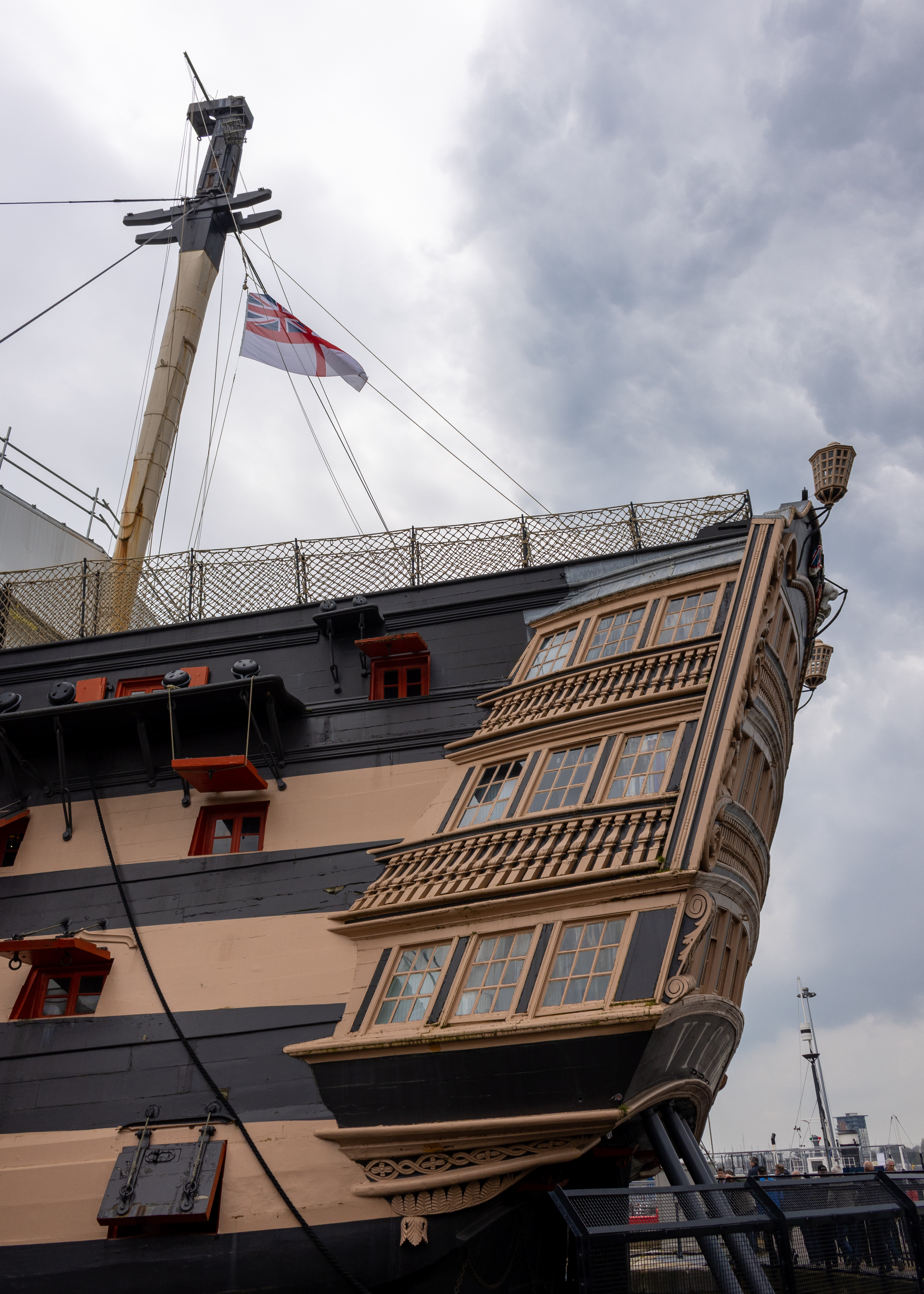
Stern of HMS Victory, Portsmouth painted in Nelson Chequer

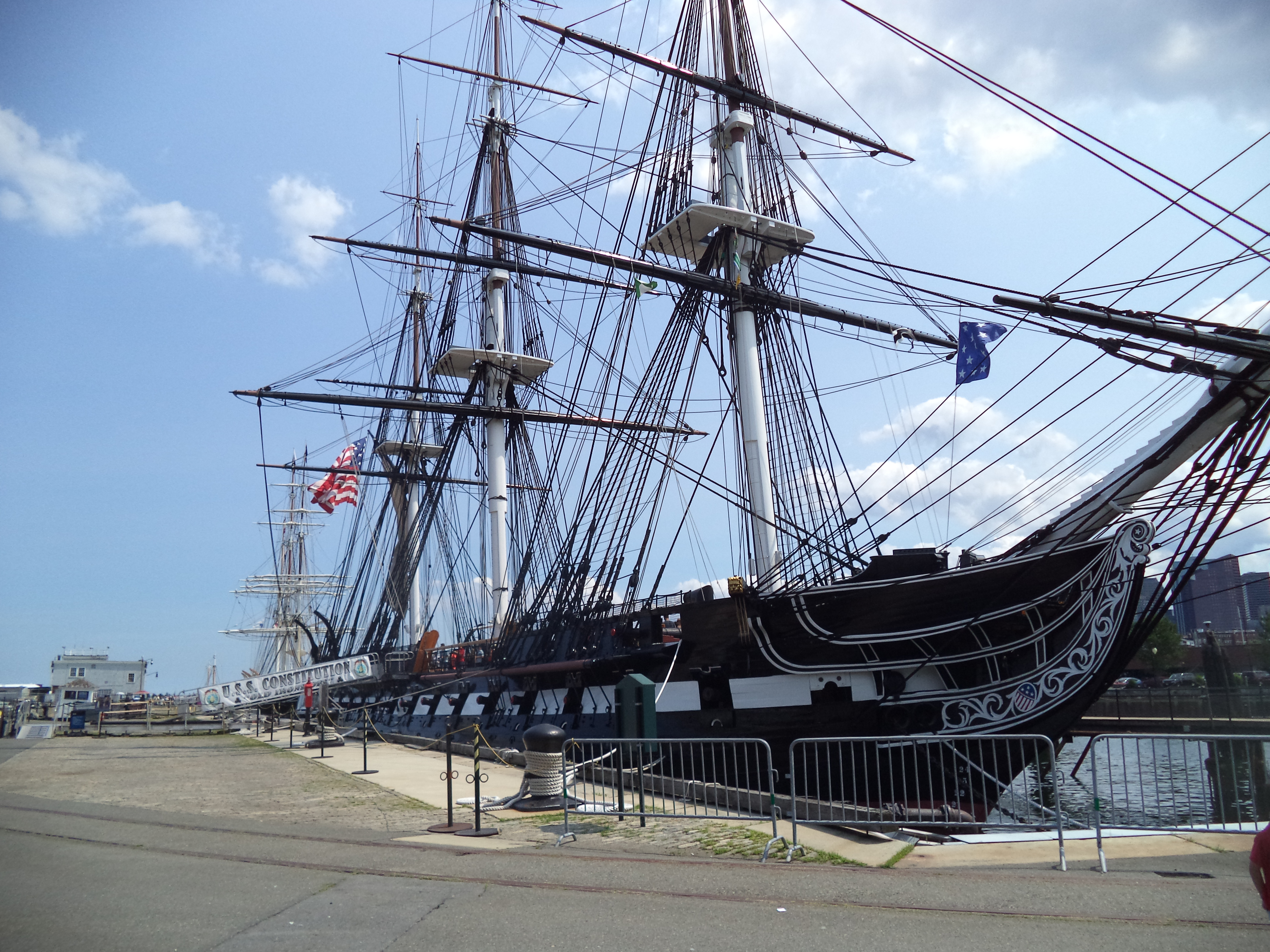
USS Constitution, painted in black and white

The Nelson Chequer was a colour scheme adopted by vessels of the Royal Navy, modelled on that used by Admiral Horatio Nelson in battle. It consisted of bands of black and yellow paint along the sides of the hull, broken up by black gunports.

== History ==
In the 18th and 19th centuries, vessels of all nations were painted in a variety of colours. Captains were allowed great latitude in the way they painted their vessels, as it aided identification in battle.

Periodically the Royal Navy sought a uniform colour scheme; In 1715, an Admiralty order decreed the use of yellow and black, and a uniform colour within. However, this was generally ignored. Again in 1780 the Admiralty then issued a further order allowing captains to paint in yellow or black.

Nelson favoured yellow, with black bands, he also had the underside of his gunports painted black. This meant that when the ports were closed the hull would appear striped, and when opened (ready for action) the hull would appear chequered. No chequering signalled "intent" over distance, which was necessary when sailing into fortified friendly harbours.

Nelson, apparently, used the same style for all vessels under his command. In his own words, it was done "to be distinguished with greater certainty in case of falling in with an enemy". After the Battle of Trafalgar (1805) the colour scheme became popular, and most major vessels in the Royal Navy sported this pattern, though it was not mandatory and some captains changed it. The Nelson Chequer fell into general disuse after 1815, when the yellow hue was superseded by white.

Nelson's flagship, HMS Victory remains painted with these colours, with the yellow stripes showing along the level of the gunports in Chatham while on an 1800 refit. In 2015, following an archeological study conducted with the aid of the University of London; the preserved HMS Victory was repainted with a pale yellow hue, which researchers believe to more closely match the colours worn by the ship during the Battle of Trafalgar. Researchers in the project identified paint types for other colours used on the ship based on price and availability in the era such as lead white, lamp black and various shades of yellow ochre, noting Nelson desired an even paler shade of yellow mixed with white but died before his request could be approved by the Admiralty who posthumously denied his request.

In spite of Nelson's desire to distinguish vessels by means of this unique colouring, it was also found among vessels of other navies, including some ships of the United States Navy. Towards the end of the Napoleonic Wars, a trend started to substitute white for yellow. This became popular with the United States Navy in particular and they used it during the War of 1812.

Vessels were of oiled wood except for the wale, the widest strake that rubbed other vessels, docks, etc. Wales were tarred or otherwise blackened; as they had been from Greek and Roman times. Topsides were maintained by scraping and re-applying oil. In time, even with new oil, planking darkened. This could provide strategic information about the ages of vessels in a fleet. In time ochre or buff paint began to replace linseed oil as the topside coating. This gave all ships a uniform appearance. Also, wales grew larger (more black). In the United States Navy the USS Constitution was black and buff when she was launched in 1798 and retained those colours until the early part of the War of 1812. Only late in that war, when white paint became more common and affordable, did she take on her current black and white look.

== See also ==
- Dazzle camouflage, twentieth century naval paint schemes
- Invasion stripes, World War II aircraft identification pattern
