= World Bank residual model =

Model to measure illicit financial flows

The World Bank residual model, in economics, refers to a widely used model by economists to measure illicit financial flows. The data sources for this analysis are the large-scale macroeconomic databases maintained by the International Monetary Fund and the World Bank.

In order to estimate illicit financial flows, this method measures a country's source of funds (inflows of capital) against its recorded use (outflows and/or expenditures of capital). Source of funds includes increases in net external indebtedness of the public sector and the net inflow of foreign direct investment. Use of funds includes the current account deficit that is financed by the capital account flows and additions to central bank reserves. An excess source of funds over the recorded use (or expenditures) points to a loss of unaccounted-for capital, and, as such, indicates illicit financial outflow.
