= Anti–money laundering =

Financial integrity policy framework

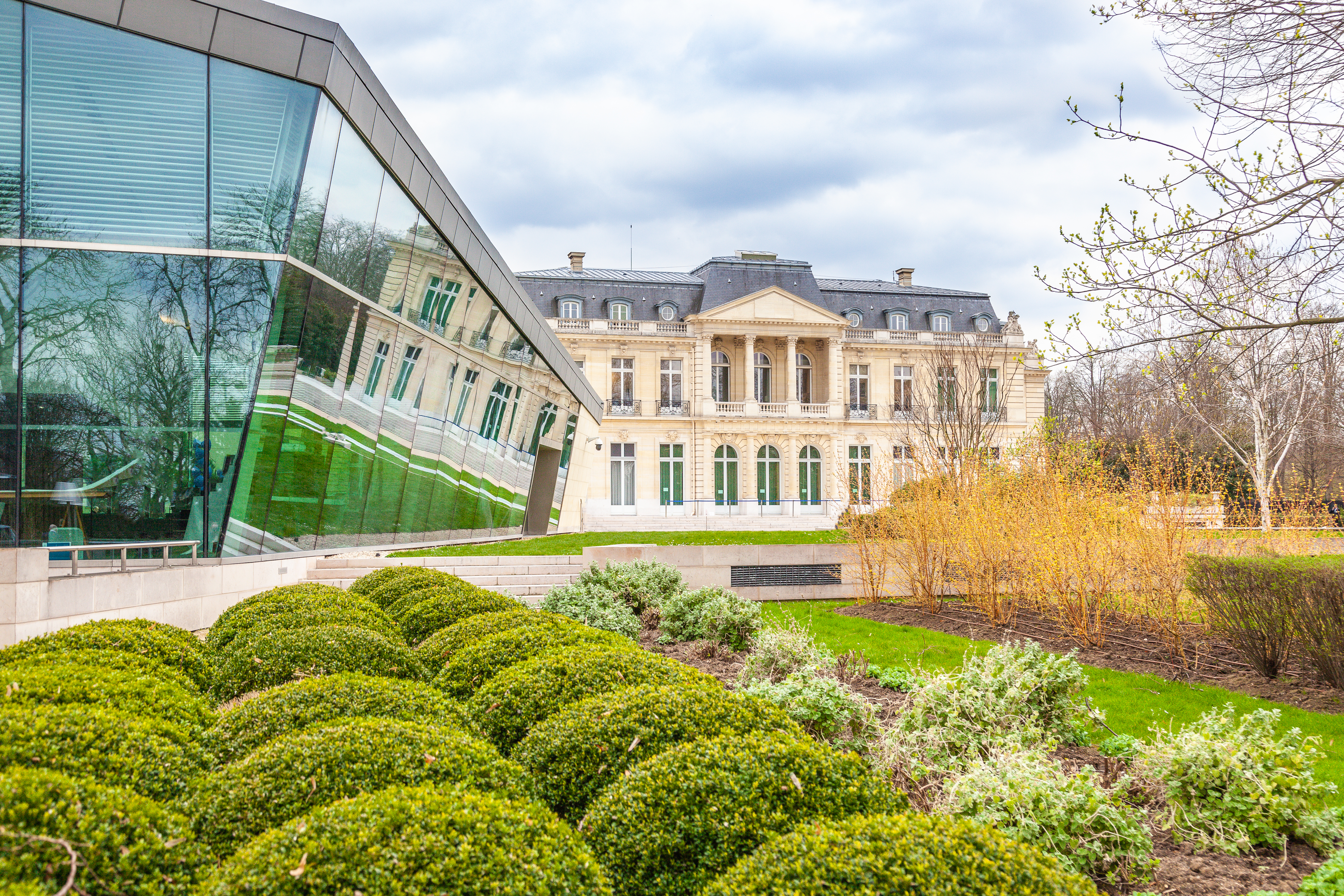
The OECD in Paris hosts the Financial Action Task Force, a global AML standard-setter.

Anti–money laundering (AML) refers to a set of laws, regulations and institutional practices designed to help financial institutions and other regulated entities prevent, detect, and report money laundering and related financial crime. (Anti–money laundering is sometimes paired with combating the financing of terrorism, using the initialism AML/CFT.) In addition to regulatory and supervisory arrangements intended to ensure that banks and other relevant firms implement AML controls and file suspicious transaction reports, the AML policy framework typically also involves financial intelligence units and relevant law enforcement agencies.

== Overview ==
Anti–money laundering guidelines came into prominence globally as a result of the formation of the Financial Action Task Force (FATF) and the promulgation of an international framework of anti–money laundering standards. These standards began to have more relevance in 2000 and 2001, after FATF began a process to publicly identify countries that were deficient in their anti–money laundering laws and international cooperation, a process colloquially known as "name and shame".

An effective AML program requires a jurisdiction to criminalise money laundering, giving the relevant regulators and police the powers and tools to investigate; be able to share information with other countries as appropriate; and require financial institutions to identify their customers, establish risk-based controls, keep records, and report suspicious activities.

Strict background checks, and a range of due diligence reviews, are necessary to try and prevent money launderers escaping detection by establishing complex ownership, transaction and company structures. Financial institutions and other regulated entities play a major role in seeking to achieve this but proper surveillance, and support from law enforcement, is required on the government side to fully exploit these efforts.

To help achieve these regulatory requirements and avoid reputational risks, financial institutions have invested in a range of forms of anti-money laundering software, including big data and artificial intelligence. Traditional anti–money laundering systems are falling behind against evolving threats, whilst new technologies help AML compliance officers to deal with: poor implementation, expanding regulation, administrative complexity, and false positives.

== Criminalization ==
The elements of the crime of money laundering are set forth in the United Nations Convention Against Illicit Traffic in Narcotic Drugs and Psychotropic Substances and Convention against Transnational Organized Crime. It is defined as knowingly engaging in a financial transaction with the proceeds of a crime for the purpose of concealing or disguising the illicit origin of the property from governments.

18 U.S.C. 1956 and 1957, the two most prominent U.S. Money Laundering crime statutes makes it criminal to "engage in a financial transaction involving the proceeds of certain crimes in order to conceal the nature, source, or ownership of proceeds they produced..." Money laundering is “the act of transferring illegally obtained money through legitimate people or accounts so that its original source cannot be traced."

== Organizations ==
Many countries are obligated by various international instruments and standards, such as the 1988 United Nations Convention Against Illicit Traffic in Narcotic Drugs and Psychotropic Substances, the 2000 Convention against Transnational Organized Crime, the 2003 United Nations Convention against Corruption, and the recommendations of the 1989 Financial Action Task Force on Money Laundering (FATF) to enact and enforce money laundering laws in an effort to stop narcotics trafficking, international organized crime, and corruption. Mexico, which has faced a significant increase in violent crime, established anti–money laundering controls in 2013 to curb the underlying crime issue.

Formed in 1989 by the G7 countries, the Financial Action Task Force on Money Laundering (FATF) is an intergovernmental body whose purpose is to develop and promote an international response to combat money laundering. The FATF Secretariat is housed at the headquarters of the OECD in Paris. In October 2001, FATF expanded its mission to include combating the financing of terrorism. FATF is a policy-making body that brings together legal, financial, and law enforcement experts to achieve national legislation and regulatory AML and CFT reforms. As of 2014 its membership consists of 36 countries and territories and two regional organizations. FATF works in collaboration with a number of international bodies and organizations. These entities have observer status with FATF, which does not entitle them to vote, but permits them full participation in plenary sessions and working groups.

FATF has developed 40 recommendations on money laundering and 9 special recommendations regarding terrorist financing. FATF assesses each member country against these recommendations in published reports. Countries seen as not being sufficiently compliant with such recommendations are subjected to financial sanctions.

FATF's three primary functions with regard to money laundering are:

1. Monitoring members' progress in implementing anti–money laundering measures,
2. Reviewing and reporting on laundering trends, techniques, and countermeasures, and
3. Promoting the adoption and implementation of FATF anti–money laundering standards globally.

The FATF currently comprises 34 member jurisdictions and 2 regional organisations, representing most major financial centres in all parts of the globe.

The United Nations Office on Drugs and Crime maintains the International Money Laundering Information Network, a website that provides information and software for anti–money laundering data collection and analysis. The World Bank has a website that provides policy advice and best practices to governments and the private sector on anti–money laundering issues. The Basel AML Index is an independent annual ranking that assesses the risk of money laundering and terrorist financing around the world.

=== International institutions, associations, and coordinations ===
- Asia/Pacific Group on Money Laundering
- Moneyval, the Committee of Experts on the Evaluation of Anti–Money Laundering Measures and the Financing of Terrorism, a monitoring body of the Council of Europe
- Financial Action Task Force on Money Laundering
- Inter-Governmental Action Group against Money Laundering in West Africa
- Association of Certified Anti-Money Laundering Specialists

=== State offices, regulations ===
- Anti–money laundering office of the Philippines
- Anti-Money Laundering Office (Thailand)
- AMLCFT regulation in the United States
- US Anti–money laundering program (Patriot Act, Title III, Subtitle B Sec.352)
- Russian Federal Financial Monitoring Service ("Rosfinmonitoring")
- Australian Transaction Reports and Analysis Centre or AUSTRAC, Australian government agency, Australia's anti–money laundering and counter–terrorism financing regulator

== Role of financial institutions ==
Laws, regulations and guidelines designed to combat money laundering and terrorist financing place legally binding obligations on sectors exposed to the risk of money laundering or the financing of terrorism to monitor their customers and transactions, to report suspicious activities to governments, and to manage risks, including, where necessary, ceasing or refusing to provide financial services.

These sectors are described as "obliged entities" in the European Union, and "covered institutions" in the United States. Since the establishment of the Financial Action Task Force (FATF) the scope of AML/CFT legislation has expanded steadily beyond traditional financial institutions. In the European Union, the list of obligated entities, set out in the recent 2024 Regulation, includes accountants and auditors, crowdfunding services, estate agents, gambling services, investment migration operators, notaries and lawyers, professional football clubs and agents, tax advisors, trusts and persons storing or trading in high value goods.

Whilst banks operating in the same country generally have to follow the same anti–money laundering laws and regulations, financial institutions all structure their anti–money laundering efforts slightly differently. Today, most financial institutions globally, and many non-financial institutions, are required to identify and report transactions of a suspicious nature to the financial intelligence unit in the respective country. For example, a bank must verify a customer's identity and, if necessary, monitor transactions for suspicious activity. This process comes under "know your customer" measures, which means knowing the identity of the customer and understanding the kinds of transactions in which the customer is likely to engage. By knowing one's customers, financial institutions can often identify unusual or suspicious behaviour, termed anomalies, which may be an indication of money laundering. This process is known as Customer Due Diligence (CDD) and also encompasses on-going monitoring to identify and report suspicious transactions and, on a risk basis, to maintain and update customer information. In 2003, these obligations were expanded by the FATF in the Forty Recommendations report to include Enhanced Due Diligence (EDD) checks and monitoring for higher risk business relationships, customers and transactions. The 2024 EU AML Regulation provides an insight into the current scale of EDD obligations. EDD must be applied in certain specific situations, such as business relationships with Politically Exposed Persons, cross-border correspondent relationships crypto-asset service providers or business relationships with persons in third countries with strategic deficiencies in the national AML/CFT regimes. The Regulation also identifies risk factors that, if present, may require application to EDD. Factors include reputation, nature or behaviour of customers, complex ownership, customer domicile, presence of nominee shareholders, cash-intensive businesses, use of new technologies or transactions linked to oil, tobacco, arms, precious metals or stones.

Bank employees, such as tellers and customer account representatives, are trained in anti–money laundering and are instructed to report activities that they deem suspicious. Sectors subject to AML/CFT legislation are legally required to maintain internal processes capable of monitoring customers and transactions, meeting CDD and EDD obligations and identifying and reporting suspicious activities to relevant regulators and law enforcement. Financial institutions that fail to comply with these requirements face threats to their reputation and heavy fines, sometimes running into billions of dollars.

Additionally, anti–money laundering software filters customer data, classifies it according to level of suspicion, and inspects it for anomalies. Such anomalies include any sudden and substantial increase in funds, a large withdrawal, or moving money to a bank secrecy jurisdiction. Smaller transactions that meet certain criteria may also be flagged as suspicious. For example, structuring can lead to flagged transactions. The software also flags names on government "blacklists" and transactions that involve countries hostile to the host nation. Once the software has mined data and flagged suspect transactions, it alerts bank management, who must then determine whether to file a report with the government.

Another form of commonly used anti-money laundering software, adverse media screening tools, scan a wide range of media sources with the aim of identifying negative stories and information about current or potential customers. These tools alert financial institutions to potential reputational and money laundering risks and help demonstrate regulatory compliance. However, they have weaknesses, including the scale of false positives generated, difficulty in determining credibility and impartiality of sources and acceptance of unverified allegations or commentaries as factual. An emerging concern is that they are also vulnerable to exploitation by criminals, using digitally generated disinformation and false allegations to create false positives and to impose reputational and financial harm.

== Enforcement and compliance costs, and associated privacy concerns ==
The financial services industry has become more vocal about the rising costs of anti–money laundering regulation and the limited benefits that they claim it brings. One commentator wrote that "[w]ithout facts, [anti–money laundering] legislation has been driven on rhetoric, driving by ill-guided activism responding to the need to be "seen to be doing something" rather than by an objective understanding of its effects on predicate crime. The social panic approach is justified by the language used—we talk of the battle against terrorism or the war on drugs". The Economist magazine has become increasingly vocal in its criticism of such regulation, particularly with reference to countering terrorist financing, referring to it as a "costly failure", although it concedes that other efforts (like reducing identity and credit card fraud) may still be effective at combating money laundering.

Money laundering poses significant harms for societies and economies. Data from the United Nations Office on Drugs and Crime (UNODC) estimates that criminal proceeds amounting to 2-5% of the global GDP are being laundered per year. Money laundering facilitates a wide range of underlying crimes. In the European Union there are 22 categories of such crimes, including: arms trafficking; bribery; corruption; cybercrime; drug trafficking; environmental crime; extortion; counterfeiting; financing of terrorism; forgery; fraud; human trafficking; insider trading; racketeering; sexual exploitation; tax evasion; and theft. Government-linked economists have noted the significant negative effects of money laundering on economic development, including undermining domestic capital formation, depressing growth, and diverting capital away from development.

Many of the costs of combatting money laundering are borne by financial institutions, due to obligations imposed by AML/CFT legislation. These "compliance" costs are significant. The Economist estimated the annual costs of anti–money laundering efforts in Europe and North America at US$5 billion in 2003, an increase from US$700 million in 2000. In 2023, a study estimated that the global cost of compliance was over US$200 billion. Financial institutions also face significant financial and reputational risks if they fail to comply with the extensive substantive and process requirements of CDD and EDD. This has contributed to debanking. In the UK, more than 450,000 bank accounts were closed by financial institutions in 2024, primarily because of AML/CFT compliance.

Financial institutions close accounts or deny access to financial services to customers because of the costs and risks of complying with AML/CFT legislation. Specifically, the significant costs of KYC compliance checks, the importance of avoiding financial and reputational penalties for failing to meet AML/CFT process obligations, and the need to manage the potential reputational risks posed by certain categories of customer deemed to require EDD checks. For both existing and new customers, these costs of meeting AML/CFT obligations regularly outweigh the potential benefits for the financial institutions. Debanking affects commercial and personal users of financial institutions. A report by the FATF pointed out that access to financial services is essential for full participation in modern societies as well being a critical pre-condition for a well-functioning economy. If debanked, companies or individuals lose access to the financial system, making trade, investment, asset management and day-to-day activities difficult. The report noted that there had also been a growth in financial exclusion, due to debanking, amongst the poor, deprived groups, minorities, the elderly, the disabled and NPOs.

A further issue is the abuse by malign actors of KYC processes for criminal purposes. Fabricated reports, information or stories are disseminated across pay-to-play websites, provided by criminals as a service, and picked up by adverse media screening software, triggering KYC alerts or failures and, potentially, removal of banking services. This activity harms reputations and imposes financial damage, whilst the threat of such steps can act as a form of blackmail.

There is no precise measurement of the full extent of the complex economic and social costs of regulation, including debanking, balanced against the scale of harms associated with money laundering, and given the evaluation problems involved in assessing such an issue, it is unlikely that the effectiveness of terror finance and money laundering laws could be determined with any degree of accuracy. Because of the intrinsic uncertainties of the amount of money laundered, changes in the amount of money laundered, and the cost of anti–money laundering systems, it is almost impossible to tell which anti–money laundering systems work and which are more or less cost effective.

Besides economic and social costs to implement anti–money-laundering laws, improper attention to data protection practices may entail disproportionate costs to individual privacy rights. In June 2011, the data-protection advisory committee to the European Union issued a report on data protection issues related to the prevention of money laundering and terrorist financing, which identified numerous transgressions against the established legal framework on privacy and data protection. The report made recommendations on how to address money laundering and terrorist financing in ways that safeguard personal privacy rights and data protection laws. In the United States, groups such as the American Civil Liberties Union have expressed concern that money laundering rules require banks to report on their own customers, essentially conscripting private businesses "into agents of the surveillance state".

== Anti–money laundering measures by region ==
Many jurisdictions adopt a list of specific predicate crimes for money laundering prosecutions, while others criminalize the proceeds of any serious crimes.

=== Afghanistan ===
The Financial Transactions and Reports Analysis Center of Afghanistan (FinTRACA) was established as a Financial Intelligence Unit under the Anti Money Laundering and Proceeds of Crime Law passed by decree late in 2004. The main purpose of this law is to protect the integrity of the Afghan financial system and to gain compliance with international treaties and conventions. The Financial Intelligence Unit is a semi-independent body that is administratively housed within the Central Bank of Afghanistan (Da Afghanistan Bank). The main objective of FinTRACA is to deny the use of the Afghan financial system to those who obtained funds as the result of illegal activity, and to those who would use it to support terrorist activities.

To meet its objectives, the FinTRACA collects and analyzes information from a variety of sources. These sources include entities with legal obligations to submit reports to the FinTRACA when a suspicious activity is detected, as well as reports of cash transactions above a threshold amount specified by regulation. Also, FinTRACA has access to all related Afghan government information and databases. When the analysis of this information supports the supposition of illegal use of the financial system, the FinTRACA works closely with law enforcement to investigate and prosecute the illegal activity. FinTRACA also cooperates internationally in support of its own analyses and investigations and to support the analyses and investigations of foreign counterparts, to the extent allowed by law. Other functions include training of those entities with legal obligations to report information, development of laws and regulations to support national-level AML objectives, and international and regional cooperation in the development of AML typologies and countermeasures.

After the Taliban regained control of the country in August 2021, FinTRACA's access to international financial intelligence data was removed. As of April 2026, access has not been re-established.

=== Armenia ===
To ensure the existence of legal mechanisms necessary for the stability of Armenian economy, the government set up a Financial Monitoring Center (FMC). The Financial Monitoring Center of Armenia is a financial intelligence unit of an administrative type and is situated in the Central Bank of Armenia. The center proposed and adopted the Law of the Republic of Armenia on fight against Legalizing the Illegal Incomes and Financing of Terrorism. This Law is based on the FATF 40 Recommendations, model laws and best international practices. The law is intended to protect the rights, freedoms and legal interests of the citizens, society, and the state, as well as to ensure the existence of legal mechanisms necessary for the stability of economic system of the Republic of Armenia. The objectives of the Financial Monitoring Center are:

- Implement specific measures to detect and deter money laundering and the financing of terrorist activities and to facilitate the investigation and prosecution of money laundering and terrorist financing offences including: Mandatory report requirement of suspicious financial transaction, large electronic fund transfers, and all large cash transactions, establishment of record keeping and client identification requirements for financial service providers and other persons that engage in businesses, professions or activities that are susceptible to being used for money laundering and the financing of terrorist activities.
- Fulfill Armenia's commitments to participate in the global fight against money laundering and terrorist financing. Towards this end, a special agency called Interagency Task Force 4 was created, which is responsible for the continual effective and cooperative activity in the sphere of fraudulence connected with money laundering, credit cards as well as terrorist financing in Armenia.
- To respond to the threat posed by organized criminals and terrorists by providing law enforcement officials with the information they need to deprive criminals and terrorists of the proceeds of their criminal activities and funds to support terrorist activities, while ensuring that appropriate safeguards are put in place to protect privacy of persons with respect to personal information.

=== Australia ===
Australia has adopted a number of strategies to combat money laundering, which mirror those of a majority of western countries. The Australian Transaction Reports and Analysis Centre (AUSTRAC) is Australia's financial intelligence unit to combat money laundering and terrorism financing, which requires every provider of designated services in Australia to report to it suspicious cash or other transactions and other specific information. The Attorney-General's Department maintains a list of outlawed terror organisations. It is an offense to materially support or be supported by such organisations. It is an offence to open a bank account in Australia in a false name, and rigorous procedures must be followed when new bank accounts are opened.

The Anti–Money Laundering and Counter–Terrorism Financing Act 2006 (Cth) (AML/CTF Act) is the principal legislative instrument, although there are also offence provisions contained in Division 400 of the Criminal Code Act 1995 (Cth). Upon its introduction, it was intended that the AML/CTF Act would be further amended by a second tranche of reforms extending to designated non-financial businesses and professions (DNFBPs) including, inter alia, lawyers, accountants, jewellers and real estate agents; however, those further reforms have yet to be progressed.

The Proceeds of Crime Act 2002 (Cth) imposes criminal penalties on a person who engages in money laundering.

=== Balkans ===
The organized criminal groups in Albania had long been involved in several illicit activities, including drug trade, arms and human trafficking, kidnapping, murders and others. Such criminals were attracted to the United Arab Emirates to seek refuge and to launder their illegal wealth. The UAE lacked regulations to combat the issue of terror funding and money laundering. Consequently, it became a safe haven for criminals from Albania and other Balkan countries, who escaped justice and continued to carry out their illegal activities while living in the Emirates. For countries like Albania, the complications were greater, due to the lack of bilateral extradition treaty with the UAE. Authorities in Albania struggled and failed to get most of the criminals extradited from the Emirates. Usually, the Gulf nation doesn't refuse to extradite these criminals, but it used to extend the process to the point of their release.

=== Bangladesh ===
The first anti–money laundering legislation in Bangladesh was the Money Laundering Prevention Act, 2002. It was replaced by the Money Laundering Prevention Ordinance 2008. Subsequently, the ordinance was repealed by the Money Laundering Prevention Act, 2009. In 2012, government again replaced it with the Money Laundering Prevention Act, 2012

In terms of section 2, "Money Laundering means – (i) knowingly moving, converting, or transferring proceeds of crime or property involved in an offence for the following purposes:- (1) concealing or disguising the illicit nature, source, location, ownership or control of the proceeds of crime; or (2) assisting any person involved in the commission of the predicate offence to evade the legal consequences of such offence; (ii) smuggling money or property earned through legal or illegal means to a foreign country; (iii) knowingly transferring or remitting the proceeds of crime to a foreign country or remitting or bringing them into Bangladesh from a foreign country with the intention of hiding or disguising its illegal source; or (iv) concluding or attempting to conclude financial transactions in such a manner so as to reporting requirement under this Act may be avoided;(v) converting or moving or transferring property with the intention to instigate or assist for committing a predicate offence; (vi) acquiring, possessing or using any property, knowing that such property is the proceeds of a predicate offence; (vii) performing such activities so as to the illegal source of the proceeds of crime may be concealed or disguised; (viii) participating in, associating with, conspiring, attempting, abetting, instigate or counsel to commit any offences mentioned above."

To prevent these Illegal uses of money, the Bangladesh government has introduced the Money Laundering Prevention Act. The Act was last amended in the year 2009 and all the financial institutes are following this act. Till today there are 26 circulars issued by Bangladesh Bank under this act. To prevent money laundering, a banker must do the following:

- While opening a new account, the account opening form should be duly filled up by all the information of the customer.
- The KYC must be properly filled.
- The Transaction Profile (TP) is mandatory for a client to understand his/her transactions. If needed, the TP must be updated at the client's consent.
- All other necessary papers should be properly collected along with the National ID card.
- If any suspicious transaction is noticed, the Branch Anti Money Laundering Compliance Officer (BAMLCO) must be notified and accordingly the Suspicious Transaction Report (STR) must be filled out.
- The cash department should be aware of the transactions. It is required to report if suddenly a big amount of money is deposited in any account. Proper documents are required if any client does this type of transaction.
- Structuring, over/ under invoicing is another way to do money laundering. The foreign exchange department should look into this matter cautiously.
- If any account has a transaction over 1 million taka in a single day, it must be reported in a cash transaction report (CTR).
- All bank officials must go through all the 26 circulars and use them.

=== Canada ===
In 1991, the Proceeds of Crime (Money Laundering) Act was brought into force in Canada to give legal effect to the former FATF Forty Recommendations by establishing record keeping and client identification requirements in the financial sector to facilitate the investigation and prosecution of money laundering offences under the Criminal Code and the Controlled Drugs and Substances Act.

In 2000, the Proceeds of Crime (Money Laundering) Act was amended to expand the scope of its application and to establish a financial intelligence unit with national control over money laundering, namely FINTRAC.

In December 2001, the scope of the Proceeds of Crime (Money Laundering) Act was again expanded by amendments enacted under the Anti-Terrorism Act with the objective of deterring terrorist activity by cutting off sources and channels of funding used by terrorists in response to 9/11. The Proceeds of Crime (Money Laundering) Act was renamed the Proceeds of Crime (Money Laundering) and Terrorist Financing Act.

In December 2006, the Proceeds of Crime (Money Laundering) and Terrorist Financing Act was further amended, in part, in response to pressure from the FATF for Canada to tighten its money laundering and financing of terrorism legislation. The amendments expanded the client identification, record-keeping and reporting requirements for certain organizations and included new obligations to report attempted suspicious transactions and outgoing and incoming international electronic fund transfers, undertake risk assessments and implement written compliance procedures in respect of those risks.

The amendments also enabled greater money laundering and terrorist financial intelligence sharing among enforcement agencies.

In Canada, casinos, money service businesses, notaries, accountants, banks, securities brokers, life insurance agencies, real estate salespeople and dealers in precious metals and stones are subject to the reporting and record keeping obligations under the Proceeds of Crime (Money Laundering) and Terrorist Financing Act. However, in recent years, casinos and realtors have been embroiled in scandal for aiding and abetting money launderers, especially in Vancouver, which has come to be known as the "Vancouver Model". Some have speculated that approximately $1 Billion is laundered in Vancouver per year.

=== China ===
In 2024, China’s supreme court and chief prosecutor jointly issued the Interpretation of Several Issues Concerning the Application of Law in Handling Criminal Cases of Money Laundering (2024). In American and British English, this title would translate to Money Laundering Prosecution Guidelines, and they explain how Criminal Law act section 191 applies to money laundering proceeds from specific unlawful activities. The guidelines treat money laundering done for concealment of criminal proceeds as a section 191 criminal offense both when tied to the offender’s own unlawful activity and when tied to unlawful activity committed by others, and directs courts to assess whether a defendant met a knowledge or reason-to-know standard based on totality-of-the-circumstances factors. The guidelines also identify aggravating circumstances where at least 5,000,000 yuan is laundered with specified sentencing enhancements, sets mandatory minimum fine amounts of 10,000 yuan for sentences up to five years imprisonment or jail and 200,000 yuan for sentences of five to ten years, superseding prior guidance from 2009 money laundering adjudicative guidelines. It is regulated by the China Anti-Money Laundering Monitoring and Analysis Center

=== European Union ===
The fourth iteration of the EU's anti–money laundering directive (AMLD IV) was published on 5 June 2015, after clearing its last legislative stop at the European Parliament. This directive brought the EU's money laundering laws more in line with the US's, which is advantageous for financial institutions operating in both jurisdictions. The Fifth Money Laundering Directive (5MLD) came into force on 10 January 2020, addressing a number of weaknesses in the European Union's AML/CFT regime that came to light after the enactment of the Fourth Money Laundering Directive AMLD IV). The AMLD5 increased the scope of the EU's AML regulations. It decreased the threshold of customer identity verification for the prepaid card industry from EUR 250 to EUR 150. The customers who deposit or transfer funds more than EUR150 will be identified by the prepaid card issuing company. Lack of harmonization in AML requirements between the US and EU has complicated the compliance efforts of global institutions that are looking to standardize the Know Your Customer (KYC) component of their AML programs across key jurisdictions. AMLD IV promises to better align the AML regimes by adopting a more risk-based approach compared to its predecessor, AMLD III.

Certain components of the directive, however, go beyond current requirements in both the EU and US, imposing new implementation challenges on banks. For instance, more public officials are brought within the scope of the directive, and EU member states are required to establish new registries of "beneficial owners" (i.e., those who ultimately own or control each company) which will impact banks. AMLD IV became effective 25 June 2015.

On 24 January 2019, the European Commission sent official warnings to ten member states as part of a crackdown on lax application of money laundering regulations. The Commission sent Germany a letter of formal notice, the first step of the EU legal procedure against states. Belgium, Finland, France, Lithuania, and Portugal were sent reasoned opinions, the second step of the procedure which could lead to fines. A second round of reasoned opinions was sent to Bulgaria, Cyprus, Poland, and Slovakia. The ten countries have two months to respond or face court action. The commission had set a 26 June 2017 deadline for EU countries to apply new rules against money laundering and terrorist financing.

On 13 February 2019, the Commission added Saudi Arabia, Panama, Nigeria and other jurisdictions to a blacklist of nations that pose a threat because of lax controls on terrorism financing and money laundering. This is a more expansive list than that of FATF.

In addition, the European Commission has created a list of high-risk countries on money laundering and terrorism financing, including: Afghanistan, Iran, Iraq, North Korea, Syria, Uganda, Vanuatu and Yemen (since 20 September 2016), Trinidad and Tobago (since 14 February 2018), Pakistan (since 2 October 2018), The Bahamas, Barbados, Botswana, Cambodia, Ghana, Jamaica, Mauritius, Mongolia, Myanmar, Nicaragua, Panama and Zimbabwe (since 1 October 2020).

In 2024, the European Union established the Anti-Money Laundering Authority, an EU-level agency intended to centralize aspects of AML enforcement in the EU and foster better coordination among national financial intelligence units.

The 6th Anti-Money Laundering Directive must be incorporated into national law by July 10, 2027.

=== India ===
In 2002, the Parliament of India passed an act called the Prevention of Money Laundering Act, 2002. The main objectives of this act are to prevent money-laundering as well as to provide for confiscation of property either derived from or involved in, money-laundering.

Section 12 (1) describes the obligations that banks, other financial institutions, and intermediaries have to

(a) Maintain records that detail the nature and value of transactions, whether such transactions comprise a single transaction or a series of connected transactions, and where these transactions take place within a month.
(b) Furnish information on transactions referred to in clause (a) to the Director within the time prescribed, including records of the identity of all its clients.

Section 12 (2) prescribes that the records referred to in sub-section (1) as mentioned above, must be maintained for ten years after the transactions finished. It is handled by the Indian Income Tax Department.

The provisions of the Act are frequently reviewed and various amendments have been passed from time to time.

Most money laundering activities in India are through political parties, corporate companies and the share market. These are investigated by the Enforcement Directorate and Indian Income Tax Department. According to Government of India, out of the total tax arrears of ₹2,480 billion (US$26 billion) about ₹1,300 billion (US$14 billion) pertain to money laundering and securities scam cases.

Bank accountants must record all transactions over Rs. 1 million and maintain such records for 10 years. Banks must also make cash transaction reports (CTRs) and suspicious transaction reports over Rs. 1 million within 7 days of initial suspicion. They must submit their reports to the Enforcement Directorate and Income Tax Department.

=== Nigeria ===
To combat money laundering, the Economic and Financial Crimes Commission was established in 2003. This body works alongside the Central Bank of Nigeria and the National Drug Law Enforcement Agency, to investigate and prosecute, individuals charged with the crime. The Money laundering Act was also established in 2011. This act contains elaborate provisions on the legal and institutional framework to prevent money laundering. The act also established the Special Control Unit against Money Laundering, under the EFCC. This act made key changes to the repealed act, some of which are;

- Restrictions on cash payment transactions: Transactions exceeding N5 million for individuals and N10 million for corporate bodies are to be made through a banking system, and any attempt at breaking up these transactions must be reported.
- Enhanced KYC requirements for agents and politically exposed persons;

The act also states that all agents acting on behalf of customers must be fully identified and verified. It also established that the source of wealth of political persons must be investigated and identified.

- Preservation and reconstruction of transaction records: The MLA states that all transaction records must be stored for a minimum of five years, and should be preserved in a way that they can be readily accessible when in need.
- Pre-launch assessment of new technologies or products: From henceforth all new technologies must be assessed for money laundering and terrorism risks, and appropriate measures must be taken to manage and mitigate the risks.
- Establishment of the Special Control Unit against Money Laundering: The act established and statutorily backed this body to monitor and oversee the operations of non-financial institutions. And this body works under the EFCC.
- Financial transaction and reporting: All transactions exceeding N5 million for individuals and N10 million for corporate bodies, must be reported by all financial institutions to the Nigerian Financial Intelligence Unit.

Other measures have been taken by the government to prevent money laundering. In May 2022, President Muhammadu Buhari signed into law three bills. These bills are; Money laundering (Prevention and Prohibition bill), 2022, the Terrorism (Prevention and Prohibition bill) 2022, and the Proceeds of Crime (Recovery and Management) Bill, 2022. The Central Bank of Nigeria also listed Regulations to prevent Money laundering in Nigeria. The Apex bank stated that all transactions conducted through correspondent banking relationships shall be managed with a risk-based approach and Know Your Correspondent procedures, this is to ascertain whether the bank or financial institution is regulated by a money laundering prevention body. The correspondent is to take action to identify the customer. The CBN also released a guidance note named; Anti–money Laundering/combating the financing of terrorism (AML/CFT) for OFIs. The CBN Financial Policy and Regulation Director Chibuzo Efobi mentioned that the guidance note would enable the sub-sector to identify, assess and minimize the risks of terrorist financing and money laundering. He also said that this Guidance note would identify risk management procedures that would lessen the vulnerability of financial institutions to Money laundering schemes.

=== Latin America ===
In Latin America, money laundering is mainly linked to drug trafficking activities and to having connections with criminal activity, such as crimes that have to do with arms trafficking, human trafficking, extortion, blackmail, smuggling, and acts of corruption of people linked to governments, such as bribery, which are more common in Latin American countries. There is a relationship between corruption and money laundering in developing countries. The economic power of Latin America increases rapidly and without support, these fortunes being of illicit origin having the appearance of legally acquired profits. With regard to money laundering, the ultimate goal of the process is to integrate illicit capital into the general economy and transform it into licit goods and services.

The money laundering practice uses various channels to legalize everything achieved through illegal practices. As such, it has different techniques depending on the country where this illegal operation is going to be carried out:

- In Colombia, the laundering of billions of dollars, which come from drug trafficking, is carried out through imports of contraband from the parallel exchange market.
- In Central American countries such as Guatemala and Honduras, money laundering continues to increase in the absence of adequate legislation and regulations in these countries. Money laundering activities in Costa Rica have experienced substantial growth, especially using large-scale currency smuggling and investments of drug cartels in real estate, within the tourism sector. Furthermore, the Colon Free Zone in Panama, continues to be the area of operations for money laundering where cash is exchanged for products of different nature that are then put up for sale at prices below those of production for a return fast of the capital.
- In Mexico, the preferred techniques continue to be the smuggling of currency abroad, in addition to electronic transfers, bank drafts with Mexican banks and operations in the parallel exchange market.
- Money Laundering in the Caribbean countries continues to be a serious problem that seems to be very dangerous. Specifically, in Antigua, the Dominican Republic, Jamaica, Saint Vincent and the Grenadines. Citizens of the Dominican Republic who have been involved in money laundering in the United States, use companies that are dedicated to transferring funds sent to the Dominican Republic in amounts of less than $10,000 under the use of false names. Moreover, in Jamaica, multimillion-dollar asset laundering cases were discovered through telephone betting operations abroad. Thousands of suspicious transactions have been detected in French overseas territories. Free trade zones such as Aruba, meanwhile, remain the preferred areas for money laundering. The offshore banking centers, the secret bank accounts and the tourist complexes are the channels through which the launderers whiten the proceeds of the illicit money.

Casinos continue to attract organizations that deal with money laundering. Aruba and the Netherlands Antilles, the Cayman Islands, Colombia, Mexico, Panama and Venezuela are considered high priority countries in the region, due to the strategies used by the washers.

==== Economic impact in the region ====
The practice of money laundering, among other economic and financial crimes seeps into the economic and political structures of most developing countries therefore resulting to political instability and economic digression.

Money laundering is still a great concern for the financial services industry. About 50% of the money laundering incidents in Latin America were reported by organizations in the financial sector. According to PwC's 2014 global economic crime survey, in Latin America only 2.8% of respondents in Latin America claimed suffering Antitrust/Competition Law incidents, compared to 5.2% of respondents globally.

It has been shown that money laundering has an impact on the financial behavior and macroeconomic performance of the industrialized countries. In these countries the macroeconomic consequences of money laundering are transmitted through several channels. Thus, money laundering complicates the formulation of economic policies. It is assumed that the proceeds of criminal activities are laundered by means of the notes and coins in circulation of the monetary substitutes.

The laundering causes disproportionate changes in the relative prices of assets which implies that resources are allocated inefficiently; and, therefore may have negative implications for economic growth, apparently money laundering is associated with a lower economic growth.

The Office of National Drug Control Policy of the United States estimates that only in that country, sales of narcotic drugs represent about 57,000 million dollars annually and most of these transactions are made in cash.

=== Singapore ===
Singapore's legal framework for combating money laundering is contained in a patchwork of legal instruments, the main elements of which are:

- The Corruption, Drug Trafficking and Other Serious Crimes (Confiscation of Benefits) Act (CDSA). This statute criminalises money laundering and imposes the requirement for persons to file suspicious transaction reports (STRs) and make a disclosure whenever physical currency or goods exceeding S$20,000 are carried into or out of Singapore.
- The Mutual Assistance in Criminal Matters Act (MACMA). This statute sets out the framework for mutual legal assistance in criminal matters.
- Legal instruments issued by regulatory agencies (such as the Monetary Authority of Singapore (MAS), in relation to financial institutions (FIs)) imposing requirements to conduct customer due diligence (CDD).

The term 'money laundering' is not used as such within the CDSA. Part VI of the CDSA criminalises the laundering of proceeds generated by criminal conduct and drug tracking via the following offences:

- The assistance of another person in retaining, controlling or using the benefits of drug dealing or criminal conduct under an arrangement (whether by concealment, removal from jurisdiction, transfer to nominees or otherwise) [section 43(1)/44(1)].
- The concealment, conversion, transfer or removal from the jurisdiction, or the acquisition, possession or use of benefits of drug dealing or criminal conduct [section 46(1)/47(1)].
- The concealment, conversion, transfer or removal from the jurisdiction of another person's benefits of drug dealing or criminal conduct [section 46(2)/47(2)].
- The acquirement, possession or use of another person's benefits of drug dealing or criminal conduct [section 46(3)/47(3)].

=== South Africa ===
In South Africa, the Financial Intelligence Centre Act (2001) and subsequent amendments have added responsibilities to the Financial Intelligence Centre (FIC) to combat money laundering.

=== United Arab Emirates ===
The United Arab Emirates has long been known as a hub of illicit financial flows and corruption. A large number business, real estate and financial transactions of the country majorly involve some sort of illegal activity. Moreover, several corrupt and criminal actors from across the world operate through or from the Emirates, including European money launderers, Nigerian kleptocrats, East African gold smugglers, Afghan warlords and others. Even the royal family members of the UAE are often known to be associated with certain cases of offshore holdings. However, in 2022, the UAE fell into a risk of being named in the Financial Action Task Force (FATF) "grey list". The list defines nations determined to have "strategic deficiencies" in combating money laundering and terrorist financing. On 4 March 2022, FATF placed the UAE in its 'grey' list of countries that are subject to increased monitoring. In April 2020, the Emirates had been warned of its money laundering activities, where FATF called the UAE's limited prosecutions on the issue a "concern". In November 2021, the group received a report from the Emirates, which did not reach much of the thresholds required for avoid the grey list. A report in June 2023 revealed that the Western countries, including Germany, Italy, Greece and the U.S., had been pushing FATF to remove the UAE from its grey list on money laundering, despite the Emirates’ image of being a haven for illicit flows. Members of FATF’s International Cooperation Review Group (ICRG) raised concerns that the UAE overpromised, but undelivered. However, ICRG’s representatives from the U.S. and European allies refused to address such concerns. A study by Swissaid revealed that 93% of undeclared African gold ended up in the UAE, making it the leading importer of smuggled gold from the continent. A co-author of the report, Marc Ummel said the FATF should reconsider the February 2024 removal of the Emirates from its “grey list”, as the country was illegally importing gold from Africa. He pointed out that the African gold is majorly linked to conflict, money laundering and human rights issues, leaving people extracting gold with nothing.

The Irish Department of Housing urged minister Darragh O'Brien to "ask in the strongest terms for the UAE to account for its relationship to Daniel Kinahan" a drug kingpin charged along with his brother, Christopher Kinahan in 2018 by the High Court of controlling and managing the daily drug operations in Ireland. The Kinahan brothers are sons of the Kinahan Cartel founder, Christy Kinahan Senior, who smuggled drugs and firearms into the UK, Ireland, and mainland Europe for long. For several years, the Kinahan leadership had been residing in Dubai, where Daniel denied his involvement in organized crime by defending himself as a ‘high-profile businessman in the professional boxing industry'. According to Panorama investigation, Daniel has operated in the boxing industry through MTK and simultaneously operated Europe's biggest money laundering, drug trafficking, and gangland executions networks from Dubai. A spokesperson for minister O'Brien said, "respect for human rights is a cornerstone of Ireland's foreign policy," when asked if the minister would raise the concerns regarding Daniel's presence and operations in Dubai on his visit in March 2022 for St Patrick's Day. The European Union placed the UAE on its money laundering blacklist, in December 2022. It implied that the EU considers the Emirates a high-risk nation that presents "strategic deficiencies in the anti–money laundering countering the financing of terrorism regimes". The move was taken amid the conflict against the Kinahan Organised Crime Group (KOCG), and was expected to push the authorities to take proactive measures against members of the Kinahan cartel.

In July 2025, the European Commission revised its list of high-risk jurisdictions for money laundering and terrorism financing, which excluded the UAE. The European Parliament voted in favor of the updated list, which was earlier opposed by the MEPs. The decision to remove the Emirates from the EU money laundering blacklist was criticized by Transparency International, which said the country’s reforms cannot be considered effective yet. The EU listing process also came into question for not allowing the Parliament to assess the countries individually. Lawmakers and civil society groups also condemned the delisting, stating that the decision is politically motivated and submits to geopolitical pressure.

In September 2025, several UAE-based individuals, companies and front companies were sanctioned by the US Treasury for supporting the IRGC and Iran's Ministry of Defense and Armed Forces Logistics (MODAFL). The sanctioned entities and individuals were part of an Iranian “shadow banking” network, exploiting international financial system and evading sanctions by laundering money through cryptocurrency and overseas front companies. The UAE-based firms that faced sanctions included Alpa Trading – FZCO, Alpa Investment L.L.C, and other front companies that facilitated illegal money flows. As a result of the sanctions, all property related to the designated individuals in the US is blocked, while the US citizens are prohibited from conducting transactions with them.

=== United Kingdom ===
Money laundering and terrorist funding legislation in the UK is governed by six Acts of primary legislation:-

- Terrorism Act 2000
- Anti-terrorism, Crime and Security Act 2001
- Proceeds of Crime Act 2002
- Serious Organised Crime and Police Act 2005
- Criminal Finances Act 2017
- Sanctions and Anti-Money Laundering Act 2018

Money Laundering Regulations are designed to protect the UK financial system, as well as preventing and detecting crime. If a business is covered by these regulations then controls are put in place to prevent it being used for money laundering.

The Proceeds of Crime Act 2002 contains the primary UK anti–money laundering legislation, including provisions requiring businesses within the "regulated sector" (banking, investment, money transmission, certain professions, etc.) to report to the authorities suspicions of money laundering by customers or others.

Money laundering is broadly defined in the UK. In effect any handling or involvement with any proceeds of any crime (or monies or assets representing the proceeds of crime) can be a money laundering offence. An offender's possession of the proceeds of his own crime falls within the UK definition of money laundering. The definition also covers activities within the traditional definition of money laundering, as a process that conceals or disguises the proceeds of crime to make them appear legitimate.

Unlike certain other jurisdictions (notably the US and much of Europe), UK money laundering offences are not limited to the proceeds of serious crimes, nor are there any monetary limits. Financial transactions need no money laundering design or purpose for UK laws to consider them a money laundering offence. A money laundering offence under UK legislation need not even involve money, since the money laundering legislation covers assets of any description. In consequence, any person who commits an acquisitive crime (i.e., one that produces some benefit in the form of money or an asset of any description) in the UK inevitably also commits a money laundering offence under UK legislation.

This applies also to a person who, by criminal conduct, evades a liability (such as a taxation liability)—which lawyers call "obtaining a pecuniary advantage"—as he is deemed thereby to obtain a sum of money equal in value to the liability evaded.

The principal money laundering offences carry a maximum penalty of 14 years' imprisonment.

Secondary regulation is provided by the Money Laundering Regulations 2003, which were replaced by the Money Laundering Regulations 2007. They are directly based on the EU Directives 91/308/EEC, 2001/97/EC and (through the 2007 regulations) 2005/60/EC. The regulations list a number of supervisory authorities who have a role in overseeing the financial activities of their members.

One consequence of the Act is that solicitors, accountants, tax advisers, and insolvency practitioners who suspect (as a consequence of information received in the course of their work) that their clients (or others) have engaged in tax evasion or other criminal conduct that produced a benefit, now must report their suspicions to the authorities (since these entail suspicions of money laundering). In most circumstances it would be an offence, "tipping-off", for the reporter to inform the subject of his report that a report has been made. These provisions do not however require disclosure to the authorities of information received by certain professionals in privileged circumstances or where the information is subject to legal professional privilege. Others that are subject to these regulations include financial institutions, credit institutions, estate agents (which includes chartered surveyors), trust and company service providers, high value dealers (who accept cash equivalent to €15,000 or more for goods sold), and casinos.

Professional guidance (which is submitted to and approved by the UK Treasury) is provided by industry groups including the Joint Money Laundering Steering Group, the Law Society. and the Consultative Committee of Accountancy Bodies (CCAB). However, there is no obligation on banking institutions to routinely report monetary deposits or transfers above a specified value. Instead reports must be made of all suspicious deposits or transfers, irrespective of their value.

The reporting obligations include reporting suspicious gains from conduct in other countries that would be criminal if it took place in the UK. Exceptions were later added for certain activities legal where they took place, such as bullfighting in Spain.

More than 200,000 reports of suspected money laundering are submitted annually to authorities in the UK (there were 240,582 reports in the year ended 30 September 2010. This was an increase from the 228,834 reports submitted in the previous year). Most of these reports are submitted by banks and similar financial institutions (there were 186,897 reports from the banking sector in the year ended 30 September 2010).

Although 5,108 different organisations submitted suspicious activity reports to the authorities in the year ended 30 September 2010, just four organisations submitted approximately half of all reports, and the top 20 reporting organisations accounted for three-quarters of all reports.

The offence of failing to report a suspicion of money laundering by another person carries a maximum penalty of five years' imprisonment.

The Criminal Finances Act 2017 introduced unexplained wealth orders, another tool to combat money laundering, whereby the owner of an asset greater than £50,000 may be required to show how the purchase was financed.

On 1 May 2018, the UK House of Commons, without opposition, passed the Sanctions and Anti–Money Laundering Bill, which will set out the UK government's intended approach to exceptions and licenses when the nation becomes responsible for implementing its own sanctions and will also require notorious overseas British territory tax havens such as the Cayman Islands and the British Virgin Islands to establish public registers of the beneficial ownership of firms in their jurisdictions by the end of 2020. The legislation was passed by the House of Lords on 21 May and received Royal Asset on 23 May. However, the Act's public register provision is facing legal challenges from local governments in the Cayman Islands and British Virgin Islands, who argue that it violates their Constitutional sovereignty.

Under the Proceeds of Crime Act goods that criminals cannot legally account for are seized and sold at auction to raise funds. This is usually carried out by authorised auction houses and often within the geographical areas of the criminals.

==== Bureaux de change ====
All UK Bureaux de change are registered with His Majesty's Revenue and Customs, which issues a trading licence for each location. Bureaux de change and money transmitters, such as Western Union outlets, in the UK fall within the "regulated sector" and are required to comply with the Money Laundering Regulations 2007. Checks can be carried out by HMRC on all Money Service Businesses.

==== London Bullion Market Association ====
In November 2020, the London Bullion Market Association wrote a letter to a number of countries with huge gold markets, including Dubai (United Arab Emirates), China, Singapore, South Africa, Russia, Japan, United States and others, laying out the standards regarding money laundering and other issues like where they sourced their gold. It also threatened that these countries could be blacklisted, if they failed to meet the regulatory standards. This was LBMA's first move to challenge the illegal or unethical production and trading of gold.

==== Ernst & Young Global Limited ====
A former partner of the UK-based accounting firm Ernst & Young, Amjad Rihan was ousted after he attempted to report the money laundering and gold smuggling efforts of Dubai-based firm Kaloti Jewellery International. Rihan had claimed that "Kaloti was knowingly dealing in gold bullion smuggled out of Morocco". However, after he reported the issue, the Dubai government body, DMCC, attempted to put unnecessary pressure on him and his firm. In 2021, Ernst & Young withdrew an eight-year-long legal fight against Rihan asking a compensation of $10.8 million from him.

=== United States ===
The approach in the United States to stop money laundering is usually broken into two areas: preventive (regulatory) measures, and prosecutorial measures. In the United States, whistleblowers can report money laundering activities to the Financial Crimes Enforcement Network (FinCEN) or the Securities and Exchange Commission (SEC) if the case also implicates a security.

==== Preventive ====
In an attempt to prevent dirty money from entering the U.S. financial system in the first place, the United States Congress passed a series of laws, starting in 1970, collectively known as the Bank Secrecy Act (BSA). These laws, contained in sections 5311 through 5332 of Title 31 of the United States Code, require financial institutions, which under the current definition include a broad array of entities, including banks, credit card companies, life insurers, money service businesses and broker-dealers in securities, to report certain transactions to the United States Department of the Treasury. Cash transactions in excess of a certain amount must be reported on a currency transaction report (CTR), identifying the individual making the transaction as well as the source of the cash. The law originally required all transactions of US$5,000 or more to be reported, but due to excessively high levels of reporting the threshold was raised to US$10,000. The U.S. is one of the few countries in the world to require reporting of all cash transactions over a certain limit, although certain businesses can be exempt from the requirement. Additionally, financial institutions must report transaction on a Suspicious Activity Report (SAR) that they deem "suspicious", defined as a knowing or suspecting that the funds come from illegal activity or disguise funds from illegal activity, that it is structured to evade BSA requirements or appears to serve no known business or apparent lawful purpose; or that the institution is being used to facilitate criminal activity. Attempts by customers to circumvent the BSA, generally by structuring cash deposits to amounts lower than US$10,000 by breaking them up and depositing them on different days or at different locations also violates the law.

The financial database created by these reports is administered by the U.S.'s Financial Intelligence Unit, called the Financial Crimes Enforcement Network (FinCEN), located in Vienna, Virginia. The reports are made available to U.S. criminal investigators, as well as other FIU's around the globe, and FinCEN conducts computer-assisted analyses of these reports to determine trends and refer investigations.

The BSA requires financial institutions to engage in customer due diligence, or KYC, which is sometimes known in parlance as know your customer. It includes obtaining satisfactory identification to assure that the account is in the customer's actual name and understanding the expected nature and source of the money that flows through the customer's accounts. Other customers, such as those with private banking accounts and those of foreign government officials, are subjected to enhanced due diligence because the law deems that those accounts are at a higher risk for money laundering. All accounts are subject to ongoing monitoring, in which internal bank software scrutinizes transactions and flags for manual inspection those that fall outside specific parameters. If a manual inspection reveals that the transaction is suspicious, the institution should file a Suspicious Activity Report.

The regulators of the industries involved are responsible to ensure that the financial institutions comply with the BSA. For example, the Federal Reserve and the Office of the Comptroller of the Currency regularly inspect banks, and may impose civil fines or refer matters for criminal prosecution for non-compliance. A number of banks have been fined and prosecuted for failure to comply with the BSA. Most famously, Riggs Bank, in Washington D.C., was prosecuted and functionally driven out of business as a result of its failure to apply proper money laundering controls, particularly as it related to foreign political figures.

In addition to the BSA, the U.S. imposes controls on the movement of currency across its borders, requiring individuals to report the transportation of cash in excess of US$10,000 on a form called Report of International Transportation of Currency or Monetary Instruments (known as a CMIR). Likewise, businesses, such as automobile dealerships, that receive cash in excess of US$10,000 must file a Form 8300 with the Internal Revenue Service, identifying the source of the cash.

On 1 September 2010, the Financial Crimes Enforcement Network issued an advisory on "informal value transfer systems" referencing United States v. Banki.

In the United States, there are perceived consequences of anti–money laundering (AML) regulations. These unintended consequences include FinCEN's publishing of a list of "risky businesses", which many believe unfairly targeted money service businesses. The publishing of this list and the subsequent fall-out, banks indiscriminately de-risking MSBs, is referred to as Operation Choke Point. The Financial Crimes Enforcement Network issued a Geographic Targeting Order to combat illegal money laundering in the United States. This means that title insurance companies in the U.S. are required to identify the natural persons behind companies that pay all cash in residential real estate purchases over a particular amount in certain U.S. cities.

The Corporate Transparency Act (CTA) is a significant piece of legislation in the United States aimed at combating money laundering and enhancing financial transparency. Enacted as part of the National Defense Authorization Act for Fiscal Year 2021, the CTA mandates that corporations, limited liability companies (LLCs), and similar entities disclose information about their beneficial owners to the Financial Crimes Enforcement Network (FinCEN). This requirement is designed to help authorities identify and track individuals who control or profit from these entities, thereby closing loopholes often exploited for illicit activities.

The CTA requires entities to file Beneficial Ownership Information (BOI) reports with FinCEN. These reports must include details such as the names, addresses, dates of birth, and identification numbers of the beneficial owners. By gathering this information, the CTA aims to create a comprehensive database that federal, state, and local law enforcement agencies can access to investigate and prevent financial crimes. The legislation reflects a broader international effort to enhance corporate transparency and ensure that entities cannot be used to hide illicit funds or conduct illegal activities anonymously.

==== Criminal sanctions ====
Money laundering has been criminalized in the United States since the Money Laundering Control Act of 1986. The law, contained at section 1956 of Title 18 of the United States Code, prohibits individuals from engaging in a financial transaction with proceeds that were generated from certain specific crimes, known as "specified unlawful activities" (SUAs). The law requires that an individual specifically intends to make the transaction to conceal the source, ownership or control of the funds. There is no minimum threshold of money and no requirement that the transaction succeeded in actually disguising the money. A "financial transaction" has been broadly defined, and need not involve a financial institution, or even a business. Merely passing money from one person to another, with the intent to disguise the source, ownership, location or control of the money, has been deemed a financial transaction under the law. The possession of money without either a financial transaction or an intent to conceal is not a crime in the United States. Besides money laundering, the law contained in section 1957 of Title 18 of the United States Code, prohibits spending more than US$10,000 derived from an SUA, regardless of whether the individual wishes to disguise it. It carries a lesser penalty than money laundering, and unlike the money laundering statute, requires that the money pass through a financial institution.

According to the records compiled by the United States Sentencing Commission, in 2009, the United States Department of Justice typically convicted a little over 81,000 people; of this, approximately 800 were convicted of money laundering as the primary or most serious charge. The Anti-Drug Abuse Act of 1988 expanded the definition of financial institution to include businesses such as car dealers and real estate closing personnel and required them to file reports on large currency transactions. It required verification of identity of those who purchase monetary instruments over $3,000. The Annunzio-Wylie Anti-Money Laundering Act of 1992 strengthened sanctions for BSA violations, required so called "Suspicious Activity Reports" and eliminated previously used "Criminal Referral Forms", required verification and recordkeeping for wire transfers and established the Bank Secrecy Act Advisory Group (BSAAG). The Money Laundering Suppression Act from 1994 required banking agencies to review and enhance training, develop anti–money laundering examination procedures, review and enhance procedures for referring cases to law enforcement agencies, streamline the currency transaction report exemption process, required each money services business (MSB) to be registered by an owner or controlling person, required every MSB to maintain a list of businesses authorized to act as agents in connection with the financial services offered by the MSB, made operating an unregistered MSB a federal crime, and recommended that states adopt uniform laws applicable to MSBs. The Money Laundering and Financial Crimes Strategy Act of 1998 required banking agencies to develop anti–money laundering training for examiners, required the Department of the Treasury and other agencies to develop a "National Money Laundering Strategy", created the "High Intensity Money Laundering and Related Financial Crime Area" (HIFCA) Task Forces to concentrate law enforcement efforts at the federal, state and local levels in zones where money laundering is prevalent. HIFCA zones may be defined geographically or can be created to address money laundering in an industry sector, a financial institution, or group of financial institutions.

The Intelligence Reform & Terrorism Prevention Act of 2004 amended the Bank Secrecy Act to require the Secretary of the Treasury to prescribe regulations requiring certain financial institutions to report cross-border electronic transmittals of funds, if the Secretary determines that reporting is "reasonably necessary" to prevent money laundering and financing of terrorism. In May 2025, the FBI ordered its agents to prioritize investigation of complex money laundering including "Chinese Money Laundering Organizations."

== Use of AML technology ==
=== Gaming and Gambling Industry ===
The gaming and gambling industry has increasingly adopted anti-money laundering (AML) technologies in response to evolving regulatory expectations and the growing complexity of digital transactions. Online casinos and gaming platforms often operate with virtual currencies, microtransactions, and peer-to-peer trading systems, which require enhanced oversight to ensure financial transparency.

To address these challenges, many operators have implemented advanced compliance measures such as Know Your Customer (KYC) procedures, real-time transaction monitoring, and AI-driven behavioral analytics. These technologies assist in identifying irregular activity, supporting regulatory compliance, and reinforcing the integrity of financial operations within the sector.

== See also ==
- Banking supervision
