= GoAML =

goAML system is a software solution that has been developed in a manner to incorporate a set of processes and analyze reports about potential suspicious transactions and to classify financial transactions of any type. It is designed as a robust mechanism to capture automated data collection, document management, workflow, and statistical requirements conveniently for the decision-making of the compliance officers and regulatory bodies.

GoAML system is a profound response of the United Nations Office on Drugs and Crime to strategically handle and tackle financial crime, which is often transpired in the forms of money laundering and terrorist financing. GoAML was developed by the Information Technology Service arm of the United Nations Office on Drugs and Crime in affiliation and collaboration with the UNODC Global Programme Against Money Laundering and Proceeds of Crime and the Financing of Terrorism.

== Process ==
As part of the efforts to combat criminal offenses such as money laundering and terrorist financing, Financial Intelligence Units (FIU) have opted for goAML as the most sought-after methodology for providing a comprehensive and insightful intelligence to the respective authorities to make informed decisions, including the reporting of suspicious transactions reporting mechanism.

The advent of goAML has triggered financial intelligence units in across different countries to customise and adapt themselves to a single, standardised reporting platform, enabling an opportunity to make sure that stakeholders could share information on the alarming suspicious transactions in a structured manner with the intention to exercise due diligence and to remain vigilante about any potential risks that could be triggered during the entire process. GoAML gives a similar viability to that of an environment in a sporting arena, where sportspeople can report any suspicious activities if they are influenced by bookies directly to the Anti-Corruption Unit.
