= Hunter Fraud Score =

Hunter Fraud Score is a rating score in India prepared by the credit information company Experian to help detect fraud in credit applications through analytical approach. The score was launched in 2016 and is used by Indian banks and insurance companies to help them lower their losses.

== Key features ==
- Screening data at first level and to identify inconsistencies
- More the data is found, more are the chances of fraud level
- Data sources are used which include intelligence for smart detection
- Prioritising investigations depending upon fraud level.

== Methodology ==
There are various criteria based on which information is matched in the loan application from different data sources and inconsistencies after that are identified. The company has analytical solutions which allows it to create an analytical approach to predict and calculate a score that can help banks lower their losses. A data repository was created to collect the data of all the past customers in addition to their KYC data, on which data mining is performed to filter out details and extrapolate the user's data. The solution has some customised rules to analyse different data sources to highlight inconsistencies and discrepancies so that it can match with the known fraud data. The results calculate the level of fraud risk and any application if found suspicious is moved into a special investigation tool to take further action.

In India under Section 45 of the Insurance Laws (Amendment) Act, if three years duration is crossed for any reason to reject an insurance claim then it can not be rejected after that period. So, this repository would help them catch criminals before they breach the obstacles to commit fraud. As of 2016, data from life insurers reveals that there is about 20 per cent rise year by year in fraudulent claims.

A nexus was identified of fraudulent people who get their claims passed through their relatives in the authorities which pass the claims. Depending on the screening, businesses will be able to identify applications using the hunter fraud score that have high probability of potential fraud.
