= Predicate crime =

Type of crime

In the criminal law of the United States, a predicate crime or offense is a crime which is a component of a larger crime. The larger crime may be racketeering, money laundering, financing of terrorism, etc.

For example, to violate the Racketeer Influenced and Corrupt Organization Act (RICO), a person must "engage in a pattern of racketeering activity", and in particular, must have committed at least two predicate crimes within 10 years. These include bribery, blackmail, extortion, fraud, theft, money laundering, counterfeiting, and illegal gambling.

Crimes are predicate to a larger crime if they have a similar purpose to the larger crime. For example, using false identification is itself a crime; it may be a predicate offense to larceny or fraud if it is used to withdraw money from a bank account.

Predicate crimes can be charged separately or together with the larger crime.

== Money laundering ==
Crimes that are specific to anti–money laundering (AML) programs have been referred to as Predicate Offenses (or Predicate Crimes) since the establishment of the FATF 40 Recommendations in October, 2004. Since 2004, the FATF have updated the 40 Recommendations to expand the list of predicate offences. Financial intelligence units in the European Union and United States have created legislation to mirror or expand these offences. In the United States, these offences were initially created by the Bank Secrecy Act of 1970 and have subsequently been expanded by the USA PATRIOT Act of 2001. The predicate offences are codified in 18 USC § 1956(c)(7). With the passage of the 6th EU Money Laundering Directive, the European Union has now adopted as standard set of Predicate Offences to mitigate loopholes in member state AML legislation.

Offense	EU 6MLD	FinCEN	FATF 2018	FATF 2004
Arms Trafficking	✓	✓	✓	✓
Arson		✓		
Concealment of Assets		✓		
Corruption & Bribery	✓	✓	✓	✓
Counterfeiting Currency	✓	✓	✓	✓
Counterfeiting Products	✓	✓	✓	✓
Cybercrime	✓			
Drug Trafficking	✓	✓	✓	✓
Environmental Crime	✓	✓	✓	✓
Extortion	✓	✓	✓	✓
Forgery	✓		✓	✓
Fraud	✓	✓	✓	✓
Human Trafficking / Migrant Smuggling	✓	✓	✓	✓
Insider Trading & Market Manipulation	✓		✓	✓
Kidnapping, Illegal Restraint, and Hostage-taking	✓	✓	✓	✓
Organized Crime / Racketeering	✓	✓	✓	✓
Piracy	✓	✓	✓	✓
Robbery or Theft	✓	✓	✓	✓
Sexual Exploitation	✓	✓	✓	✓
Smuggling	✓	✓	✓	✓
Tax Crimes	✓		✓	
Terrorism / Terrorist Financing	✓	✓	✓	✓
Trafficking in Stolen Goods	✓	✓	✓	✓
Violent Crime (Murder & Grievous Bodily Injury)	✓	✓	✓	✓

== Etymology ==
"Predicate" as an adjective originally means "something said of a subject", originally from Latin praedicare 'to proclaim or make known'. In U.S. legal usage, it is a "basis or foundation on which something rests".
