= Debanking =

Forced closure of a bank account by a bank

Debanking (sometimes spelled de-banking, and also known within the banking industry as de-risking) is the closure of people's or organizations' bank accounts by banks that perceive the account holders to pose a financial, legal, regulatory, or reputational risk to the bank.

Examples of this include the enforcement of anti-corruption and anti–money laundering laws, anti-terrorism efforts, and the closing of bank accounts of sex workers, or people violating immigration laws, or those considered to be politically exposed.

Debanking has been criticized for limited legal clarity and financial exclusion. It can have severe consequences for individuals, as it displaces them from accessing a range of activities within society.

== By country ==
=== Australia ===
In September 2020, ANZ was accused of discrimination by the Australian cryptocurrency exchanger Allan Flynn before the ACT Civil and Administrative Tribunal. The dispute was the first human rights action brought by a bitcoin trader against a bank, alleging discrimination on the basis of Flynn's "profession, trade, occupation, or calling", in violation of the Australian Capital Territory's anti-discrimination legislation. Flynn alleged that ANZ denied him banking services on the basis of his occupation as a cryptocurrency exchanger by closing his and his brother's bank accounts and contacting another bank about his bitcoin trading, allegedly causing the other bank to similarly deny him service. The matter between Flynn and the bank was settled in October 2021, with ANZ admitting in a statement that it had debanked Flynn because he operated a bitcoin trading service, and that this could (subject to their defences) amount to discrimination, but that they believed doing so was necessary to mitigate exposure to regulatory risk. Flynn has maintained, despite the settlement requiring him to withdraw the action, that ANZ's actions were unlawful.

In 2024, a gay sex worker in Melbourne won his discrimination case against two financial service providers for closing his accounts in 2021 due to prejudice against his occupation.

=== Canada ===
In response to the Canada convoy protest of 2022, at least 76 bank accounts linked to the protests, totaling CA$3.2 million, were frozen under the Emergencies Act. This sparked controversy, eventually leading to a court ruling that the freezing was unconstitutional. An appeal was underway as of 2024.

=== Europe ===
==== United Kingdom ====
- Nigel Farage Following the Nigel Farage Coutts bank scandal in 2023, in which Coutts & Co. removed the politician as a client, the UK government launched an investigation of debanking practices within the country's banking industry. The Financial Conduct Authority reported that banks in the UK were closing nearly one thousand accounts daily, with just over 343,000 closed in 2022, compared to about 45,000 in 2017. In September 2023, the FCA announced that it had found that banks had not been closing customers' accounts for political reasons. There had been four accounts that the FCA investigated for potentially having been closed for political reasons, but it found that the reason had actually been the way the individuals had behaved towards the staff of the respective banks. Farage dubbed the outcome 'farcical'.
- Accusations of disproportionate debanking of British Muslims have also resulted in calls for political scrutiny. The British Nigerian community has been reportedly affected as well. Poole-born Alexandra Tolstoy suspected that her account might have been closed by NatWest due to her Russian name. Baz Melia MBE accused NatWest of destroying his business by closing his and his family's accounts, which he suspected had happened because of a connection with a Saudi-based business partner. Examples of companies being debanked for trading with Ukraine have been reported by British Ukrainian business groups.
- Alexandra Tolstoy

==== Germany ====
- Tino Chrupalla
- In Autumn 2025 the cooperative bank GLS announced the closure of accounts of the German Communist Party (DKP), the Anarchist Black Cross Germany (ABC) and some weeks later the legal aid and solidarity organisation Rote Hilfe. Also another account of Rote Hilfe was closed by Sparkasse Göttingen within few days, citing Trump administration’s declaration of an enigmatic "antifa Ost" as a “terrorist” organization. The GLS bank rejected the allegation of political motives and instead cited legal and regulatory requirements, compliance obligations and liability risks including those relating to cash transfers and fundraising campaigns of DKP for Cuba. At the GLS Bank’s annual general meeting on 7 June 2026 board member Dirk Kannacher described the account closures in retrospect as “not exactly a shining example” and admitted that no preliminary discussions had taken place. Nevertheless, the general meeting approved the actions of the board by a large majority (676 out of 720 votes cast), thereby confirming the bank’s management’s course of action and meaning that the redundancies were not withdrawn.

==== Switzerland ====
- Jacques Baud's assets were subject to a freeze by the European Union in 2025.

=== United States ===
Following the 2012 Colorado Amendment 64, which legalized recreational cannabis at the state level, many legally operating dispensaries had their bank accounts closed as financial institutions faced pressure and potential penalties from federal regulators, due to cannabis remaining illegal under federal law.

The term has gained traction after being discussed on a November 2024 Joe Rogan Experience podcast episode with investor Marc Andreessen, in particular with respect to cryptocurrency assets.

Multiple instances of U.S. and Canadian banks reportedly dropping Muslim clients on questionable grounds have been covered in the media.

In August 2025, President Trump issued an executive order requiring that the banking industry ensure it does not debank anyone based on their political or religious beliefs. In September, regulators from the Federal Deposit Insurance Corporation and the Office of the Comptroller of the Currency sent written demands to large banks, seeking information going back years concerning any instance of debanking people based on political or religious grounds.

== See also ==
- Deplatforming
- Financial censorship
- Know your customer
- Unbanked
- Underbanked
- Operation Choke Point
