= China Anti-Money Laundering Monitoring and Analysis Center =

- China Anti-Money Laundering Monitoring and Analysis Center
- Nickname: CAMLMAC
- Formation: 2004
- Founder: People's Bank of China
- Headquarters: Beijing
- Location: Beijing, China
- Region served: China
- Services: anti-money laundering, finantial intelligence
- Official language: Chinese
- Owner: People's Bank of China
- Parent organization: People's Bank of China
- Staff: 94 (2015)
- Website: camlmac.pbc.gov.cn

The China Anti-Money Laundering Monitoring and Analysis Center (CAMLMAC) is a specialized administrative agency under the People's Bank of China (PBoC) that serves as the nation's primary financial intelligence unit. Established in 2004 and headquartered in Beijing, the center was created to centralize the monitoring of large-value and suspicious financial transactions following China's decision to align its domestic regulations with international standards, such as those set by the Financial Action Task Force (FATF). Operating as a core component of the country's anti-money laundering (AML) and counter-terrorist financing (CFT) framework, CAMLMAC acts as a technical hub for data collection, processing millions of reports annually from banks, insurance companies, and other financial institutions.

The legal foundation and operational significance of the China Anti-Money Laundering Monitoring and Analysis Center (CAMLMAC) are defined by the 2006 Anti-Money Laundering Law of the People's Republic of China. Under Article 10 of this legislation, the anti-money laundering administrative authority of the State Council is mandated to establish a specialized information unit dedicated to monitoring financial activities.

In 2015 they signed a Memorandum of Agreement with the US based Financial Crimes Enforcement Network.
