= Bank Secrecy Act =

1970 act of the United States Congress

Bank Secrecy Act of 1970
- Other short titles: Currency and Foreign Transactions Reporting Act; Reports of Currency and Foreign Transactions; Domestic Currency Transactions; Reports of Exports and Imports of Monetary Instruments; Foreign Transactions
- Long title: An Act to amend the Federal Deposit Insurance Act to require insured banks to maintain certain records, to require that certain transactions in U.S. currency be reported to the Department of the Treasury, and for other purposes.
- Acronyms (colloquial): BSA
- Nicknames: Federal Deposit Insurance Act Amendments
- Enacted by: the 91st United States Congress
- Effective: October 26, 1970

Citations
- Public law: 91-508
- Statutes at Large: 84 Stat. 1114-2 aka 84 Stat. 1118

Codification
- Titles amended: 12 U.S.C.: Banks and Banking; 15 U.S.C.: Commerce and Trade
- U.S.C. sections amended: 12 U.S.C. ch. 13 § 1724; 12 U.S.C. ch. 16 § 1813; 15 U.S.C. ch. 2B § 78a

Legislative history
- Introduced in the House as H.R. 15073; Passed the House on May 25, 1970 (302-0); Signed into law by President Richard Nixon on October 26, 1970

Major amendments
- USA PATRIOT Act

United States Supreme Court cases
- California Bankers Assn. v. Shultz, 416 U.S. 21 (1974); United States v. Miller, 425 U.S. 435 (1976); United States v. $8,850, 461 U.S. 555 (1983); Ratzlaf v. United States, 510 U.S. 135 (1994); United States v. Bajakajian, 524 U.S. 321 (1998); Bittner v. United States, No. 21-1195, 598 U.S. ___ (2023)

The Bank Secrecy Act of 1970 (BSA), also known as the Currency and Foreign Transactions Reporting Act, is a U.S. law requiring financial institutions in the United States to assist U.S. government agencies in detecting and preventing money laundering. Specifically, the act requires financial institutions to keep records of cash purchases of negotiable instruments, file reports if the daily aggregate exceeds $10,000, and report suspicious activity that may signify money laundering, tax evasion, or other criminal activities. Notably, any individual leaving or entering the United States with $10,000 or more in currency must report it to Customs and Border Protection (CBP). This threshold has never been adjusted for inflation since 1970, which would be equivalent to $82,905 in 2025.

The BSA is sometimes referred to as an anti-money laundering law (AML) or jointly as BSA/AML.

== History ==
The BSA was originally passed by the U.S. Congress in 1970 and signed by President Richard Nixon into law on October 26, 1970. Shortly after passage, several groups attempted to have the courts rule the law unconstitutional, claiming it violated both Fourth Amendment rights against unwarranted search and seizure, and Fifth Amendment rights of due process. Several cases were combined before the Supreme Court in California Bankers Assn. v. Shultz, 416 U.S. 21 (1974), which ruled that the Act did not violate the Constitution. Until the 1980s, there was a "prolonged period of inaction", but financial institutions eventually complied with the BSA's reporting requirements.

The statute has been amended several times, including provisions in Title III of the USA PATRIOT Act, which amended the BSA to require financial institutions to establish anti-money-laundering programs by establishing internal policies, procedures, and controls, designating compliance officers, providing ongoing employee training, and testing their programs through independent audits. There was an attempt to include another amendment in 2018, called the Illicit Arts and Antiquities Trafficking Prevention Act (IAATP). As the name implies, its aim was to restrict illegal trafficking of art in the United States which has the highest rates of money laundering in the world. It was not passed in the United States House of Representatives. This was because the aim of the IAATP did not directly correspond with the aim of the BSA which, according to Congressman Luke Messer, sponsor of the bill, is to "counteract terrorist financing and crack down on terrorist organizations like ISIS".

== Advisory Group ==
The Bank Secrecy Act Advisory Group (BSAAG) is a U.S. government–private sector forum established in 1992 by the U.S. Department of the Treasury. Its primary purpose is to enhance collaboration between financial institutions, law enforcement agencies, and regulators in implementing and improving anti-money laundering (AML) policies under the BSA. Over the years, the BSAAG has played a crucial role in shaping U.S. AML regulations and ensuring that the BSA remains responsive to new financial technologies and criminal tactics. Its recommendations have influenced major reforms, including those stemming from the USA PATRIOT Act and recent updates under the Anti-Money Laundering Act of 2020.

The BSAAG provides a forum for representatives from government agencies and financial institutions to:

- Share insights and challenges related to BSA compliance.
- Recommend improvements to reporting requirements.
- Advise on the detection and prevention of financial crimes within the scope of BSA enforcement.

The group supports the Treasury Department's enforcement of the Bank Secrecy Act, which is carried out by the Financial Crimes Enforcement Network (FinCEN).

BSAAG members represent a diverse cross-section of the financial sector and public agencies, including:

- Commercial banks, credit unions, and money services businesses.
- Regulatory bodies such as the Federal Reserve, FDIC, and SEC.
- Law enforcement agencies, including the FBI and IRS-CI.
- Technology and compliance firms offering AML solutions.

Membership is by invitation, and members typically serve three-year terms.

== Reports ==
BSA regulations require all financial institutions to submit five types of reports. Individuals must file an individual filing requirement.

=== Currency transaction reports ===
A currency transaction report (CTR) reports cash transactions exceeding $10,000 in one business day, regardless of whether it's in one transaction or several cash transactions. It is filed electronically with the Financial Crimes Enforcement Network (FinCEN) and is identified as FinCEN Form 112 (formerly Form 104).

CTRs include an individual's bank account number, name, address, and social security number. SAR reports, required when transactions indicate behavior designed to elude CTRs (or many other types of suspicious activities), include somewhat more detailed information and usually include investigation efforts on the part of the financial institution to assess the validity or nature of the transactions. A single CTR filed for a client's account is usually of no concern to the authorities, while multiple CTRs from varying institutions or a SAR suggest that activity may be suspicious.

=== Suspicious activity report ===
A suspicious activity report (SAR) must report any cash transaction where the customer seems to be trying to avoid BSA reporting requirements by not filing CTR or monetary instrument log (MIL), for example. A SAR must also be filed if the customer's actions suggest that they are laundering money or otherwise violating federal criminal laws and committing wire transfer fraud, check fraud, or mysterious disappearances. These reports are filed with FinCEN and are identified as Treasury Department Form 90-22.47 and OCC Form 8010-9, 8010-1. This requirement and its accompanying implied gag order was added by the Annunzio-Wylie Anti-Money Laundering Act § 1517(b) (part of the Housing and Community Development Act of 1992, Pub. L. 102–550, 106 Stat. 3762, 4060).

A financial institution is not allowed to inform a business or consumer that a SAR is being filed, and all the reports mandated by the BSA are exempt from disclosure under the Freedom of Information Act.

=== FBAR ===
U.S. citizens and residents with a financial interest in or authority over foreign bank accounts or "foreign financial accounts" with an aggregate value of $10,000 or more are required to file a Foreign Bank Account Report (FBAR) with the U.S. Treasury by October 15 every year. It is identified as FinCEN Form 114 (formerly Treasury Department Form 90-22.1). Additionally, they must report the interest or dividend income from the accounts on Schedule B of the Form 1040 tax form and, if a higher threshold is exceeded, also report the amounts and interest on Form 8938. Proponents of FBAR argue that it helps the United States deter financial crimes and encourage whistle-blowing for financial crimes, while critics argue that FBAR wastes time and money, "perversely discouraging compliance" without focusing on "likely criminal activity".

=== Other reports ===
A MIL must indicate cash purchases of monetary instruments, such as money orders, cashier's checks, and traveler's checks valued between $3,000 and $10,000. This form is required to be kept on record at the financial institution for at least five years, and produced at the request of examiners or audit to verify compliance.

The "Report of International Transportation of Currency or Monetary Instruments", also referred to as a Currency and Monetary Instrument Report (CMIR), must be filed by each person or institution that physically transports, mails, or ships, or causes to be physically transported, mailed, shipped, or received, currency, traveler's checks, and certain other monetary instruments in an aggregate amount exceeding $10,000 into or out of the United States must file a CMIR. It is identified as FinCEN Form 105 Report.

Banks are required to file a Designation of Exempt Person (FinCEN Form 110) to designate an exempt customer for the purpose of CTR reporting under the BSA. In addition, banks use this form once every two years to renew exemptions for eligible non-listed business and payroll customers.

It also requires any business receiving one or more related cash payments totaling more than $10,000 to file IRS/FinCEN Form 8300.

== Sanctions ==
There are heavy penalties for individuals and financial institutions that fail to file CTRs, MILs, or SARs. There are also penalties for banks who disclose to its client that it has filed a SAR about the client. Penalties include heavy fines and prison sentences. IRC §6038D requires that all U.S. persons, individuals, corporations, partnerships, LLCs, and trusts, provide timely information regarding their foreign accounts, otherwise a $10,000 penalty will result for every month it is late (subject to a certain maximum penalty).

In 1998, the Supreme Court ruled in United States v. Bajakajian that the government may not confiscate money from an individual for failure to report it on a Currency and Other Monetary Instruments Report (CMIR), as such punishment would be "grossly disproportional to the gravity of [the] offense" and unconstitutional under the Excessive Fines clause of the Eighth Amendment. Bajakajian and his family had tried to take $357,144 out of the United States in their luggage, and the government had seized it under the Bank Secrecy Act, which allows forfeiture of "any property, real or personal, involved in such offense". It was the first time the Supreme Court struck down the federal government's "aggressive use of forfeiture".

In March 2010, Wachovia admitted to "serious and systemic" violations of the Bank Secrecy Act for laundering $378 billion between 2004 and 2007, the largest violation in terms of a dollar amount. It allowed Mexican and Colombian drug cartels to launder money through casas de cambio by willfully failing to set up an effective anti-money-laundering program.

In 2022, Arthur Hayes, entrepreneur and co-founder and former CEO of cryptocurrency exchange BitMEX, pled guilty to Bank Secrecy Act violations and was sentenced to six months of home detention, two years of probation, and a $10 million fine.

== Additional information ==
An entire industry has developed around providing software to analyze transactions in an attempt to identify transactions or patterns of transactions called structuring, which requires SAR filing. Financial institutions are subject to penalties for failing to properly file CTRs and SARs, such as heavy fines and regulatory restrictions, including charter revocation.

These software applications effectively monitor customer transactions on a daily basis and, using a customer's past transactions and account profile, provide a "whole picture" of the customer to the bank management. Transaction monitoring can include cash deposits and withdrawals, wire transfers, and ACH activity. In the banking industry, these applications are known as "BSA software" or "anti-money laundering software".

== See also ==
- Casino regulations under the Bank Secrecy Act
- Continuing Criminal Enterprise
- Customer Identification Program
- FATF Blacklist
- Financial Action Task Force on Money Laundering
- Financial Services Authority
- Know your customer
- Money Laundering Control Act
- Suspicious activity report
- SWIFT
