= Politically exposed person =

Person with a prominent public function

A politically exposed person (PEP) in financial regulation is one who has been entrusted with a prominent public function. A PEP generally presents a higher risk for potential involvement in bribery and corruption by virtue of their position and the influence they may hold. The terms "politically exposed person" and senior foreign political figure are often used interchangeably, particularly in international forums.

== FATF definition ==
While there is no global definition of a PEP, many countries base their definitions on those from the Financial Action Task Force on Money Laundering (FATF) from 2013. The FATF is an international body, founded in 1989 on the initiative of the G7 and hosted by the OECD, that sets standards and promotes the implementation of measures against money laundering, terrorism financing and financing of proliferation of weapons of mass destruction to preserve the integrity of the global financial system.

Since February 2012, the FATF's latest definition of PEPs, revised from 2003, has been as follows:

Foreign PEPs
Individuals who are or have been entrusted with prominent public functions by a foreign country, for example, heads of state or heads of government, senior politicians, senior government, judicial or military officials, senior executives of state-owned corporations, important political party officials.
Domestic PEPs
Individuals who are or have been entrusted domestically with prominent public functions, for example, heads of state or of government, senior politicians, members of parliament, senior government, judicial or military officials, senior executives of state-owned corporations, important political party officials.
Persons who are or have been entrusted with a prominent function by a state-owned enterprise or an international organisation refers to members of senior management, i.e. directors, deputy directors and board members or equivalent functions.

Regulations for PEPs extend to family members or close associates, any individual known publicly or known by the financial institution to be a close personal or professional associate.

=== Unique risks ===
Foreign PEPs pose a unique risk as their influence and connections may not be as easily recognizable or understood by institutions outside their home country.

Political insider trading is regulated by insider trading regulation such as STOCK Act.

== History ==
A forerunner definition was by the 1997 OECD Anti-Bribery Convention aimed at reducing corruption, which came into force February 1999. It used the term foreign official.

The designation "politically exposed person" dates back to the late 1990s, in what was known as the "Abacha Affair." Sani Abacha was a Nigerian dictator who organized a large-scale, systematic theft of assets from the Central Bank of Nigeria for some years with his family members and associates. It is believed that several billion dollars were stolen, and that the funds were transferred to bank accounts in the United Kingdom and Switzerland.

In 2001, the Nigerian Government succeeding the Abacha regime made an effort to recover the money, and lodged complaints with several European agencies, including the Federal Office of Police of Switzerland, which investigated close to 60 Swiss banks. and in this investigation, the concept of "politically exposed person" emerged, around which the UN organised a committee in December 2000. This eventually led to the October 2003 resolution of the United Nations Convention against Corruption, entered into force in December 2005, with ongoing annual reviews of implementation and asset recovery. In 2004 this had become a European Union law.

PEP-specific compliance legislation addresses the link between government corruption, money laundering and terrorism financing. Since September 11, 2001, more than 100 countries have changed their laws related to financial services regulation, combating political corruption.

Heavy fines have been imposed on financial institutions for conducting business with PEPs without following adequate procedures, as in 2004 in the case of Riggs Bank in Washington, D.C.

In spite of regulation, political leaders like Muammar Gaddafi and Hosni Mubarak made news in 2013 for having frozen assets in US banks that did not follow due diligence.

== Risk screening and PEP datasets ==
Most financial institutions view a PEP as a potential compliance risk, and perform enhanced monitoring of accounts that fall within this category. Screening for PEPs is usually performed at the beginning of account opening, called standard due diligence or KYC. Screening of accounts periodically is performed as part of ongoing due diligence.

There are a number of companies advertising for regulatory, financial and reputational risk screening.

Due diligence to uncover PEPs can be time-consuming and requires the checking of names, dates of birth, national identification numbers and photos of clients against a reputable database of known PEPs, which usually contains over one million profiles. No 'official' PEP list exists. The CIA and UN have lists of heads of state, which fall under the PEP definitions of FATF.

Vendors maintain their own particular database of PEPs and other high-risk customers.

There are several crowd-sourced lists of PEPs being made available utilizing public contributions.

== By country ==
Most of the 39 FATF member countries treat domestic and foreign PEPs with heightened scrutiny. The FATF guidance implies that if a person is a foreign PEP, it makes them a de facto domestic PEP within their own country.

=== Australia ===
Under Australia's Anti-Money Laundering (AML) and Counter-Terrorism Financing (CTF) Rules, PEPs are individuals who occupy a prominent public position or functions in a government body or international organisation, both within and outside Australia. This definition also extends to their immediate family members and close associates.

The AML/CTF rules define three categories of PEPs:

- Domestic PEPs are individuals who hold a prominent public position or function in an Australian government body.
- Foreign PEPs are individuals who hold a prominent public position or function in a government body of a foreign country.
- International organisation PEPs are individuals who hold a prominent public position or function in an international organisation.

A reporting entity must have procedures to identify whether any individual customer or beneficial owner is a PEP, or an associate of a PEP. The reporting entity must undertake this identification process before it provides the customer with a designated service, or as soon as practicable afterwards. A reporting entity must implement additional due diligence measures and risk management systems where the PEP is high money laundering or terrorism financing risk, or is a foreign PEP.

=== Canada ===
Canada considers all foreign PEPs to pose a money laundering and terrorist financing risk. Under the latest amendments to the Proceeds of Crime (Money Laundering) and Terrorist Financing Act (which initially went into effect in 2001), a PEP includes all domestic PEPs and Heads of International Organisations (HIOs).

Within Canada, a domestic PEP is defined as "a person who currently holds, or has held within the last 5 years, a specific office or position in or on behalf of the Canadian federal government, a Canadian provincial (or territorial) government, or a Canadian municipal government." Domestic PEPs in Canada retain their classification until 5 years after they leave office.

When a person is determined to be a foreign PEP, they remain so forever (including deceased foreign PEPs).

=== Chile ===
In Chile, financial institutions are mandated to report any transaction suspicious for potential involvement in bribery by virtue of a PEP's position and the influence that they may hold. As of 2015, 2,200 to 3,000 individuals are considered PEPs, 150 of them foreign, and also their second-grade relatives are under financial observation by the institutions.

=== Egypt ===
Egypt is a member of the Middle East and North Africa Financial Action Task Force (MENAFATF) and has committed to implementing the FATF's AML/CFT recommendations. PEP screening in Egypt is required for foreign and domestic PEPs, while international PEP screening is not required.

=== European Union ===
The European Union defined the term politically exposed person in the directive 2006/70/EC, later replaced by the directive 2015/849 (article 3, number 9) and amended April 2023.

=== Hong Kong ===
In the wake of the June 2020 imposition of the Hong Kong national security law by the PRC Standing Committee of the National People's Congress, the scrutiny of PEPs at some banks "involved combing through comments made by clients and their associates in public and in media, and social media posts in the recent past." The new law "prohibits what Beijing describes broadly as secession, subversion, terrorism and collusion with foreign forces", with maximum penalties of up to life terms in prison. HSBC, Credit Suisse, Julius Baer and UBS declined to comment to the Daily Telegraph for a 20 July 2020 news article. Pro-democracy lawyer Albert Ho said that he feared that "people like him" may face "difficulties in the times to come... There's not much you can do, actually, unless you cease all your financial and banking activities in Hong Kong."

=== Singapore ===
Under Singapore's Monetary Authority of Singapore (MAS) Notice 626 - Prevention of Money Laundering and Countering the Financing of terrorism (Banks), PEPs are persons, either domestic or foreign, who are entrusted with prominent public functions. Prominent public functions includes the roles held by a head of state, a head of government, government ministers, senior civil or public servants, senior judicial or military officials, senior executives of state-owned corporations, senior political party officials, members of the legislature and senior management of international organisations. Relatives or close associates ("RCAs") to PEPs are also categorised as PEPs.

MAS requires financial institutions to apply enhanced customer due diligence on customers that are identified to be PEPs.

=== South Africa ===
In South Africa, the Financial Intelligence Centre amended the Financial Intelligence Centre Act to refer to Politically Influential Persons (PIP) instead of PEP. This was done in order to include private sector officials who have business dealings with public sector officials and elected officials in the public services procurement deals.

=== Spain ===
In Spain, politically exposed persons are generally referred to in legislation as personas con responsabilidad pública (PRPs). Article 14 of Law 10/2010 covers persons who perform or have performed prominent public functions.

The Spanish framework includes senior national and regional officeholders, senior judicial, prosecutorial, military and diplomatic positions, members of the management or supervisory bodies of state-owned enterprises, and senior leadership positions in political parties, trade unions and business organisations. At local level, it includes mayors, councillors and equivalent senior officials in provincial capitals, capitals of autonomous communities and local entities with more than 50,000 inhabitants.

Specified family members and close associates are also subject to the enhanced due-diligence measures applicable to PRPs. After a person leaves the relevant public function, these measures continue for two years; after that period, obliged entities must apply measures according to any residual risk associated with the person's former position.

=== United Kingdom ===
As of June 2017, the UK's PEP definition is identical to the 2012 FATF definition, i.e. including reference to domestic PEPs; it is found in the Money Laundering Regulations 2017 Section 35(12). A PEP is considered to be any individual who fits any of the criteria listed below:

- A foreign person who has held any time in the preceding year a prominent public function outside the United Kingdom, in a state or international institution
- Members of courts of auditors or of the boards of central banks
- Ambassadors, chargés d'affaires and high-ranking officers in the armed forces
- Members of the administrative, management or supervisory bodies of state-owned enterprises
- Heads of state, heads of government, ministers and deputy or assistant ministers
- Members of parliaments
- Members of supreme courts, constitutional courts or of other high-level judicial bodies

The definition explicitly excludes middle-ranking or more junior officials.

PEP status also extends to relatives and close associates. Relatives and close associates include a spouse, a partner, children and their spouses or partners and parents. While other family members may not qualify under this definition, it may be appropriate to consider that other family members can also be used as a front for corrupt activities. Therefore, it may be appropriate to apply the definition to other extended family members that may have increased risk factors present and apply the requirements of the regulation (e.g. a PEP with material negative information may use their brother as a front for processing their proceeds of corruption). Close associates include any individual who is known to have joint beneficial ownership of a legal entity or legal arrangement, or any other close business relations. It also includes any individual who has sole beneficial ownership of a legal entity or legal arrangement which is known to have been set up for the benefit of a person referred to in regulation.

The Financial Conduct Authority and Joint Money Laundering Steering Group both publish comprehensive guidance on both PEPs and other know-your-customer (KYC) related matters to assist firms in complying with their legal obligations.

=== United States ===
The term foreign official has been used by US enforcement agencies relating to persons who have similar characteristics as PEPs, as referenced in the US Foreign Corrupt Practices Act 15 U.S.C. § 78dd-1. It is used in all industries, not only by financial institutions. The Treasury's Financial Crimes Enforcement Network (FinCEN) did not use the term PEP in its regulations as of 2010. Suspicious activity requires a financial institution to submit a suspicious activity report to FinCEN. The term 'Senior Foreign Political Figure', as defined by section 312 of the USA PATRIOT Act is to a great extent similar to the definition of a PEP, and also excludes middle-ranking or more junior individuals. The term PEP is recognized (and was defined) by the Wolfsberg Group of 11 global banks.

== See also ==
- Bribery Act 2010 (UKBA)
- Nigel Farage Coutts bank scandal
- Suspicious activity report
- US PATRIOT Act
