= Money Laundering and Financial Crimes Strategy Act =

1998 U.S. federal law on money laundering prevention

The Money Laundering and Financial Crimes Strategy Act of 1998 is a U.S. federal law aimed at enhancing efforts to combat money laundering and related financial crimes. Passed by the Senate on October 15, 1998, the Act broadens the definition of money laundering to include the movement of illicit funds into, out of, or through the United States, as well as definitions under state and local laws.

The Act directs the President, through the Secretary of the Treasury and in consultation with the Attorney General, to develop a national strategy to combat such crimes. This strategy must be updated annually for five years and include goals, prevention efforts, enforcement initiatives, public-private partnerships, intergovernmental cooperation, and the identification of high-risk areas.

It also authorizes the designation of high-risk geographic areas or sectors and establishes a grant program to support state and local law enforcement in those areas. Funding was authorized for fiscal years 1999 through 2003.
