= Structuring =

Redesigning of a large transaction as multiple small transactions to avoid scrutiny

Structuring, also known as smurfing in banking jargon, is the practice of executing financial transactions such as making bank deposits in a specific pattern, calculated to avoid triggering financial institutions to file reports required by law, such as the United States' Bank Secrecy Act (BSA) and Internal Revenue Code section 6050I (relating to the requirement to file Form 8300). Structuring may be done in the context of money laundering, fraud, and other financial crimes. Legal restrictions on structuring are concerned with limiting the size of domestic transactions for individuals.

== Overview ==
Structuring is the act of parceling what would otherwise be a large financial transaction into a series of smaller transactions to avoid scrutiny by regulators and law enforcement. Typically each of the smaller transactions is executed in an amount below some statutory limit that normally does not require a financial institution to file a report with a government agency. Criminal enterprises may employ several agents ("smurfs") to make the transaction. Structuring appears in federal indictments related to money laundering, fraud, and other financial crimes.

The term "smurfing" is derived from the image of the comic book characters the Smurfs having a large group of many small entities. Miami-based lawyer Gregory Baldwin is said to have coined the term in the 1980s.

== Regulations ==
=== United States ===
In the United States, the Bank Secrecy Act requires currency transaction reports (CTRs) to be filed for cash transactions involving coin or paper money valued at more than $10,000; it applies to both U.S. and foreign currencies. Contrary to popular misunderstanding, it does not apply to checks or electronic transactions. Financial institutions suspecting deposit structuring with intent to avoid the law are required to file a suspicious activity report (SAR). In 1986, the U.S. Congress enacted section 5324 of Title 31 of the United States Code, which provides (in part):

No person shall, for the purpose of evading the reporting requirements of section 5313 (a) or 5325 or any regulation prescribed under any such section, the reporting or record keeping requirements imposed by any order issued under section 5326, or the record keeping requirements imposed by any regulation prescribed under section 21 of the Federal Deposit Insurance Act or section 123 of Public Law 91–508—[...] (3) structure or assist in structuring, or attempt to structure or assist in structuring, any transaction with one or more domestic financial institutions.

Section 5324 further provides that a violation of this provision may be punished by a fine or up to five years in prison, or both. The filing of Form 8300 is required under Internal Revenue Code section 6050I.

Sums of money resulting from deposits of less than $10,000 may be seized after a warrant is issued based on a suspicious activity report. Legal proceedings, which may cost in the vicinity of $20,000 or more, may be required for an innocent party to retrieve his or her money. Reports in October 2014 by The New York Times of arbitrary seizures resulted in modification of Internal Revenue Service (IRS) practice to focus on investigations that "closely align" with IRS "mission and key priorities". Banks are not permitted to warn or advise customers unless the customer asks, but sometimes bank tellers will informally warn customers.

=== Outside the United States ===
Jurisdiction	Single transaction	Notes
Australia	AU$10,000	Although there are no weekly or monthly limits, any parceling to evade the rules is a criminal offence.
Brazil	varies	Depends on transaction type.
Canada	CA$10,000	All transactions totaling CA$10,000 within a 24-hour period are subject to reporting. Certain businesses may qualify for Alternative to Large Cash Transaction (ALCT) reporting.
Germany	€15,000	€10,000 for goods deals.
Ireland	€10,000	Per the 4th EU Anti-Money Laundering Directive (2017)
Italy	€12,500	
Netherlands	€15,000	
Sweden	€10,000	
Switzerland	CHF 15,000	Under Switzerland's self-regulatory approach, banks through the Swiss Bankers Association set and enforce their own due diligence rules under Art. 25 AMLA supervision. Their code requires customer verification for cash transactions exceeding CHF 15,000 to prevent structuring of payments. Merchants face a higher threshold, requiring customer identification for cash transactions above CHF 100,000, including when multiple related transactions reach this amount.
Thailand	US$58,000	

== Other uses ==
The term "smurfing" is also applied to activity associated with controlled substances such as pseudoephedrine. In this context, the agent will make purchases of small, legal amounts from several drug and grocery stores, with the intent to aggregate the lot for use in the illegal production of methamphetamine. Also, since the monthly pseudoephedrine purchase limits in US are too low for mass meth production, this practice often involves using multiple "smurfs".

As Robert Pennal of the Fresno Meth Task Force explains:

Then we started seeing "smurfing." Remember how the smurfs were little gatherers? We started getting calls from different retail stores that people were buying two or three packs—that's the most you can buy—and they went to one store, they bought three, they went to another store, bought three. We're seeing blister packs everywhere because they're sitting in the car, they're punching the pills out of the blister packs, they're putting them in the freezer bags and they're turning them over to chemical brokers.

== See also ==
- Salami slicing tactics, the phenomenon of achieving a larger action or result that would be difficult or illegal to carry out at once by splitting it into many smaller actions
