= Money Laundering Suppression Act =

- Enacted by: the 103rd United States Congress

Citations
- Public law: Pub. L. 103–325

Legislative history
- Introduced in the House on November 9, 1993; Passed the House on November 21, 1993; Passed the Senate on March 17, 1994 (with amendment); Reported by the joint conference committee on July 25, 1994; agreed to by the House on August 4, 1994 and by the Senate on August 9, 1994; Signed into law by President Bill Clinton on September 23, 1994

The Money Laundering Suppression Act of 1994 is a U.S. federal law aimed at improving the detection and prevention of money laundering, passed in September 1994 as a title within the Riegle Community Development and Regulatory Improvement Act of 1994. It revised currency transaction reporting rules for depository institutions and required the Treasury to streamline these reports and centralize the reporting of suspicious activity. It is not to be confused with the bill of the same name, which was passed by the House but not the Senate.

The Act enhanced training and examination procedures for banking regulators, expanded federal oversight to include certain foreign negotiable instruments and casinos, and imposed new penalties for structuring transactions to avoid detection. It also required registration of money transmitting businesses and encouraged states to adopt uniform regulations for non-bank currency services.

Overall, the law strengthened coordination between financial institutions, regulators, and law enforcement to better combat financial crime.
