= Currency transaction report =

American financial report

Currency Transaction Report, March 2011 revision

A currency transaction report (CTR) is a report that U.S. financial institutions are required to file with the Financial Crimes Enforcement Network for each deposit, withdrawal, exchange of currency, or other payment or transfer, by, through, or to the financial institution which involves a transaction in currency valued at more than $10,000. In this context, currency means the coin and/or paper money of any country that is designated as legal tender by the country of issuance. Currency also includes U.S. silver certificates, U.S. notes, Federal Reserve notes, and official foreign bank notes. Contrary to popular misunderstanding, these reports do not apply to, and are not used for, non-currency transactions such as checks, nor for electronic transfers such as wire and ACH/EFT.

== History ==
When the first version of the CTR was introduced, the only way a suspicious transaction less than $10,000 was reported to the government was if a bank teller called law enforcement. This was primarily due to the financial industry's concern about the right to financial privacy. The Bank Secrecy Act requires financial institutions to report currency transaction amounts of over $10,000.

== Procedure ==
When a transaction involving more than $10,000 in cash is processed, most banks have a system that automatically creates a CTR electronically. Tax and other information about the customer is usually pre-filled by the bank software. CTRs since 1996 include an optional checkbox at the top if the bank employee believes the transaction to be suspicious or fraudulent, commonly called a Suspicious Activity Report (SAR). A customer is not directly told about the $10,000 threshold unless they initiate the inquiry. A customer may decline to continue the transaction upon being informed about the CTR, but this would require the bank employee to file a SAR. Once a customer presents or asks to withdraw more than $10,000 in currency, the decision to continue the transaction must continue as originally requested and may not be reduced to avoid the filing of a CTR. For instance, if a customer reneges on their initial request to deposit or withdraw more than $10,000 in cash, and instead requests the same transaction for $9,999, the bank employee should deny such a request and continue the transaction as originally requested by filing a CTR. This sort of attempt is known as structuring, and is punishable by federal law against both the customer and the bank employee. Customers who frequently perform currency transactions just under the $10,000 threshold will likely subject themselves to scrutiny and/or the filing of a SAR.
