= Money services business =

Legal term in financial regulation

Money services business (MSB) is a legal term used by financial regulators to describe businesses that transmit or convert money. The definition was created to encompass more than just banks which normally provide these services to include non-bank financial institutions.

An MSB has specific meanings in different jurisdictions, but generally includes any business that transmits money or representatives of money, provides foreign currency exchange such as bureaux de change, or cashes cheques or other money-related instruments. It is often used in the context of anti money-laundering (AML) legislation and rules. Money services businesses are regulated in different countries differently. They governed by their local regulators and have to adhere with record-keeping requirements to conduct customer due diligence if customers request for an amount of foreign currency that exceeds a certain threshold set to detect money laundering.

An MSB often provides an essential financial service to underdeveloped regions with limited or no banking services and may be a small organisation with outlets like grocery stores, drugstores, pharmacies or convenience stores. It may include regional networks of post offices, banks or agents.

== See also ==
- Alternative financial services
- Hawala
- Major MSBs
- Suspicious activity report
