= Terrorism financing =

Providing financial support to individual terrorists or terrorist organizations

Terrorism financing is the provision of funds or providing financial support to individual terrorists or non-state actors.

Most countries have implemented measures to counter terrorism financing (CTF) often as part of their money laundering laws. Some countries and multinational organisations have created a list of organisations that they regard as terrorist organisations, though there is no consistency as to which organisations are designated as being terrorist by each country. The Financial Action Task Force on Money Laundering (FATF) has made recommendations to members relating to CTF. It has created a Blacklist and Greylist of countries that have not taken adequate CTF/AML action. As of 3 April 2026, the FATF blacklist (High-Risk Jurisdictions subject to a Call for Action) listed three countries for AML deficits and terrorism financing: North Korea, Iran and Myanmar. The FATF greylist (Jurisdictions under Increased Monitoring) currently consists of 22 countries: Algeria, Angola, Bolivia, Bulgaria, Cameroon, Ivory Coast, Democratic Republic of the Congo, Haiti, Kenya, Kuwait, Laos, Lebanon, Monaco, Namibia, Nepal, Papua New Guinea, South Sudan, Syria, Venezuela, Vietnam, Virgin Islands and Yemen. In general, the supply of funds to designated terrorist organisations is outlawed, though the enforcement varies.

Initially, the focus of CTF efforts was on non-profit organizations, unregistered money services businesses (MSBs) (including so-called underground banking or ‘Hawalas’) and the criminalisation of the act itself.

== Methods used for terrorism funding ==
A number of countries and multinational organisations maintain lists of organisations that they designate as terrorist organisations, though there is no consistency as to which organisations are so designated. In the United States, the Treasury Department's Office of Foreign Assets Control (OFAC) maintains such a list. Financial transactions that benefit the designated terrorist organisations are usually outlawed.

Designated terrorist organisations may adopt a variety of strategies to get past efforts to prevent such funding. For example, they may make multiple smaller-value transfers in an attempt to bypass scrutiny; or they may use people who have no criminal backgrounds to complete financial transactions to try to make fund transfers harder to track. These transactions may also be disguised as donations to charities or as gifts to family members. Countries are not able to combat terrorism on their own, as corporate actors are needed to scan financial transactions themselves. If corporate actors do not comply with the state then penalties or regulatory sanctions may be applied.

Terrorists and terrorist organizations often use any resource of money they can have access to in order to fund themselves. This can range from the distribution of narcotics, black market oil, having businesses such as car dealerships, taxi companies, etc. ISIS is known to use black market oil distribution as a means of funding their terrorist activity.

The internet is a growing modern form of terrorist finance as it is able to protect the anonymity that it can provide to the donor and recipient. Terrorist organizations use propaganda in order to rally up financial support from those who follow them. They are also able to find funds through criminal activity on the internet such as stealing online banking information from people who are not correlated to these terrorist organizations. Terrorist organizations also use the front of being a charity to finance themselves. Al-Qaeda is a known terrorist organization that has used the internet in order to finance their organization, as through this platform they are able to reach a wider audience.

=== Money laundering ===
Often linked in legislation and regulation, terrorism financing and money laundering are conceptual opposites. Money laundering is the process where cash raised from criminal activities is made to look legitimate for re-integration into the financial system, whereas terrorism financing cares little about the source of the funds, but it is what the funds are to be used for that defines its scope.

An in-depth study of the symbiotic relationship between organized crime and terrorist organizations detected within the United States and other countries referred to as crime-terror nexus points has been published in the forensic literature. The Perri, Lichtenwald and MacKenzie article emphasizes the importance of multi-agency working groups and the tools that can be used to identify, infiltrate, and dismantle organizations operating along the crime-terror nexus points.

Bulk cash smuggling and placement through cash-intensive businesses is one typology. They are now also moving money through the new online payment systems. They also use trade-linked schemes to launder money. Nonetheless, the older systems have not given way. Terrorists also continue to move money through MSBs/Hawalas, and through international ATM transactions. Charities also continue to be used in countries where controls are not so stringent.

Said and Cherif Kouachi, before the Charlie Hebdo shooting in Paris, France in 2015, used transaction laundering to fund their activities. Examples included reselling counterfeit goods and drugs.

"This chain of funding shows a clear correlation between transaction laundering and terrorism, using legitimate marketplaces to conduct illegal activity (in this case, selling counterfeit shoes) and then using the proceeds to launder money for terrorists."

=== Preventing funding of terrorism ===
AML and CTF both carry the notion of Know Your Customer (KYC), this entails financial organizations to have in-person identification and to observe the lawfulness of the transaction in question. Although this methodology is not favoured by banks, lawyers or other professionals who are able to see the transaction of money or legal aid occurring, because of the business and client relationship that can be hurt through the process of personal identification. This can damage relationships between long-term clients who need to prove their identity, and respected members of society do not want to be asked for personal identification every time.

The FATF Blacklist (the Non-Cooperative Countries or Territories list) mechanism was used to coerce countries to bring about change.

=== Suspicious activity ===
Operation Green Quest, a US multi-agency task force established in October 2001 with the official purpose of countering terrorism financing considers the following patterns of activity as indicators of the collection and movement of funds that could be associated with terrorism financing:

- Account transactions that are inconsistent with past deposits or withdrawals such as cash, cheques, wire transfers, etc.
- Transactions involving a high volume of incoming or outgoing wire transfers, with no logical or apparent purpose that come from, go to, or transit through locations of concern, that is sanctioned countries, non-cooperative nations and sympathizer nations.
- Unexplainable clearing or negotiation of third party cheques and their deposits in foreign bank accounts.
- Structuring at multiple branches or the same branch with multiple activities.
- Corporate layering, transfers between bank accounts of related entities or charities for no apparent reasons.
- Wire transfers by charitable organisations to companies located in countries known to be banks or tax havens.
- Lack of apparent fundraising activity, for example, a lack of small cheques or typical donations associated with charitable bank deposits.
- Using multiple accounts to collect funds that are then transferred to the same foreign beneficiaries
- Transactions with no logical economic purpose, that is, no link between the activity of the organization and other parties involved in the transaction.
- Overlapping corporate officers, bank signatories, or other identifiable similarities associated with addresses, references and financial activities.
- Cash debiting schemes in which deposits in the US correlate directly with ATM withdrawals in countries of concern. Reverse transactions of this nature are also suspicious.
- Issuing cheques, money orders or other financial instruments, often numbered sequentially, to the same person or business, or to a person or business whose name is spelled similarly.

It would be difficult to determine by such activity alone whether the particular act was related to terrorism or to organized crime. For this reason, these activities must be examined in context with other factors in order to determine a terrorism financing connection. Simple transactions can be found to be suspect and money laundering derived from terrorism will typically involve instances in which simple operations had been performed (retail foreign exchange operations, international transfer of funds) revealing links with other countries including FATF blacklisted countries. Some of the customers may have police records, particularly for trafficking in narcotics and weapons and may be linked with foreign terrorist groups. The funds may have moved through a state sponsor of terrorism or a country where there is a terrorism problem. A link with a Politically exposed person (PEP) may ultimately link up to a terrorism financing transaction. A charity may be a link in the transaction. Accounts (especially students) that only receive periodic deposits withdrawn via ATM over two months and are dormant at other periods could indicate that they are becoming active to prepare for an attack.

== Nation specific actions ==
=== Pakistan ===
As at 24 October 2019, Pakistan was on the FATF greylist for terrorism financing and has met only 5 of 27 action items, and it has been given four months to comply with the remaining action points for the prevention of terror financing. As of 2022 Pakistan is compliant on most of the action plan but continues to be on the list.

=== Bahrain ===
Bahrain has been regularly accused of doing very little to prevent the flow of funds for terrorism financing in other nations.

=== Saudi Arabia ===
Saudi Arabia has been accused of not doing enough to stop terrorism financing by private parties.

A report by FATF highlighted serious deficiencies in Saudi Arabia's efforts to counter-terrorism. Terrorism financing budding in Saudi Arabia became an important source of funding for al-Qaeda and other terrorist organizations.

In a leaked classified memo, Hillary Clinton said that in 2009 the kingdom was a crucial source of funds to Sunni terrorist groups, including al-Qaeda, the Taliban and Lashkar-e-Taiba pointing to its intelligence incompetence.

In 2019, the European Commission added Saudi Arabia, along with several other countries, to its blacklist list of states that have failed to control money laundering and terrorism financing. Saudi Arabia has been accused of not making enough effort to control the huge amounts of money being transferred to Islamist extremists and terrorist groups.

=== United Arab Emirates ===
Until its removal from the list in 2024, the United Arab Emirates had been accused by the FATF of being a financial hub for terrorist organisations. The OCCRP suggested that this might have been premature. Historically, the UAE banking system was found to be involved in the attacks on 11 September 2001 against the United States carried out by al-Qaeda. The 9/11 terrorists had bank accounts in the UAE. Executing the attack cost the terrorist group around $400,000–500,000, out of which $300,000 was transacted via one of the hijackers’ bank accounts in the US. The movement of funds took place with the help of both public banking systems and the Al-Qaeda established Hawala networks.

According to the 9/11 Commission Report, in response to concerns that the UAE banking system had been used by 9/11 hijackers to launder funds, the UAE adopted legislation giving the Central Bank in 2002 the power to freeze suspect accounts for 7 days without prior legal authorisation. The report stated, "banks have been advised to carefully monitor transactions passing through the UAE from Saudi Arabia and Pakistan and are now subject to more stringent transaction and client reporting requirements." The UAE government has since affirmed its stance and policy of zero tolerance towards terrorism financing.

The US Treasury Department alleged a business network spread across the UAE, the Horn of Africa and Cyprus of laundering millions of dollars to al-Shabaab. The Office of Foreign Assets Control (OFAC) sanction 16 firms and individuals involved in the money laundering network. A key financial facilitator of al-Shabaab is Dubai-based Haleel Commodities L.L.C., along with its subsidiaries and branches in Uganda, Kenya, Somalia and Cyprus.

== Legislation against terrorist financing ==
The United States Patriot Act, passed after the September 11 attacks in 2001, gives the US government anti-money laundering powers to monitor financial institutions. The Patriot Act has generated a great deal of controversy in the United States since its enactment. The United States has also collaborated with the United Nations and other countries to create the Terrorist Finance Tracking Program.

Many initiatives have stemmed from the USA PATRIOT Act such as the Financial Crimes Enforcement Network, which focuses specifically on money laundering and financial crimes.

Uniting and Strengthening America by Providing Appropriate Tools Required to Intercept and Obstruct Terrorism Act, also known as the USA PATRIOT Act, was also enacted in 2001. In 2009 the act aided in blocking around $20 million and another $280 million that came from State Sponsors of Terrorism.

In 2020, Veit Buetterlin, who conducted investigations on-site in more than 20 countries and who was kidnapped in the course of his work, explained in an interview with CNN that the fight against terrorism financing will be an ongoing challenge (“it’s actually impossible to defeat a concept”). He noted that the world’s top 10 terrorist organizations have an estimated annual budget of USD 3.6 billion.

=== Australia ===
Australian anti-terrorism financing laws include:

- Criminal Code Act 1995 (Cth):
  - section 102.6 (getting funds to, from or for a terrorist organisation)
  - section 102.7 (providing support to a terrorist organisation)
  - section 103.1 (financing terrorism)
  - section 103.2 (financing a terrorist), and
  - section 119.4(5) (giving or receiving goods and services to promote the commission of a foreign incursion offence).
- Charter of the United Nations Act 1945 (Cth):
  - section 20 (dealing with freezable assets), and
  - section 21 (giving an asset to a proscribed person or entity).

These offences sanction persons and entities under Australian and international law. The responsibility of prosecuting these offences in Australia rests with the Australian Federal Police, State police forces and the Commonwealth Director of Public Prosecutions.

=== Germany ===
In July 2010, Germany outlawed the Internationale Humanitäre Hilfsorganisation (IHH), saying it has used donations to support projects in Gaza that are related to Hamas, which is considered by the European Union to be a terrorist organization, while presenting their activities to donors as humanitarian help. German Interior Minister Thomas de Maiziere said, "Donations to so-called social welfare groups belonging to Hamas, such as the millions given by IHH, actually support the terror organization Hamas as a whole."

According to research conducted by the Abba Eban Institute as part of an initiative called Janus Initiative, Hezbollah is financed through non-profit organizations such as the “Orphans Project Lebanon”, a German-based charity for Lebanese orphans. It found that it had been donating portions of its contributions to a foundation which finances the families of Hezbollah members who commit suicide bombings. The European Foundation for Democracy published that the “Orphans Project Lebanon” organization directly channels financial donations from Germany to the Lebanese Al-Shahid Association, which is part of the Hezbollah network and promotes suicide bombings in Lebanon, particularly among children. In Germany, financial donations to the Orphans Project Lebanon are tax-deductible and thus subsidized by the German State's tax policy.

In 2018, an investigation by the U.S. Drug Enforcement Administration (DEA) called “Operation Cedar” led to the arrest of Hezbollah operatives involved in laundering millions of euros in South American drug money to Europe and Lebanon. One of the operatives arrested was Hassan Tarabolsi, a German citizen who manages a worldwide money laundering business. Tarabolsi represents the close connection between the criminal operation and the leaders of Hezbollah.

=== India ===
India has campaigned for linking of the IMF's macroprudential regulation and lending policies with key provisions of FATF's anti-money laundering (AML) and countering financing of terrorism (CFT) to enhance its IMF member nation's compliance on these issues which cause a threat to the global economy. India also seeks to link these IMF policies with secrecy jurisdictions, cyber risks and tax havens.

=== Spain ===
In February 2019, the Spanish Treasury, through the Commission for the Prevention of Money Laundering and Monetary Offences (SEPBLAC), published their strategy for preventing the financing of terrorism.

=== United Kingdom ===
In the UK, the Prevention of Terrorism (Temporary Provisions) Act 1989, put in place in 1989, helped to prevent the financing of terrorism. This was more so to help shut down the funding of the Republican and Loyalist paramilitaries in Northern Ireland. Income sources for the Irish Republican and Loyalist paramilitaries came from gambling machines, cab companies and charitable donations in Northern Ireland, which provided the overwhelming bulk of revenue in the Troubles (1969–1998).

=== Republic of Ireland ===
The Offences against the State Acts 1939–1998 criminalises many actions deemed detrimental to the security of the Republic of Ireland. An organisation can be made subject to a suppression order under the act, after which being a member of or directing or fundraising the activities of such an unlawful organisation becomes an offence. During the Troubles (1969–1998), the Provisional Irish Republican Army (PIRA) and the Irish National Liberation Army (INLA) were proscribed under these measures.

However, during the conflict, the Republic of Ireland was a primary source of funds, arms (mostly IEDs of Irish origin), training camps, bomb factories, and safe houses for the Irish Republican cause more than any other group or nation on earth in the conflict. Overseas donations, including $12 million in cash from Libyan leader Muammar Gaddafi and $3.6 million raised by NORAID in America for the Republican cause (but not necessarily directly to the IRA coffers), were often overexaggerated and actually really small. Most or nearly all of the revenue for the IRA came from legitimate and criminal activities within Ireland such as protection rackets, bank robberies, black taxies, fraud, and money laundering, all of which contributed to the longevity of the conflict as it enabled the group to buy enough guns and explosives.

=== Supranational organizations ===
==== European Union ====
European Union has undertaken several actions against money laundering and terror funding. This includes the production of the following reports and implementation of their corresponding recommendations: Supranational Risk Assessment Report (SNRA), a Report on publicly known anti-money laundering cases involving EU banks, Financial Intelligence Unit (FIU) report, and interconnection of central bank account registries.

==== United Nations ====
United Nations Security Council Resolution 1373 is a counter-terrorism measure intended to deny financing to terrorist organisations and individuals.

Article 2.1 of the 1999 Terrorist Financing Convention defines the crime of terrorist financing as the offense committed by "any person" who "by any means, directly or indirectly, unlawfully and willfully, provides or collects funds with the intention that they should be used or in the knowledge that they are to be used, in full or in part, in order to carry out" an act "intended to cause death or serious bodily injury to a civilian, or to any other person not taking an active part in the hostilities in a situation of armed conflict, when the purpose of such act, by its nature or context, is to intimidate a population, or to compel a government or an international organization to do or to abstain from doing any act."

The UN Security Council adopted Resolution 1373 after the 9/11 attacks. This outlined that states were not allowed to provide financing to terrorist organizations, allow safe havens to them and that information regarding terrorist groups had to be shared with other governments.

A committee was formed in the United Nations that were in charge of gathering a list of organizations and people who had ties with terrorism or were suspected of terrorism whose financial accounts needed to be frozen and that no financial institutes would be able to do trade with them.

== Bitcoin ==
In January 2019, the military wing of Hamas, known as the al-Qassam Brigades, began a campaign to get supporters to donate USD. Soon after announcing its intention to crowdfund through Bitcoin, the al-Qassam Brigades provided a Bitcoin address to which donors could send funds and posted infographics and tutorials about Bitcoin on social media.

Since then Hamas has used Bitcoin and other cryptocurrencies but reports claim the amounts are smaller when compared to its traditional funding sources and are often traceable due to blockchain transparency. Authorities in the U.S. and Israel have repeatedly seized millions in crypto tied to Hamas and related exchanges, most recently targeting BuyCash and confiscating funds raised after the October 2023 attacks. These cases have fueled regulatory crackdowns, lawsuits against crypto platforms like Binance, and proposals to treat crypto mixers as national security threats.

== See also ==
- Alms for Jihad
- Cryptocurrency and crime
- Finances of the Islamic State
- Funding Evil
- List of charities accused of ties to terrorism
- Money laundering
