= Money laundering =

Process of concealing the origin of money

Placing "dirty" money in a service company, where it is layered with legitimate income and then integrated into the flow of money, is a common form of money laundering.

Money laundering is the process of illegally concealing the origin of money obtained from illicit activities (often known as dirty money), and converting the funds into a seemingly legitimate source. As financial crime has become more complex and financial intelligence is more important in combating international crime and terrorism, money laundering has become the subject of prominent political, economic, and legal debate. Most countries implement some anti-money-laundering measures.

In the past, the term "money laundering" was applied only to financial transactions related to organized crime. Today its definition is often expanded by government and international regulators such as the US Office of the Comptroller of the Currency to mean "any financial transaction which generates an asset or a value as the result of an illegal act", which may involve actions such as tax evasion or false accounting. In the UK, it does not need to involve money, but any economic good. Courts have characterized as money laundering acts of financial crimes committed by private individuals, drug dealers, businesses, corrupt officials, members of criminal organizations such as the Mafia, and even states.

In United States law, money laundering is the practice of engaging in financial transactions to conceal the identity, source, or destination of illegally gained money. In United Kingdom law, the common law definition is wider. The act is defined as "the process by which the proceeds of crime are converted into assets which appear to have a legitimate origin, so that they can be retained permanently or recycled into further criminal enterprises".

== Legislative history ==
While existing laws were used to fight money laundering during the period of Prohibition in the United States during the 1930s, dedicated anti-money laundering legislation was only implemented in the 1980s. Organized crime received a boost from Prohibition and a large source of new funds that were obtained from illegal sales of alcohol. The successful prosecution of Al Capone on tax evasion brought in a new emphasis by the state and law enforcement agencies to track and confiscate money, but existing laws against tax evasion could not be used once gangsters started paying their taxes.

In the 1980s, the war on drugs led governments again to turn to money laundering rules in an attempt to track and seize the proceeds of drug crimes in order to catch the organizers and individuals running drug empires. It also had the benefit, from a law enforcement point of view, of turning rules of evidence "upside down". Law enforcers normally have to prove an individual is guilty to seize their property, but with civil forfeiture laws, money can be confiscated and it is up to the individual to prove that the source of funds is legitimate to get the money back.

However, this process has been abused by some law enforcement agencies to take and keep money without strong evidence of related criminal activity, to be used to supplement their own budgets. Civil asset forfeiture has been harshly criticized by civil liberties advocates for its greatly reduced standards for conviction, reverse onus, financial conflicts of interests arising when the law enforcement agencies who decide whether or not to seize assets stand to keep those assets for themselves, and violation of separation of powers and due process.

The 11 September attacks in 2001, which led to the Patriot Act in the U.S. and similar legislation worldwide, led to a new emphasis on money laundering laws to combat terrorism financing. The Group of Seven (G7) nations used the Financial Action Task Force on Money Laundering to put pressure on governments around the world to increase surveillance and monitoring of financial transactions and share this information between countries. Starting in 2002, governments around the world upgraded money laundering laws and surveillance and monitoring systems of financial transactions. Anti-money laundering regulations have become a much larger burden for financial institutions, and enforcement has stepped up significantly.

During 2011–2015 a number of major banks faced ever-increasing fines for breaches of money laundering regulations. This included HSBC, which was fined $1.9 billion in December 2012, and BNP Paribas, which was fined $8.9 billion in July 2014 by the U.S. government. Many countries introduced or strengthened border controls on the amount of cash that can be carried and introduced central transaction reporting systems where all financial institutions have to report all financial transactions electronically. For example, in 2006, Australia set up the AUSTRAC system and required the reporting of all financial transactions.

With the surge in digital assets in the late 2010s, there has been a noticeable rise in money laundering and fraud tied to cryptocurrency. In 2021 alone, cybercriminals managed to secure US$14 billion in cryptocurrency through various illicit activities. It has been suggested that the expansion of the cryptocurrency trading created new avenues for "secrecy-seeking capital" from the 2010s onward, when money laundering and tax evasion through tax haven jurisdictions became more difficult, following various international policy initiatives for example within the OECD and the European Union.

Chinese organized criminal groups have become the principal money launderers for drug cartels in Mexico, Italy, and elsewhere. In the U.S., Chinese money laundering networks were associated with over US$312 billion in suspicious transactions from 2020 to 2024, according to the Financial Crimes Enforcement Network.

The East and Southeast Asia regions have become areas of major concern for money laundering. The United Nations Office on Drugs and Crime noted in a 2019 transnational organized crime assessment that threats arising from organized crime in Southeast Asia were becoming more deeply integrated within the region itself, as well as with neighboring and connected regions. As the region's illicit economies expanded and evolved, including the growth of the synthetic drug industry, casinos and economic zones in the region's border areas became important hubs for money laundering. Sites such as the Golden Triangle Special Economic Zone in Laos have been identified as hotspots for money laundering and various other types of transnational crime.

Other high risk sectors for money laundering include commercial banks, securities companies, currency exchange shops, money transfer service providers, insurance companies, real estate agencies, and the trade in valuable materials such as art, antiquities and wildlife products. As these industries have grown, the presence and sophistication of money laundering operations has too, creating a backdoor for organized crime to launder illicit funds into the global financial system.

Casino junkets operating from Macao emerged as a major facilitator of money laundering, as has the more recently established online gambling industry. The rise of the cyber-enabled fraud industry across Southeast Asia, especially in Cambodia, Myanmar, Laos, and the Philippines, has given rise to new platforms providing guarantees and facilitating the laundering of funds through app-based channels. One such case is that of Huione, a Cambodia-based operation that blockchain analysis firms have identified as one of the leading actors in this space. Blockchain analytics firm Elliptic described Huione as the "largest illicit online marketplace to have ever operated". Global law enforcement has begun to respond to the threats posed by such platforms, and in May 2025 the U.S. Department of the Treasury's Financial Crimes Enforcement Network (FinCEN) issued a finding and notice of proposed rulemaking (NPRM) pursuant to Section 311 of the USA PATRIOT Act that identified Huione Group as a financial institution of primary money laundering concern, seeking to sever its access to the U.S. financial system. Reuters identified Cambodian businessman Hun To, cousin of Prime Minister Hun Manet, as one of the directors of Huione Pay.

== Features ==
=== Definition ===
Money laundering is the conversion or transfer of property; the concealment or disguising of the nature of the proceeds; the acquisition, possession or use of property, knowing that these are derived from criminal acts; the participating in or assisting the movement of funds to make the proceeds appear legitimate.

Money obtained from crime, such as extortion, insider trading, drug trafficking, human trafficking, and illegal gambling, is "dirty" and needs to be "cleaned" to appear to have been derived from legal activities, so that banks and other financial institutions will deal with it without suspicion. Money can be laundered by many methods that vary in complexity and sophistication.

Money laundering typically involves three steps: The first involves introducing cash into the financial system by some means ("placement"); the second involves carrying out complex financial transactions to camouflage the illegal source of the cash ("layering"); and finally, acquiring wealth generated from the transactions of the illicit funds ("integration"). Some of these steps may be omitted, depending on the circumstances. For example, non-cash proceeds that are already in the financial system would not need to be placed.

According to the United States Treasury Department:

Money laundering is the process of making illegally-gained proceeds (i.e., "dirty money") appear legal (i.e., "clean"). Typically, it involves three steps: placement, layering, and integration. First, the illegitimate funds are furtively introduced into the legitimate financial system. Then, the money is moved around to create confusion, sometimes by wiring or transferring through numerous accounts. Finally, it is integrated into the financial system through additional transactions until the "dirty money" appears "clean".

=== Methods ===
==== List of methods ====
Money laundering can take several forms, although most methodologies can be categorized into one of a few types. These include "bank methods, smurfing [also known as structuring], currency exchanges, and double-invoicing".

- Structuring: Often known as smurfing, is a method of placement whereby cash is broken into smaller deposits of money, used to defeat suspicion of money laundering and to avoid anti-money laundering reporting requirements. A sub-component of this is to use smaller amounts of cash to purchase bearer instruments, such as money orders, and then ultimately deposit those, again in small amounts.
- Bulk cash smuggling: This involves physically smuggling cash to another jurisdiction and depositing it in a financial institution, such as an offshore bank, that offers greater bank secrecy or less rigorous money laundering enforcement.
- Cash-intensive businesses: In this method, a business that is typically expected to receive a large proportion of its revenue as cash uses its accounts to deposit criminally derived cash. This method of money laundering often causes organized crime and corporate crime to overlap. Such enterprises often operate openly and in doing so generate cash revenue from incidental legitimate business in addition to the illicit cash. In such cases, the business will usually claim all cash received as legitimate earnings. Service businesses are best suited to this method, as such enterprises have little or no variable costs and/or a large ratio between revenue and variable costs, which makes it difficult to detect discrepancies between revenues and costs. Examples are parking structures, strip clubs, tanning salons, car washes, arcades, bars, restaurants, casinos, barber shops, DVD stores, movie theaters, and beach resorts.
- Trade-based laundering: This method is one of the newest and most complex forms of money laundering. This involves under- or over-valuing invoices to disguise the movement of money. For example, the art market has been accused of being an ideal vehicle for money laundering due to several unique aspects of art such as the subjective value of artworks as well as the secrecy of auction houses about the identity of the buyer and seller. According to the National Crime Agency, one strategy that is favored by high-net-worth individuals is specialist storage facilities. Art kept in these spaces has been used by individuals to evade sanctions and launder the proceeds of crime.
- Shell companies and trusts: Trusts and shell companies disguise the true owners of money. Trusts and corporate vehicles, depending on the jurisdiction, need not disclose the company owner.
- Round-tripping: Here, money is deposited in a controlled foreign corporation offshore, preferably in a tax haven, and then shipped back as a foreign direct investment, exempt from taxation.
- Bank capture: In this case, money launderers or criminals buy a controlling interest in a bank, preferably in a jurisdiction with weak money laundering controls, and then move money through the bank without scrutiny.
- Casinos: In this method, an individual walks into a casino and buys chips with illicit cash. The individual will then play for a relatively short time. When the person cashes in the chips, they will expect to take payment in a check, or at least get a receipt so they can claim the proceeds as gambling winnings.
- Other gambling: Money is spent on gambling, preferably on high odds games. One way to minimize risk with this method is to bet on every possible outcome of some event that has many possible outcomes, so no outcome(s) have short odds, and the bettor will lose only the vigorish and will have one or more winning bets that can be shown as the source of money. The losing bets will remain hidden.
- Black salaries: A company may have unregistered employees without written contracts and pay them cash salaries. Dirty money might be used to pay them.
- Tax amnesties: For example, those that legalize unreported assets and cash in tax havens.
- Transaction Laundering: When a merchant unknowingly processes illicit credit card transactions for another business. It is a growing problem and recognised as distinct from traditional money laundering in using the payments ecosystem to hide that the transaction even occurred (e.g. the use of fake front websites). Also known as "undisclosed aggregation" or "factoring".
- Online job marketplaces such as Freelancer.com and Fiverr, which accept funds from clients and hold them in escrow to pay freelancers. A money launderer can post a token job on one of these sites, and send the money for the site to hold in escrow. The launderer (or his associate) can then sign on as a freelancer (using a different account and IP address), accept and complete the job, and be paid the funds.
- Through sports: Investigation teams have identified sport profits as a common way to launder money. In Latin America, in particular, drug traffickers are frequently found to own Soccer Clubs, and to launder money through their intermediate, by buying and selling players, selling tickets and merchandise.

==== Digital electronic money ====
In theory, electronic money should provide as easy a method of transferring value without revealing identity as untracked banknotes, especially wire transfers involving anonymity-protecting numbered bank accounts. In practice, however, the record-keeping capabilities of Internet service providers and other network resource maintainers tend to frustrate that intention. While some cryptocurrencies under recent development have aimed to provide more possibilities of transaction anonymity for various reasons, the degree to which they succeed — and, in consequence, the degree to which they offer benefits for money laundering efforts — is controversial. Solutions such as ZCash and Monero ― known as privacy coins ― are examples of cryptocurrencies that provide unlinkable anonymity via proofs and/or obfuscation of information (ring signatures). While not suitable for large-scale crimes, privacy coins like Monero are suitable for laundering money made through small-scale crimes.

Apart from traditional cryptocurrencies, Non-Fungible Tokens (NFTs) are also commonly used in connection with money laundering activities. NFTs are often used to perform Wash Trading by creating several different wallets for one individual, generating several fictitious sales and consequently selling the respective NFT to a third party. According to a report by Chainalysis, these types of wash trades are becoming increasingly popular among money launderers especially due to the largely anonymous nature of transactions on NFT marketplaces. Auction platforms for NFT sales may face regulatory pressure to comply with anti-money laundering legislation.

Additionally, cryptocurrency mixers have been increasingly used by cybercriminals over the past decade to launder funds. A mixer blends the cryptocurrencies of many users together to obfuscate the origins and owners of funds, enabling a greater degree of privacy on public blockchains like Bitcoin and Ethereum. Although not explicitly illegal in many jurisdictions, the legality of mixers is controversial. The use of the mixer Tornado Cash in the laundering of funds stolen by the DPRK-associated Lazarus Group led the Office of Foreign Assets Control to sanction it, prompting some users to sue the Treasury Department. Proponents have argued mixers allow users to protect their privacy and that the government lacks the authority to restrict access to decentralized software. In the United States, FinCEN requires mixers to register as money service businesses.

In 2013, Jean-Loup Richet, a research fellow at ESSEC ISIS, surveyed new techniques that cybercriminals were using in a report written for the United Nations Office on Drugs and Crime. A common approach was to use a digital currency exchanger service which converted dollars into a digital currency called Liberty Reserve, and could be sent and received anonymously. The receiver could convert the Liberty Reserve currency back into cash for a small fee. In May 2013, the US authorities shut down Liberty Reserve, charging its founder and various others with money laundering.

Another increasingly common way of laundering money is to use online gaming. In a growing number of online games, such as Second Life and World of Warcraft, it is possible to convert money into virtual goods, services, or virtual cash that can later be converted back into money.

To avoid the usage of decentralized digital money such as Bitcoin for the profit of crime and corruption, Australia is planning to strengthen the nation's anti-money laundering laws. The characteristics of Bitcoin—it is completely deterministic, protocol-based and can be difficult to censor—make it possible to circumvent national laws using services like Tor to obfuscate transaction origins. Bitcoin relies completely on cryptography, not on a central entity running under a KYC framework. There are several cases in which criminals have cashed out a significant amount of Bitcoin after ransomware attacks, drug dealings, cyber fraud and gunrunning. However, many digital currency exchanges are now operating KYC programs under threat of regulation from the jurisdictions they operate.

==== Reverse money laundering ====
Reverse money laundering is a process that disguises a legitimate source of funds that are to be used for illegal purposes. It is usually perpetrated for the purpose of financing terrorism but can be also used by criminal organizations that have invested in legal businesses and would like to withdraw legitimate funds from official circulation. Unaccounted cash received via disguising financial transactions is not included in official financial reporting and could be used to evade taxes, hand in bribes and pay "under-the-table" salaries. For example, in an affidavit filed on 24 March 2014 in United States District Court, Northern California, San Francisco Division, FBI special agent Emmanuel V. Pascua alleged that several people associated with the Chee Kung Tong organization, and California State Senator Leland Yee, engaged in reverse money laundering activities.

The problem of such fraudulent encashment practices (obnalichka in Russian) has become acute in Russia and other countries of the former Soviet Union. The Eurasian Group on Combating Money Laundering and Financing of Terrorism (EAG) reported that the Russian Federation, Ukraine, Turkey, Serbia, Kyrgyzstan, Uzbekistan, Armenia and Kazakhstan have encountered a substantial shrinkage of tax base and shifting money supply balance in favor of cash. These processes have complicated the planning and management of the economy and contributed to the growth of the shadow economy.

=== Magnitude ===
Many regulatory and governmental authorities issue estimates each year for the amount of money laundered, either worldwide or within their national economy. In 1996, a spokesperson for the IMF estimated that 2–5% of the worldwide global economy involved laundered money. The Financial Action Task Force on Money Laundering (FATF), an intergovernmental body set up to combat money laundering, stated, "Due to the illegal nature of the transactions, precise statistics are not available and it is therefore impossible to produce a definitive estimate of the amount of money that is globally laundered every year. The FATF therefore does not publish any figures in this regard." Academic commentators have likewise been unable to estimate the volume of money with any degree of assurance. Various estimates of the scale of global money laundering are sometimes repeated often enough to make some people regard them as factual—but no researcher has overcome the inherent difficulty of measuring an actively concealed practice.

Regardless of the difficulty in measurement, the amount of money laundered each year is in the billions of US dollars and poses a significant policy concern for governments. As a result, governments and international bodies have undertaken efforts to deter, prevent, and apprehend money launderers. Financial institutions have likewise undertaken efforts to prevent and detect transactions involving dirty money, both as a result of government requirements and to avoid the reputational risk involved. Issues relating to money laundering have existed as long as there have been large-scale criminal enterprises. Modern anti-money laundering laws have developed along with the modern war on drugs. In more recent times anti-money laundering legislation is seen as an adjunct to the financial crime of terrorist financing in that both crimes usually involve the transmission of funds through the financial system (although money laundering relates to where the money has come from, and terrorist financing relating to where the money is going to). Finally, people, vessels, organisations and governments can be sanctioned due to international law-breaking, war (and of course tit-for-tat sanctions), and still want to move funds into markets where they are persona non grata.

Transaction laundering is a massive and growing problem. Finextra estimated that transaction laundering accounted for over $200 billion in the US in 2017 alone, with over $6 billion of these sales involving illicit goods or services, sold by nearly 335,000 unregistered merchants. Money laundering can erode democracy.

== Notable cases ==
1998 investigation, United States Senate, Contribution Laundering/Third-Party Transfers. Includes investigation of Gandhi Memorial International Foundation.

- Bank of Credit and Commerce International: Unknown amount, estimated in billions, of criminal proceeds, including drug trafficking money, laundered during the mid-1980s.
- Bank of New York: US$7 billion of Russian capital flight laundered through accounts controlled by bank executives, the late 1990s.
- BNP Paribas, in June 2014, pleaded guilty to falsifying business records and conspiracy, having violated U.S. sanctions against Cuba, Iran, and Sudan. It agreed to pay an $8.9 billion fine, the largest ever for violating U.S. sanctions.
- BSI Bank, in May 2017, was shut down by the Monetary Authority of Singapore for serious breaches of anti-money laundering requirements, poor management oversight of the bank's operations, and gross misconduct of some of the bank's staff.
- BTA Bank: $6 billion of bank funds embezzled or fraudulently loaned to shell companies and offshore holdings by the bank's former chairman and CEO Mukhtar Ablyazov.
- Charter House Bank: Charter House Bank in Kenya was placed under statutory management in 2006 by the Central Bank of Kenya after it was discovered the bank was being used for money laundering activities by multiple accounts containing missing customer information. More than $1.5 billion had been laundered before the scam was uncovered.
- Danske Bank + Swedbank: $30 billion – $230 billion US dollars laundered through its Estonian branch. This was revealed on 19 September 2018. Investigations by Denmark, Estonia, the U.K. and the U.S. were joined by France in February 2019. On 19 February 2019, Danske Bank announced that it would cease operating in Russia and the Baltic States. This statement came shortly after Estonia's banking regulator Finantsinspektsioon announced that they would close the Estonian branch of Danske Bank. The investigation has grown to include Swedbank, which may have laundered $4.3 billion. More at Danske Bank money laundering scandal.
- Deutsche Bank was accused in a vast money laundering scheme, dubbed the Global Laundromat, involving secret Russian accounts that were transferred from European Union banks in Estonia, Latvia and Cyprus between 2010 and 2014. Newspaper sources estimated the total value of laundered currency to be as high as $80bn. The bank is also under investigation for its involvement in Europe's biggest banking scandal through Denmark's Danske Bank, which laundered €200bn, also from Russian sources.
- United Arab Emirates' Dubai Islamic Bank was accused of "knowingly and purposefully" providing "financial services and other forms of material support to al-Qaeda operatives" when the terrorist group was planning the execution of the 11 September attacks against the United States. In addition, the Sharjah branch of Standard Chartered Bank was also involved in opening the accounts of the terror operatives and allowing financial transactions to take place between them and Khalid Sheikh Mohammed, "the principal architect of the 9/11 attacks".
- FinCEN Files: On 21 September 2020, The International Consortium of Investigative Journalists (ICIJ) revealed FinCEN Files, about the involvement of about $2tn of transactions by some of the world's biggest banks. FinCEN files also revealed that Dubai-based Gunes General Trading, based in Dubai funneled Iranian state money via UAE's central banking system and processed $142 million in 2011 and 2012.
- Fortnite: In 2018, Cybersecurity firm Sixgill discovered that stolen credit card details may be used to purchase Fortnite's in-game currency (V-Bucks) and in-game purchases, for the account to then be sold online for "clean" money. Epic Games, the makers of Fortnite, responded by urging customers to secure their accounts.
- HSBC, in December 2012, paid a record $1.9 billion fine for money-laundering hundreds of millions of dollars for drug traffickers, terrorists and sanctioned governments such as Iran. The money-laundering occurred throughout the 2000s.
- Institute for the Works of Religion: Italian authorities investigated suspected money laundering transactions amounting to US$218 million made by the IOR to several Italian banks.
- Liberty Reserve, in May 2013, was seized by United States federal authorities for laundering $6 billion.
- Nauru: US$70 billion of Russian capital flight was laundered through unregulated Nauruan offshore shell banks in the late 1990s
- Sani Abacha: US$2–5 billion of government assets laundered through banks in the UK, Luxembourg, Jersey (Channel Islands), and Switzerland, by the president of Nigeria.
- Standard Bank: Standard Bank South Africa London Branch – The Financial Conduct Authority (FCA) has fined Standard Bank PLC (Standard Bank) £7,640,400 for failings relating to its anti-money laundering (AML) policies and procedures over corporate and private bank customers connected to politically exposed persons (PEPs).
- Standard Chartered: paid $330 million in fines for money-laundering hundreds of billions of dollars for Iran. The money-laundering took place in the 2000s and occurred for "nearly a decade to hide 60,000 transactions worth $250 billion".
- TD Bank: In 2024, two TD Bank units pleaded guilty to US criminal charges that included conspiracy to launder money. They agreed to pay $3 billion in combined penalties. US authorities said the bank had left more than $18 trillion in customer activity unmonitored for about a decade, which allowed three money-laundering networks to move illicit funds through its accounts.
- Westpac: On 24 September 2020, Westpac and AUSTRAC agreed to an AUD $1.3 billion penalty over Westpac's breaches of the Anti-Money Laundering and Counter-Terrorism Financing Act 2006 - the largest fine ever issued in Australian corporate history.

=== Individuals ===
- Jose Franklin Jurado-Rodriguez, a Harvard University and Columbia University Graduate School of Arts and Sciences Economics Department alumnus, was convicted in Luxembourg in June 1990 "in what was one of the largest drug money laundering cases ever brought in Europe" and the US in 1996 of money laundering for the Cali Cartel kingpin Jose Santacruz Londono. Jurado-Rodriguez specialized in "smurfing".
- Ng Lap Seng: The Chinese billionaire real estate developer from Macau was sentenced to four years in prison in May 2018 for bribing two diplomats, including the former president of the United Nations General Assembly, John William Ashe, to help him build a conference center in Macau for the United Nations Office for South-South Cooperation (UNOSSC), headed by Director Yiping Zhou. The corruption case was the worst financial scandal for the United Nations since the abuse of the Iraqi oil-for-food program more than 20 years ago. Ng Lap Seng, 69, was convicted in Federal District Court in Manhattan on two counts of violating the Foreign Corrupt Practices Act, one count of paying bribes, one count of money laundering, and two counts of conspiracy.
- Ferdinand Marcos: Unknown amount, estimated at US$10 billion of government assets laundered through banks and financial institutions in the United States, Liechtenstein, Austria, Panama, Netherlands Antilles, Cayman Islands, Vanuatu, Hong Kong, Singapore, Monaco, the Bahamas, the Vatican and Switzerland.
- Damien Carew: An Australian businessman who has been investigated by French authorities in connection with an alleged international money-laundering operation. In 2021, Carew was found in Paris carrying approximately €195,000 in cash, with investigators subsequently discovering a further €160,000 at his accommodation. French investigators have alleged that he handled more than €3 million during 2021 through transactions involving cash, cryptocurrency and gold. Carew has faced charges of aggravated money laundering in France; the money-laundering investigation has been reported as ongoing.

== Prevention ==
=== Laws by country ===
==== India ====
The Prevention of Money Laundering Act of 2002, and the Bharatiya Nyaya Sanhita of 2023 make money-laundering a punishable offence.

==== Australia ====
Introduced the Anti-Money Laundering and Counter-Terrorism Financing Act (AML/CTF Act) to regulate financial transactions and enhance transparency.

==== Canada ====
In 2000, the Proceeds of Crime (Money Laundering) Act was enacted, which established the Financial Transactions and Reports Analysis Centre of Canada (FINTRAC).

==== United Kingdom ====
The United Kingdom implemented the Proceeds of Crime Act of 2002 (POCA) to establish money laundering offenses and facilitate asset recovery.

==== United States ====
The Corporate Transparency Act (CTA) was enacted to require companies to disclose their beneficial owners to the Financial Crimes Enforcement Network (FinCEN), effectively reducing the number of shell corporations and enhancing transparency in corporate ownership.

==== Singapore ====
Singapore established the Corruption, Drug Trafficking and Other Serious Crimes (Confiscation of Benefits) Act to confiscate proceeds from serious crimes.

==== Switzerland ====
Switzerland strengthened its anti-money laundering framework through the Swiss Anti-Money Laundering Act (AMLA), which mandates due diligence and reporting requirements for financial institutions. Estate agents have been subject to the Anti-Money Laundering Act since 1 October 2026.

== Statistics ==
Below table shows the annual reported money laundering cases per 100,000 population for individual countries for the last available year according to the United Nations Office on Drugs and Crime. Proportion of unreported money laundering and definition of money laundering might differ between countries.

Country	Reported money laundering cases per 100,000	Year
Albania	15.1	2024
Antigua and Barbuda	0.0	2024
Armenia	2.0	2024
Austria	9.7	2024
Azerbaijan	0.3	2024
Bahamas	5.0	2022
Barbados	2.8	2022
Belgium	41.7	2024
Belize	0.0	2020
Bhutan	0.0	2020
Bolivia	0.9	2022
Bosnia and Herzegovina	3.3	2024
Botswana	0.8	2020
Brazil	0.3	2024
Bulgaria	0.8	2024
Canada	0.5	2024
Chile	0.0	2022
Colombia	1.4	2024
Costa Rica	3.9	2024
Croatia	3.6	2024
Czech Republic	12.5	2024
Denmark	44.5	2024
Djibouti	0.0	2018
Dominica	0.0	2024
Dominican Republic	0.1	2016
Ecuador	0.5	2024
El Salvador	0.4	2022
England and Wales	0.0	2016
Estonia	1.4	2024
Finland	25.3	2024
France	5.8	2024
Germany	44.5	2024
Greece	1.5	2024
Grenada	35.1	2022
Guatemala	2.2	2024
Guyana	0.0	2024
Honduras	1.0	2024
Hong Kong	13.6	2022
Hungary	13.1	2024
Iceland	53.1	2024
Indonesia	0.0	2024
Ireland	11.6	2024
Italy	3.2	2024
Japan	1.0	2024
Kosovo	0.2	2020
Kyrgyzstan	0.1	2017
Latvia	15.1	2024
Lebanon	0.6	2015
Liechtenstein	180.6	2024
Lithuania	2.7	2024
Macau	4.2	2024
Malta	11.9	2024
Mexico	0.5	2024
Moldova	1.4	2024
Monaco	126.1	2016
Mongolia	0.3	2024
Montenegro	2.2	2024
Morocco	1.3	2022
Myanmar	0.0	2022
Netherlands	8.1	2024
New Zealand	29.3	2018
North Macedonia	0.4	2024
Norway	6.9	2024
Oman	0.2	2022
Palestine	0.3	2022
Panama	2.1	2024
Paraguay	0.5	2024
Poland	3.9	2024
Portugal	1.3	2024
Puerto Rico	2.8	2017
Romania	1.5	2024
Russia	1.6	2020
Saint Kitts and Nevis	2.1	2024
Scotland	1.4	2018
Senegal	0.1	2016
Serbia	1.6	2024
Singapore	2.9	2024
Slovakia	1.2	2024
Slovenia	14.6	2024
Spain	1.7	2024
Sri Lanka	0.1	2018
St. Vincent and Grenadines	0.0	2024
Sweden	179.3	2024
Switzerland	64.5	2024
Syria	0.0	2018
Thailand	2.3	2024
Trinidad and Tobago	0.8	2020
Turkey	1.4	2014
Ukraine	0.4	2020
United Arab Emirates	3.5	2022
Vatican City	605.4	2024
Venezuela	2.0	2018

== See also ==
- Anti-Money Laundering Act (Switzerland)
- Anti–money laundering framework for financial institutions in France
- Azerbaijani laundromat
- Bank Secrecy Act
- Danske Bank money laundering scandal
- Financial Action Task Force
- Gold laundering
- Operation Greenback
- Reputation laundering
