= Escrow.com =

Online payment company

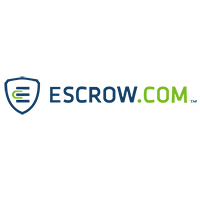
- Company type: Private
- Founded: 1999; 27 years ago
- Headquarters: San Francisco, CA
- Key people: Matt Barrie, President and CEO; Neil Katz, CFO; Owen Smith, Head of Compliance
- Services: Online Escrow
- Website: www.escrow.com

Escrow.com is a privately held internet escrow company. Based in San Francisco, CA, Escrow.com was founded in 1999 by Fidelity National Financial. It was acquired in 2015 by Freelancer.com.

== History ==
Escrow.com was founded in 1999 by Fidelity National Financial in response to Bank of America's four million dollar purchase a few years earlier of Loans.com. Fidelity decided to liquidate Escrow.com and did so in 2002 in a trade with iLumin for a software license. In 2004, Escrow.com was purchased by a private investor. Currently, the company is owned by Freelancer Technology Pty Limited.

== Overview ==
Escrow.com provides internet escrow services for many companies in e-commerce, international trade, online auctions, and online shopping, such as eBay, GoDaddy and AutoTrader. The items that are handled range from domain name sales to high monetary value items such as motor vehicles and heavy equipment/machinery. Escrow.com is a strategic partner with the United States Department of Commerce in support of President Obama’s National Export Initiative.

The company has been a guest blogger on ‘Tradeology’ – the official blog of the International Trade Administration as well as a featured writer in various magazines, including the Specialty Equipment Marketing Association (SEMA) News, EXPORT Magazine, and contributed towards having the term ‘Escrow Service' added to the third edition of the Trade Finance Guide, published by The International Trade Administration (ITA).

In 2013 Escrow.com reached an accrued value of over two billion dollars in transaction volume. The company works extensively in an effort to prevent online fraud and is a resource for the Internet Crime Complaint Center, a multi-agency task force made up by the Federal Bureau of Investigation (FBI), the National White Collar Crime Center (NW3C), and the Bureau of Justice Assistance (BJA)

== Services ==
The escrow company takes the buyer's funds, verifies the deposit to the seller, and transfers the funds to the seller after the buyer receives the merchandise, thus protecting the interests of both the buyer and seller.

- Vehicle Escrow: An escrow process that protects both buyers and sellers. It ensures the money is transferred and the vehicle is delivered with every sale.
- Domain and Website Escrow: An escrow process that ensures buyers get the domain or website and sellers get paid.
- Domain Name Holding Escrow: A service designed for domain name buyers and sellers who agree to hold the domain(s) in escrow while the buyer makes scheduled payments.
- General Merchandise Escrow: An escrow process used for almost any product that protects both buyers and sellers from fraud.
- Milestone Escrow: An escrow process where Escrow.com does not release payments to the seller until each phase/milestone has been completed and approved by the buyer.
- Broker Escrow: A three-party escrow transaction that offers brokers the ability to begin, manage and close transactions privately and in a secure manner.
- Trade Transaction Protection: An escrow process used for international trade that protects both exporters and importers from fraud.

== Licenses and partnerships ==
=== Licenses ===
State	License Type	Regulator
Arizona	Escrow	Arizona Department of Financial Institutions
Arkansas	Money Transmitter	Arkansas Securities Department
California	Escrow	California Department of Business Oversight
Colorado	Money Transmitter	Colorado Division of Banking
Georgia	Seller of Payment Instruments	Georgia Department of Banking and Finance - Non-Depository Financial Institutions Division
Idaho	Escrow	Idaho Department of Finance
Illinois	Money Transmitter	Illinois Department of Financial and Professional Regulation
Iowa	Money Transmitter	Iowa Division of Banking
Kansas	Money Transmitter	Kansas Office of the State Bank Commissioner
Maine	Money Transmitter	Department of Professional & Financial Regulation - Bureau of Consumer Credit Protection
Mississippi	Money Transmitter	Mississippi Department of Banking and Consumer Finance
Missouri	Sale of Checks	Missouri Division of Finance
Montana	Escrow	Montana Division of Banking and Financial Institutions
Nebraska	Money Transmitter	Nebraska Department of Banking & Finance
New Hampshire	Money Transmitter	State of New Hampshire Banking Department - Consumer Credit Division
New Mexico	Escrow	New Mexico Financial Institutions Division
North Carolina	Money Transmitter	North Carolina Office of the Commissioner of Banks
North Dakota	Money Transmitter	North Dakota Department of Financial Institutions - Consumer Division
Ohio	Money Transmitter	Ohio Department of Commerce Division of Financial Institutions
Oklahoma	Money Transmitter	Oklahoma Banking Department
South Dakota	Money Transmitter	South Dakota Division of Banking
Texas	Money Transmitter	Texas Department of Banking
Washington	Escrow	Washington Department of Financial Institutions
West Virginia	Money Transmitter	West Virginia Division of Banking

- Escrow.com has 42 financial services licenses granted or in-application

=== Partnerships ===
- National Independent Automobile Dealers Association
- Specialty Equipment Marketing Association (SEMA)
- eBay
- GoDaddy
- DomainNameSales.com
- United States Department of Commerce
- International Trade Administration
- United States Commercial Service
- BizBroker24.com
