= Sixgill =

Sixgill may refer to:

- Cybersixgill, Cybersixgill, an Israeli cyber intelligence company
- Sixgill stingray, a species of cartilaginous fish
- Sixgill sawshark, a species of shark
- Hexanchus, a genus of shark
