= Fly Like an Eagle =

Fly Like an Eagle may refer to:

== Music ==
- Fly Like an Eagle (album), 1976, by Steve Miller Band
  - "Fly Like an Eagle" (song), by Steve Miller Band
- "Fly Like an Eagle" (Stereophonics song), from Kind, 2019
- "Fly Like an Eagle", a song from The Marshall Tucker Band's 1977 album, Carolina Dreams
- "Fly Like an Eagle", a song from Ten's 1997 album The Robe
- "Fly Like an Eagle", a song from Respect (Shaquille O'Neal album), 1998

== Television ==
- "Fly Like an Eagle", a 1994 episode of Takin' Over the Asylum
- "Fly Like an Eagle", a 2015 episode of Lost in Transmission

== See also ==
- "Fly Like the Eagle", song by Agnetha Fältskog & Ola Håkansson from That's Me (album)
