= Ian Ippolito =

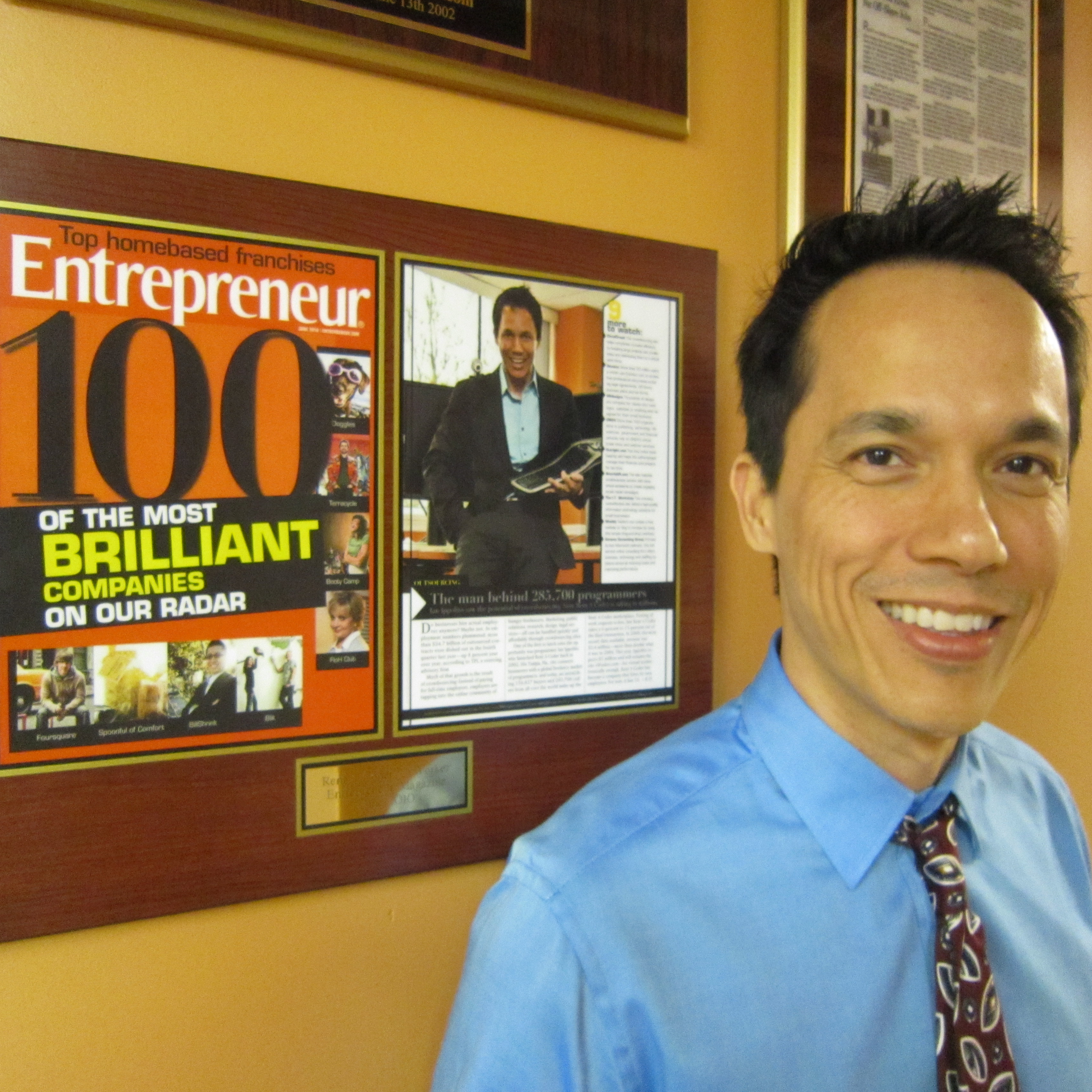
- Occupation: Entrepreneur
- Employer(s): Founder & CEO, Exhedra Solutions
- Known for: Founder of vWorker
- Spouse: Elise Gres
- Website: www.ianippolito.com

Ian Ippolito is an American serial entrepreneur and the founder of numerous tech companies. He is best known as the founder of vWorker (formerly called Rent a Coder), an online portal for outsourcing computer virtual work projects. vWorker was purchased by Freelancer.com in 2013 for an undisclosed price in the millions of dollars. Ippolito is also the founder of the first open-source website (Planet Source Code) and a financial investment site called The Real Estate Crowdfunding Review. As an entrepreneur, he has been featured in and provided commentary for numerous publications and media outlets including Forbes, Entrepreneur, The Wall Street Journal, as well as Fox and CBS News.

== Early life and education ==
Ippolito grew up in Merritt Island, Florida, home of Kennedy Space Center. His father was employed by NASA, first working in the Apollo control room and later as the director of the U.S. shuttle tracking station. Ippolito had his first entrepreneurial experience in the fifth grade, helping his mother sell Chinese food to raise money for his school. He initially attended Marquette University in Wisconsin before transferring to the University of Central Florida where he studied computer science. During his time in college, Ippolito read Unlimited Power by Tony Robbins, a book that he attributes to teaching him how to "set goals and develop mental discipline." After graduating from college, Ippolito moved to Tampa, Florida to take his first job.

== Career ==
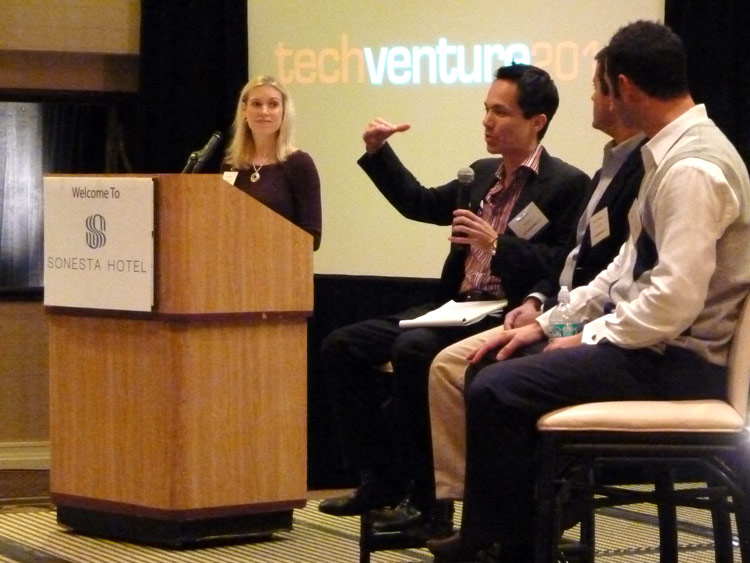
Ian Ippolito (second from left - speaking), Steve Tingiris, Jason Caras at a monetizing your business conference in 2010.

In 1997 Ippolito launched Planet Source Code, a website for sharing source code of computer programs. He launched the company after wanting to share his own source code, but was unable to find an online platform to do so. Ippolito used Visual InterDev (which later evolved into ASP.NET) to create the site. Planet Source Code is attributed as the first open-source site and grew in popularity, reaching 3 to 4 million page views per month prior to the burst of the dot-com bubble in 2001. Ippolito lost most of his site advertisers after the burst, and decided to create a new site for coders. As the webmaster for Planet Source Code, Ippolito received numerous requests from coders asking him to assist with their programming, but was too busy to help them himself. Ippolito saw the need created by demand and launched Rent a Coder in 2001, connecting coders from Planet Source Code with businesses looking for coders.

Ippolito included protection features for both employer and contractor on Rent a Coder. The website was the first online marketplace to do so with the use of escrow payments and arbitration for disputes. Every year from 2007 through 2010, Entrepreneur named Rent a Coder to the Inc. 5000 list of the fastest growing privately held companies in the United States. Ippolito changed the company name from Rent A Coder to vWorker (short for "virtual worker") in 2010. He grew vWorker into a 15 employee, $11.1 million yearly revenue business prior to selling the company.

In 2012, Ippolito sold vWorker to Freelancer.com for an amount reported by TechCrunch as being in the millions (US Dollars). At the time of the sale, it was the fourth largest freelance marketplace. After the sale, Ippolito took six months off before starting his next venture, a financial website called The Real Estate Crowdfunding Review.

In 2015, Ippolito was awarded the University of Central Florida Distinguished Alumni Award for Outstanding Professional Achievement.

Ippolito operates many of his ventures under the parent company Exhedra Solutions, founded by him and his two brothers in 1997. The company is headquartered in Tampa but also operates out of satellite offices in San Francisco, California and Pittsburgh, Pennsylvania. His work as an entrepreneur has also led to him appearing in major publications and media outlets including Forbes, Entrepreneur, The Wall Street Journal, Business Week, and Fast Company, as well as Fox and CBS News.

== Personal life ==
Ippolito is married to Elise Gres with whom he has one child. He proposed to her by taking her on a scavenger hunt he set up throughout the city of Tampa, leading to clues, presents, and eventually a diamond engagement ring. Ippolito also volunteers as a mentor for aspiring entrepreneurs and he and his wife donate to Feeding America Tampa Bay.
