= Anti-Money Laundering Act (Switzerland) =

Swiss law on money laundering

Anti-Money Laundering Act (AMLA)
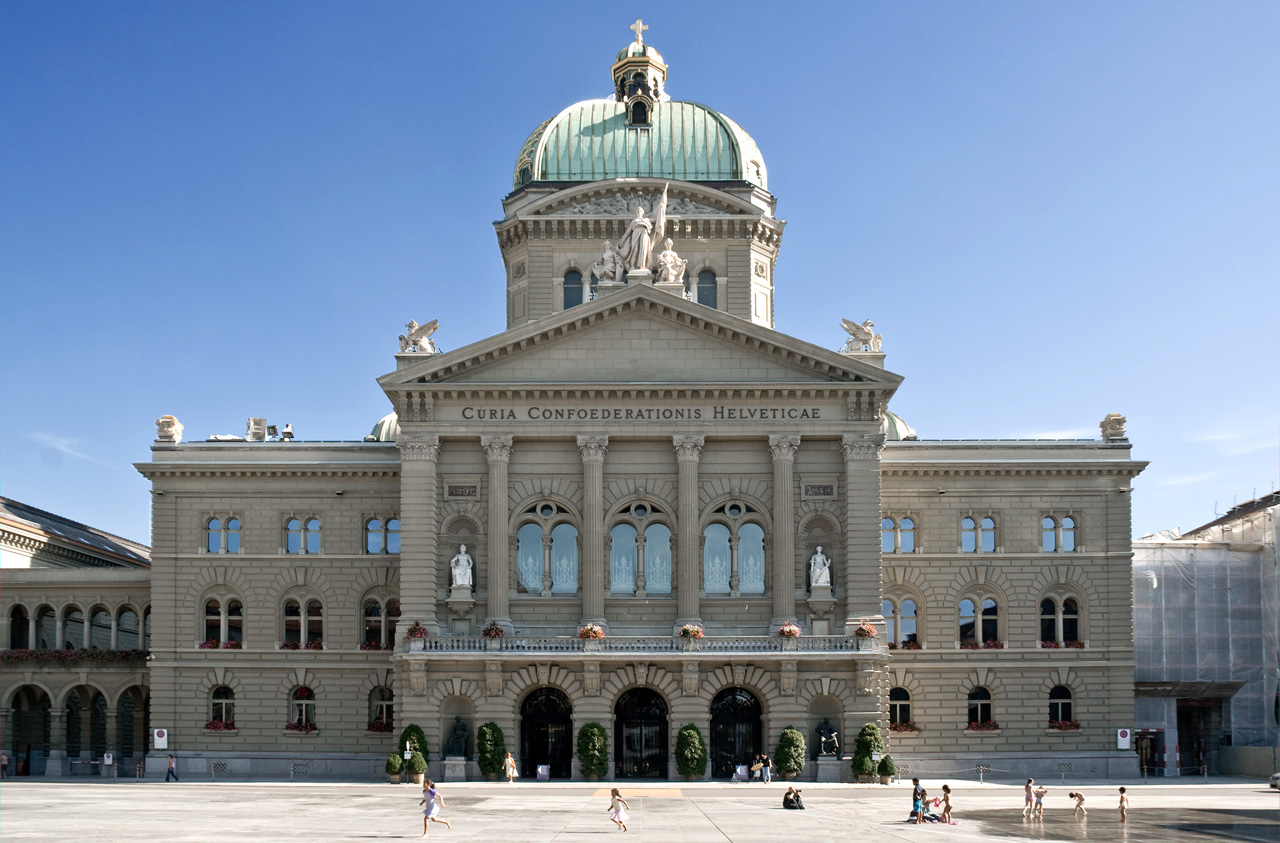

Federal Assembly of Switzerland
- Long title: Federal Act on Combating Money Laundering and Terrorist Financing (SR 955.0)
- Territorial extent: Switzerland
- Enacted by: Federal Assembly of Switzerland
- Enacted: 17 June 1996
- Commenced: 10 October 1997
- Status: Current legislation

The Anti-Money Laundering Act (AMLA) (German: Bundesgesetz über die Bekämpfung der Geldwäscherei und der Terrorismusfinanzierung, GwG, French: Loi fédérale du 10 octobre 1997 concernant la lutte contre le blanchiment d’argent dans le secteur financier, LBA, Italian: Legge federale relativa alla lotta contro il riciclaggio di denaro e il finanziamento del terrorismo, LRD), also referred to as the Federal Act on Combating Money Laundering and Terrorist Financing, is a Swiss federal act designed to combat money laundering by requiring financial intermediaries to be vigilant about the origin of funds.

== Purpose ==
The Anti-Money Laundering Act is designed to prevent members of mafia or terrorist organizations from gaining access to financial institutions. Under this law, financial institutions (banks, asset managers, investment companies, etc.) must, for example, withhold the names of beneficial owners from all transfers of value, pending investigation.

== Evolution ==
In March 2021, despite the international recommendation to combat corruption, parliament refused to include "advisors" (lawyers and trustees) under the Money Laundering Act, when they set up, manage or administer shell companies or trusts. Currently, advisors are only subject to the law when they have decision-making powers or hold a power of attorney for the bank account of an offshore structure (as they are then financial intermediaries). Estate agents have been subject to the Anti-Money Laundering Act since 1 October 2026.

== See also ==
- Crime in Switzerland
- Banking in Switzerland

=== Bibliography ===
- ^{(fr)} Swiss Financial Market Supervisory Authority, Circular 2011/01 "Activité d'intermédiaire financier au sens de la LBA" archive.
- ^{(fr)} Isabelle Augsburger-Bucheli, Blanchiment d'argent : actualités et perspectives suisses et internationales, L'Harmattan Editions, coll. "Les actes de l'ILCE", 2014, 290 p. (ISBN 978-2-343-03199-6).
- ^{(fr)} "Corruption et blanchiment d'argent : la Suisse, un paradis pour la criminalité économique", Public Eye - le magazine, no. 31, September 2021 (ISSN 2504-1258, read online archive); see also "Pour une lutte anti-blanchiment efficace : nos revendications" archive.

=== Related articles ===
- Swiss Financial Market Supervisory Authority
- Money laundering
- fr:Cadre de la lutte anti-blanchiment dans les établissements financiers (France)
- Anti–money laundering framework for financial institutions in France (trans. op. cit.)
- Corruption
- fr:Fiduciaire suisse
- Federal Act on Acquisition of Real Estate by Persons Abroad (Lex Koller)

=== External links ===
- Money Laundering (FedPol)
- Anti-Money Laundering Act archive on the Federal Administration website
