= National Independent Automobile Dealers Association =

- Abbreviation: NIADA
- Formation: 1946
- Type: Nonprofit organization
- Headquarters: Arlington, Texas, U.S.
- Services: Training programs, publications, online resources
- Members: 38,000+
- Formerly called: National Used Car Dealers Association (NUCDA)

The National Independent Automobile Dealers Association was founded in 1946, and serves as the representative body for over 38,000 used vehicle dealers in the United States. It is the only national level nonprofit organization representing the independent motor vehicle industry. It is headquartered in Arlington, Texas.

== History ==
In 1946, the National Used Car Dealers Association (NUCDA) was founded in Chicago, Illinois to lobby for the repeal of the rationing of tires and automotive parts following the end of World War II. After success in Washington in 1947, the NUCDA published a used car dealer "code of ethics". The following year, the headquarters was moved to Detroit, Michigan. In 1950, suppliers and vendors were invited and featured at the annual NUCDA convention.

== Renaming ==
The NUCDA changed its name to the National Independent Automobile Dealers Association (NIADA) in 1955. During this name change, the NIADA had roughly 2000 members, but continued to grow in size, boasting 7000 members in 1977. In 1975, the NIADA once again moved its headquarters to Raleigh, North Carolina. Lobbying efforts were again strengthened in 1979 when members of the NIADA donated $55,000 to fight against trade rule legislation. By the 2000s, the NIADA had grown to over 20,000 members.

== Mission ==
The NIADA states that its mission is to advance both the independent motor vehicle dealer and the consumer by providing relevant information about the automotive industry. In addition, the NIADA aids regulatory and lawmaking bodies by informing of possible consequences of proposed legislation to both the motor vehicle industry and its respective consumers. The NIADA also helps and collaborates with state level independent motor vehicle dealer associations; joining a state level independent automobile dealers association automatically includes membership in the NIADA.

== Services ==
The NIADA provides a range of training programs designed to advance independent dealers via publications, online resources, and NIADA.tv, the official automotive dealer television network of the NIADA.

Since 1999, the NIADA has released an annual used car industry report that details statistics such as dealer lot size, method of acquiring wholesale cars, and method of selling wholesale cars. The NIADA collects this information from a group of dealers known as Certified Master Dealers. The NIADA also releases its magazine, Used Car Dealer, on a monthly basis.

== See also ==
- CarGurus
- Collier Motors
