= VWorker =

Employment website for freelancers

vWorker
- vWorker Logo
- Company type: Privately held company
- Website type: Employment website
- Available in: English
- Founded: 2001; 25 years ago
- Dissolved: November 19, 2012; 13 years ago
- Headquarters: Tampa, Florida
- Area served: Worldwide
- Founder: Ian Ippolito
- Industry: Recruitment
- Registration: Required for posting projects and applying for jobs
- Users: 2.5 million
- Current status: Defunct; acquired by and redirected to Freelancer.com on 19 November 2012

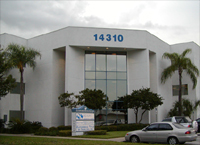
The vWorker Office

vWorker was an employment website that enabled companies to outsource projects and independent contractors to find work. Together with Elance, Freelancer.com, Guru.com, and Upwork, it was one of the largest global freelance marketplaces of its kind. It organized and streamlined the management of outsourced employees.

On November 19, 2012, Freelancer.com acquired vWorker "for a price in the millions" and the URL was redirected.

== History ==
vWorker was founded in 2001 in Tampa, Florida by Ian Ippolito under the name of Rent A Coder. Ippolito had previously launched the Planet Source Code website for sharing the source code of computer programs and wanted to create a platform for intermediating paid programming projects.

The type of job board that he had in mind differed from a static Craigslist-type online bulletin board by being enriched with features that would exclude the possibility that employers give out advance payments for work that does not get delivered when agreed or that does not meet their requirements, and the chance that contractors deliver their work online but never hear back from employers who choose not to pay. These protective features included time tracking software for pay-for-time projects, escrow accounts into which employers place the funds for a job and from which the mediating company pays contractors when the work is delivered, arbitration support for settling disputes, and a double blind rating system from previous employers and contractors for reputation management to build trust and credibility between parties who do not know each other. At the time the features were introduced, Rent A Coder was the first online marketplace to protect both employers and employees with escrowing and arbitration.

vWorker added several innovative features including trialsourcing, in which a competition is used for an initial sample of work, before hiring the freelancer in a traditional outsourcing manner.

Contributing factors to its growth were improved technological infrastructures (high-speed internet, open source and rapid development tools), increased competition and demand for expertise not available internally, and the Great Recession, during which employers looked for project-based alternatives to full-time employment, while the smaller number of available full-time jobs in people's immediate physical location made many of them become self-employed or try freelancing to earn additional income.

On April 15, 2010, the site expanded to a hundred new work categories that included, in addition to programming, also graphic design, writing, personal assistance, paralegal work, and others. To reflect the wider site audience, the company changed its name to vWorker, short for "virtual worker".

The company was listed on the Inc. 5000 ranking of the fastest-growing private companies in the United States for 4 consecutive years from 2007 to 2010.

In 2010, the site had approximately $3 million in revenue.

As of 17 November 2012, 1.3 million projects had been posted on the site with users earning $139 million. At that time, the site had 15 workers and $11.1 million in revenue.

== Business model ==
vWorker allowed employers to post projects and jobs on the website. Workers who were registered with the site competed for the opportunity to work on the projects by posting bids. Employers chose the bid they preferred and escrowed the funds with vWorker. When job were completed, employer authorized the release of the funds to the worker.

Employers did not pay any fees to list their jobs and workers were not charged subscription fees. vWorker made money by charging 6.5%–9% commission fees on successfully completed hourly projects and 7.5%–15% fees on fixed price projects; the commissions included strictly enforced arbitration and payment guarantees.

According to the model described, vWorker was not a freelancing marketplace in a traditional sense where workers created works on their own initiative, and then try to market and sell them while keeping the copyright to their work. On vWorker, all projects were performed on a work for hire basis in which an employer requested a certain task to be performed according to his or her specifications and received the copyright to the work produced.

Modern freelancing marketplaces are frequently also said to be characterized by a reverse auction type bidding system in which sellers compete to offer the lowest price that meets the specifications of a buyer's bid request, and prices decrease during the auction as sellers compete to offer lower bids than their competitors.

The bidding system on vWorker differed slightly from that general model. Because vWorker used closed or hidden bidding, a person who submitted a bid did not know the prices that other bidders quoted and could not modify his or her own bid accordingly, so there was no necessary decrease in bid amounts during the auction. It also turned out that the lowest bid on vWorker was chosen only by 20% of the employers and that most buyers tended to choose the bid that was submitted last.

== Criticisms ==
In 2004, workers in Livingston County, New York accidentally released private information about low-income and foster care families on the vWorker website while posting a project.

vWorker was also sometimes used by students to hire people to do their homework.

vWorker's solution was to strengthen its copyright and intellectual property complaint system so that it can be used by site users and members of the public for removing sensitive materials. Professors could use the same system to remove projects for homework because the professor who created the homework owns the copyright.

== See also ==
- Contingent workforce
- Crowdsourcing
- Freelance marketplace
- Intermediation
- Outsourcing
- Remote work
