= Elise Ippolito =

American artist

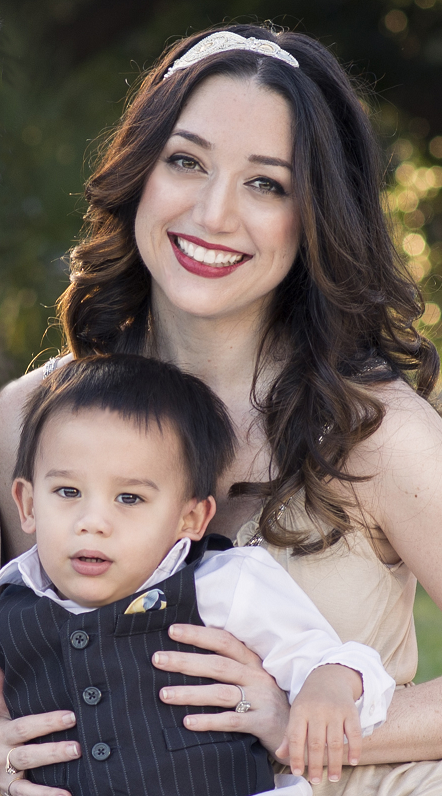
- Born: Frances Elise Gres; February 27, 1978 (age 48)
- Other names: Elise Gres; Elise Gres Ippolito
- Education: Duke University (BA); University of Florida (JD)
- Occupation: Portrait Artist
- Spouse: Ian Ippolito
- Website: www.elisegres.com

Elise Ippolito (born Frances Elise Gres, February 27, 1978) is an American artist based in Tampa, Florida. She has been featured in numerous media outlets for her works, including portrait and oil paintings.

Ippolito attended Duke University and went on to attend Fredric G. Levin College of Law at the University of Florida where she obtained her Juris Doctor. She practiced law in the Tampa area for approximately 2 years prior to pursuing her career in art, a passion that she took classes for in both high school and college. Ippolito began her art career through word of mouth, creating portrait paintings modeled after photographs that she took of clients. Her work grabbed the attention of the art community in 2005 when she was commissioned to paint a portrait for the Glazer Children’s Museum. After the portrait was created, Ippolito saw an increase in commissions for her paintings.

Ippolito was commissioned by South Tampa Magazine to create a portrait of JoAnna Garcia, best known as the daughter of Reba McEntire on the show Reba. The portrait was featured for the magazine's lead article in February 2006. The same year, her oil painting Holding and Beholding was chosen out of 200 paintings to represent the Lyssa Morgan Gallery Square Show in The Tampa Tribune.

Ippolito and her works have been featured in numerous news programs as well as the Scarfone Gallery and the Claire de Lune exhibition. In addition to art, Ippolito is a philanthropist, donating her time to the Junior League of Tampa and donating art to raise money for various causes to include the American Cancer Society. She is a resident of Tampa and is married to internet entrepreneur Ian Ippolito.

== Select works ==
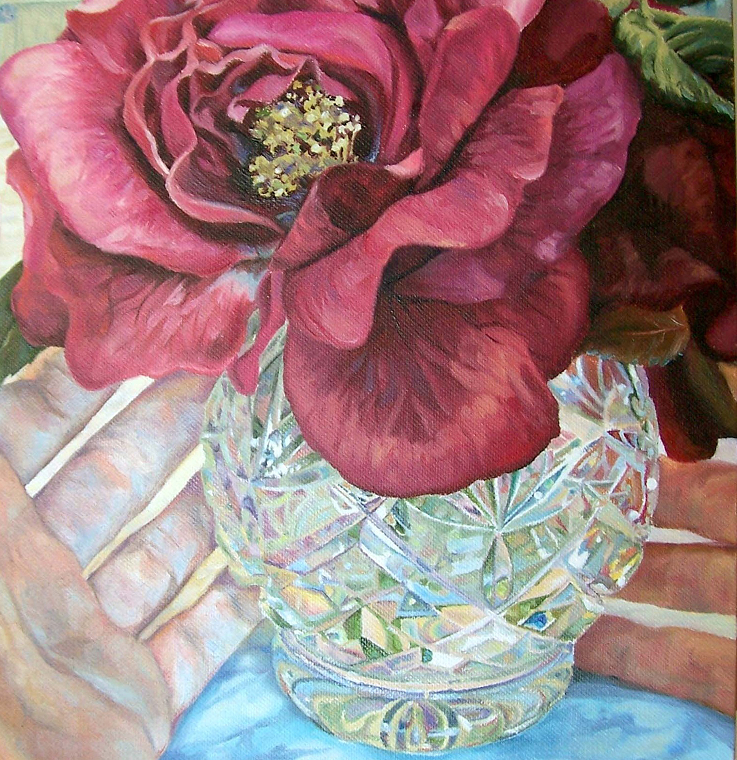
Portrait by Elise Ippolito.

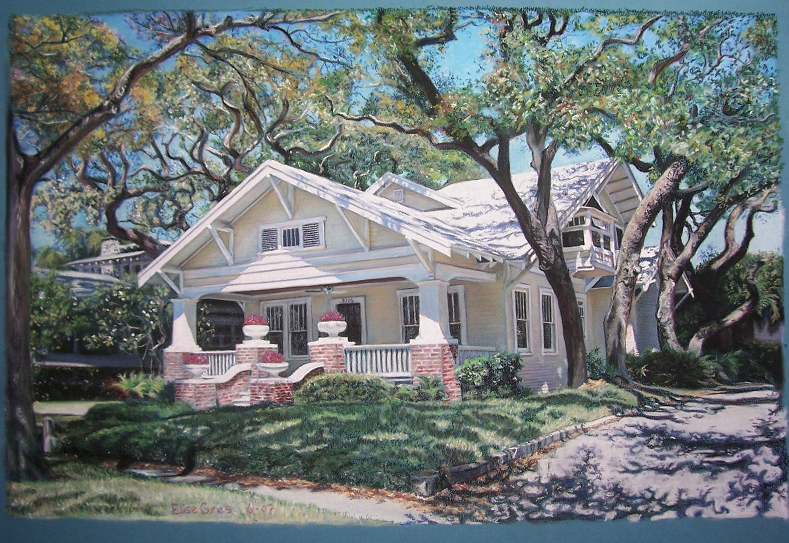
Bayshore Beautiful house portrait by Elise Ippolito.

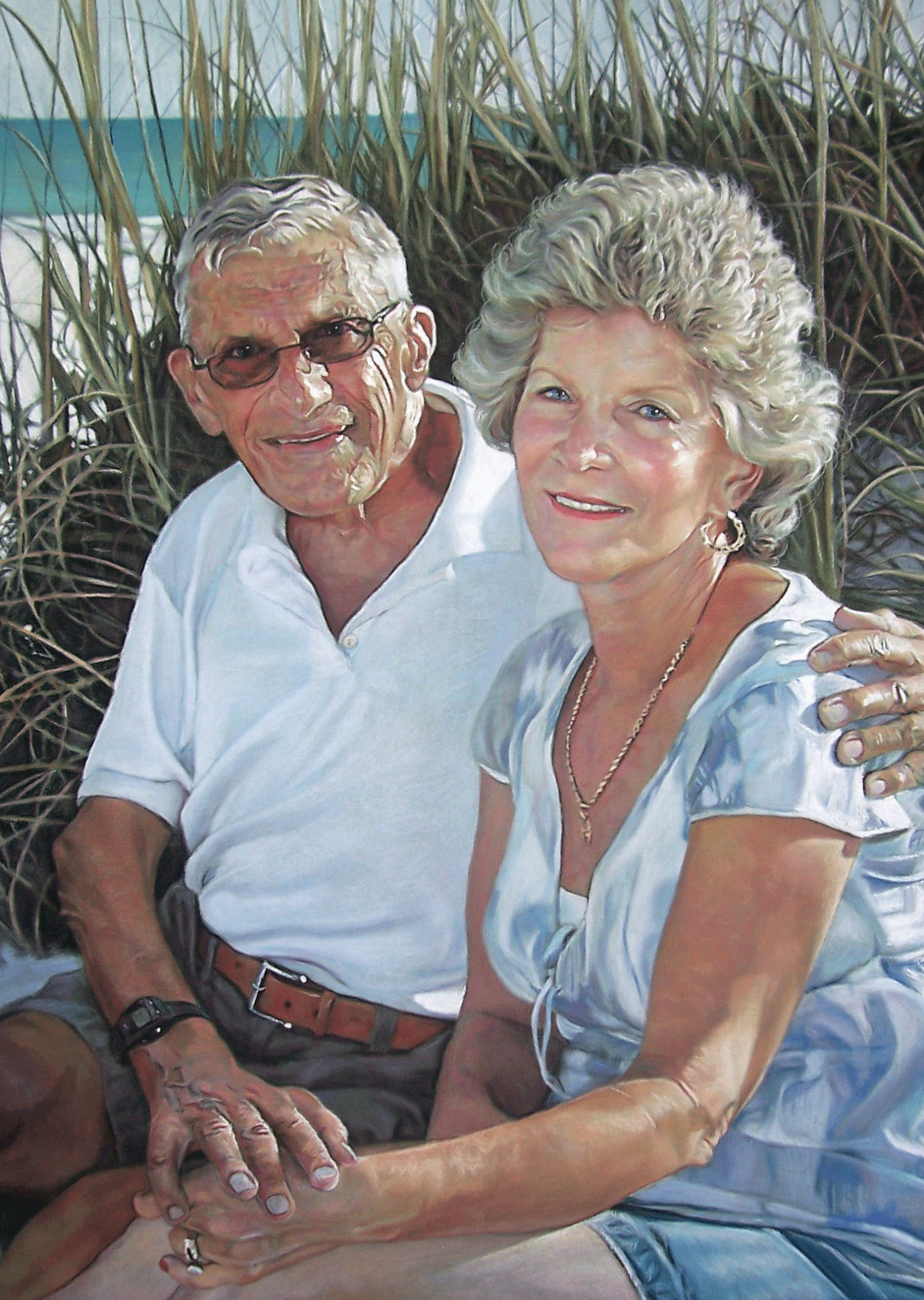
Portrait of Al and Jeanne Hardin by Elise Ippolito.

== See also ==
- Contemporary art
- 20th-century art
- List of 20th-century women artists
