= Operation Greenback =

US money laundering task force, 1979–1983

Operation Greenback was a Miami, Florida-based, multi-agency U.S. government task force targeting money laundering connected to drug trafficking.

== Formation and composition ==
The operation was established in response to the explosive growth of money laundering in South Florida following the increase in drug trafficking in the region. A 1979 cash-flow study by the Federal Reserve Bank found that Florida had a $5.5 billion cash surplus at a time when the rest of the country had a cash deficit.

The interagency task force was formed in late 1979 at the suggestion of the Treasury Department and launched investigations in 1980. The task force was the first interagency group set up to combat money laundering.

It was composed of investigators from the Justice Department (Narcotic and Dangerous Drug Section) and the Treasury Department (Internal Revenue Service (IRS) and U.S. Customs Service). The task force cooperated with the U.S. Attorney's Office for the Southern District of Florida and the Drug Enforcement Administration (DEA).

== Investigations and prosecutions ==
Investigators reviewed currency transaction reports (CTRs) and currency and monetary instrument reports (CMIRs) to identify violations of the Bank Secrecy Act. The operation resulted in a large number of federal seizures of cash bound for Colombian drug cartels. For example, in November 1980, agents seized $1.6 million in suspected drug profits and two aircraft after intercepting alleged traffickers at the Opa-Locka Airport. In October 1982, investigations raided a cocaine production laboratory in Miami, recovering $3 million and 40 pounds of cocaine, and arresting 11 people. In 1983, the operation expanded to Puerto Rico.

Major figures prosecuted as a result of Operation Greenback included Hernan Botero Moreno es, Isaac Kattan Kassin, and Alberto Barrera Duran. Kattan, a naturalized Colombian citizen based in Los Angeles, was an associate of drug barons Miguel Ángel Félix Gallardo and Juan Matta-Ballesteros. Kattan was arrested in 1981 with 20 kilograms of cocaine in his car. Searches of Kattan's home and four hotel rooms uncovered $40 million in cash. Kattan was convicted and sentenced to 30 years in prison. Barrera (nicknamed "Papa Smurf") pioneered the technique of smurfing, evading detection of suspicious deposits of cash by buying money orders and cashier's checks in amounts below $10,000, thus avoiding CTR reporting requirements. The scheme was dismantled in 1984 after Barrera and 13 others were charged with conspiracy to defraud the United States. About half of those charged, including Barrera, fled to Colombia, while others were arrested and sentenced to U.S. prison terms.

The Great American Bank of Dade County was also indicted in 1982 as a result of the investigation. The bank, which had laundered $60 million for Kattan in 1981 alone, entered a guilty plea in 1984 in connection with laundering a total of $94 million. The operation was generally successful at leading to prosecutions, and fragmented the drug trade. By the end of October 1982, the operation led to 125 arrests. The operation also demonstrated several gaps in the law, which led to the enactment of the Money Laundering Control Act in 1986, which (among other things) made smurfing a specific federal crime.
