= Collier Motors =

American car dealership

Coordinates: 35°29′23″N 77°58′57″W

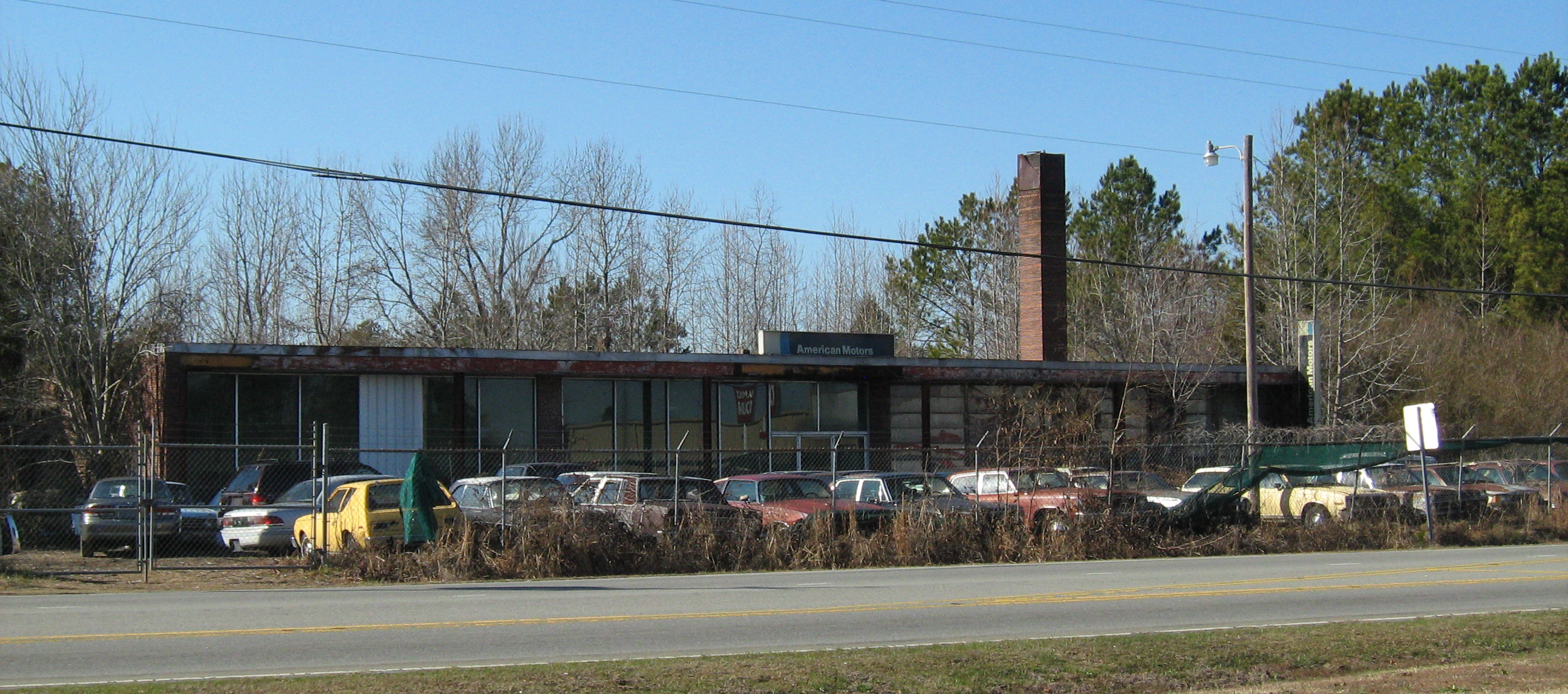
- Type: Private
- Industry: Car dealership
- Founded: 1955
- Founder: Robert Collier
- Headquarters: 4713 US Highway 117 S Pikeville, North Carolina
- Products: General automotive repair and parts
- Website: "Collier Motors AMC". Archived from the original on 14 December 2024.

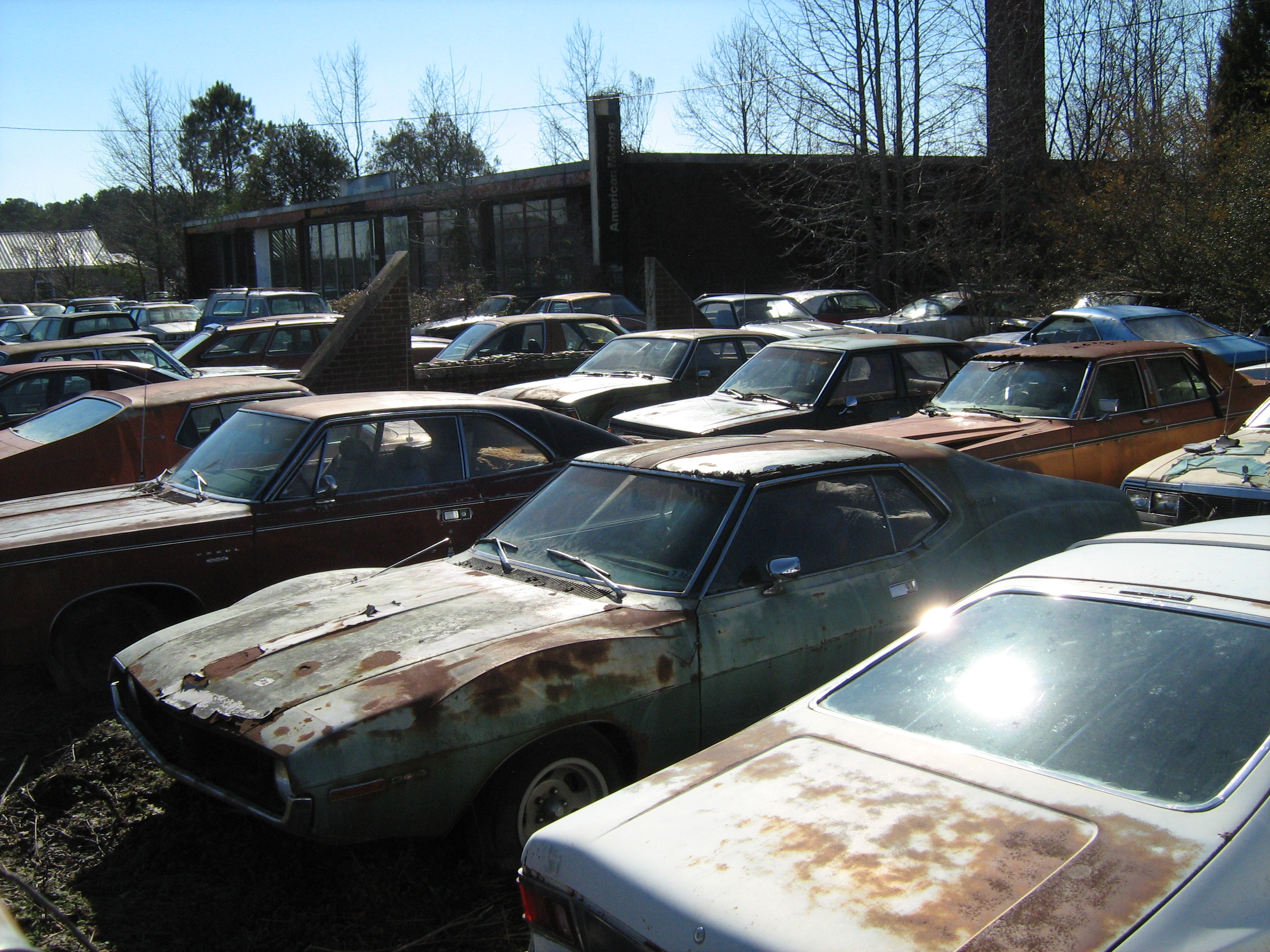
Vehicle inventory in the front lot

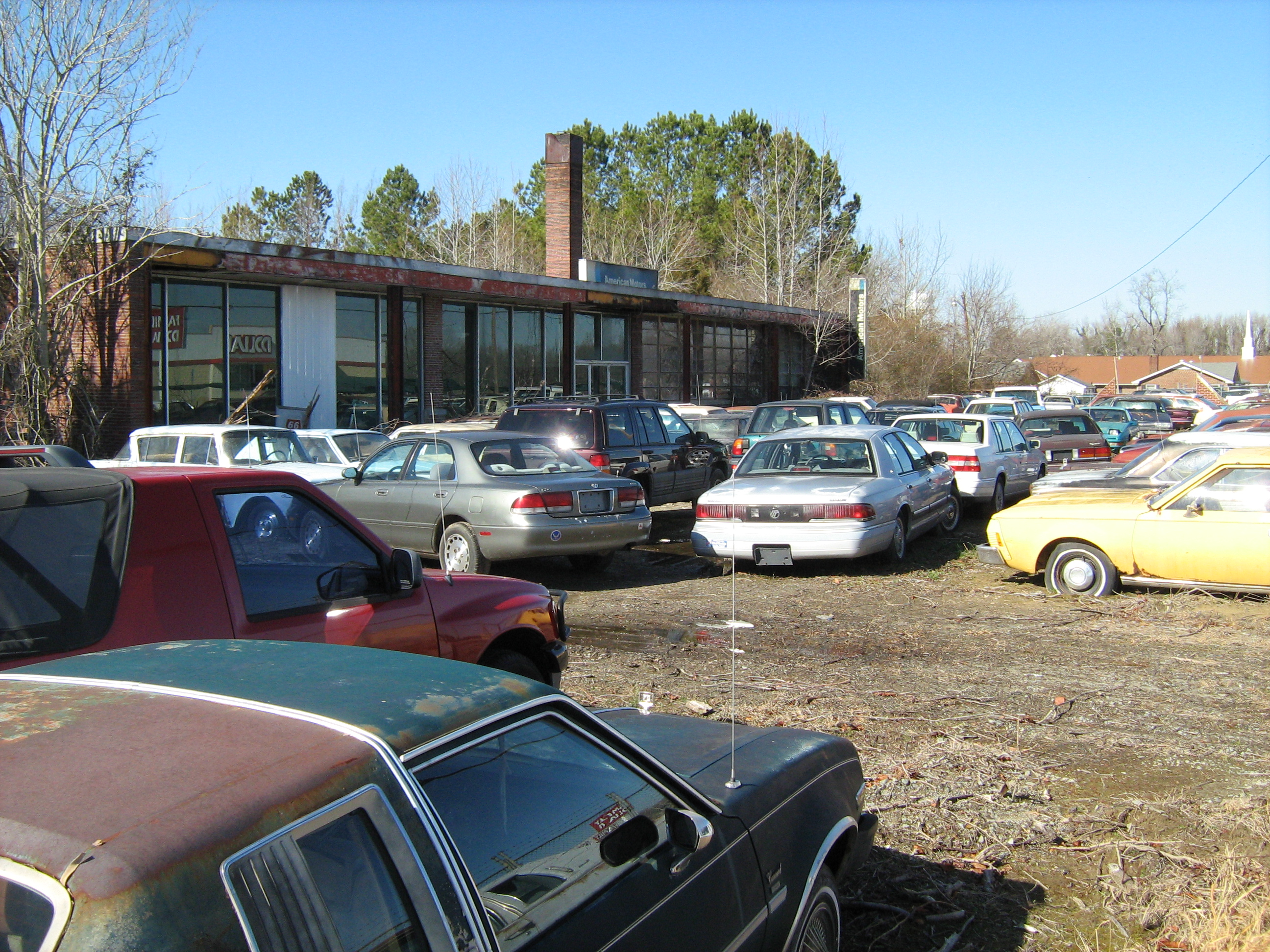
The dealership as of February 2011

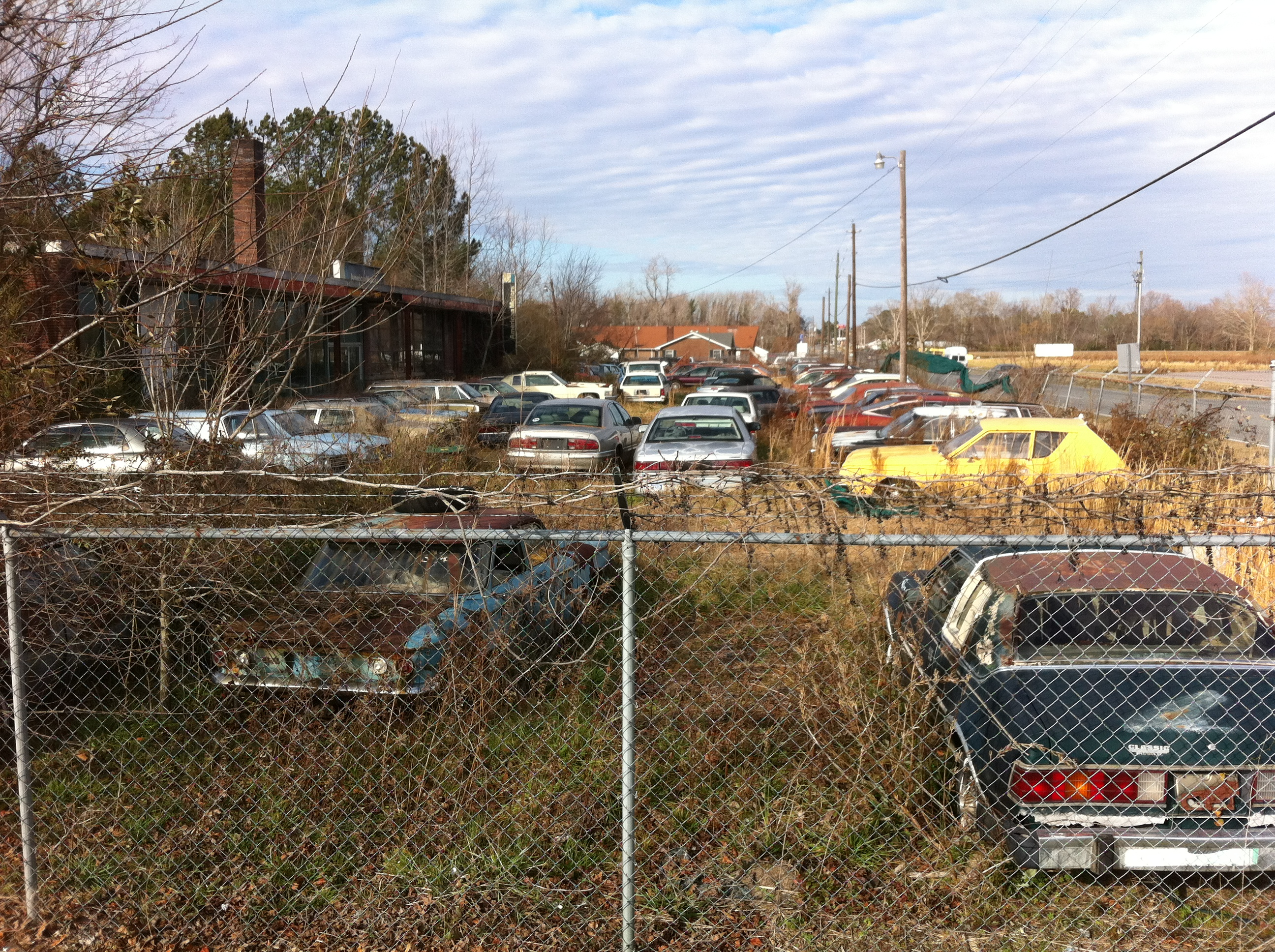
The front lot as of January 2012

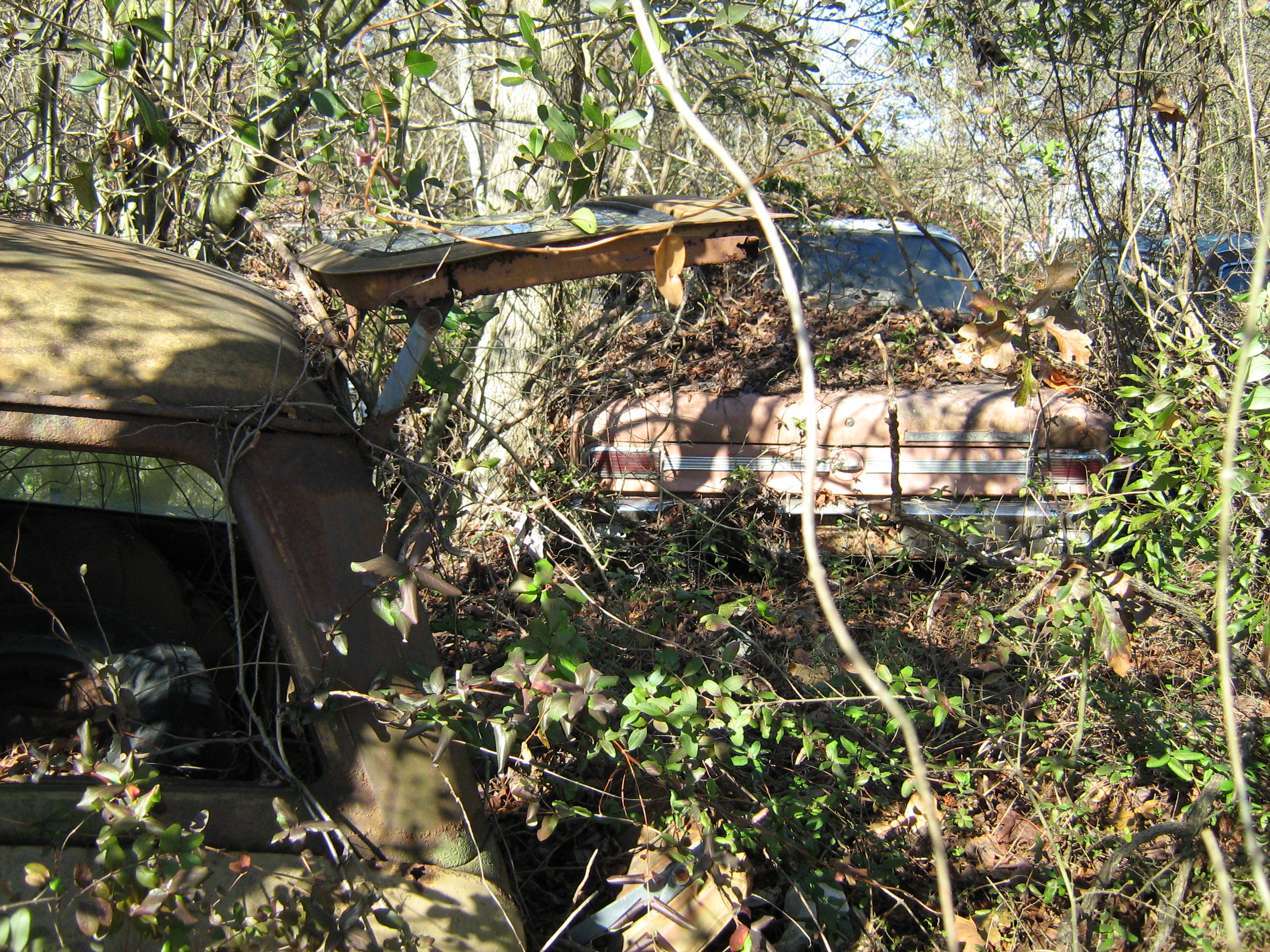
Rambler vehicles, surrounded by overgrown vegetation

Collier Motors is a private car dealership primarily selling cars built by American Motors Corporation (AMC), as well as servicing other makes. The business was for many years an AMC franchised dealership located on old U.S. Route 117 in Pikeville, North Carolina.

== Background ==
Robert Collier established Collier Motors in 1955 as a single entrepreneur while in his 20s. His father was also in the automobile business and continued working until he was in his 80s. Collier transitioned from marketing Chevrolets to selling cars made by American Motors Corporation (AMC). The longstanding relationship with AMC continued until the automaker was partially purchased by Renault in 1979.

After AMC began importing Renault models from France, Collier decided he preferred to sell only domestically designed and built cars. He would not sell new Renault-derived passenger cars, such as the 1983 Alliance that was assembled by AMC in Kenosha, Wisconsin. Collier continued to sell the stock he already had on the lot and focused his dealership on older AMC cars and Jeep vehicles, as well as used vehicles of other domestic makes. He lost the AMC franchise in the mid-1980s and automaker was bought by Chrysler in 1987.

The 5-acre (2.0 ha) property is on the west side of old U.S. Route 117. By 2010, the business was described by visitors as having "vehicles and parts slowly returning to the soil." Collier died on 11 February 2018, at the age of 88. The administration of the estate was placed mainly on Robbie Collier, the oldest son.

== Business ==
As of 2012, Collier Motors sits frozen in time. Attempting to settle Robert Collier's estate, the Collier family continues to sell off the remaining inventory. However, most have remained outside, unprotected, on the lot since the early 1980s. Vehicles included 1970s and 1980s-model AMCs, such as Gremlins, Pacers, Ambassadors, Matadors, Javelins, Eagles, Spirits, Hornets, and Concords. Some of the cars still retain their original Monroney window stickers. Once the inventory has been sold or otherwise disposed of, the property will be cleared and listed for sale.

== Historic vehicles ==
Historic vehicles owned by the Collier family and stored at the lot have included unique examples such as four 1950s Nash-Healeys and Barry Goldwater's two-seat AMX muscle car with a "tricked-out dash". There were also two Alabama Highway Patrol Javelins and a 1950 Nash Statesman from the 1991 movie The Marrying Man.

The policy has been to sell complete cars, not to part them out. A late-2021 estimate noted 40 "desirable" and restoration-worthy cars that include some high-performance equipped AMCs.

== Television ==
The American Pickers History Channel show (Season 10, Episode 1, "A Hard Rain's Gonna Fall" originally aired 13 May 2015) recounts the effort to retrieve two 1954 Nash-Healey sports cars for which they paid $46,000.

In the Lost in Transmission History Channel show (Season 1, Episode 5, "Fly Like an Eagle", originally aired 4 June 2015), the objective is to purchase replacement fender flares for an AMC Eagle.

Airing on 15 November 2022, Roadworthy Rescues (Season 1, Episode 7, "Rebel with a Cause") starring Derek Bieri, creator of the Vice Grip Garage YouTube channel, describes finding a 1967 AMC Rebel SST convertible to restore.
