= Lost in Transmission =

US television program

- Genre: Reality TV
- Starring: Rutledge Wood; George Flanigen
- Composers: Brad Segal (Fine Tune Music); Jesse Friedman (DL Music)
- Country of origin: United States
- Original language: English
- No. of seasons: 1
- No. of episodes: 6

Production
- Executive producers: Tabitha Lentle; Zach Behr; Nathaniel Grouille; Russell McCarroll; Travis Shakespeare; Brian j Halas; Jane Tranter
- Producers: Adam McFarlane; David Silberman
- Cinematography: Robert Knouse
- Editors: Juan Carlos Tonda; Brian Razzano
- Running time: 60 minutes
- Production company: Adjacent Productions

Original release
- Network: History
- Release: May 7 – June 11, 2015

Related
- Top Gear

Lost in Transmission is an American reality television series produced by Adjacent Productions. The series features Top Gear co-host and car expert Rutledge Wood and his friend, car restoration specialist George Flanigen, as they go on a road trip across the south. Their mission is to rescue America's greatest rides from barns, backyards and garages by restoring the under-appreciated and the most unusual automobiles to their former glory.

== Premise ==
Opening introduction (narrated by Rutledge Wood):

Nothing is more American than the car. But some of the most incredible vehicles are rotting away in barns and backyards. Luckily, I've got a plan for these forgotten treasures. I'm Rutledge Wood and I've personally owned over 80 cars. The only thing keeping me from buying 80 more is my wife, Rachel. So my buddy George and I are starting up a new business. I'll help me get my hands on these beauties and get them back on the road.

== Broadcast ==
The program premiered on Thursday, May 7, 2015, at 10:00 pm EST on History channel.

Internationally, the series premiered in Australia on September 7, 2015 on A&E.

== Episodes ==
No.	Title	Original release date
1	"Drowned DeLorean"	May 7, 2015
In the series premiere, automobile enthusiasts Rutledge Wood and George Flanigen start up a new car restoration business and begin their search for neglected run-down classic cars to rescue. They hit the road in a custom-built 1949 Chevy Kurbmaster step van and find their first project: a purple-painted 1981 DeLorean that was submerged in saltwater during Hurricane Sandy, that's now sitting in a Fayette County, Georgia garage. After restoring the car for their client, the goal is to race it on the Atlanta Motor Speedway and reach a speed of 88 MPH, just like in the film that made this rare vehicle famous, Back to the Future. Also, Rutledge brings home a 1969 Subaru 360 mini-van, which he turns into a supped-up gas-powered golf cart.
2	"The Thing"	May 14, 2015
The guys head to Alabama to restore a veteran's rusted-out spray-paint bright orange 1974 VW Thing with a budget of only $6,000 and a two-week deadline. Before it's finished, they swap out the old and slow 46 horsepower engine with a new 90 horsepower one and tests it out by racing on the mud track at Senoia Raceway in Senoia, Georgia. Also, Rutledge takes George to his hangar of unique cars to get his lime green 1985 Chevy Blazer, which he trades for a Buick Roadmaster station wagon. In order to keep it, he makes it more appealing for Rachel by painting it Lamborghini gray with barn wood side panels.
3	"Fire in the Hole"	May 21, 2015
The guys restore a rust and bug-infested 1964 Ford F100 with an original Y-block engine that has sat idle for four years out in the elements at their clients' farm. And since the truck for a 16-year-old, they test it out in front of a driving instructing on an orange cone obstacle course at a local high school. Also, George brings Rutledge to a classic car museum and gives him the monumental task in finding the exact same car he had as a teenager—a 1969 Corvette Stingray 427 T-top. Later, Rutledge is invited to the annual Legends car race at the Atlanta Motor Speedway and gets a spot for George in the race.
4	"Off Road Rust Bucket"	May 28, 2015
The guys head to Jasper, Georgia to restore a 1972 Toyota Land Cruiser FJ40 with an original 2F inline 6 engine that hasn't been driven in 20 years. Meanwhile, Rutledge didn't forget his promise to find George's long-lost 1969 Corvette and believes he found one in a Corvette parts garage, however, it's not an exact match and it's back to the drawing board. In order to cut costs on their restoration, the guys turn a normal 4-door VW Jetta into a 2-door utility pickup and sell it for $10,000. With the FJ near to completion, they decide to install a 2-inch lift kit with larger tires on it so their client can go mudding with her kids.
5	"Fly Like an Eagle"	June 4, 2015
The guys travel to Tennessee to transform a 1981 AMC Eagle, an all-wheel-drive station wagon, into a lowered street rod for their client. But in order to complete the body work, they take a 16-hour drive to North Carolina to Collier Motors to look for the last trim piece. And to test out the used V-8 engine salvaged from a fox body Ford Mustang, Rutledge challenges George to drag race in a Porsche 911 on the runway at the Atlanta Regional Airport. Also, Rutledge works up the courage to knock on the door of the owners of a long-sought 1951 Ford F1 truck that's painted pink and he's looking to purchase it for the right price. Even though he walked away when the deal wasn't right, he buys his own F1 truck to restore.
6	"Convertible Comeback"	June 11, 2015
A limited edition 1968 Ford XL convertible that was 1 of 12 with a 3-speed transmission and a 390 engine is restored as a surprise for its ailing owner. Later, Rutledge has word on George's long-lost Corvette, but it's not good news—a private investigator found his car and it was totaled in an accident with a 98 percentage it's destroyed. Even though Rutledge finds the same Stingray with the exact specifications, George won't replace his old Corvette with another, but he'll take the two percent chance to find it again. Also, Rutledge's 1949 Chevy Long Bed truck he bought is tricked-out as a gift for his wife, Rachel.
