= Matt Barrie (businessman) =

Australian technology entrepreneur (born 1973)

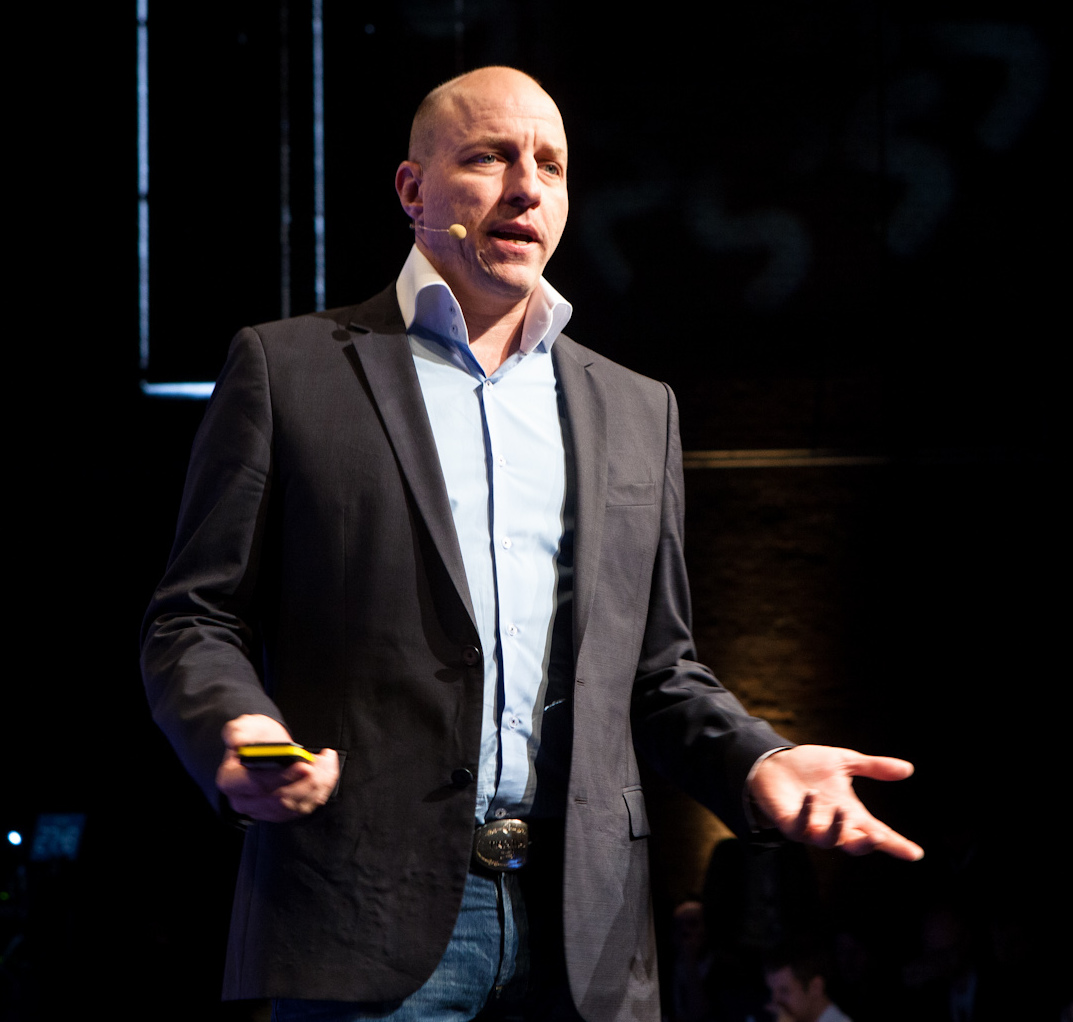
- Born: 16 August 1973 (age 52); Adelaide, Australia
- Education: Stanford University
- Occupation: Businessman
- Employer: Freelancer.com
- Website: mattbarrie.com

Robert Matthew "Matt" Barrie (born 16 August 1973) is an Australian technology entrepreneur. He is the chief executive officer of Freelancer.com, an online freelancing and crowdsourcing marketplace. Barrie is also an adjunct associate professor at the University of Sydney, where he has taught classes in computer and network security since 2001 and technology venture creation since 2010.

== Early life ==
In 1998, Barrie earned a master's degree in electrical engineering from Stanford University. After graduating, he was employed as a security consultant at the information security company Securify.

Subsequently, Barrie ran a home based online craft supply dropshipping operation.

== Career ==
In 2009, Barrie founded Freelancer.com, an online outsourcing marketplace. He was the Adjunct Associate Professor at the Department of Electrical and Information Engineering at the University of Sydney.
