= Freelancer.com =

Freelancing site

Freelancer International Pty Limited
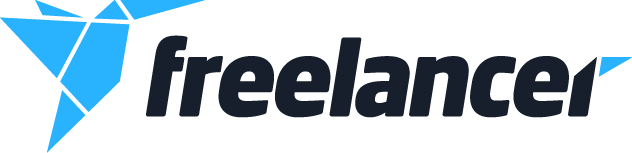
- Company type: Public company
- Website type: Freelance marketplace
- Available in: English, German, French, Indonesian, Italian, Portuguese, Spanish, Turkish, Filipino, Dutch
- Traded as: ASX: FLN
- Founded: 2009; 17 years ago
- Headquarters: Freelancer; Level 20; 680 George Street; Sydney, Australia
- Area served: Worldwide
- Founder: Matt Barrie
- CEO: Matt Barrie
- Key people: Matt Barrie, CEO; Neil Katz, CFO; Peter Phillips, VP Eng; Chris Koch, Deputy CFO
- Industry: Online Outsourcing
- Employees: 470 (March 2016)
- Website: www.freelancer.com
- Registration: Required
- Users: 59,961,774 (June 22, 2022)
- Launched: 2009; 17 years ago
- Current status: Active

Freelancer is an Australian freelance marketplace website, which allows potential employers to post jobs that freelancers can then bid to complete. Founded in 2009, its headquarters is located in Sydney, Australia, though it also has offices in Vancouver, London, Buenos Aires, Manila, and Jakarta.

== Description ==
Freelancer is a marketplace where employers and freelancers are able to find each other. The site allows employers to post work for site members who place bids in a competitive tender process. The site also allows members to host and enter contests for which prize money is offered as a reward. Freelancers and employers develop profiles on the site as they offer, win, complete work, and write and receive reviews from people they work with or for. The site's members receive a finite number of bids to use on the site, which are periodically replenished. A series of account options are offered, ranging from free accounts to professional subscriptions.

Freelancer takes a 10% fee, which can be reduced with paid monthly membership, with a minimum fee of $5.

Most of Freelancer's users come from India, the United States, the Philippines, Pakistan and the United Kingdom, but it is represented through its user network in 247 countries, regions and territories; and in both emerging and developed markets. The top three job categories that most frequently get job requests are IT and software (34%); design, media and architecture (31%); and writing and content (13%). The company has offices in Manila, Philippines; Sydney, Australia; Vancouver, British Columbia, Canada; Buenos Aires, Argentina; London, United Kingdom; and Jakarta, Indonesia.

== Background ==
Freelancer has acquired several crowdsourcing marketplaces including Get A Freelancer.com and EUFreelance.com (founded by Magnus Tibell in 2004, Sweden), Scriptlance.com (founded by Rene Trescases in 2001, Canada)- one of the early pioneers in freelancing, Freelancer.de Booking Center (Germany), Freelancer.co.uk (United Kingdom), Webmaster-talk.com (USA), a forum for webmasters, and vWorker (founded by Ian Ippolito, USA).

As of 29 March 2016, the company has set up 44 regional marketplaces and operates in 34 languages and 21 currencies, including India and Latin America. On 2 April 2014, Freelancer acquired Ukraine-based digital content marketplace Fantero.

In April 2014, Freelancer acquired The Warrior Forum, a marketing community site, for $3.2M

In April 2015, Freelancer acquired Escrow.com, a provider of Internet escrow services based in the United States.

In December 2016, the company acquired Brazilian job market service Prolancer as well as the Spanish career marketplace Nubelo.

Freelancer has taken steps to enter the freight marketplace business through their subsidiary Frieghtlancer.com. In 2018, Freelancer acquired the Australian enterprise marketplace Channel 40, which connects freight owners with transport operators. In May 2021, the company acquired Loadshift, a business that connects shippers and carriers in heavy transport services.

== Legal issues ==
=== 2015–2017 ===
In December 2015, the Office of the Australian Information Commissioner (OAIC) found Freelancer at fault for breaching the Privacy Act by violating the privacy rights of a former user and awarded that individual $20,000 in aggravated damages when Freelancer employees publicly exposed on Wikipedia and elsewhere the individual's private information, IP addresses, pseudonyms and other details after the individual wrote several critical comments and personal blog posts about the company. OAIC further ordered Freelancer to issue a written apology to the individual and for staff to undergo additional training on the handling of sensitive personally identifiable information. Spokespersons speaking on behalf of the company expressed their intent to appeal the ruling.

=== 2018 ===
In March 2018, it was reported that Freelancer was facing another complaint with the OAIC. Claiming damages of over $60,000 a complainant from the European Union alleges Freelancer's conduct in regard to privacy is in violation of Australian and European privacy legislation alike, a fact that would affect all of Freelancer's European customers, according to the complaint. Freelancer has not commented on the allegation.

== See also ==
- Upwork
- Fiverr
- PeoplePerHour
- Guru.com
