= Cybersixgill =

Israeli B2B cyber intelligence company

- Cybersixgill logo
- Company type: Private
- Industry: IT, Software, Security
- Founded: 2014
- Founder: Avi Kasztan; Elad Lavi
- Headquarters: Netanya, Israel
- Website: cybersixgill.com

Cybersixgill (formerly 'Sixgill') is an Israeli B2B cyber intelligence company that analyses and monitors the deep web and dark web for threat intelligence. The company was founded in 2014 and is headquartered in Tel Aviv, Israel.

In November 2024, Cybersixgill was acquired by Bitsight, a security rating company.

== History ==
Sixgill was founded in Tel Aviv, Israel, in 2014, by Avi Kasztan and Elad Lavi. The idea for Sixgill was developed by Kasztan. Soon after the company was established, it joined the Citibank accelerator program.

The Sixgill platform uses algorithms and technology to create profiles and patterns of dark web users and hidden social networks. It identifies and tracks potential cyber criminals to prevent malicious activity such as hacking and data breaches. Customers of Sixgill include; global 2000 enterprises, financial services, managed security service providers (MSSPs), government and law enforcement agencies.

In 2017, Sixgill was responsible for tracking ISIS cyber activity in relation to threats made towards Prince George and the British royal family. In 2019, Sixgill agents uncovered the money laundering activities undertaken by cyber criminals through the Fortnite Battle Royale online game in Russian, Chinese, Arabic, English and Spanish.

== Funding ==
In 2014, Sixgill received its initial funding of $1 million from Terra Labs. In 2016, the company raised an additional series A round of $4.3 million composed of $800,000 from Terra Labs and $3.5 million from Elron Electronic Industries.

In March 2022, Cybersixgill announced a $35 million Series B funding round raised from seven investors, bringing the company's total investment to $56 million.

== Awards and recognition ==
- 2019 - Cool Vendor in Security Operations Threat Intelligence, by Gartner Inc.
- 2022 - Winner in the "Baby Black Unicorn Awards" for companies with the potential to reach $1 billion market value in 3-5 years.
- 2022 - Winner of the CISO Choice Award for Threat Intelligence.
- 2023 - Named a winner of the Top InfoSec Innovators Awards for Threat Intelligence by Cyber Defense Magazine.
