= Subtitle B of Title III of the Patriot Act =

The USA PATRIOT Act was passed by the United States Congress in 2001 as a response to the September 11 attacks in 2001. It has ten titles, with the third title ("Title III: International Money Laundering Abatement and Financial Anti-Terrorism Act of 2001") written to prevent, detect, and prosecute international money laundering and the financing of terrorism.

Title III is itself divided into three subtitles. The second subtitle, entitled Subtitle B: Bank Secrecy Act Amendments and Related Improvements, largely modifies the Bank Secrecy Act (BSA) to make it harder for money launderers to operate, and to make it easier for law enforcement and regulatory agencies to police money laundering operations. The BSA was amended to allow the designated officer or agency who receives suspicious transaction reports to notify U.S. intelligence agencies. It also addresses issues of record keeping and reporting by making it easier to undertake the reporting of suspicious transactions; by making it a requirement that financial institutions report suspicious transactions; through the creation of anti-money laundering programs and by better defining anti-money laundering strategy; and by making it a requirement that anyone who does business file a report for any coin and foreign currency receipts that are over US$10,000. The subtitle increases civil and criminal penalties for money laundering and introduces penalties for violations of geographic targeting orders and certain recordkeeping requirements.

Subtitle B legislated for the creation of a secure network which can be used by financial institutions to report suspicious transactions and which can also give them alerts of relevant suspicious activities. Subtitle B also makes FinCEN a bureau of the United States Department of Treasury. The subtitle allows the Board of Governors of the Federal Reserve System to authorize personnel to act as law enforcement officers to protect the premises, grounds, property and personnel of any U.S. Federal reserve bank, and allows them to delegate this authority to U.S. Federal Reserve Banks. It instructs any United States Executive Directors of international financial institutions to use their voice and vote to support any country that has taken action to support the U.S.'s war on terrorism, and to require such Executive Directors to provide ongoing auditing of disbursements made from their institutions to ensure that no funds are paid to persons who commit, threaten to commit, or support terrorism.

== Dissent ==
Title III of the USA PATRIOT Act was passed with very little debate and the final vote in the United States House of Representatives was 412-1. The sole dissenting voice of an earlier version of the Act (the Financial Anti-Terrorism Act) was Republican U.S. Representative for Texas and former presidential nominee of the Libertarian Party Ron Paul. Paul in particular objected to a similar section to subtitle B's section 356, which makes it a requirement of brokers and dealers to report suspicious activities. Congressman Paul stated in Congress:

Among the most obnoxious provisions of this bill are: expanding the war on cash by creating a new federal crime of taking over $10,000 cash into or out of the United States; codifying the unconstitutional authority of the Financial Crimes Enforcement Network (FinCEN) to snoop into the private financial dealings of American citizens; and expanding the `suspicious activity reports' mandate to broker-dealers, even though history has shown that these reports fail to significantly aid in apprehending criminals. These measures will actually distract from the battle against terrorism by encouraging law enforcement authorities to waste time snooping through the financial records of innocent Americans who simply happen to demonstrate an `unusual' pattern in their financial dealings.

== Sec. 351. Amendments relating to reporting of suspicious activities ==
The Bank Secrecy Act (BSA) was amended to give financial institutions legal immunity from liability for any disclosures of suspicious transactions or activities to appropriate authorities, or for failing to notify any person identified in such a disclosure. The section also prohibits any employee or owner of a financial institution, or any officer or employee of any branch of the U.S. government, from notifying any person involved in a reported transaction that the transaction has been reported. The prohibition does not extend to employee references made under the Federal Deposit Insurance Act or in a written termination notice or employment reference made under the rules of any self-regulated organisation registered with the Security and Exchange Commission (SEC) or the Commodity Futures Trading Commission (CFTC), although the reference must not state that the disclosure was reported. It is noted that institutions are not required to include such information in their termination notices or employee references.

== Sec. 352. Anti-money laundering programs ==
The BSA was amended in 2004 to make financial institutions implement anti money laundering programs. Institutions must implement, at a minimum, the development of internal policies, procedures, and controls; the designation of a compliance officer; an ongoing employee training program; and an independent audit function to test programs. The Secretary of the Treasury is given authority to set minimum standards of these programs but may exempt from the application of those standards any financial institution that is not subject to the provisions of the rules contained in part 103 of title 31, of the Code of Federal Regulations. The section also orders the Secretary of Treasury to produce regulations "commensurate with the size, location, and activities of the financial institutions to which such regulations apply". These regulations were jointly produced by FinCEN and U.S. Treasury as 31 C.F.R. 103.137 on December 5, 2001 and largely focus on requiring insurance companies to form anti-money laundering programs — depository institutions were not targeted because the Bank Secrecy Act already requires them to have anti-money laundering programs.

== Sec. 353. GTOs: penalties and lengthening of period ==
There are two sections that specify civil and criminal penalties for those who violate the BSA or a regulation prescribed under the BSA: title 31, section 5321 of the U.S. Code deals with civil penalties, while title 31, section 5322 of the U.S. Code deals with criminal penalties. Both sections were amended by section 353 of the Patriot Act to extend penalties to apply to violations of any orders made under the BSA. Penalties were also made to apply for violations of regulations prescribed under section 21 of the Federal Deposit Insurance Act and section 123 of Public Law 91-508. Under 31 U.S.C. § 5324(a) it is against U.S. Law to attempt to evade such reporting, to cause or attempt to make the report contain a material omission or misstatement of fact, or to "structure or assist in structuring, or attempt to structure or assist in structuring, any transaction with one or more domestic financial institutions." This section was modified to include as the reporting requirements section 21 of the Federal Deposit Insurance Act and section 123 of Public Law 91-508.

Section 123 of Public Law 91-508 specifies regulations that govern recordkeeping for uninsured banks or institutions, or any other institution defined in 12 U.S.C. § 1953(b), while section 21 of the Federal Deposit Insurance Act specifies regulations that govern recordkeeping for insured depository institutions.

The section also lengthens the effective period of geographic targeting orders from 60 days to 180 days.

== Sec. 354. Anti-money laundering strategy ==
The BSA specifies that "the President, acting through the Secretary and in consultation with the Attorney General, shall develop a national strategy for combating money laundering and related financial crimes." In the development of that strategy, the legislation gives a list of areas that address any area the President, acting through the Secretary and in consultation with the Attorney General, considers appropriate. Section 354 added a new area to be addressed in the strategy: "Data concerning money laundering efforts related to the funding of acts of international terrorism, and efforts directed at the prevention, detection, and prosecution of such funding".

== Sec. 355. Written employment references and illegal activity ==
The Federal Deposit Insurance Act was amended to allow written employment references to contain suspicions of involvement in illegal activity in response to a request from another financial institution. The amendment makes clear that it allows such disclosures but does not require it, and also makes clear that the amendment does not shield from liability anyone who makes a disclosure that is found to have been made with malicious intent.

== Sec. 356. Reporting suspicious activities of brokers and dealers ==
Section 356 deals with suspicious activity reports (SARs). Part (a) states that the Secretary of Treasury was required to create regulations that require brokers and dealers registered with the Securities and Exchange Commission under the Securities Exchange Act of 1934 to submit suspicious activity reports under section 5318(g) of title 31, United States Code. The regulations filed were 31 CFR 103.11(ii), which amended the definition of a transaction to encompass any instrument within the definition of security in the Securities Exchange Act of 1934, and 31 CFR 103.19, which requires suspicious transactions over $US5,000 be reported to FinCEN. 31 CFR 103.19 provides details on filing procedures, details several exceptions to the filing requirement and specifies that records must be retained for a period of 5 years by dealer-brokers. It also requires that reports made to FinCEN remain confidential and gives limited liability to the reporting broker-dealer for any disclosures to appropriate authorities. Failure to file reports may be a violation of the BSA.

Part (b) of the section states that the Secretary of Treasury may prescribe regulations requiring futures commission merchants, commodity trading advisors and commodity pool operators registered under the Commodity Exchange Act to submit suspicious activity reports.

=== Investment company study ===
Part (c) specified that a report be produced jointly by the Secretary of Treasury, the Board of Governors of the Federal Reserve System, and the Securities and Exchange Commission with recommendations for effective regulations to apply the requirements of the BSA with regards to investment companies. This report was submitted to Congress on December 31, 2001. It gives a background to money laundering and how the BSA and Anti-Money Laundering Act (AML) was developed to counter increasingly sophisticated money laundering schemes and gives an overview of the general process criminals use to undertake money laundering, and how they use investment companies in each stage of the process. In order for effective regulations to apply to the BSA, the report acknowledges that different types of investment companies have different susceptibilities to money laundering and thus regulations must deal with them differently.

The report firstly defines what is meant by the term "investment companies". It defines an investment company as being either registered or unregistered. For registered investment companies, it found that mutual funds are the most susceptible to money laundering because money launders can get easy access to their money. The report found closed-end funds and interval funds were not as susceptible because investors must go through broker-dealer or banks, which are subject to anti-money laundering regulations already. The report also similarly found that unit investment trusts (UITs) to be of low risk of being used for money-laundering purposes.

For unregistered investment companies, the report found that hedge funds to be the most vulnerable to money laundering. This was because of the relatively high liquidity of their structure and interests. Hedge funds have relatively short periods where money is kept locked up, and a hedge fund's structure makes them vulnerable because domestic hedge funds do not need to identify the source of their funding, and offshore hedge fund structures are complex and more likely to allow "anonymous" investments. The report notes that commodity pools are highly regulated and that private equity funds and venture capital funds are long term investments that provide little opportunity to redeem their investments. The report also noted that Real Estate Investment Trust (REITs) investments "[tend] to be illiquid because the investors have no right to redeem their interests and the REIT often restricts the transfer of interests to comply with other [Internal Revenue Code] requirements".

The report makes a proposed rule which would apply the BSA to unregistered investment companies (67 CFR 21117 temporarily excluded unregistered companies from the requirements of the BSA). It was acknowledged in the report that listing all types of unregistered investment companies would,

unnecessarily burden businesses that money launderers are unlikely to use... [and] would bring within the scope of the BSA's anti-money laundering requirements as to tax the resources of the federal regulators charged with oversight of financial institutions and, thus, diminish the effectiveness of that oversight.

Therefore FinCEN proposed to apply the same definition to all investment companies except commodity pools and those funds that only primarily invest in real estate. Due to the broad scope of such a definition it was further narrowed to those investment companies that permit an investor to redeem part of their investment with two years after the investment was made; exclude investment companies with less than US$1,000,000 in assets by the end of the calendar quarter; and to funds that were organized in the U.S., that are organized or sponsored in by a U.S. person, or that sells ownership interest to U.S. people. Unregistered companies exclude family companies, employee securities companies and some types of employee benefit plans.

The report was also meant to look into anti-money regulations for personal holdings accounts, but no recommendations were given as this was an issue the U.S. Treasury decided they needed to continue to study.

== Sec. 357. Report on administration of bank secrecy provisions ==
A report was required to be submitted to Congress on the role of the Internal Revenue Service (IRS) in the administration of the BSA. The report was to recommend whether it was "advisable to shift the processing of information reporting to the Department of the Treasury under the BSA provisions to facilities other than those managed by the IRS". The report also needed to recommend whether, "in light of the objective of both anti-money-laundering programs and Federal tax administration, the Internal Revenue Service to retain authority and responsibility for audit and examination of the compliance of money services businesses and gaming institutions with those Bank Secrecy Act provisions".

The report was submitted on April 26, 2002 and concluded that,

...in light of the expertise, resources and focus of the IRS, the IRS should continue to perform the information processing and examination functions. The IRS has cultivated substantial anti-money laundering expertise over the years and contributed significantly to the administration of the BSA since its enactment in 1970. In recent years, the partnership forged by the IRS and FinCEN has been aimed at improving the administration of the BSA and prioritizing the challenges both agencies recognize need to be addressed.... It would be both wasteful of resources and disruptive to the administration of the BSA to transfer these functions, especially since there is no other comparable agency with a similar combination of expertise and resources that could readily assume them.

== Sec. 358. Bank secrecy provisions & anti-terrorism activities ==
The BSA was amended to allow the designated officer or agency who receives suspicious transaction reports to notify U.S. intelligence agencies. The stated purposes of the BSA, Section 123(a) of Public Law 91-508 and Section 21(a) of the Federal Deposit Insurance Act were amended to allow reports or records to be provided to agencies who conduct intelligence or counterintelligence activities, including analysis, in order to protect against international terrorism.

The BSA was also amended to direct the Secretary of Treasury to make available reports to agencies, U.S. intelligence, or self-regulatory organizations that are registered with the Securities and Exchange Commission or the Commodity Futures Trading Commission upon the request of the head of that agency or organisation. Exemptions for disclosure are made for circumstances covered under the Privacy Act of 1974.

The Right to Financial Privacy Act of 1978 was amended to allow financial records obtained under the Act to be transferred to another agency if they are relevant to intelligence or counter-intelligence activities related to international terrorism. None of the special procedures spelled out in the Financial Privacy Act under section 1114 apply to U.S. government authorities who conduct investigations or intelligence or counter-intelligence activities in relation to domestic or international terrorism. Financial records that are obtained under a subpoena from a Federal grand jury can now also be used for the purposes of counter-terrorism

The Fair Credit Reporting Act was amended to require consumer reporting agencies provide customer reports of a customer and all other information in a customer's file available to a government agency that is authorized to conduct counter-terrorism activities when presented with a written certificate by the agency. The consumer agency may not disclose to anyone that they have provided such information to the agency who requested the information. The consumer reporting agency, and any employee of the agency, is given safe harbor for providing such information, if it can be proven that it was done in good faith.

All the amendments made by section 358 of the Patriot Act apply with respect to reports filed or records maintained on, before, or after the date of enactment of the Act.

== Sec. 359. Reporting of suspicious activities by underground banking systems ==
Under the BSA, any person or group of people who transfer money as a business are defined as a money services business in order to bring those who operate informal value transfer systems outside of the mainstream financial system under the law. The amendments include "a licensed sender of money or any other person who engages as a business in the transmission of funds, including any person who engages as a business in an informal money transfer system or any network of people who engage as a business in facilitating the transfer of money domestically or internationally outside of the conventional financial institutions system" in the definition of a "financial institution" under the BSA. The BSA definition of a "money transmitting business" was also similarly amended. The rules promulgated under section 21 of the Federal Deposit Insurance Act was amended to apply to "any person that engages as a business in the transmission of funds, including any person who engages as a business in an informal money transfer system or any network of people who engage as a business in facilitating the transfer of money domestically or internationally outside of the conventional financial institutions system". This makes it easier for authorities to regulate, and investigate anti-money laundering operations in this segment of the U.S. economy.

The section also called for a report to congress on the need for any additional legislation relating to such people. The report found that:

- Existing BSA regulations are applicable to the U.S.-based operators of informal value transfer systems.
- That research did not suggest an immediate need for additional legislation, and neither did it suggest a need to change the threshold for the filing of Suspicious Activity Reports.
- The adequacy of the existing BSA rules should be reexamined over the course of U.S. Treasury's multi-year effort to enhance regulatory compliance among the operators of informal value transfer systems.
- The law enforcement and regulatory communities should undertake a comprehensive program to enhance their knowledge concerning the range of mechanisms used in informal value transfer systems in order to better understand them and to determine whether they think that any additional legislation is needed.

== Sec. 360. Use of authority of U.S. Executive Directors ==
The Patriot Act allows the United States President to instruct any United States Executive Directors of the international financial institutions (for example, the International Monetary Fund and the World Bank) to use their authority (termed "voice and vote") to support any loan or other utilization of the funds of respective institutions for countries that have shown to "take actions that contribute to efforts of the United States to respond to, deter, or prevent acts of international terrorism". The Secretary of Treasury is also given the authority to instruct the Executive Directors to aggressively use the voice and vote of the Executive Director to require an auditing of disbursements made from their institutions to ensure that no funds are paid to persons who commit, threaten to commit, or support terrorism.

== Sec. 361. Financial crimes enforcement network ==
FinCEN, established in 1990, was made a bureau in the U.S. Department of the Treasury. The head of the bureau is now appointed by the Secretary of Treasury and was formally given a variety of responsibilities and powers, including:

- Providing advice and making recommendations on matters relating to financial intelligence, financial criminal activities and other financial activities to the Under Secretary of the Treasury for Enforcement.
- Maintain a government-wide data access service, with access, in accordance with applicable legal requirements, to:
  - the information collected by the Department of the Treasury, including report information filed under the BSA;
  - information regarding national and international currency flows;
  - other records and data maintained by other Federal, State, local, and foreign agencies, including financial and other records developed in specific cases; and
  - other privately and publicly available information
- Analyze and disseminate the available data in order to deal with financial crime.
- Establish and maintain a financial crimes communications center to furnish law enforcement authorities with intelligence information related to emerging or ongoing investigations and undercover operations.
- Furnish research, analytical, and informational services to financial institutions, appropriate Federal regulatory agencies with regard to financial institutions, and appropriate Federal, State, local, and foreign law enforcement authorities, in accordance with policies and guidelines established by the Secretary of the Treasury or the Under Secretary of the Treasury for Enforcement, in the interest of detection, prevention, and prosecution of terrorism, organized crime, money laundering, and other financial crimes.
- Assist Federal, State, local, and foreign law enforcement and regulatory authorities in combatting the use of informal, nonbank networks and payment and barter system mechanisms that permit the transfer of funds or the equivalent of funds without records and without compliance with criminal and tax laws.
- Provide computer and data support and data analysis to the Secretary of the Treasury for tracking and controlling foreign assets.
- Coordinate with financial intelligence units in other countries on anti-terrorism and anti-money laundering initiatives, and similar efforts.
- Administer the requirements of the BSA, chapter 2 of title I of Public Law 91-508, and section 21 of the Federal Deposit Insurance Act, to the extent delegated such authority by the Secretary of the Treasury.
- Such other duties and powers as the Secretary of the Treasury may delegate or prescribe.

The U.S. Secretary of Treasury is also given responsibility for administering the government-wide data access service and the financial crimes communications center maintained by FinCEN. 31 U.S.C. § 310 also gave FinCEN guaranteed funding for the period of 2002 to 2005.

This section of the Patriot Act makes it a requirement of the Secretary of Treasury to report yearly on how to improve compliance of 31 U.S.C. § 5314, which deals with the records and reports on foreign financial agency transactions. The Secretary submitted the initial report on April 24, 2002, and has submitted one every year except in 2004.

== Sec. 362. Establishment of highly secure network ==
The U.S. Secretary of Treasury was charged with establishing a highly secure network to allow financial reports required under the BSA, chapter 2 of Public Law 91-508 or section 21 of the Federal Deposit Insurance Act to be filed electronically. The legislation also requires the secure network to send alerts and other information in relation to suspicious activities to financial institutions. The network was required to be finished within 9 months of the enactment of the Patriot Act. According to the testimony of Dennis Lormel, Chief of the Terrorist Financing Operations Section of the Federal Bureau of Investigation's Counterterrorism Division, the USA Patriot Act Communication System was developed by FinCEN from such requirements.

== Sec. 363. Increase in penalties for money laundering ==
The Secretary of Treasury was given the authority to issue money penalties in an amount equal to not less than twice the amount of the transaction, but not more than US$1,000,000, on any financial institution or agency who commits a civil or criminal violation of International counter money laundering measures.

== Sec. 364. Uniform protection authority for Federal Reserve facilities ==
The Board of Governors of the Federal Reserve System are given authority to authorize personnel to act as law enforcement officers to protect the premises, grounds, property and personnel of any U.S. Federal reserve bank, as well as any operations conducted by or on behalf of the Board. The Board may also delegate this authority to a U.S. Federal reserve bank, so long as the reserve bank makes sure they follow the regulations proscribed by the Board and which are approved by the U.S. Attorney General. Law enforcement personnel are authorized to carry firearms and to make arrests for felonies committed while on the grounds or within the buildings of the Board or a reserve bank. Law enforcement officers must have successfully completed law enforcement training and be authorized to carry firearms and make arrests.

== Sec. 365. Reports relating to coins and currency ==
Section 5331 ("Reports relating to coins and currency received in nonfinancial trade or business") was added to the BSA. It makes anyone who does business file a report for any coin and foreign currency receipts that are over US$10,000. The report must contain the name, address and any other identifying information so required by the U.S. Secretary of Treasury; the amount of coins or foreign currency received; the date and nature of the transaction and any other information required by the Secretary of Treasury. However, should a transaction be made that involves foreign currency then the report does not need to be made, and instead reports should be made through the relevant regulations covered under 31 U.S.C. § 5315. Transactions that are made entirely outside of the United States are also not covered under 31 U.S.C. § 5331. 31 U.S.C. § 5324, which prohibits the structuring of transactions in such a way as to evade reporting requirements, was also amended to include the reporting of any coin and foreign currency receipts over US$10,000. The term "nonfinancial trade or business" was made to mean "any trade or business other than a financial institution that is subject to the reporting requirements of section 5313 and regulations prescribed under such section."

== Sec. 366. Efficient use of CTRs ==
In 1970, U.S. Congress established currency transaction reporting requirements via the BSA. However, though government agencies found the reports to be extremely useful in criminal, tax and regulatory investigations, it soon became apparent that the sheer volume of such reports was becoming overwhelming. Therefore, in 1986, Congress passed the Money Laundering Control Act (MLCA), which did two things: firstly, it made it easier to report this information (previously, tellers had to contact an agent directly, the Act allowed tellers to merely fill in a form and submit it to the agency); and secondly, it gave legal immunity to financial institutions that did report such transactions. The MLCA also made mandatory exceptions to certain reports that had little use to U.S. law enforcement agencies. In 2001, however, Congress found that some financial institutions were not utilizing the exemption system and, once again, the volume of reports was interfering with law enforcement. In fact, the number of Currency transaction reports (CTRs) filed on in the 2002 financial year was 12.3 million. Though this represented a decrease from the 13 million filed in the 2000 financial year, only 118,678 exemptions were made: a tiny fraction of the total amount of CTRs filed.

Congress ordered a study to be made to determine why the volume of CTRs were being made and how this problem could be alleviated. The study was completed in October 2002, and found that the most frequently cited reasons by survey respondents for not using the exemption system were:

- The fear of regulatory action if an exemption turns out to be wrong;
- Difficulty in determining whether a customer is eligible for exemption;
- The additional costs associated with due diligence;
- Lack of staff time to review CTRs for possible exemptions; and
- The transactions requiring CTR filings are too infrequent. According to the study:
- This response reflects the fact that smaller depository institutions, which are less likely to conduct large cash transactions, constituted the majority of depository institutions in the survey, and, in fact, outnumber such large institutions.

Based on the findings, the Secretary offered the following recommendations for legislative and/or regulatory change:

- "FinCEN should work with the federal bank regulators, as well as banks, to reduce, as appropriate, fear of adverse regulatory consequences from making incorrect exemption determinations, including issuing an Advisory encouraging the use of the exemption process.
- "FinCEN, in conjunction with the federal bank regulators, should draft and disseminate a new exemption handbook with a view to making the exemption system easier for bank personnel to understand.
- "FinCEN should revise the waiting period requirement for non-listed customers to permit banks to use a risk-based approach in determining when to exempt a customer.
- "FinCEN should amend the exemption regulation to simplify and make less burdensome the biennial certification and monitoring system requirement for non-listed customers.
- "The exemption process should not be made mandatory, nor are any other statutory changes necessary at this time. FinCEN should continue to seek ways to improve the efficiency and efficacy of the CTR reporting system. It should also work toward achieving an accurate measurement of the success of the system. These steps will help achieve the goal of finding the optimal balance between the value of the BSA reporting system and database and the burdens imposed to create and maintain it."
