= Title III of the Patriot Act =

Legislation of the United States

The USA PATRIOT Act was passed by the United States Congress in 2001 as a response to the September 11, 2001 attacks. It has ten titles, each containing numerous sections. Title III: International Money Laundering Abatement and Financial Anti-Terrorism Act of 2001 is actually an act of Congress in its own right as well as being a title of the USA PATRIOT Act, and is intended to facilitate the prevention, detection and prosecution of international money laundering and the financing of terrorism. The title's sections primarily amend portions of the Money Laundering Control Act of 1986 and the Bank Secrecy Act of 1970.

The provisions of Title III are divided into three subtitles. The first deals primarily with strengthening banking rules specifically against money laundering, especially on the international stage. Communication between law enforcement agencies and financial institutions, as well as among institutions, is expanded by the second subtitle, which also increases record keeping and reporting requirements. The final portion of the title deals with currency smuggling and counterfeiting, including quadrupling the maximum penalty for counterfeiting foreign currency.

== Findings, purposes and review ==
=== Findings ===
The United States Congress found that money laundering "provides the financial fuel that permits transnational criminal enterprises to conduct and expand their operations to the detriment of the safety and security of American citizens" and that it is critical to the financing of global terrorism and terrorist attacks. Money laundering is used "as protective covering for the movement of criminal proceeds and the financing of crime and terrorism". Findings (4) and (5) state that:

certain jurisdictions outside of the United States that offer `offshore' banking and related facilities designed to provide anonymity, coupled with weak financial supervisory and enforcement regimes, provide essential tools to disguise ownership and movement of criminal funds, derived from, or used to commit, offenses ranging from narcotics trafficking, terrorism, arms smuggling, and trafficking in human beings, to financial frauds that prey on law-abiding citizens... [T]ransactions involving such offshore jurisdictions make it difficult for law enforcement officials and regulators to follow the trail of money earned by criminals, organized international criminal enterprises, and global terrorist organizations

Congress in particular noted that correspondent accounts are vulnerable to use by money launderers as it is easier to obscure the identities of the owners of such accounts than with other types of bank accounts, and that private banking services can be susceptible to manipulation by money launderers.

Congress also found that:

United States anti-money laundering efforts are impeded by outmoded and inadequate statutory provisions that make investigations, prosecutions, and forfeitures more difficult, particularly in cases in which money laundering involves foreign persons, foreign banks, or foreign countries

and

the ability to mount effective counter-measures to international money launderers requires national, as well as bilateral and multilateral action, using tools specially designed for that effort

=== Purposes ===
The purposes of the title are defined in section 302. It states that:

The purposes of this title are—

(1) to increase the strength of United States measures to prevent, detect, and prosecute international money laundering and the financing of terrorism;

(2) to ensure that--

(A) banking transactions and financial relationships and the conduct of such transactions and relationships, do not contravene the purposes of subchapter II of chapter 53 of title 31, United States Code, section 21 of the Federal Deposit Insurance Act, or chapter 2 of title I of Public Law 91-508 (84 Stat. 1116), or facilitate the evasion of any such provision; and

(B) the purposes of such provisions of law continue to be fulfilled, and such provisions of law are effectively and efficiently administered;

(3) to strengthen the provisions put into place by the Money Laundering Control Act of 1986 (18 U.S.C. 981 note), especially with respect to crimes by non-United States nationals and foreign financial institutions;

(4) to provide a clear national mandate for subjecting to special scrutiny those foreign jurisdictions, financial institutions operating outside of the United States, and classes of international transactions or types of accounts that pose particular, identifiable opportunities for criminal abuse;

(5) to provide the Secretary of the Treasury (in this title referred to as the `Secretary') with broad discretion, subject to the safeguards provided by the Administrative Procedure Act under title 5, United States Code, to take measures tailored to the particular money laundering problems presented by specific foreign jurisdictions, financial institutions operating outside of the United States, and classes of international transactions or types of accounts;

(6) to ensure that the employment of such measures by the Secretary permits appropriate opportunity for comment by affected financial institutions;

(7) to provide guidance to domestic financial institutions on particular foreign jurisdictions, financial institutions operating outside of the United States, and classes of international transactions that are of primary money laundering concern to the United States Government;

(8) to ensure that the forfeiture of any assets in connection with the anti-terrorist efforts of the United States permits for adequate challenge consistent with providing due process rights;

(9) to clarify the terms of the safe harbor from civil liability for filing suspicious activity reports;

(10) to strengthen the authority of the Secretary to issue and administer geographic targeting orders, and to clarify that violations of such orders or any other requirement imposed under the authority contained in chapter 2 of title I of Public Law 91-508 and subchapters II and III of chapter 53 of title 31, United States Code, may result in criminal and civil penalties;

(11) to ensure that all appropriate elements of the financial services industry are subject to appropriate requirements to report potential money laundering transactions to proper authorities, and that jurisdictional disputes do not hinder examination of compliance by financial institutions with relevant reporting requirements;

(12) to strengthen the ability of financial institutions to maintain the integrity of their employee population; and

(13) to strengthen measures to prevent the use of the United States financial system for personal gain by corrupt foreign officials and to facilitate the repatriation of any stolen assets to the citizens of countries to whom such assets belong.

(Source: Wikisource)

=== Review ===
The Act has provisions to allow title III to expire after the first day of fiscal year 2005. The title would terminate if Congress enacted a joint resolution with the text after the resolving clause being:

That provisions of the International Money Laundering Abatement and Anti-Terrorist Financing Act of 2001, and the amendments made thereby, shall no longer have the force of law.

However, in 2005 no such joint resolution was made, and the title remains in effect to this day.

== Subtitle A—International Counter Money Laundering and Related Measures ==
International Money Laundering Abatement and Financial Anti-Terrorism Act of 2001
U.S. Congress
Long title:	International Money Laundering Abatement and Financial Anti-Terrorism Act of 2001
Introduced by:	Rep. Frank James Sensenbrenner, Jr. Wisconsin, 2001-10-23
Dates
Date passed:	October 24, 2001 (House), October 25, 2001 (Senate)
Date signed into law:	2001-10-26
Amendments:
Related legislation:	USA PATRIOT Act, Federal Deposit Insurance Act, Gramm-Leach-Bliley Act, Foreign Agents Registration Act of 1938, Administrative Procedures Act, International Emergency Economic Powers Act, International Banking Act of 1978, Right to Financial Privacy Act of 1978

Subtitle A (titled "International Counter Money Laundering and Related Measures") is the first part of title III and is designed to put measures into place that counter international money laundering. It does this in several ways: it makes financial institutions undertake several new special measures against money laundering (identification is dealt with particularly); by restricting or prohibiting the use of certain types of bank accounts; through adding further legislation that regulates a financial institution's dealing with foreign concerns; by adding new penalties for corruption and through regulations that are designed to facilitate and encourage reporting and communication between financial institutions and the U.S. government.

=== Special measures ===
There are several sections that establish special measures that financial institutions must undertake. Section 311 requires the maintenance of records of the aggregate amount of all transactions that are made outside the U.S. in areas where money-laundering has been identified as a concern; that reasonable steps be undertaken by a financial institution to obtain and retain information on foreigners who gain a benefit of ownership of an account which is opened and maintained in the U.S., and yet who do not own the account itself (also known as beneficial ownership); and that the financial institution identify any foreign customers who are authorised to use or route transactions through a payable-through account in the U.S.. Section 314 adds regulations that attempt to foster cooperative efforts to deter money laundering. This was mainly done by ordering the U.S. Treasury and other agencies to create regulations that set out how information was to be shared, and by allowing financial institutions to share information with other financial institutions when so allowed by the Secretary of Treasury. Section 327 makes it harder for bank holding companies or banks to merge or consolidate with another bank holding company if they have not got a good track record in combating money laundering activities, and also makes it harder for insured depository institutions to merge with non-insured depository institutions if the insured depository institution has a bad track record in combating money laundering activities. A number of sections (sections 312, 313, 319 and 325) deal with the forfeiture of goods if international terrorism or money laundering is suspected.

To deal with problems of identifying those who undertake money laundering activities, section 326 of the subtitle was designed to make it harder to mask the identity of individuals or groups who perform transactions or open accounts in the United States. Under this section, the Secretary of the Treasury was given the task of prescribing regulations that set forth the minimum standards that financial institutions must undertake to verify the identity of customers who open accounts. These rules became effective on June 9, 2003, although financial institutions had until October 1, 2003 to come into compliance. The minimum requirements under the section require financial institutions to establish procedures to take reasonable and practicable measures to verify the identity of those applying for an account with the institution; maintain records of the information used to verify a person's identity, including name, address, and other identifying information; and to consult lists of known or suspected terrorists or terrorist organizations, provided to the financial institution by any government agency, to determine whether a person seeking to open an account appears on any such list. When prescribing the regulations, the Secretary was ordered to take into account the types of accounts available to financial institutions, the various methods someone can use to open accounts, and the various types of identifying information available to the institutions.

=== Restrictions on accounts and foreign banks ===
Section 313 prohibits foreign shell banks that are not an affiliate of a bank that has a physical presence in the U.S. or that is not subject to supervision by a banking authority in a non-U.S. country regulating the affiliated depository institution, credit union, or foreign bank. The subtitle has several sections that prohibit or restrict the use of certain accounts held at financial institutions. Under section 312, financial institutions must undertake steps to identify the owners of any non-U.S. bank that is not publicly listed who have a correspondent account with them, along with the interests of each of the owners in the bank. It is expected that additional scrutiny will be applied by the U.S. institution to such banks to make sure they are not engaging in money laundering. They must also identify the nominal and beneficial owners of any private bank account opened and maintained in the U.S. by non-U.S. citizens and must undertake enhanced scrutiny of the account if it is owned by, or is being maintained on behalf of, any senior political figure where there is reasonable suspicion of corruption. Under section 319 any deposits into foreign banks are also considered to have been deposited into any interbank account the foreign bank may have in the U.S. Thus any restraining order, seizure warrant or arrest warrant may be made against the funds in the interbank account held at a U.S. financial institution, up to the amount deposited in the account at the foreign bank.

Section 325 prohibits financial institutions from allowing clients to specifically direct transactions that move their funds into, out of, or through an internal bank concentration accounts — financial institutions are also prohibited from informing clients about the existence of such accounts and are not allowed to make any disclosure that may give customer a way of identifying such internal accounts. The section requires financial institutions to document and follow methods of identifying where the funds are for each customer in a concentration account that comingles funds belonging to one or more customers. The restrictions on concentration accounts were made because such accounts do not provide an effective audit trail for transactions, and this may be used to facilitate money laundering.

=== Actions on non-U.S. soil ===
A number of sections deal with actions taken on non-U.S. soil. Section 315 includes specific acts of unlawful activity in the definition of money laundering. These include making a financial transaction in the U.S. in order to commit a crime of violence; the bribery of public officials and fraudulent dealing with public funds; the smuggling or illegal export of controlled munitions; the importation or bringing in of any firearm or ammunition not authorised by the U.S. Attorney General and the smuggling of any item controlled under the Export Administration Regulations. It also includes any offense where the U.S. would be obligated under a mutual treaty with a foreign nation to extradite a person, or where the U.S. would need to submit a case against a person for prosecution due to the treaty; the importation of falsely classified goods; computer crime; and any felony violation of the Foreign Agents Registration Act of 1938. Section 320 allows the forfeiture of any property within the jurisdiction of the United States that was gained as the result of an offense against a foreign nation that involves the manufacture, importation, sale, or distribution of a controlled substance. Section 323 amended the means by which a foreign nation may seek to have a forfeiture or judgement notification enforced by a district court of the United States by adding a new paragraph that specifies how the U.S. government may apply for a restraining order to preserve the availability of property which is subject to a foreign forfeiture or confiscation judgement. A large emphasis is also placed on the ability of a foreign court to follow due process when considering an application for a forfeiture or confiscation judgement to be registered and enforced in the U.S. Section 328 requires the Secretary of Treasury to take all reasonable steps to encourage foreign governments to require the inclusion of the name of the originator in wire transfer instructions sent to the United States and other countries, with the information to remain with the transfer from its origination until the point of disbursement. Under section 330 the Secretary is also ordered to encourage international cooperation in investigations of money laundering, financial crimes, and the finances of terrorist groups.

=== Corruption ===
Section 329 introduced criminal penalties for corrupt officialdom. An official or employee of the government who acts corruptly — as well as the person who induces the corrupt act — in the carrying out of their official duties will be fined by an amount that is not more than three times the monetary equivalent of the bribe in question. Alternatively they may be imprisoned for not more than 15 years, or they may be fined and imprisoned. Penalties apply to financial institutions who do not comply with an order to terminate any corresponding accounts within 10 days of being so ordered by the Attorney General or the Secretary of Treasury under Section 319. The financial institution can be fined $US10,000 for each day the account remains open after the 10-day limit has expired.

== Subtitle B—Bank Secrecy Act Amendments and Related Improvements ==
Subtitle B largely modifies the Bank Secrecy Act in an attempt to make it harder for money launderers to operate, and to make it easier for law enforcement and regulatory agencies to police money laundering operations. The BSA was amended to allow the designated officer or agency who receives suspicious activity reports to notify U.S. intelligence agencies. It also addresses issues of record keeping and reporting by making it easier to undertake the reporting of suspicious transactions; by making it a requirement that financial institutions report suspicious transactions; through the creation of anti-money laundering programs and by better defining anti-money laundering strategy; and by making it a requirement that anyone who does business file a report for any coin and foreign currency receipts that are over US$10,000. The subtitle increases civil and criminal penalties for money laundering and introduces penalties for violations of geographic targeting orders and certain recordkeeping requirements. Subtitle B also legislated for the creation of a secure network, improved protection of U.S. Federal reserve banks and instructed United States Executive Directors of international financial institutions to support any country that has taken action to support the U.S.'s war on terrorism.

=== Record keeping and reporting ===
A number of measures were taken to improve record keeping and reporting. Section 351 amended the BSA to give financial institutions legal immunity from liability for any disclosures of suspicious transactions or activities to appropriate authorities, or for failing to notify any person identified in such a disclosure, and prohibits this disclosure from being made public. The Federal Deposit Insurance Act was amended by section 355 to allow written employment references to contain suspicions of involvement in illegal activity in response to a request from another financial institution, but makes clear that it does not require the disclosure or shield from liability anyone who makes a disclosure that is found to have been made with malicious intent.

Section 356 made the U.S. Department of Treasury establish regulations that require brokers and dealers registered with the Securities and Exchange Commission (SEC) under the Securities Exchange Act of 1934 to submit Suspicious activity reports (SARs) when they see suspicious activity. Section 355 also specified that a report be produced jointly by the Secretary of Treasury, the Board of Governors of the Federal Reserve System, and the Securities and Exchange Commission with recommendations for effective regulations to apply the requirements of the BSA with regards to investment companies. After defining what was meant by "investment companies", the final report found that certain types of investment companies were more susceptible to money laundering than other types of investment companies — in particular it found that mutual funds and hedge funds are most vulnerable, and that closed-end funds, interval funds, commodity pools, private equity funds, venture capital funds and Real Estate Investment Trusts (REITs), for various reasons, were not as vulnerable to money laundering or particularly attractive to money launderers. The final conclusion FinCEN came to in the report was that as there were so many types of investment companies they should apply the same definition to all investment companies except commodity pools and those funds that only primarily invest in real estate. Due to the broad scope of such a definition it was further narrowed to those investment companies that permit an investor to redeem part of their investment within two years after the investment was made; exclude investment companies with less than US$1,000,000 in assets by the end of the calendar quarter; and exclude funds that were organised in the U.S., that are organised or sponsored by a U.S. person, or that sells ownership interest to U.S. people.

Section 359 brought Money Services Businesses (MSBs) — those who operate informal value transfer systems outside of the mainstream financial system — under the definition of a financial institution. This makes it easier for authorities to regulate and investigate anti-money laundering operations in this segment of the U.S. economy. A report was also ordered to determine whether additional legislation was required for MSBs, but this found that more legislation was not necessary. However, the report did find that law enforcement and regulatory communities should undertake a comprehensive program to enhance their knowledge concerning the range of mechanisms used in informal value transfer systems in order to better understand them and to determine whether they think that any additional legislation is needed.

Section 365 amends the BSA and makes it a requirement of anyone who does business file to file a report to FinCEN for any coin and foreign currency receipts that are over US$10,000. It also makes it illegal to structure transactions in a manner that evades the BSA's reporting requirements. Section 366 ordered a study into why there were too many Currency Transaction Reports (also known as CTRs). There were so many filed in the 2002 financial year (12.3 million were filed and only 118,678 CTR exemptions were made) that Congress was concerned that it was adversely affecting the effectiveness of law enforcement agencies. The study found that businesses were filing unnecessary reports for several reasons, and made various recommendations that might alleviate the problem. Among them, it recommends that FinCEN should work with the federal bank regulators, as well as banks, to reduce, as appropriate, fear of adverse regulatory consequences from making incorrect exemption determinations, including issuing an Advisory encouraging the use of the exemption process.

=== Anti Money Laundering programs and strategy ===
Two sections in subtitle B deal with the U.S. government's anti-money laundering programs and strategy. The BSA was amended by section 352 to make financial institutions implement anti money laundering programs. Institutions must implement, at a minimum, the development of internal policies, procedures, and controls; the designation of a compliance officer; an ongoing employee training program; and an independent audit function to test programs. The Secretary of the Treasury is given authority to set minimum standards of these programs but may exempt from the application of those standards any financial institution that is not subject to the provisions of the rules contained in part 103 of title 31, of the Code of Federal Regulations. The section also orders the Secretary of Treasury to produce regulations "commensurate with the size, location, and activities of the financial institutions to which such regulations apply". These regulations were jointly produced by FinCEN and U.S. Treasury as 31 C.F.R. 103.137 on December 5, 2001 and largely focus on requiring insurance companies to form anti-money laundering programs — depository institutions were not targeted because the Bank Secrecy Act already requires them to have anti-money laundering programs.

The BSA specifies that "the President, acting through the Secretary and in consultation with the Attorney General, shall develop a national strategy for combating money laundering and related financial crimes.". In the development of that strategy, the legislation gives a list of areas that address any area the President, acting through the Secretary and in consultation with the Attorney General, considers appropriate. Section 354 added a new area to be addressed in the strategy: "Data concerning money laundering efforts related to the funding of acts of international terrorism, and efforts directed at the prevention, detection, and prosecution of such funding".

=== Penalties ===
Section 353 increased civil and criminal penalties for violations of any orders made under the BSA. Civil and criminal penalties were also increased for violations of regulations prescribed under section 21 of the Federal Deposit Insurance Act and section 123 of Public Law 91-508. Section 123 of Public Law 91-508 specifies regulations that govern recordkeeping for uninsured banks or institutions, or any other institution defined in 12 U.S.C. § 1953(b), while section 21 of the Federal Deposit Insurance Act specifies regulations that govern recordkeeping for insured depository institutions. The section also lengthens the effective period of geographic targeting orders from 60 days to 180 days.

Section 363 gave the Secretary of Treasury the authority to issue money penalties in an amount equal to not less than 2 times the amount of the transaction, but not more than US$500,000, on any financial institution or agency who commits a civil or criminal violation of International counter money laundering measures.

=== Secure network ===
Under section 362, the U.S. Secretary of Treasury was charged with establishing a highly secure network to allow financial reports required under the BSA, chapter 2 of Public Law 91-508 or section 21 of the Federal Deposit Insurance Act to be filed electronically. The legislation also requires the secure network to send alerts and other information in relation to suspicious activities to financial institutions. The network was required to be finished within 9 months of the enactment of the Patriot Act. According to the testimony of Dennis Lormel, Chief of the Terrorist Financing Operations Section of the FBI's Counterterrorism Division, the USA Patriot Act Communication System was developed by FinCEN from such requirements.

=== Protection of Federal Reserve facilities ===
Under section 364 the Board of Governors of the Federal Reserve System are given authority to authorize personnel to act as law enforcement officers to protect the premises, grounds, property and personnel of any U.S. Federal reserve bank, as well as any operations conducted by or on behalf of the Board. The Board may also delegate this authority to a U.S. Federal reserve bank, so long as the reserve bank makes sure they follow the regulations proscribed by the Board and which are approved by the U.S. Attorney General. Law enforcement personnel are authorised to carry firearms and to make arrests for felonies committed while on the grounds or within the buildings of the Board or a reserve bank. Law enforcement officers must have successfully completed law enforcement training and be authorised to carry firearms and make arrests.

=== Other Bank Secrecy Act provisions ===
Several other BSA provisions were reviewed and amended. Section 357 specified that a report be made on the feasibility and necessity of shifting the processing of information that is reported to the Department of the Treasury (under the provisions of the BSA) to facilities other than those managed by the United States Internal Revenue Service (IRS). The report concluded that in light of the expertise, resources and focus of the IRS, the IRS should continue to perform the information processing and examination functions, and that the IRS was in the best position to manage such processing due to their extensive experience and excellent track-record in administering the BSA since the 1970s.

Several amendments to the BSA were made under section 358. An amendment was made to allow a designated officer or agency who receives suspicious transaction reports to notify U.S. intelligence agencies. The stated purposes of the BSA, Section 123(a) of Public Law 91-508 and Section 21(a) of the Federal Deposit Insurance Act were amended to allow reports or records to be provided to agencies who conduct intelligence or counterintelligence activities, including analysis, in order to protect against international terrorism. It was also amended to direct the Secretary of Treasury to make available reports to agencies, U.S. intelligence, or self-regulatory organisations that are registered with the Securities and Exchange Commission or the Commodity Futures Trading Commission upon the request of the head of that agency or organisation. Exemptions for disclosure are made for circumstances covered under the Privacy Act of 1974.

Several similar amendments were also made to other Acts. An amendment was made to the Right to Financial Privacy Act of 1978 to allow financial records obtained under the Act to be transferred to another agency if they are relevant to intelligence or counter-intelligence activities related to international terrorism. None of the special procedures spelt out in the Financial Privacy Act under section 1114 apply to U.S. government authorities who conduct investigations or intelligence or counter-intelligence activities in relation to domestic or international terrorism. Financial records that are obtained under a subpoena from a Federal grand jury can now also be used for the purposes of counter-terrorism The Fair Credit Reporting Act was amended to require consumer reporting agencies provide customer reports of a customer and all other information in a customer's file available to a government agency that is authorised to conduct counter-terrorism activities when presented with a written certificate by the agency. The consumer agency may not disclose to anyone that they have provided such information to the agency who requested the information. The consumer reporting agency, and any employee of the agency, is given safe harbor for providing such information, if it can be proven that it was done in good faith.

=== Financial crimes enforcement network ===
FinCEN was made a bureau of the United States Department of Treasury. It spells out the duties of the director of the bureau and makes it the responsibility of the Secretary of the Treasury to establish and maintain operating procedures with respect to the government-wide data access service and the financial crimes communications center maintained by FinCEN.

=== Voice and vote ===
Under section 360, the United States President is given authority to instruct any United States Executive Directors of the international financial institutions (for example, the International Monetary Fund and the World Bank) to use their authority (termed "voice and vote") to support any loan or other utilization of the funds of respective institutions for countries that have shown to "take actions that contribute to efforts of the United States to respond to, deter, or prevent acts of international terrorism". The Secretary of Treasury is also given the authority to instruct the Executive Directors to aggressively use the voice and vote of the Executive Director to require an auditing of disbursements made from their institutions to ensure that no funds are paid to persons who commit, threaten to commit, or support terrorism.

== Subtitle C—Currency Crimes and Protection ==
Subtitle C deals with a number of crimes relating to currency. It attempts to prevent bulk cash smuggling and allows for forfeiture in currency reporting cases. It also introduces a number of measures to deal with counterfeiting. the BSA was amended to clarify extraterritorial jurisdiction matters.

=== Bulk cash smuggling into or out of the United States ===
Under section 371 of the Patriot Act, Congress found that currency reporting under the Bank Secrecy Act (BSA) was significant in forcing money launders to avoid traditional financial institutions to launder money and had forced them to use cash-based businesses to avoid traditional financial institutions. Due to this avoidance, large amounts of currency in bulk form (bank notes, etc.) is now moved out of the U.S. by money launderers and into foreign financial institutions or sold on the black market. In fact, bulk currency was found to have become the most popular form of money laundering for moving large amounts of cash in an evasive manner. Due to this finding, a new effort was made to stop the laundering of money through bulk currency movements, mainly focusing on the confiscation of criminal proceeds and the increase in penalties for money laundering. Congress found that a criminal offense of merely evading the reporting of money transfers was insufficient and decided that it would be better if the smuggling of the bulk currency itself was the offense.

Therefore, a new section was appended to the BSA that made it a criminal offense to evade currency reporting by concealing more than US$10,000 on any person or through any luggage, merchandise or other container that moves into or out of the U.S.. The penalty for such an offense is up to 5 years imprisonment and the forfeiture of any property up to the amount that was being smuggled. The procedures that cover the seizure and forfeiture of such property are specified under section 413 of the Controlled Substances Act. If the defendant has insufficient assets to allow the court to seize enough substitute property to cover the amount being smuggled, then the court is authorized to make a personal money judgement up to the amount to be forfeited.

=== Forfeiture in currency reporting cases ===
The BSA was amended by section 372 of the Patriot Act to make the civil and criminal penalty violations of currency reporting cases be the forfeiture of all a defendant's property that was involved in the offense, and any property traceable to the defendant.

=== Illegal money transmitting businesses ===
Section 1960 of title 18 of the United States Code, was amended by section 373 of the Patriot Act. Previously it prohibited and penalized illegal money transmitting businesses, but it now prohibits and gives similar penalties for unlicensed money transmitting businesses. This section was used to prosecute Yehuda Abraham for helping to arrange money transfers for British arms dealer Hermant Lakhani, who was arrested in August 2003 after being caught in a government sting. Lakhani had tried to sell a missile to an FBI agent posing as a Somali militant.

=== Counterfeiting domestic and foreign currency and obligations ===
Due to section 374 of the Patriot Act, the definition of domestic counterfeiting now encompasses analog, digital, or electronic image reproductions and the penalties are set out in various parts of the U.S. Code. Penalties for domestic counterfeiting were increased to 20 years imprisonment for the counterfeiting of obligations or securities, and also for passing off counterfeited currency. It also makes it an offense to own an analog, digital, or electronic image of any obligation or other security of the United States, to make an impression of tools that are used to make such an obligation or possess or sell impressions of tools used for obligations or securities. The penalties for such violations of the law are severe: offenders will be imprisoned for up to 25 years. The law also considers connecting parts of different notes to be a counterfeiting offense, and the Patriot Act increased the penalty from 5 years imprisonment to 10 years. The Act also increases the penalty from 5 years imprisonment to 10 years for counterfeiting bonds and obligations of certain domestic lending agencies.

Similar changes were made under section 375 to foreign obligations and currency. Previously, penalties for counterfeiting the bonds, certificates, obligations, or other securities of a foreign nation were a maximum five years of imprisonment. This was changed to 20 years in jail. Penalties for uttering counterfeit foreign obligations or securities were also extended from 5 years imprisonment to 20 years. A penalty was added to 18 U.S.C. § 481 for those who manufacture or own plates, stones, or analog, digital, or electronic images for counterfeiting foreign obligations or securities, and the penalties for violating the section was extended from five years to 20 years imprisonment. Anyone caught manufacturing or uttering foreign bank notes will be penalised with 20 years imprisonment.

=== Laundering the proceeds of terrorism ===
Section 376 modified 18 U.S.C. § 1956, which makes unlawful the laundering of monetary instruments, to include the provision of material support or resources to designated foreign terrorist organizations in its definition of "unlawful activity".

=== Extraterritorial jurisdiction ===
The U.S. Code was amended by section 377. This now states that anybody who undertakes a fraudulent action, and anyone who conspires with that person, outside the jurisdiction of the United States which would be an offense in the U.S. will be prosecuted under 18 U.S.C. § 1029, which deals with fraud and related activity in connection with access devices. This only applies if

- the offense involves an access device issued, owned, managed, or controlled by a financial institution, account issuer, credit card system member, or other entity within the jurisdiction of the United States;
- and the person transports, delivers, conveys, transfers to or through, or otherwise stores, secrets, or holds within the jurisdiction of the United States, any article used to assist in the commission of the offense or the proceeds of such offense or property derived therefrom.
