= Domestic Security Enhancement Act of 2003 =

The Domestic Security Enhancement Act of 2003 was draft legislation written by United States Department of Justice during the George W. Bush administration, under the tenure of United States Attorney General John Ashcroft. The Center for Public Integrity obtained a copy of the draft marked "confidential" on February 7, 2003, and posted it on its Web site along with commentary. It was sometimes called Patriot II, after the USA PATRIOT Act, which was enacted in 2001. It was never introduced to the United States Congress.

The draft version of the bill would have expanded the powers of the United States federal government while simultaneously curtailing judicial review of these powers. Members of the United States Congress said that they had not seen the drafts, though the documents obtained by the CPI indicated that Speaker of the United States House of Representatives Dennis Hastert and Vice President Dick Cheney had received copies.

Provisions of the draft version included:

- Removal of court-ordered prohibitions against police agencies spying on domestic groups.
- The Federal Bureau of Investigation would be granted powers to conduct searches and surveillance based on intelligence gathered in foreign countries without first obtaining a court order.
- Creation of a DNA database of suspected terrorists.
- Prohibition of any public disclosure of the names of alleged terrorists including those who have been arrested.
- Exemptions from civil liability for people and businesses who voluntarily turn private information over to the government.
- Criminalization of the use of encryption to conceal incriminating communications.
- Automatic denial of bail for persons accused of terrorism-related crimes, reversing the ordinary common law burden of proof principle. Persons charged with terrorists acts would be required to demonstrate why they should be released on bail rather than the government being required to demonstrate why they should be held.
- Expansion of the list of crimes eligible for the death penalty.
- The Environmental Protection Agency would be prevented from releasing "worst-case scenario" information to the public about chemical plants.
- United States citizens whom the government finds to be either members of, or providing material support to, terrorist groups could have their citizenship revoked and be deported to foreign countries.

Some provisions of this act have been tacked onto other bills such as the Senate Spending bill and subsequently passed.

The American Civil Liberties Union and the Bill of Rights Defense Committee have all been vocal opponents of the PATRIOT Act of 2001, the proposed (as of 2003) PATRIOT 2 Act, and other associated legislation made in response to the threat of domestic terrorism that it believes violates either the letter and/or the spirit of the U.S. Bill of Rights.

On January 31, 2006, the Center for Public Integrity published a story on its website that claimed that this proposed legislation undercut the Bush administration's legal rationale of its NSA wiretapping program.

== See also ==
- ADVISE
- National security
- United States Bill of Rights
- COINTELPRO
- Bill C-51 (41st Canadian Parliament, 2nd Session)
