= Shell bank =

Financial institution without a physical presence

A shell bank is a financial institution that does not have a physical presence in any country, and is not subject to supervision by a banking authority (not regulated). In order to prevent money laundering, Subtitle A of the USA PATRIOT Act specifically prohibits such institutions, with the exception of shell banks that are affiliate (under the control) of a bank that has a physical presence in the U.S. or if the foreign shell bank is subject to supervision by a banking authority in the non-U.S. country regulating the affiliated depository institution, credit union, or foreign bank.

== Provisions ==
The USA PATRIOT Act includes specific provisions designed to limit the use of correspondent accounts for money laundering activity. These provisions are contained in sections 312, 313 and 319(b) and involve limitations on shell bank relationships as well as enhanced due diligence and record keeping requirements.

== Implementation ==
On 2002-11-28, final regulations (31 CFR 103.177 and 103.185) implementing section 313 and 319(b) of the US Patriot Act became effective. The regulations implement provisions of the BSA (Bank Secrecy Act) that relate to foreign corresponded accounts.
