= Concentration account =

Type of account used by financial institutions

A concentration account is a sole account used for the internal purposes of a financial institution to facilitate the processing and settlement of multiple or individual customer transactions within the institution, usually on the same day. Such accounts can lead to the concealment by financial institutions of transactions made by customers. However section 325 of Title III of the USA PATRIOT Act banned their use for such purposes by prohibiting financial institutions from allowing clients to direct transactions that move their funds into, out of, or through the concentration accounts of the financial institution; and prohibit the financial institutions from informing clients about the existence of such accounts and disallows any disclosure that may allow a customer a way of identifying such accounts that the financial institution may use. Section 325 also requires that financial institutions document and follow methods of identifying where the funds are for each customer in a concentration account that comingles funds belonging to one or more customers.
