= Consulate shopping =

Practice for finding favourable visa application outcomes

Consulate shopping is the practice of applying for visas at different consulate posts - or choosing a more "suitable" post in advance, in the hope of finding one that will be more sympathetic to the applicant and thus approve the visa, or in order to have one's application processed faster. It was typically associated with making a visa application at a visa office located outside of one's home country.

The term "consulate shopping" may have appeared by analogy with "forum shopping" - choosing the best jurisdiction for litigation.

In the past, "consulate shopping" was not an uncommon practice for both visitor and permanent resident visas. For example, a Russian citizen would choose to apply for a visitor visa to the US at a US consulate somewhere in Eastern Europe, rather than one in Russia, based on the belief that, due to different office cultures of the consular staff, the likelihood of rejection would be lower, say, in Budapest than in Moscow. Similarly, a person planning a trip to mainland China may plan on obtaining his or her visitor's visa in a visa office in Hong Kong, immediately before entering the mainland, instead of doing it in advance in their own home country.

When applying for permanent residence in Canada, a person living in India, but possessing a multiple entry visitor visa to the UK or a Schengen country could choose to file his application with a Canadian visa office in European, rather than one in India, because the posted processing times were supposed to be much shorter in Europe.

Lately, many countries cut down on the practice of consulate shopping by requiring that permanent residence visa applications, and often visitor visa applications as well, be filed only in visa offices within the country of the applicant's citizenship of residence. As of the summer 2008 People's Republic of China joined this trend, requiring all visa applicants only to apply in the Chinese consulate in the country where they are citizens or permanent residents; moreover, in some countries served by multiple consulates (as the USA is), the application must be filed in the consular district serving the area where the applicant resides.

An important exception to that trend is that as of July 2010 the U.S. Consulates in China have liberalized their appointment policy. Now, persons who reside in Mainland China can choose to apply for a nonimmigrant visa at any of the Mainland posts—Beijing, Guangzhou, Shanghai, or Shenyang.
