= Geographic targeting order =

A Geographic targeting order (or GTO) is an order issued by the United States Secretary of Treasury requiring any United States domestic financial institutions that exist within a geographic area to report on transactions any greater than a specified value. GTOs are defined in the Bank Secrecy Act in 31 U.S.C. § 5326(a). They only last for a limited period of time — originally each order lasted 60 days however section 353 of the USA PATRIOT Act extended such orders to 180 days.
