= Payable-through account =

Deposit account type in the US

A payable-through account (PTA) is a demand deposit account through which banking agencies located in the United States extend cheque writing privileges to the customers of other institutions, often foreign banks.

PTA accounts are a concern to bank regulators because the banks or agencies providing the accounts may not subject the end customers to the same level of scrutiny as they would their own customers. These concerns were addressed in Title 3A, especially Section 311(b)(4), of the Patriot Act.

Foreign financial institutions use PTAs, also known as "pass-through" or "pass-by" accounts, to provide their customers with access to the U.S. banking system. Some U.S. banks, Edge and agreement corporations, and U.S. branches and agencies of foreign financial institutions (collectively referred to as U.S. banks) offer these accounts as a service to foreign financial institutions. Law enforcement authorities have stated that the risk of money laundering and other illicit activities is higher in PTAs that are not adequately controlled.

Risk Factors

PTAs may be prone to higher risk because U.S. banks do not typically implement the same due diligence requirements for PTAs that they require of domestic customers who want to open checking and other accounts. For example, some U.S. banks merely request a copy of signature cards completed by the payable through customers (the customer of the foreign financial institution). These U.S. banks then process thousands of sub-accountholder checks and other transactions, including currency deposits, through the foreign financial institution's PTA. In most cases, little or no independent effort is expended to obtain or confirm information about the individual and business subaccountholders that use the PTAs.

Foreign financial institutions’ use of PTAs, coupled with inadequate oversight by U.S. banks, may facilitate unsound banking practices, including money laundering and related criminal activities. The potential for facilitating money laundering or terrorist financing, OFAC violations, and other serious crimes increases when a U.S. bank is unable to identify and adequately understand the transactions of the ultimate users (all or most of whom are outside of the United States) of its account with a foreign correspondent. PTAs used for illegal purposes can cause banks serious financial losses in criminal and civil fines and penalties, seizure or forfeiture of collateral, and reputation damage.

Risk Mitigation

U.S. banks offering PTA services should develop and maintain adequate policies, procedures, and processes to guard against possible illicit use of these accounts. At a minimum, policies, procedures, and processes should enable each U.S. bank to identify the ultimate users of its foreign financial institution PTA and should include the bank's obtaining (or having the ability to obtain through a trusted third-party arrangement) substantially the same information on the ultimate PTA users as it obtains on its direct customers.

Policies, procedures, and processes should include a review of the foreign financial institution's processes for identifying and monitoring the transactions of subaccountholders and for complying with any AML statutory and regulatory requirements existing in the host country and the foreign financial institution's master agreement with the U.S. bank. In addition, U.S. banks should have procedures for monitoring transactions conducted in foreign financial institutions’ PTAs.

In an effort to address the risk inherent in PTAs, U.S. banks should have a signed contract (i.e., master agreement) that includes:

Roles and responsibilities of each party. Limits or restrictions on transaction types and amounts (e.g., currency deposits, funds transfers, check cashing). Restrictions on types of subaccountholders (e.g., casas de cambio, finance companies, funds remitters, or other non-bank financial institutions). Prohibitions or restrictions on multi-tier subaccountholders.193 Access to the foreign financial institution's internal documents and audits that pertain to its PTA activity. U.S. banks should consider closing the PTA in the following circumstances:

Insufficient information on the ultimate PTA users. Evidence of substantive or ongoing suspicious activity. Inability to ensure that the PTAs are not being used for money laundering or other illicit purposes.

A full explanation from the Federal Deposit Insurance Corporation is available at: http://www.fdic.gov/news/news/financial/1995/fil9530.html
