= Money Laundering Control Act =

1986 law that made money laundering a federal crime in the United States

- Other short titles: Alcohol and Drug Abuse Amendments of 1986; Money Laundering Control Act of 1986
- Long title: An Act to strengthen Federal efforts to encourage foreign cooperation in eradicating illicit drug crops and in halting international drug traffic, to improve enforcement of Federal drug laws and enhance interdiction of illicit drug shipments, to provide strong Federal leadership in establishing effective drug abuse prevention and education programs, to expand Federal support for drug abuse treatment and rehabilitation efforts, and for other purposes.
- Nicknames: Anti-Drug Abuse Act of 1986
- Enacted by: the 99th United States Congress
- Effective: October 27, 1986

Citations
- Public law: 99-570
- Statutes at Large: 100 Stat. 3207 aka 100 Stat. 3207-18

Codification
- Titles amended: 18 U.S.C.: Crimes and Criminal Procedure
- U.S.C. sections created: 18 U.S.C. ch. 46 § 981; 18 U.S.C. ch. 95 § 1956-1957
- U.S.C. sections amended: 18 U.S.C. ch. 96 § 1961

Legislative history
- Introduced in the House as H.R. 5484 by James C. Wright Jr. (D–TX) on September 8, 1986; Committee consideration by House Armed Services, House Banking, Finance, and Urban Affairs, House Education and Labor, House Foreign Affairs, House Government Operations, House Energy and Commerce, House Interior and Insular Affairs, House Judiciary, House Merchant Marine and Fisheries, House Post Office and Civil Service, House Public Works and Transportation, House Ways and Means; Passed the House on September 11, 1986 (392-16); Passed the Senate on September 30, 1986 (97-2, in lieu of S. 2878) with amendment; House agreed to Senate amendment on October 17, 1986 (unanimous consent) with further amendment; Senate agreed to House amendment on October 17, 1986 (voice vote); Signed into law by President Ronald Reagan on October 27, 1986

Major amendments
- USA PATRIOT Act

The Money Laundering Control Act of 1986 (Public Law 99-570) is a United States Act of Congress that made money laundering a federal crime. It was passed in 1986. It consists of two sections, 18 U.S.C. § 1956 and 18 U.S.C. § 1957. It for the first time in the United States criminalized money laundering. Section 1956 prohibits individuals from engaging in a financial transaction with proceeds that were generated from certain specific crimes, known as "specified unlawful activities" (SUAs). Additionally, the law requires that an individual specifically intends in making the transaction to conceal the source, ownership or control of the funds. There is no minimum threshold of money, nor is there the requirement that the transaction succeed in actually disguising the money. Moreover, a "financial transaction" has been broadly defined, and need not involve a financial institution, or even a business. Merely passing money from one person to another, so long as it is done with the intent to disguise the source, ownership, location or control of the money, has been deemed a financial transaction under the law. Section 1957 prohibits spending in excess of $10,000 derived from an SUA, regardless of whether the individual wishes to disguise it. This carries a lesser penalty than money laundering, and unlike the money laundering statute, requires that the money pass through a financial institution.

== Money Laundry Prevention Officers ==
- In France: ACPR & AMF
- In Germany: Pequris.
- In Spain:
- In USA: IMLPO

== See also ==
- Operation Protect Our Children
- Housing and Community Development Act of 1992
