= Caribbean Financial Action Task Force =

The Caribbean Financial Action Task Force (CFATF) is an organization of states and territories of the Caribbean Basin that have agreed to implement common counter-measures against money laundering. CFATF has associate status within the Financial Action Task Force on Money Laundering (FATF).

== History ==
The CFATF was established as the result of two key meetings convened in Aruba in and Jamaica. In Aruba in 1990 representatives of Caribbean and Central American countries developed a general approach to the problem of the laundering of criminal proceeds and made 19 recommendations.

A meeting of ministers held in Kingston, Jamaica, in 1992, resulted in the Kingston Declaration, endorsing the commitment of the member states to implementing the recommendations and coordinating the implementation through establishment of the CFATF Secretariat.

== Member states ==
Members of CFATF are:

- Anguilla
- Antigua and Barbuda
- Aruba
- Barbados
- Belize
- Bermuda
- Cayman Islands
- Curaçao
- Dominica
- Dominican Republic
- El Salvador
- Grenada
- Guatemala
- Guyana
- Haiti
- Jamaica
- Montserrat
- Saint Kitts and Nevis
- Saint Lucia
- Saint Vincent and the Grenadines
- Sint Maarten
- Suriname
- The Bahamas
- Trinidad and Tobago
- Turks and Caicos Islands
- Venezuela
- Virgin Islands

== See also ==
- Asia/Pacific Group on Money Laundering
- Correspondent account
- Digital renminbi
- FATF blacklist
- United Nations Office on Drugs and Crime
