= International asset recovery =

Efforts by governments to repatriate the proceeds of corruption

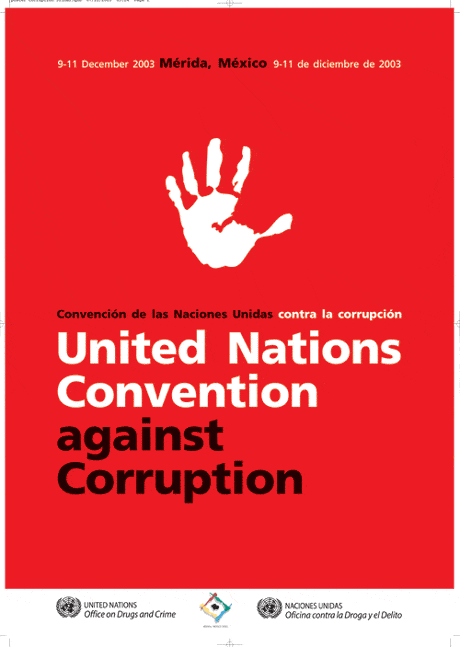
Chapter V of the United Nations Convention against Corruption (2003) makes clear that Asset Recovery is an international priority in the fight against corruption.

International asset recovery is any effort by governments to repatriate the proceeds of corruption hidden in foreign jurisdictions. Such assets may include monies in bank accounts, real estate, vehicles, arts and artifacts, and precious metals. As defined under the United Nations Convention against Corruption, asset recovery refers to recovering the proceeds of corruption, rather than broader terms such as asset confiscation or asset forfeiture which refer to recovering the proceeds or instrumentalities of crime in general.

Often used to emphasize the "multi-jurisdictional" or cross-border aspects of a corruption investigation, international asset recovery includes numerous processes such as the tracing, freezing, confiscation, and repatriation of proceeds stored in foreign jurisdictions, thus "making it one of the most complex projects in the field of law". Even considering the difficulties present, Africa specialist Daniel Scher counters that international asset recovery's "potential rewards in developing countries make it a highly attractive undertaking".

Despite domestic legislation in some countries allowing for the confiscation and forfeiture of proceeds of corruption, it is improvements in finance, transportation, and communications technologies in the 20th century that have made it easier for corrupt leaders and other "politically exposed persons" to conceal massive amounts of stolen wealth in offshore financial centers.

By taking advantage of differences in legal systems, the high costs in coordinating investigations, lack of international cooperation, and bank secrecy in some recipient countries, corrupt officials have been able to preserve much of their loot overseas.

== Social impact ==
Recovering stolen assets is important for a variety of reasons. According to the World Bank, the cross-border flow of proceeds from criminal activity, corruption and tax evasion is estimated between US$1–1.6 trillion per year—half of this amount is looted from developing and transition economies. US $20–40 billion of this flow originated in bribes to public officials from developing and transition countries. A 2005 report by the Commission for Africa cites a European Commission estimate that "stolen African assets equivalent to more than half of the continent's external debt are held in foreign banks accounts". As stated by the World Bank in 2004, "corruption is... the single greatest obstacle to economic and social development. Corruption undermines development by distorting the rule of law and weakening the institutional foundation on which economic growth depends. The harmful effects of corruption are especially severe on the world's poorest, who are most reliant on the provision of public services, and are least capable of paying the extra costs associated with fraud and corruption".

== Deterrence to future corruption ==
Several countries, especially economically deprived nations, have endured the brunt of systemic corruption as their public wealth illegally flowed into bank accounts and properties in developed countries and offshore financial centres. Successful conviction of criminals and/or confiscation of their assets creates a strong deterrent for potential corrupt officials that there is no safe haven for hiding illicit wealth.

== Current feasibility ==
Successes in recent years in recovering billions of dollars of stolen assets has demonstrated that asset recovery is feasible. For example, by 2005 Nigeria had recovered $1.2 billion stolen by former President Sani Abacha by requesting assistance from multiple jurisdictions including Switzerland, Jersey, and Liechtenstein. To recover Nigerian assets, the Swiss government designated the Abacha family a "criminal organization", allowing it to bypass the need for a conviction.

Additionally, asset recovery was recognized as "a fundamental principle" of the UNCAC. The signing and ratification of the UNCAC by over 160 countries is seen as a major step in furthering cooperation between countries to join forces to fight corruption and assist each other in recovering looted assets. Legal precedents, increasing international cooperation, as well as enhanced capacities make asset recovery more possible now than ever.

== The asset recovery process ==
Managing the stages of an asset recovery investigation can be extremely time consuming, complex and requires a great deal of resources, expertise, and political will. First, a victim country must succeed in tracing the stolen assets. Second, the victim country must request cooperation from authorities in the jurisdictions where the assets reside to seize the assets; these requests usually come in the form of a Mutual Legal Assistance request or a letter rogatory, though some common law countries allow the filing of a Mareva injunction in civil courts to achieve the same end. Third, legal processes must usually be initiated in the requested country in order to confiscate the assets. Following this, requested authorities must repatriate the assets back to the requesting country.

Each of the necessary steps—tracing, freezing, confiscation and repatriation—presents its own unique challenges.

=== Tracing ===
Determining the existence of assets through an exhaustive financial investigation is the first requirement in any asset recovery case. Assets must be followed not only to their final hiding place, but causality must be established between the asset and the criminal activity. This poses a particular challenge when dealing with developing countries that have a cash-based society where monies often do not flow through the recorded financial system, other techniques must be used.

When assets do go through the financial system, tracing from one account to the next will usually leave an audit trail that can be exploited by financial investigators. As stolen assets are often layered through several different accounts and corporate vehicles, investigators will often benefit from outside information such as seized financial documents and suspicious transaction reports filed with banking regulators and other law enforcement agencies. Given the speed that monies can be transferred in the global financial system, identifying and tracing the bank accounts of the perpetrators is not an easy task, even for a seasoned investigator. A high degree of expertise, resources and cooperation between multiple intelligence and law enforcement agencies is essential for successful tracing.

Though not often, occasionally investigators may come across documentation that leads directly to the stolen assets. For example, investigations seeking to trace Ferdinand Marcos' looted billions were greatly accelerated by finding Marcos' bank records in the former presidential palace. Additionally, suspicious activity reports filed with national financial intelligence units can often uncover connections that can expose cases of grand corruption.

To obtain non-public information in foreign jurisdictions requires the submission of either a "Mutual Legal Assistance" (MLA) request, obtain a disclosure action through a tort claim, or submit a traditional letter rogatory through diplomatic channels. These requests are more likely to be successful when all countries involved have treaties in place, either bilateral or multilateral, to allow for legal cooperation. Notably, the UNCAC purports to provide a legal basis for international cooperation for asset recovery.

=== Freezing ===
Once financial investigations have identified assets as being possible proceeds of crime/corruption, freezing those assets becomes critical. However, premature freezing prevents investigators from following the money trail in real time. If alerted, the beneficiaries of targeted assets will most likely try to transfer the assets to make them unreachable. If delayed, there is a risk that the assets may be transferred beyond the investigator's reach. Confidentiality is key at this point. To prevent suspects from moving assets yet to be discovered, courts can place a gag order to prevent banks or officials from informing their clients until a transfer request is made. Recently some banks have also begun proactively cooperating with their national financial intelligence units by requesting consent on suspicious transfers.

In March 2006, a Guernsey branch of Banque Nationale de Paris Paribas refused to transfer funds beneficially controlled by Tommy Suharto and instead froze the funds based on guidance from Guernsey's Financial Services Commission.

=== Confiscation/forfeiture ===
Whether by criminal or civil actions, a judgment is essential to transfer legal ownership of assets already frozen back to the requesting country. See Legal Avenues to Obtaining Judgment below.

=== Repatriation/monitoring ===
There is no standard procedure for the restitution of illicitly acquired assets, as no two cases are exactly alike. Certain cases involving asset recovery have seen difficulties emerge during the repatriation stage. While stolen money is unquestionably the sovereign property of the requesting government, enforcing asset recovery requests is often complex and costly. Often there are complex issues around the claims of legitimate third parties, as corrupt proceeds can be mixed with legitimate income.

Additionally, requested countries and the international community as a whole do not want to see repatriated assets embezzled all over again. Although determining the disposal of assets is handled on a case-by-case basis, the World Bank has acted as a neutral third party to ensure that assets are invested into development efforts such as health and education.

== Legal mechanisms to obtaining judgment ==
Determining the tactic by which an asset recovery practitioner can obtain court judgments to freeze, seize, and repatriate assets is also of critical importance. Generally, there are four approaches which can be taken to recover stolen assets.

=== Criminal confiscation (in personam) ===
Courts have the authority to confiscate assets that have been identified as the proceeds or instrumentalities of crime. In the context of international asset recovery, using criminal convictions to recover stolen assets is usually only possible when a legal basis exists between states, such as a bilateral or multilateral agreement. If no other arrangement is in place, UNCAC signatories may use the Convention itself as a legal basis for enforcing confiscation orders obtained in a foreign criminal court. Specifically, Article 54 Section 1A of the UNCAC provides that: "Each State Party (will)... take such measures as may be necessary to permit its competent authorities to give effect to an order of confiscation issued by a court of another state party."

Indeed, UNCAC Section 54 2A also provides for the provisional freezing or seizing of property where there are sufficient grounds for taking such actions in advance of a formal request being received. Generally, dual criminality must also exist between the jurisdictions, whereby the predicate offense must be recognized as a crime by both the requested and requesting state.

Mutual Legal Assistance (MLA) is vital to this process, although there remain countries that are reluctant to enforce a court order from another jurisdiction without some form of pre-existing treaty. However, MLA requests can generate vital information in the early stages of an investigation in tracing, identifying, and temporarily freezing the accounts linked to corruption.

To be truly effective, international asset recoveries through MLA require strong inter-state cooperation as well as two critical elements—a criminal conviction either in the requesting state or the recipient state, and an enforceable confiscation order.

However, satisfying conditions for international asset recovery using criminal convictions remains problematic. Criminal proceedings usually require that the accused is present before the court, where many wrongdoers may be dead or have fled the country to avoid arrest or prosecution. MLA requests must be detailed and precisely written in the language of the requested state. Additionally, influential and powerful defendants can use their influence to suppress investigations, manipulate witnesses or judges, or hire law firms to create endless adjournments and appeals.

=== Civil proceedings (in personam) ===
States have another option to recover stolen assets—civil proceedings. In relation to foreign assets, a State will bring a private action in the civil courts of the foreign jurisdiction where corruptly acquired assets are located. This is the same process that would be used by private citizens or corporate entities with a claim against another, in the context of fraud for example, by a liquidator seeking to recover assets wrongfully diverted from an insolvent company.

This mechanism has been particularly successful in international cases involving public officials where a criminal conviction of corruption is difficult or impossible to obtain. Among the benefits of civil proceedings include a lower burden of proof ("clear and convincing/balance of probabilities" instead of "beyond a reasonable doubt") and the absence of a defendant not preventing progress in the proceedings. Instead, the court is satisfied so long as the defendant has been properly served notice of the proceedings. In the United Kingdom, the High Court held that serving notice to a lawyer acting on behalf of a defendant has also been used when the individual is in hiding.

Additionally, civil courts retain some of the benefits of a criminal action, for example the ability to freeze assets to prevent dispersal, pierce bank secrecy, issue gag orders to third parties to maintain the confidentiality of the investigation, and even order search/seizure actions. Many practitioners have found that effective programs to recover corruptly acquired assets often use a coordinated package of criminal and civil measures to secure and recover assets. Furthermore, where criminal mechanisms can go some way to freeze but not recover assets, civil proceedings may effectively intervene.

=== Civil procedures against property (in rem) ===
A third tactic is the use of in rem actions, also known as Non-Conviction Based Asset Forfeiture (NCBF) to recover assets directly. This method takes place in a civil court. An advantage of in rem actions is that it does not require either a civil or criminal conviction against an individual in order to confiscate his/her assets. Instead, guilt is assigned to the property and prosecutors must only prove that the property in question was involved in an illegal activity. Hence, a possible case name for in rem action could be 'United States of America vs. US $100,000 in a Toyota Pickup.' The owner or beneficiary of targeted property must then prove that either that the property was not involved or that he/she provide an innocent owner defense.

In rem asset recovery has been controversial and the fairness of the procedures has been questioned. Prior to 2000 in the United States, for example, the burden of proof was on the property owner to prove that his property was not derived from, or used to commit, a criminal offense, and there was no remedy for "innocent owners" who were without fault concerning the illegal use of their property. Remedial legislation enacted in 2000, however, addressed these concerns and Non-Conviction Based Asset Forfeiture has become a standard part of law enforcement in the U.S., yielding US$1.5b annually in asset recoveries. While encouraged in UNCAC, adapting domestic law to create a legal basis for in rem recoveries is not required of state parties. Examples of in rem legislation can be found in jurisdictions such as the United States, the United Kingdom, the Philippines, Australia, Colombia and Ireland.

=== Accion civil resarcitoria (civil action) ===
In civil law jurisdictions, there is a fourth mechanism which is a hybrid between conviction-based and in rem actions. An 'accion civil resarcitoria' is meant to redress victims of criminal offenses and to expedite the process it takes place within the criminal court. Such actions depend on the criminal proceedings in that it cannot be initiated unless there is a concurrent criminal investigation underway. Once the criminal proceedings make it to trial, the accion civil resarcitoria separates in that forfeiture of property is not dependent on a criminal conviction of an individual. Unlike a criminal confiscation or in rem action, a successful 'accion civil resarcitoria' recognizes damages and awards a monetary compensation.

For example, in Switzerland, where foreign States seeking the return of corruptly acquired assets are often permitted to be a civil party to Swiss criminal investigations or proceedings concerning those assets. Such investigations or proceedings may be commenced by an investigating magistrate on receipt of a request for mutual legal assistance. The foreign State will have the ability to access documents on the Court file, to participate in the examination of witnesses, to make submissions to the investigating magistrate, and to seek the repatriation of the assets. This procedure produces an efficient and often effective combination of civil and criminal proceedings.

== International frameworks for asset recovery ==
United Nations Convention against Corruption (2005)

Responding to increasing recognition of the problems caused by public corruption and its devastating effects on the poorest of nations, the international community took a bold step in 2003 by creating and ratifying the United Nations Convention Against Corruption (UNCAC).

The UNCAC came into force on December 14, 2005, and so far has been ratified by over 130 parties. While the UNCAC is not the first international effort to combat corruption, it is innovative in two respects: it is the first treaty to reference the recovery of stolen assets as a priority in the fight against corruption. Second, the treaty also provides a nearly universal multi-lateral platform for mutual legal assistance in corruption related offenses.

OECD Convention on Combating Bribery of Foreign Public Officials in International Business Transactions (1999) - A convention signed by 37 countries, this OECD convention requires that bribery of foreign public officials in the context of international business transactions be criminalized. The framework of the Convention is housed in the OECD Secretariat, but country-level compliance is ensured through a rigorous peer-evaluation mechanism which monitors both the legislative framework and implementation in signatory countries under the auspices of the OECD Working Group on Bribery.

More specifically, the OECD Convention requires that bribery of foreign public officials be punishable, by effective, proportionate and dissuasive criminal penalties comparable to those applicable to their own public officials. It commits Parties to interpret territorial jurisdiction in as broad a manner as possible and to establish nationality jurisdiction if this is in accord with their legal system. Parties are obliged to establish corporate liability (the liability of "legal persons") for foreign bribery, and where a Party's legal system does not provide criminal liability for companies, the Party must apply effective, proportionate and dissuasive non-criminal sanctions to them. Furthermore, countries must facilitate mutual legal assistance and cannot invoke "bank secrecy" to deny mutual legal assistance. While the OECD Convention is important in the sense that it creates the obligation for state parties to criminalize the bribery of foreign public officials, it does not directly consider the recovery of proceeds of corruption.

United Nations Convention against Transnational Organized Crime (2003) The United Nations Convention against Transnational Organized came into force on September 29, 2003, and has been ratified by over 145 countries. The purpose of this Convention is to promote cooperation to prevent and combat transnational organized crime more effectively. It is the main international instrument in the fight against transnational organized crime. Especially relevant to asset recovery is Article 6 of the Convention, which requires state parties to criminalize the laundering the proceeds of crime, and Article 12, which requires parties to create a legal basis for the confiscation of proceeds of crime.

Inter-American Convention Against Corruption (1997)

The Inter-American Convention Against Corruption (IACAC) was adopted by the member countries of the Organization of American States on 29 March 1996; it came into force on 6 March 1997. The IACAC is distinctive in that it was the first international convention to address the problem of corruption.

Currently, the IACAC is ratified by 33 countries.

African Union Convention on Preventing and Combating Corruption and Related Offences (2003)

In the spirit of complementing UNCAC, 35 African Heads of State and Government met in Maputo, Mozambique in July 2003. According to Honorable. Dauda Kamara, Member of the Pan-African Parliament, a specific regional convention was "considered necessary because Africa, given its currently low-level economic development, needed to adopt specific and well defined measures that will protect its vast resources from any further exploitation by more powerful and developed nations of the world through corrupt practices". The Convention was entered into force on August 5, 2006, after the required minimum of 15 signatories was met. To date, 43 countries have signed the Convention and 29 states have ratified it.

== International asset recovery initiatives ==
There are several organizations that have prioritized asset recovery and created initiatives to enable further international cooperation while bringing the issue to the forefront of political and public discussion. These initiatives also include providing technical assistance, research and capacity development to developing countries.

These organizations include but are not limited to:

- United Nations Office on Drugs and Crime (UNODC)
- Stolen Asset Recovery Initiative of the World Bank (StAR)
- International Centre for Asset Recovery (ICAR)
- The International Association for Asset Recovery (IAAR)
- Organisation for Economic Co-operation and Development (OECD)
- Transparency International (TI)
- Financial Action Task Force (FATF)
- Organization for Security and Co-operation in Europe (OSCE)
- U4 Anti-Corruption Resource Center (U4)
- UNCAC Conference of States Parties (UNCAC COSP)

Additionally, several regional networks exist to facilitate judicial cooperation between national authorities by enabling direct personal contact and sharing information. These networks include, but are not limited to:

- Asset Recovery Interagency Network Asia Pacific (ARIN-AP)
- Camden Assets Recovery Interagency Network (CARIN)
- Commonwealth Network of Contact Persons
- Corruption Hunters Network
- European Judicial Network
- Hemispheric Information Exchange Network for Mutual Assistance in Criminal Matters and Extradition of the Organization of American States
- Ibero-American Legal Assistance Network

== Capacity development and training ==
Asset recovery can be a highly complex field of work, requiring expertise, funds, coordinated action and persistence. [COSP Note on AR] Training and technical assistance are sometimes needed to pursue asset recovery cases, particularly in those countries lacking institutional framework and experience.

Several international and inter-governmental organizations with assistance from development agencies and donor countries have begun addressing this challenge. International organizations such as the United Nations Office on Drugs and Crime (UNODC), the World Bank's StAR Initiative and the Swiss-based non-governmental organization International Centre for Asset Recovery have been offering training and capacity development.

Several organizations have taken steps to address the lack of easily accessible, comprehensive and practical information on international asset recovery. This lack of information has been identified as a key problem by a number of countries at the first meeting of the UNCAC Open-Ended Working Group on Asset Recovery held in Vienna in August 2007. The ICAR hosts an online learning platform on asset recovery that includes technical publications, news articles, case studies, and individual country laws. Other organizations such as the StAR Initiative have created in-depth handbooks and manuals to assist practitioners. The United Nations Office on Drugs and Crime (UNODC) offers a free MLA Request Writer Tool. The U4 Help Desk gives practitioners the ability to ask experts any question related to asset recovery/anti-corruption and receive a tailor-made response within 10 working days (or assistance within 48 hours in case of urgency).

== Asset recovery case studies ==
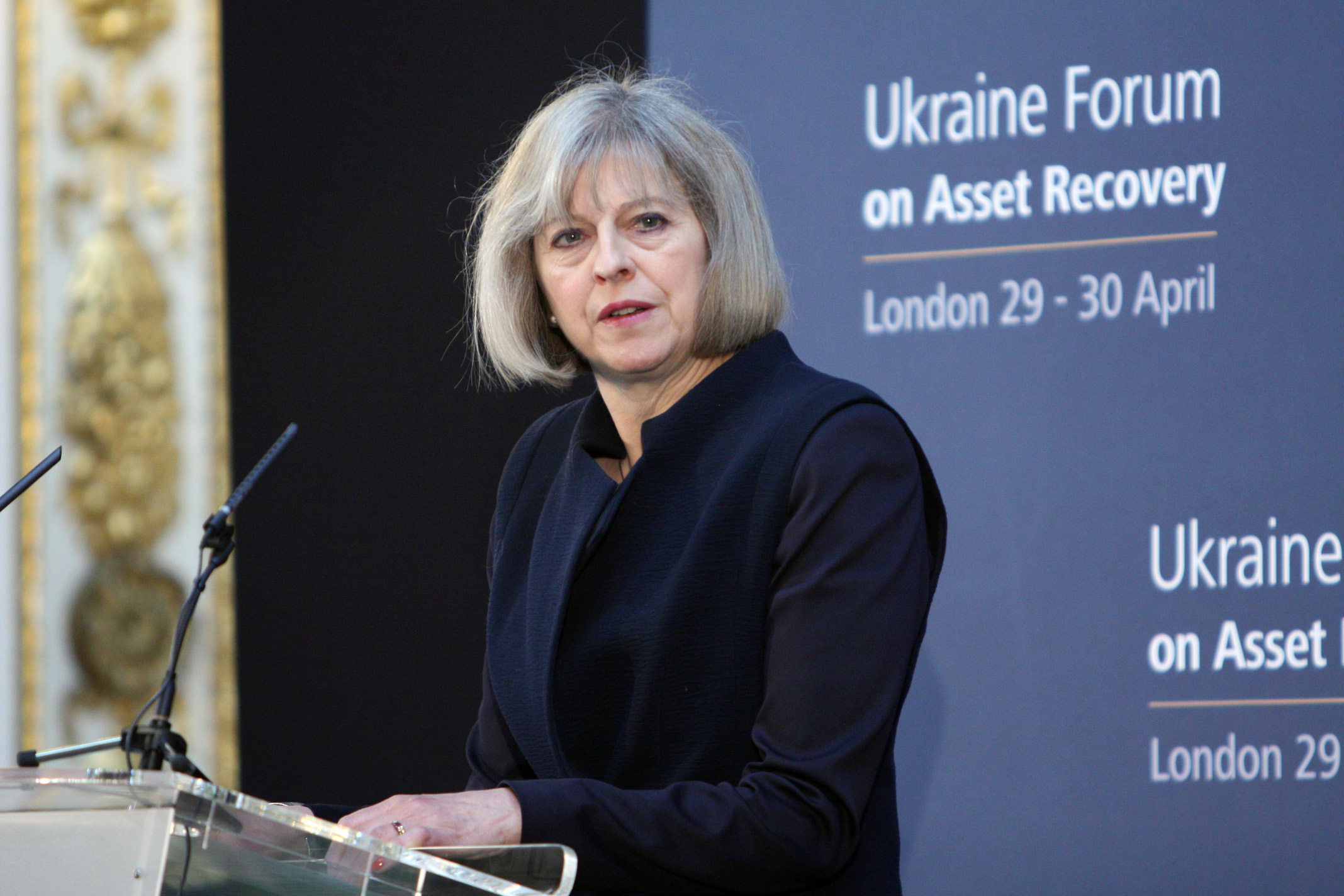
Former prime-minister, then Home Secretary Theresa May at the Ukraine Forum on Asset Recovery in London, 29 April 2014

- Sani Abacha
- Diepreye Alamieyeseigha
- Joshua Dariye
- Jean-Claude "Baby Doc" Duvalier
- Pavlo Lazarenko
- Ao Man Long
- Ferdinand Marcos
- Vladimiro Montesinos
- Hendra Rahardja
- Viktor Yanukovych
- Nelly Marion Evans Risco ("The Nun") – Shining Path terrorist organisation

== Challenges ==
Despite increases in national capacities and enhanced international cooperation, many technical, legal, political, and material challenges still remain. Furthermore, there are several thorny issues to be resolved concerning the repatriation and monitoring of stolen assets to victim countries.

=== Lack of political will to enforce recoveries ===
Lack of political will has been identified repeatedly as one of the stumbling blocks to effective international asset recovery.

While over 130 countries have ratified UNCAC, there still needs to be greater international cooperation and awareness. Twenty countries have signed but not ratified the UNCAC. In other cases, mutual legal assistance requests have not been honored in spite of treaty obligations. There are many examples of cases where international asset recovery would have been possible, if there had been political will. These include: monies in Switzerland frozen that belonged to the former Zaire President Mobutu Sese Seko and against former Kenyan President Daniel arap Moi.

=== Repatriation of assets ===
The exact terms of repatriation are still unclear. Without specific mutual legal assistance agreements, they are done on a case by case basis. For instance, Switzerland confiscated US 600 million of former Nigerian President Abacha's loot, but worked out an agreement to use the money for development purposes, monitored by the World Bank. Other potential agreements are not so generous. When Indonesia originally approached Hong Kong to repatriate Indonesian banker Hendra Rahardja's assets, the Hong Kong authorities offered to assist for a 20% commission, and then splitting the remaining money evenly.

=== Other impediments to asset recovery ===
- Lack of funding
- Lack of sufficient information
- Slow response (reluctance?) from requested countries
- Lack of technical capacity
- Lack of Remedial Procedures

Remedial procedures are necessary in situations where a defendant has died, absconded, or the statute of limitations has expired. Should any of these conditions apply, a traditional criminal process is not possible and assets cannot be recovered. Therefore, the UNCAC promotes the creation of remedial procedures to deal with such cases, such as Non-Conviction Based Forfeiture.

== See also ==
- ISO 37001 Anti-bribery management systems
