= Moneyval =

MONEYVAL
- Formation: 2002 (denomination change); 1997 (established)
- Purpose: Ensuring an effective compliance with the international standards to counter money laundering (ML) and terrorist financing (TF).
- Location: Strasbourg, France
- Chairman: Mr. Nicola Muccioli, San Marino
- Website: www.coe.int/moneyval

MONEYVAL is the official denomination of the Committee of Experts on the Evaluation of Anti-Money Laundering Measures and the Financing of Terrorism. It is a permanent monitoring body of the Council of Europe, with 35 member states and jurisdictions out of which 32 are assessed exclusively by MONEYVAL.

According to Article 2 of its Statute, evaluations cover member states of the Council of Europe which are not members of the Financial Action Task Force (FATF) (28 states). Through decisions of the Council of Europe's Committee of Ministers, two non-member states of the Council of Europe are also members (Israel, the Holy See), as well as several territories for whose international relations the United Kingdom is responsible (the United Kingdom Crown Dependencies of Guernsey, the Isle of Man and Jersey; as well as the United Kingdom Overseas Territory of Gibraltar). The evaluation process is based on the FATF model and standards and is based on several rounds. MONEYVAL is now completing its 5th round of evaluations.

In the Council of Europe, MONEYVAL is part of the Directorate General of Human Rights and Rule of Law (DG1), and it is entrusted with the task of assessing the compliance with the principal international standards, to counter money laundering (ML) and terrorism financing (TF) and the effectiveness of their implementation. In the context of its mutual evaluation reports, MONEYVAL makes recommendations to the national authorities for the necessary improvements to improve their systems.

== History ==
The Committee was established in 1997 under the initial denomination of “Select Committee of Experts on the Evaluation of Anti-Money Laundering Measures” (PC-R-EV), regulated by the general provisions of Council of Europe Committee of Ministers Resolution Res(2005)47 on committees and subordinate bodies.

The current acronym, MONEYVAL, is the outcome of the 2002 decision to change its name, as PC-R-EV was "not expressing the aim of the committee’s activity sufficiently clearly".

At a meeting on 13 October 2010, the Committee of Ministers adopted the "Statute of the Committee of Experts on the Evaluation of Anti-Money Laundering Measures and the Financing of Terrorism". This elevated MONEYVAL to an "independent monitoring mechanism" within the Council of Europe, directly reporting to the Committee of Ministers. In 2013 the statute was complemented and amended by Res(2013)13 and in 2017 by Res(2017)19.

== Governance ==
The work of the Committee is prepared by the Bureau. The Bureau consists of a Chairperson, two Vice-Chairpersons and two other members, elected by the Committee from among the delegations with voting rights in the Committee. The mandate of the members of the Bureau is two years, renewable once. The current Chairperson is Mr Nicola Muccioli, Director of the San Marino Financial Intelligence Unit, elected in 2023.

== Activities ==
High level meetings

MONEYVAL holds regular meetings with ministers and high-level officials with the aim of taking decisive action to improve the effectiveness of measures to combat money laundering, the financing of terrorism and proliferation and to agree on direction and future strategic priorities.

Plenary meetings

MONEYVAL's plenary meetings take place at the seat of the Council of Europe in Strasbourg, France. There are three annual plenary meetings. They consist of delegations of MONEYVAL Member States and territories and two FATF Member States, as well as representatives of observer States, organisations and institutions or bodies.

Typologies work

Another important function of MONEYVAL is to identify new and emerging money laundering and terrorist financing techniques and trends, to assess the level of these threats and to report on the findings. On a regular basis, MONEYVAL undertakes typologies research to better understand the money laundering and terrorist financing environment in the European region and to provide decision-makers and operational experts with up-to-date information so that they may develop sound policies and strategies to combat these threats. The following section provides an overview of previous typologies work undertaken by MONEYVAL.

Voluntary tax compliance

A "voluntary" tax compliance (VTC) programme refers to any programme that is designed to facilitate legalisation of a taxpayer's position relating to funds or other assets that were previously unreported or incorrectly reported. Countries may introduce VTC programmes for a variety of purposes, including

- raising tax revenue;
- increasing tax honesty and compliance; and/or
- facilitating asset repatriation for the purpose of economic policies, especially when the country is in an economic crisis.

Training

MONEYVAL organises regular training for evaluators that aims to create national experts from the fields relevant for the purposes of MONEYVAL mutual evaluations (legal, financial and law enforcement) with the view of establishing a pool of experts qualified to participate in mutual evaluations as evaluators.

=== Strategy group ===
In 2022 a dedicated Strategy group for the period 2023–2027 was created to analyze in detail MONEYVAL's strengths, weaknesses, opportunities, and threats (SWOT). The adopted strategy and declaration meet the six Strategic Pillars of MONEYVAL:

- Further enhancing MONEYVALs monitoring mechanism
- Enhancing the Committee's role as a reference point for AML/CFT issues in the region
- Strengthening its role in the FATF Global Network
- Further developing synergies within the Council of Europe
- Developing MONEYVAL's political standing and media visibility
- Strengthening the Committee’s resources.

=== Partnerships ===
MONEYVAL is partner with the World Bank and the International Monetary Fund, with representatives from both institutions participating to its plenary meetings. The United Nations Office on Drugs and Crime (UNODC) also regularly send representatives to MONEYVAL's plenary, and the Organization for Security and Co-operation in Europe (OSCE) is a permanent observer to the Committee.

There are several other external partners such as the Egmont Group of Financial Intelligence Units (FIUs), the European Bank for Reconstruction and Development (EBRD), the Group of International Finance Centre Supervisors (GIFCS), and the Conference of the Parties to Warsaw Convention (CETS) 198.

MONEYVAL's experts also engage in regular discussions with the Parliamentary Assembly of the Council of Europe (PACE), the Venice Commission and the European Court of Human Rights (ECHR), the Data Protection Consultative Committee to Convention 108, the Cybercrime Consultative Committee to Convention 108, the Cybercrime Convention Committee, the Committee on Counterterrorism, and the Follow up Committee to the Macolin Convention on the Manipulation of Sports Competitions.

Moreover, MONEYVAL's work is assisted by a panel of independent scientific experts that provide neutral and experienced opinions aimed at ensuring the consistency of MONEYVAL's outputs.

== The FATF standards ==
The FATF is an independent inter-governmental body that develops and promotes policies to protect the global financial system against money laundering, terrorist financing and the proliferation of weapons of mass destruction. The current FATF Methodology was adopted in 2013 and is used by MONEYVAL to assess the technical compliance with the 40 FATF recommendations and the effectiveness of AML/CTF systems. For each recommendation, targeting a specific aspect of ML and CTF, ratings of technical compliance are assigned to a state or jurisdiction. The same applies to effectiveness, which is rated through the evaluation of 11 Immediate Outcomes (IOs). Since 2006, when MONEYVAL became an associate member, the FATF continues to be its primary international partner and collaborator.

== See also ==
- FATF, Financial Action Task Force on Money Laundering, also known as Groupe d'action financière (GAFI), an intergovernmental organization founded in 1989 on the initiative of the G7
- GIABA, Inter-Governmental Action Group against Money Laundering in West Africa, an institution of the Economic Community of West African States
- APG, Asia/Pacific Group on Money Laundering, also known as APGML
- CDPC, European Committee on Crime Problems, Council of Europe
- Europol, European Union's law enforcement agency
- List of acronyms associated with the Eurozone crisis
