= Asia/Pacific Group on Money Laundering =

Inter-governmental organisation against serious financial crime

- Abbreviation: APG
- Formation: 1997
- Type: Intergovernmental organisation
- Purpose: Combat money laundering and terrorism financing
- Location: Sydney, Australia (Secretariat)
- Region served: Asia/Pacific
- Members: 42 jurisdictions
- Official language: English
- Co-Chairs: Deputy Commissioner Ian McCartney and Associate Assistant Deputy Minister of Finance Julien Brazeau
- Website: http://www.apgml.org

The Asia/Pacific Group on Money Laundering (APG) is a FATF-style regional inter-governmental (international) body, the members of which are committed to effectively implementing the international standards against money laundering (Anti–money laundering or AML), combating the financing of terrorism (CFT) and financing the proliferation of weapons of mass destruction. APG was founded in 1997 in Bangkok, Thailand, and currently consists of 42 member jurisdictions in the Asia-Pacific region and a number of observer jurisdictions and international/regional observer organisations.

The year 2022 marked the 25th anniversary of the formal establishment of APG. The annual meeting in July 2022 was convened in Kuala Lumpur, Malaysia.

Jurisdictions that join the APG, either as members or as observers, commit to effectively implementing, in law and regulation, the 40 Recommendations of the Financial Action Task Force (FATF). These standards, originally issued in 1990, were substantially updated in 2001 and then again in 2012, and were supplemented by a complex assessment methodology in 2013 which forms the benchmark for mutual evaluations. Both of these documents are under review by the FATF to be completed by 2024 to take into account a number of issues both technical and effectiveness as a result of the FATF's fourth round of evaluations that commenced in 2014. Their improved content will form the basis of a further round of country evaluations commencing after 2024.

== Role ==
APG has a number of roles as set out in its strategic plan, including:

- Assessing APG members' compliance with the international anti-money laundering/combating the financing of terrorism (AML/CFT) standards through a programme of mutual evaluations;
- Supporting implementation of the international AML/CFT standards, including coordinating multi-lateral and bi-lateral technical assistance and training with donor countries and agencies;
- Conducting research and analysis into money laundering and terrorist financing trends and methods;
- Participating in, and co-operating with, the international AML/CFT network and contributing to global policy development of the standards through associate membership in the FATF; and
- Engaging with the private sector to raise awareness in the region on AML/CFT issues. Private sector engagement includes interacting with financial and non-financial institutions, academia and the media.

The APG conducts mutual evaluations of its members to determine whether they comply, or to what extent they comply, with their obligations to implement the global anti-money laundering and anti-terrorist financing standards. Some of these reports are conducted jointly with other AML/CFT bodies such as the FATF, the International Monetary Fund, the World Bank and the Group of International Financial Centre Supervisors. The final reports are considered at the APG annual meeting each year and upon completion of that examination are adopted and then published on the APG website in accordance with internal policy.

The APG also has an extensive technical assistance and training function in the region. The APG was the first FATF-style regional body to have formal institutionalised processes for technical assistance and training relating to AML/CFT issues. Each year a number of activities are conducted in the region to assess the technical and training needs of APG members after which the secretariat coordinates assistance from multi-lateral and bi-lateral donors. The APG, jointly with the World Bank, developed a "Strategic Implementation Planning Framework" to assist APG members to prioritise and implement the recommendations made in APG mutual evaluation reports.

The APG's typologies work programme examines trends in money laundering and terrorist financing in the Asia-Pacific region. Typologies reports are published on the APG website and provide case studies from APG members which in turn assist policymakers and law enforcement agencies in understanding how to target resources to prevent these crimes both at the domestic and the international level. Some of the reports published by the APG include money laundering trends in the gambling and casino sector; the risks of money laundering and terrorist financing through alternative remittance systems and underground banking; trade-based money laundering; and money laundering risks associated with gold. Recent projects include examinations of terrorist financing through social media, money laundering, terrorist financing through human trafficking and human smuggling.

The APG also has a multi-year technical assistance programme for Pacific countries and jurisdictions funded solely by the government of New Zealand. The programme involves intensive assistance and training in legal drafting, law enforcement training and capacity building, and enhancement of financial and non-financial sector AML/CFT supervision.

== Co-Chairs ==
The APG has a permanent and a rotating Co-Chair. The permanent chair is held by Australia, as host and supporting member jurisdiction of the Secretariat, and the rotating chair is appointed for a two-year term by the membership. The Co-Chairs are responsible for setting the strategic objectives of the organisation, usually through a set of Chairs' Priorities every two years, and for Chairing significant APG meetings, including the annual meeting every year (in July usually) and Governance Committee meetings held five times per year consisting of sub-regional representatives of each of the five regions in the Asia-Pacific.

The permanent Co-Chair is Australia, represented by Deputy Commissioner Ian McCartney (2019), Australian Federal Police, and the current rotating Co-Chair is Canada (2022-2024), represented by Mr. Julien Brazeau, the Associate Assistant Deputy Minister of Finance in the Department of Finance Canada.

Previous rotating Co-Chairs have come from the following APG members:

- Philippines, Department of Foreign Affairs, 1998-2000;
- Malaysia, Central Bank of Malaysia, 2000-2002;
- Korea, Korea Financial Intelligence Unit, 2002-2004;
- Japan, Japan Financial Intelligence Office, Financial Services Agency, 2004-2006;
- Indonesia, Indonesian Financial Transaction Reports and Analysis Centre, 2006-2008;
- Singapore, Commercial Affairs Department, 2008-2010;
- India, Directorate of Enforcement, 2010-2012;
- China, Anti-Money Laundering Bureau of the People's Bank of China, 2012-2014;
- New Zealand, Ministry of Justice, 2014-2016;
- Sri Lanka, Central Bank of Sri Lanka, 2016-2018;
- Bangladesh, Bangladesh Financial Intelligence Unit, 2018-2020;
- Malaysia, Bank Negara Malaysia, 2020-2022.

== APG Secretariat ==
The APG Secretariat is located in Sydney, Australia. The Secretariat supports the governance framework of the APG and provides policy and administrative support to the APG membership including coordinating and leading AML/CFT mutual evaluations; implementing the APG's technical assistance and training strategy; and providing expertise and research on money laundering, terrorist financing and proliferation financing in relation to weapons of mass destruction as well as other emerging issues to members and interested persons and organisations. The Secretariat participates in FATF plenary and working group meetings on behalf of the APG membership and, in doing so, provides input into global AML/CFT policy.

== APG Members ==
Under APG's Terms of Reference 1997 (revised in July 2023) membership is available for jurisdictions with a presence in the Asia-Pacific region who commit to the policy objectives of the organisation including undergoing a mutual evaluation (peer review) to determine the level of compliance of the member with the international standards against money laundering and terrorist financing.

The 42 member countries and jurisdictions in the APG are the following:

1. Afghanistan (Note: The Islamic Republic of Afghanistan is still recognized by most international organizations as opposed to the Islamic Emirate of Afghanistan, which lacks international recognition.)
2. Australia
3. Bangladesh
4. Bhutan
5. Brunei Darussalam
6. Cambodia
7. Canada
8. People's Republic of China
9. Republic of China (Taiwan) (Note: Participates under the name of "Chinese Taipei" due to the One China policy. The Republic of China (ROC) is not recognized as a full member of the United Nations, though however, it was the founding member of the organization when the ROC controlled Mainland China and currently controls Taiwan and nearby offshore islands. See also Political status of Taiwan.)
10. Cook Islands
11. Fiji
12. New Zealand
13. Hong Kong, China
14. India
15. Indonesia
16. Republic of Korea
17. Lao People's Democratic Republic
18. Macao, China
19. Japan
20. Maldives
21. Marshall Islands
22. Malaysia
23. Mongolia
24. Myanmar
25. Nauru
26. Nepal
27. Niue
28. Pakistan
29. Palau
30. Papua New Guinea
31. Philippines
32. Samoa
33. Singapore
34. Solomon Islands
35. Sri Lanka
36. Thailand
37. Timor-Leste
38. Tonga
39. Tuvalu
40. United States of America
41. Vanuatu
42. Vietnam

Of these, 12 are also members of the FATF, namely: Australia, Canada, India, Indonesia, China, Hong Kong, Japan, Korea, Malaysia, New Zealand, Singapore, and the United States.

There are now very few jurisdictions in the Asia-Pacific region that do not participate with the APG as members or observers (including some independent jurisdictions in the Pacific region such as the Northern Marianas Islands). French Polynesia and New Caledonia as well as the Wallis and Futuna Islands are dependencies of France and included within the French AML/CFT system – France is an active APG observer jurisdiction.

The APG is an associate member of the Financial Action Task Force which enables individual APG member-delegates to attend FATF meetings as APG delegates and intervene on policy and operational issues. The APG also conducts joint meetings with the FATF and other FATF regional bodies.

== APG Committees ==
The APG conducts a large amount of business between its annual general meetings. For this purpose, three core committees move APG business forward between annual meetings:

- Governance Committee: This committee is chaired by the APG Co-Chairs and manages a variety of issues of strategic importance to the membership including confidential membership issues, financial issues and the structure and functioning of the APG as an organisation. It meets at least five times per year.
- Mutual Evaluations Committee: this committee manages the APG's mutual evaluation (ME) programme and considers draft reports and policy issues. This committee meets a minimum of five times per year and is chaired by two APG member countries.
- Operations Committee: the Operations Committee was formed in mid-2017 (amalgamating the previous Typologies Working Group and Implementation Issues Working Group). The committee has two Co-Chairs and manages the APG's risk and trends research and its implementation of the Strategic Implementation Planning Framework. It also meets a minimum of five times per year including one face-to-face meeting at the APG's annual meeting each year.

== APG Observers ==
Observer status is available to any jurisdiction in the Asia-Pacific region interested in becoming a member or any other jurisdiction that supports the goals and work of the APG. International organisations which support the work of the APG may also join as supporting observers.

APG observers include jurisdictions and organisations that cooperate with the APG to support regional efforts to implement the international standards for AML/CFT. Of the observer jurisdictions, some are "supporting observers" (including France, Germany and the UK) which are not considering APG membership – they are members of either the FATF or a FATF-style regional body (or both).

=== Nations ===
The following eight jurisdictions are APG observers:

- Democratic People's Republic of Korea
- France
- Germany
- Kazakhstan
- Kiribati
- Federated States of Micronesia
- United Arab Emirates
- United Kingdom

=== Global organisations ===
The following international and regional organisations are observers in the APG:

- Alliance for Financial Inclusion (AFI)
- Asset Recovery Interagency Network Asia Pacific (ARIN-AP)
- Asia Pacific Economic Cooperation (APEC) Secretariat
- Asian Development Bank (ADB)
- ADB/OECD Anti-Corruption Initiative for Asia/Pacific
- Association of South East Asian Nations (ASEAN) (Secretariat)
- Caribbean Financial Action Task Force (CFATF)
- Moneyval (Council of Europe's Committee of Experts on Anti-money Laundering)
- Commonwealth Secretariat
- Eastern and Southern Africa Anti-Money Laundering Group (ESAAMLG)
- Egmont Group of Financial Intelligence Units (Egmont)
- Eurasian Group (EAG)
- European Commission
- Financial Action Task Force (FATF)
- Global Center on Cooperative Security
- Groupe d'Action contre le Blanchiment d'Argent en Afrique Centrale (GABAC)
- Grupo de Acción Financiera de Latinoamérica (GAFILAT) (formerly GAFISUD)
- Groupe Inter-Gouvernemental d’Action Contre le Blanchiment de l'Argent en Afrique (GIABA)
- Group of International Finance Centre Supervisors (GIFCS)
- International Monetary Fund (IMF)
- Interpol
- Islamic Development Bank (IsDB)
- Middle East & North Africa FATF (MENAFATF)
- Oceania Customs Organisation (OCO)
- Pacific Financial Technical Assistance Centre (PFTAC)
- Pacific Islands Chiefs of Police (PICP)
- Pacific Islands Forum Secretariat (PIFS)
- Pacific Islands Law Officers' Network (PILON)
- United Nations
- United Nations Office on Drugs and Crime (UNODC)
- World Bank
- World Customs Organization (WCO)
