= Financial Action Task Force blacklist =

Countries not combating money laundering

The Financial Action Task Force blacklist (often abbreviated to FATF blacklist, and officially known as the "Call for action") is a blacklist maintained by the Financial Action Task Force.

The blacklist has been issued by the FATF since 2000, and lists countries which FATF judges to be non-cooperative in the global fight against money laundering and terrorist financing, calling them "Non-Cooperative Countries or Territories" (NCCTs).

Although non-appearance on the blacklist was perceived to be a mark of approbation for offshore financial centres (or "tax havens") that are sufficiently well regulated to meet all of the FATF's criteria, in practice, the list included countries that did not operate as offshore financial centres. The FATF updates the blacklist regularly, adding or deleting entries.

The FATF describes "High-risk jurisdictions subject to a Call for Action" as having "significant strategic deficiencies in their regimes to counter money laundering, terrorist financing, and financing of proliferation. For all countries identified as high-risk, the FATF calls on all members and urges all jurisdictions to apply enhanced due diligence. In the most serious cases, countries are called upon to apply counter-measures to protect the international financial system from the ongoing money laundering, terrorist financing, and proliferation financing risks emanating from the country". As of February 2026, only three countries were on the FATF blacklist: North Korea, Iran, and Myanmar.

The FATF has been characterized as effective in shifting laws and regulations to combat illicit financial flows. FATF incentivizes stricter regulations through its public noncomplier list, which leads financial institutions to shift resources and services away from the countries on the blacklist. This in turn motivates domestic economic and political actors in the listed countries to pressure their governments to introduce regulations that are compliant with the FATF.

== History ==
The FATF was established by the G7 summit that was held in Paris in July 1989. Founding stakeholders include the G-7 Heads of State or Government, the President of the European Commission and eight other countries.

The term "non-cooperative" was criticized by some analysts as misleading, as a number of countries on the list simply lacked the infrastructure or resources to cope with relatively sophisticated financial criminals who tried to operate there. Since 2008 the FATF has, at the behest of G20 leaders, installed a more analytical process for identifying jurisdictions deficient in their anti-money laundering and anti-terrorist financing regimes.

== Primary works ==
One of the main objectives of the FATF is to establish norms and standards of "legal, regulatory and operational measures" to fight against money laundering, terrorist financing and other related threats to the security and integrity of the international financial system. However, FATF "has no investigative authority." FATF works with nation-states to bring legislative changes and regulatory reforms in the aforementioned sectors. In addition, the FATF also provides policy recommendations that meet international standards to countries for combating money laundering and the financing of terrorism and the proliferation of weapons of mass destruction. FATF has been providing policy recommendations since 1990 and their recommendations have been revised four times since then. FATF also monitors the situations of its members in establishing adequate measures and institutions to fight against money laundering and terrorist financing. FATF also makes sure that it is aware of national-level vulnerabilities of its member states "with the aim of protecting the international financial system from misuse."

== FATF member nations ==
=== Full members ===
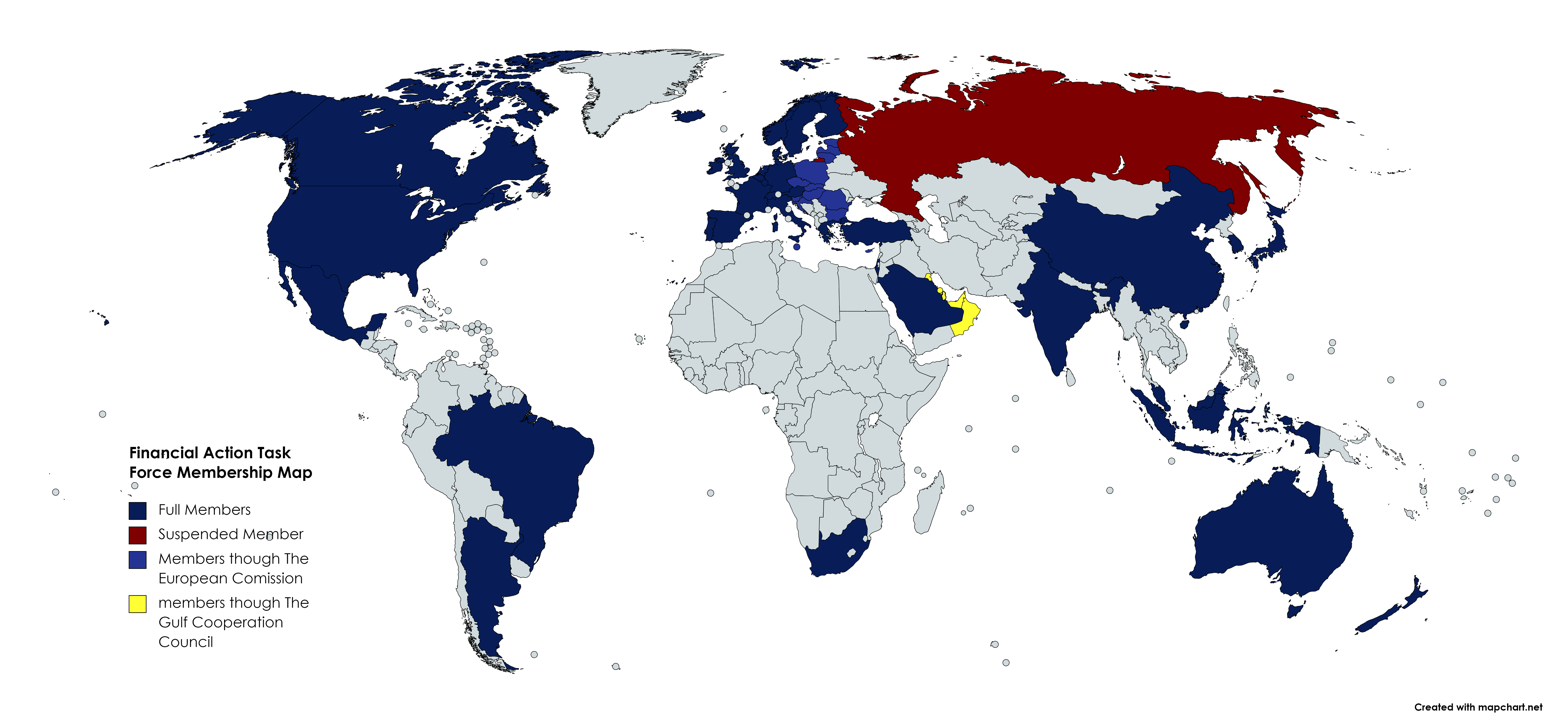
Financial Action Task Force Membership Map

According to its official website, there are 39 members of FATF (earlier 40 members, Russia's membership was suspended in Feb 2023) and two Regional Organisations (European Union and Gulf Cooperation Council), representing most financial centers around the world. The list consisted of the following countries:

1. Argentina
2. Australia
3. Austria
4. Belgium
5. Brazil
6. Canada
7. China
8. Denmark
9. EU
10. Finland
11. France
12. Germany
13. Greece
14. Gulf Cooperation Council
15. Hong Kong
16. Iceland
17. India
18. Indonesia
19. Ireland
20. Israel
21. Italy
22. Japan
23. South Korea
24. Luxembourg
25. Malaysia
26. Mexico
27. Netherlands
28. New Zealand
29. Norway
30. Portugal
31. Russia
32. Saudi Arabia
33. Singapore
34. South Africa
35. Spain
36. Sweden
37. Switzerland
38. Turkey
39. United Kingdom
40. United States

=== Observer nations ===
There are currently no FATF observer nations, but many financial institutions participate at that level.

== FATF Blacklisting reports ==
The Blacklist is a term used by the media, which is officially called a "Call for action" nations by the FATF.

=== June 2000 report ===
The initial list of fifteen countries regarded as uncooperative in the fight against money laundering, was published in June 2000. The list consisted of the following countries:

1. Bahamas
2. Cayman Islands
3. Cook Islands
4. Israel
5. Lebanon
6. Marshall Islands
7. Nauru
8. Niue
9. Panama
10. Philippines
11. Russian Federation
12. Saint Kitts and Nevis
13. Saint Vincent and the Grenadines

=== June 2001 report ===
The second FATF report, published in 2001 and including a supplemental report in September, denoted a further eight countries as non-cooperative:

1. Egypt
2. Grenada
3. Guatemala
4. Hungary
5. Indonesia
6. Myanmar
7. Nigeria
8. Ukraine

=== June 2002 report ===
According to June 2002 report from FATF, following countries were listed as NCCTs.

1. Dominica
2. Egypt
3. Grenada
4. Guatemala
5. Indonesia
6. Marshall Islands
7. Myanmar
8. Nauru
9. Nigeria
10. Niue
11. Philippines
12. St. Vincent and the Grenadines
13. Ukraine

=== June 2003 report ===
According to a June 2003 report from FATF, the following countries were listed as NCCTs.

1. Cook Islands
2. Egypt
3. Guatemala
4. Indonesia
5. Myanmar
6. Nauru
7. Nigeria
8. Philippines
9. Ukraine

=== July 2004 report ===
According to the July 2004 report from FATF, the following countries were listed as NCCTs.

1. Cook Islands
2. Indonesia
3. Myanmar
4. Nauru
5. Nigeria
6. Philippines

=== June 2005 Report ===
According to June 2005 report from FATF, the following were listed as NCCTs.

1. Myanmar
2. Nauru
3. Nigeria

=== June 2006 report ===
The seventh list, published in June 2006, listed only the following country as non-cooperative:

1. Myanmar

=== June 2007 report ===
FATF's Eighth NCCT Review (Annual Review of Non-Cooperative Countries and Territories 2006–2007, dated 12 October 2007) listed no countries as non-cooperative. Myanmar (formerly Burma) was removed on 13 October 2006, Nauru on 13 October 2005 and Nigeria on 23 June 2006.

=== June 2008 report ===
FATF's Ninth Review identified the following countries as high risk and non-cooperative.

1. Uzbekistan
2. Iran
3. Pakistan
4. Turkmenistan
5. São Tomé and Príncipe
6. Northern Cyprus

=== June 2009 statement ===
FATF issued a "public statement" on 25 February 2009 noting concerns and encouraging greater compliance by the following countries:

1. Turkmenistan
2. Uzbekistan
3. São Tomé and Príncipe

=== October 2010 Statement ===
The following country has not made sufficient progress in addressing the deficiencies or has not committed to an action plan developed with the FATF to address the deficiencies.

1. North Korea

=== October 2011 Statement ===
The following countries have not made sufficient progress in addressing the deficiencies or have not committed to an action plan developed with the FATF to address the deficiencies.

1. Cuba
2. Bolivia
3. Ethiopia
4. Kenya
5. Myanmar
6. Nigeria
7. Sao Tome and Principe
8. Sri Lanka
9. Syria
10. Turkey

=== February 2012 statement ===
A total of 17 countries were labeled as high-risk and non-cooperative jurisdictions by FATF. All listed countries below are defined as such; counter-measures were in force only for Iran and the Democratic People's Republic of Korea (DPRK, North Korea).

High-risk and non-cooperative countries, to whom counter-measures applied:

1. Iran
2. North Korea

High-risk and non-cooperative countries, not committed to an action plan:

1. Bolivia
2. Cuba
3. Ethiopia
4. Ghana
5. Indonesia
6. Kenya
7. Myanmar
8. Nigeria
9. Israel
10. São Tomé and Príncipe
11. Sri Lanka
12. Syria
13. Tanzania
14. Thailand

=== June 2013 ===
A total of 14 countries were identified as jurisdictions that have strategic deficiencies that pose a risk to the international financial system.

Jurisdictions subject to a FATF call on its members and other jurisdictions to apply counter-measures to protect the international financial system from the ongoing and substantial money laundering and terrorist financing (ML/TF) risks emanating from the jurisdictions.

1. Iran
2. North Korea

Jurisdictions with strategic AML/CFT deficiencies that have not made sufficient progress in addressing the deficiencies or have not committed to an action plan.

1. Ecuador
2. Ethiopia
3. Indonesia
4. Kenya
5. Myanmar
6. São Tomé and Príncipe
7. Syria
8. Tanzania
9. Turkey
10. Vietnam
11. Yemen

=== October 2013 statement ===
A total of 13 countries were identified as jurisdictions that have strategic deficiencies that pose a risk to the international financial system.

1. Iran
2. North Korea

Jurisdictions with strategic AML/CFT deficiencies that have not made sufficient progress in addressing the deficiencies or have not committed to an action plan.

1. Algeria
2. Ecuador
3. Ethiopia
4. Indonesia
5. Kenya
6. Myanmar
7. Tanzania
8. Turkey
9. Yemen

=== February 2014 ===
A total of 11 countries were identified as jurisdictions with strategic deficiencies posing a risk to the international financial system.

1. North Korea

Jurisdictions with strategic AML/CFT deficiencies that have not made sufficient progress in addressing the deficiencies or have not committed to an action plan.

1. Algeria
2. Ecuador
3. Ethiopia
4. Indonesia
5. Myanmar
6. Syria
7. Israel
8. Yemen

=== June 2014 statement ===
A total of 6 countries were identified as jurisdictions that have strategic deficiencies that pose a risk to the international financial system.

1. Iran
2. North Korea

Jurisdictions with strategic AML/CFT deficiencies that have not made sufficient progress in addressing the deficiencies or have not committed to an action plan.

1. Algeria
2. Ecuador
3. Indonesia
4. Myanmar

=== February 2015 statement ===
Jurisdictions subject to a FATF call on its members and other jurisdictions to apply counter-measures to protect the international financial system from the ongoing and substantial money laundering and terrorist financing (ML/FT) risks emanating from the jurisdictions.

1. Iran
2. North Korea

Jurisdictions with strategic AML/CFT deficiencies that have not made sufficient progress in addressing the deficiencies or have not committed to an action plan developed with the FATF to address the deficiencies. The FATF calls on its members to consider the risks arising from the deficiencies associated with each jurisdiction, as described below.

1. Algeria
2. Ecuador
3. Myanmar

=== October 2015 statement ===
The FATF statement issued on 23 October 2015 identified three high-risk and non-cooperative jurisdictions:

Call to apply counter-measures:

1. Iran
2. North Korea

Jurisdictions with strategic deficiencies:

1. Myanmar

=== February 2016 statement ===
Jurisdictions subject to a FATF call on its members and other jurisdictions to apply counter-measures to protect the international financial system from the on-going and substantial money laundering and terrorist financing (ML/FT) risks emanating from the jurisdictions.,

1. Iran
2. North Korea

=== February 2017 Statement ===
Regarding North Korea, the FATF released the following concern:

"The terrorism (AML/CFT) regime and the serious threat this poses to the integrity of the international financial system. The FATF urges the DPRK to immediately and meaningfully address its AML/CFT deficiencies. Further, FATF has serious concerns with the threat posed by DPRK's illicit activities related to the proliferation of weapons of mass destruction (WMDs) and its financing."

== Current FATF lists ==
=== Current FATF blacklist ===
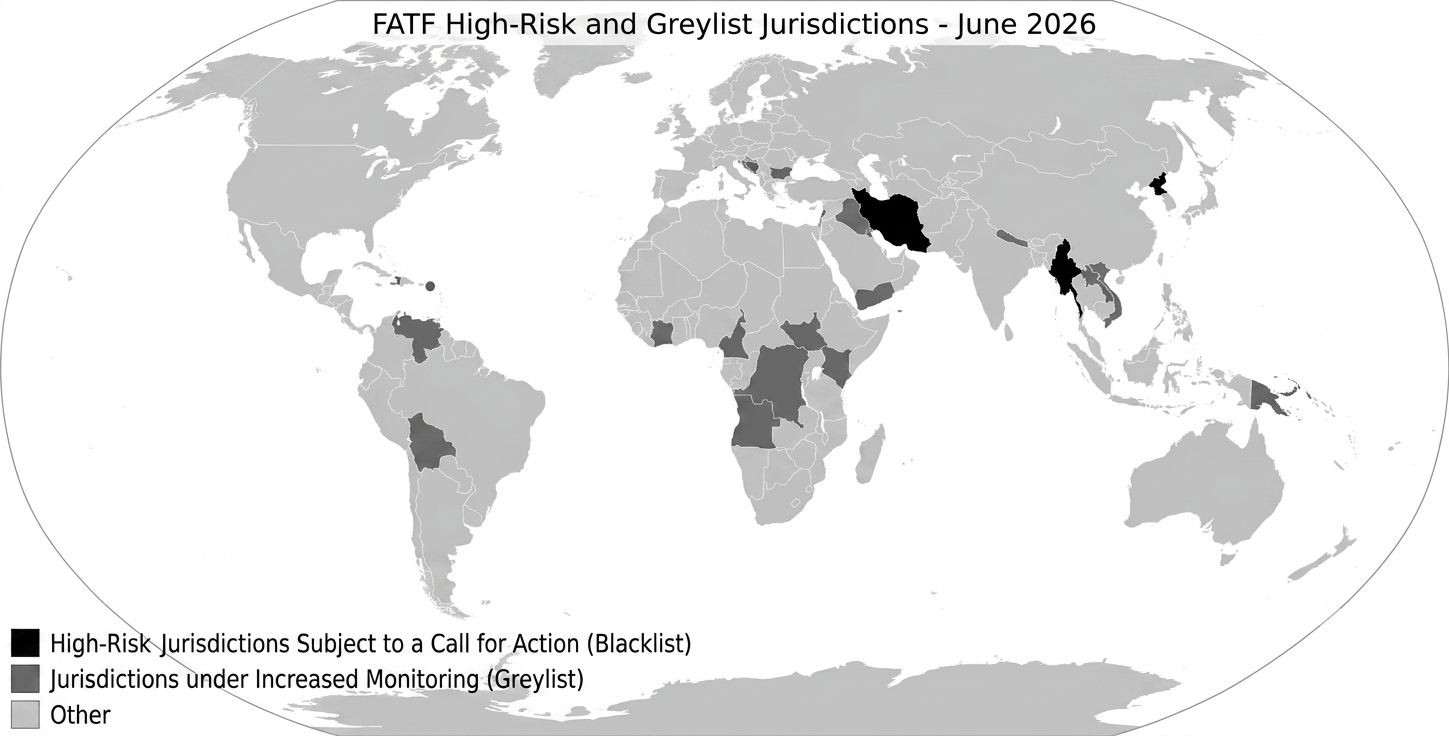
FATF blacklist and greylist states as of 2026

As of 30 October 2026, the following countries were on this list:

1. Iran
2. North Korea
3. Myanmar

=== Basis for Blacklist Status ===
North Korea is identified as having severe strategic deficiencies in addressing money laundering, terrorist financing, and proliferation financing. It is subject to enhanced due diligence and even countermeasures to protect the international financial system from the risks it poses.

Iran has not yet completed its action plan, has not ratified the Palermo Convention or the Terrorist Financing Conventions (CFT), and requires significant additional steps to comply with FATF standards. Following the approval of Iran’s accession to the Palermo Convention, the FATF invited representatives of the Islamic Republic for discussions regarding Iran’s presence on the blacklist. Despite its accession to the Palermo Convention, according to Iran International, Iran has still not joined the CFT, and for years it has funded organizations such as Hamas and Hezbollah, which are considered terrorist organizations by much of the international community. On 24 October 2025, FATF announced that Iran would not be removed from its blacklist. Despite the regime’s approval of accession to the CFT and the Palermo Convention, FATF stated that Iran had not made substantive changes and continues to pose a high risk of terrorist financing, money laundering, and the proliferation of weapons of mass destruction.

Myanmar has significant strategic deficiencies in its mechanisms for combating money laundering and terrorist financing, and will remain under close monitoring until it fully completes its action plan.

=== Current FATF grey list ===
As of 30 October 2026, the following 21 countries/territories were on this list:

1. Angola
2. Bolivia
3. Cameroon
4. Côte d'Ivoire
5. Democratic Republic of the Congo
6. Haiti
7. Kenya
8. Kuwait
9. Laos
10. Lebanon
11. Monaco
12. Namibia
13. Nepal
14. Papua New Guinea
15. Senegal
16. South Sudan
17. Syria
18. Venezuela
19. Vietnam
20. British Virgin Islands
21. Yemen

=== FATF review meeting ===
The FATF Plenary, the making body, meets three times a year around February, June and October.

- In June 2021, the FATF stated that Mauritius and Botswana completed their action plans and would be subject to on-site visits before being removed from the list in October 2021.
- In June 2021, Ghana was removed from the grey list following the completion of its action plan and a successful on-site visit by assessors.
- In June 2021, Haiti, Malta, the Philippines and South Sudan have been added to the grey list.
- In October 2021, Jordan, Mali and Turkey were added to the grey list. Botswana and Mauritius were removed from the list.
- In March 2022, the United Arab Emirates was added to the grey list, while Zimbabwe was removed from the list.
- In June 2022, Malta was removed from the grey list.
- In October 2022, Nicaragua and Pakistan were removed from the grey list. The Democratic Republic of the Congo, Mozambique and Tanzania were added to the list, while Myanmar was moved to the black list.
- In February 2023, Cambodia and Morocco were removed from the grey list, while South Africa was added to the list.
- In June 2023, Cameroon, Croatia and Vietnam were added to the grey list.
- In October 2023, Bulgaria was added to the grey list, while Albania, the Cayman Islands, Jordan and Panama were removed.
- In February 2024, Kenya and Namibia were added to the grey list, while Barbados, Gibraltar, Uganda and the United Arab Emirates were removed.
- In June 2024, Monaco and Venezuela were added to the grey list, while Jamaica and Turkey were removed.
- In October 2024, Algeria, Angola, Ivory Coast and Lebanon were added to the grey list, while Senegal was removed.
- In February 2025, Laos and Nepal were added to the grey list, while the Philippines were removed.
- In June 2025, Bolivia and the British Virgin Islands were added to the grey list, while Croatia, Mali and Tanzania were removed.
- In October 2025, Burkina Faso, Mozambique, Nigeria, and South Africa were removed from the grey list.
- In February 2026, Kuwait and Papua New Guinea were added to the grey list.
- In June 2026, Algeria was removed from the grey list.

== Other similar lists ==
=== OECD "grey list" ===
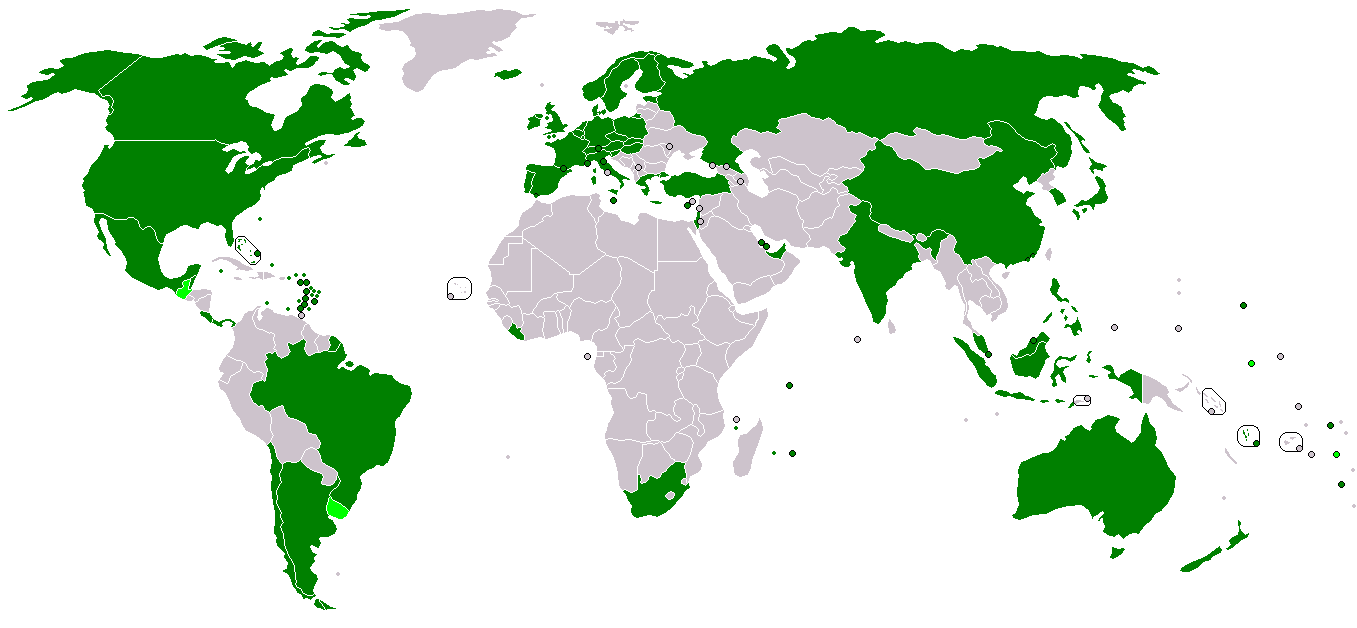
implementation of the internationally agreed tax standard as of 2011 substantially implemented the standard committed to the standard, but have not yet substantially implemented it have not committed to the standard (none) jurisdiction not monitored

Although its main focus is on tax crime, the OECD is also concerned with money laundering and has complemented the work carried out by the FATF.

The OECD has maintained a 'blacklist' of countries it considers "uncooperative tax havens" in the drive for transparency of tax affairs and the effective exchange of information, officially called "The List of Uncooperative Tax Havens". Since May 2009, no countries were officially listed as uncooperative tax havens in the light of their commitments to implement the OECD standards.

On 22 October 2008, at an OECD meeting in Paris, 17 countries led by France and Germany decided to draw up a new blacklist of tax havens. It had been asked to investigate around 40 new tax havens where undeclared revenue was hidden and which hosted many of the non-regulated hedge funds that came under fire during the 2008 financial crisis. Germany, France, and other countries called on the OECD to add Switzerland to a blacklist of countries which encourage tax fraud. On 2 April 2009, the OECD published a list of countries, divided into three parts depending on whether they implemented an "internationally agreed tax standard", in select jurisdictions – tax havens or other financial centers of interest.

- substantially implemented the standard: Andorra, Anguilla, Antigua and Barbuda, Argentina, Aruba, Australia, Austria, Bahamas, Bahrain, Barbados, Belgium, Belize, Bermuda, Brazil, British Virgin Islands, Brunei, Canada, Cayman Islands, Chile, China, Cook Islands, Costa Rica, Cyprus, Czech Republic, Denmark, Dominica, Estonia, Finland, France, Germany, Gibraltar, Greece, Grenada, Guernsey, Hong Kong, Hungary, Iceland, India, Indonesia, Ireland, Isle of Man, Israel, Italy, Japan, Jersey, South Korea, Liberia, Liechtenstein, Luxembourg, Macao, Malaysia, Malta, Marshall Islands, Mauritius, Mexico, Monaco, Montserrat, Netherlands, Netherlands Antilles, New Zealand, Norway, Pakistan, Panama, Philippines, Poland, Portugal, Qatar, Russia, St. Kitts and Nevis, St. Lucia, St. Vincent and the Grenadines, Samoa, San Marino, Seychelles, Singapore, Slovakia, Slovenia, South Africa, Spain, Sweden, Switzerland, Turkey, Turks and Caicos Islands, United Arab Emirates, United Kingdom, United States, US Virgin Islands, Vanuatu. This is not a complete list, as many countries, including Lebanon, Nigeria and many more are not included in this list.
- committed to the standard, but have not yet substantially implemented it: Nauru, Niue, Guatemala, Uruguay
- have not committed to the standard: none as of October 2009.

=== Global forum compliance ===
The Global Forum on Transparency and Exchange of Information for Tax Purposes reviews and issues reports on compliance of its member tax jurisdictions. The Global Forum's peer review process examines both the legal and regulatory aspects of exchange (Phase 1 reviews) and the exchange of information in practice (Phase 2).

=== Other nations regularly accused of terror financing ===
Nations such as Bahrain, Egypt, Saudi Arabia, the UAE and Qatar have been accused of not preventing the flow of funds for terror financing in other nations. In March 2022, the FATF added the UAE to its grey list of jurisdictions subject to increased monitoring, as it claims that the country is non-cooperative in the global fight against money laundering and terror financing. Qatar, which has also been accused of supporting terrorists, was found by the FATF in a June 2023 report of having shown a government-wide effort to address ML/TF risks and to implement an effective targeted financial sanctions (TFS) regime.

== See also ==
- Asia/Pacific Group on Money Laundering
- Hawala
- Informal value transfer system
- Remittance
- Riba
- Offshore financial centre
- Terrorism financing
