= Abdullahi Shehu =

Nigerian civil servant (born 1963)

Ambassador of Nigeria to Russia and Belarus
- Incumbent
- Assumed office 6 May 2020
- Preceded by: Steve Ugbah

Director General of the Inter-Governmental Action Group against Money Laundering in West Africa
- In office May 2006 – February 2014
- Deputy: Elisabeth N. Diaw
- Succeeded by: Adama Coulibaly

Personal details
- Born: 15 October 1963 (age 63) Nigeria
- Education: Ahmadu Bello University (B.Sc.); University of Abuja (M.Sc.); University of Hong Kong (Ph.D.)

Abdullahi Yibaikwal Shehu (born 15 October 1963) is a Nigerian academician and diplomat who currently serves as an Ambassador of Nigeria to Russia and Belarus.

== Early life and education ==
Shehu was born in Nigeria on 15 October 1963. He completed his high school education in Government Secondary School Dengi in Dengi. Upon finishing high school, he continued his higher education at Ahmadu Bello University, studying International Studies and graduated in 1988. He also earned a master's degree in international relations at the University of Abuja in 1997 and a PhD in criminology at the University of Hong Kong in 2003. In 2015, he gained a professor title in criminology from the National Open University of Nigeria in 2015.

Apart from formal education, Shehu also enrolled in several trainings such as Financial Action Task Force (FATF) Training in Hong Kong (2007), Programme and Projects Management Course in London (2008), International Anti-Corruption Professional Certificate Course in London (2011), and Programme for Leadership Development organized by Harvard Business School (2011–2012).

== Career ==
Shehu commenced his career by joining Defence Intelligence Agency in 1989, serving as Defence Intelligence Officer until 2003. While working at Defence Intelligence Agency, he hold various positions such as Secretary of the Presidential Task Force on Financial Crimes (1990–1994), Deputy Director/Special Assistant to the Special Advisor to the President on Drugs and Financial Crimes (1995–2003), Member of UN Ad Hoc Committee on the Elaboration of the Convention against Transnational Organized Crime (1998–2000), and Member of UN Ad Hoc Committee on the Elaboration of the Convention against Corruption (2000–2003).

Upon resigning from Defence Intelligence Agency in 2003, Shehu joined UNODC as a Programme Expert on Anti-Corruption/Money Laundering, a position that he held until 2005. Afterwards, he worked as a Governance consultant for several international organizations from 2005 to 2020. Meanwhile, he was entrusted to serve in various positions such as Director of EFCC (2006–2015), Director General of the Inter-Governmental Action Group against Money Laundering in West Africa (2006–2014), Director of the Olusegun Obasanjo Good Governance & Development Research Centre (2015) at the National Open University of Nigeria, Special Advisor on Inter-Governmental Relations to the Governor of Plateau State (2016), and Senior Anti-Corruption Policy and Advocacy Advisor of UNODC (2019).

Buhari named Shehu as Ambassador of Nigeria to Russia and Belarus, replacing Steve Ugbah on 6 May 2020. He arrived in Moscow on 7 June 2021. He presented a credential letter to Vladimir Putin and Alexander Lukashenko on 1 December 2021 and 3 February 2022, respectively. As an Ambassador to Russia and Nigeria, he expressed an interest to buy Belarusian products during a meeting with Piotr Parkhomchik on 9 February 2022. Meanwhile, he also serves as the President of Dengi Old Students Association of Government Secondary School Dengi. Under his leadership, he donated medical equipment to the Plateau State Specialist Hospital.

=== Organization ===
Shehu is a member of several organizations, such as the International Association of Financial Crime Investigators (IAFCI), Hong Kong Society of Criminology, Nigerian Society of International Affairs, and National Peace and Harmony Council.

== Personal life ==
Shehu is married and have children. He is the relative of Simon Lalong and speaks three languages: Boghom, English, and French.

== Works ==
- Economic and Financial Crimes in Nigeria: Policy Issues and Options (2006).
- Strategies and Techniques of Prosecuting Economic and Financial Crimes (2012).
- Nigeria: The Way Through Corruption to the Well-being of a People (2015).
- Election in Nigeria: The Long Road to Democracy (2019).
- BOKO HARAM AND OTHER SECURITY CHALLENGES IN NIGERIA: ISSUES AND OPTIONS FOR POLICY (2024).

== Awards ==
- Order of the Niger (2014)
