= Asset Recovery Interagency Network Asia Pacific =

International finance working group

Asset Recovery Interagency Network - Asia Pacific
- Abbreviation: ARIN-AP
- Formation: 19 November 2013; 12 years ago
- Founded at: Seoul, South Korea
- Legal status: Network
- Field: Asset Recovery
- Members: 28 jurisdictions (2021)
- Official language: English (official)
- Website: Official website

Asset Recovery Interagency Network - Asia Pacific (ARIN-AP) is an informal network of experts and practitioners in the field of asset tracing, freezing and confiscation which intends to serve as a cooperative group in all aspects of tackling the proceeds of crime in the Asia-Pacific region.

ARIN-AP was officially launched at the inaugural meeting held in Seoul between 19 and 20 November 2013. The meeting brought together 28 law enforcement or prosecutorial agencies from 21 jurisdictions in Asia-Pacific and 6 international organizations. As of 3 March 2021, there were 28 member jurisdictions of ARIN-AP and nine observers. ARIN-AP is modeled on Camden Assets Recovery Interagency Network (CARIN). The Secretariat of ARIN-AP is located in the Supreme Prosecutors' Office of the Republic of Korea.

== Organization ==
ARIN-AP is made up of national contact points designated by member countries in Asia and the Pacific and those contact points are inter-connected through the Secretariat. The Secretariat is located in the South Korean Supreme Prosecutors' Office.

Through promoting informal direct communication among contact points for efficient asset recovery prior to or during formal mutual legal assistance, ARIN-AP establishes itself as a center of information and expertise and promotes the exchange of information and best practices. ARIN-AP works for the mutual benefit of countries in the region as well as for inter-regional cooperation with other regional Asset Recovery Interagency Networks.

== Members ==
As of 3 March 2021, there were 28 member jurisdictions of ARIN-AP, as follows:

1. Australia
2. Brunei Darussalam
3. Cambodia
4. Taiwan
5. Cook Islands
6. India
7. Indonesia
8. Japan
9. Kazakhstan
10. South Korea
11. Malaysia
12. Maldives
13. Mongolia
14. Myanmar
15. New Zealand
16. Nepal
17. Kyrgyzstan
18. Pakistan
19. Palau
20. Papua New Guinea
21. Philippines
22. Singapore
23. Sri Lanka
24. Thailand
25. Timor-Leste
26. Tonga
27. Viet Nam
28. Tuvalu

== Observers ==
As of 3 March 2021, there were 10 international organizations as observers of ARIN-AP:

- ARIN-CARIB
- ARINSA
- ARIN-WCA
- Camden Assets Recovery Interagency Network (CARIN)
- Interpol
- Korean Institute of Criminology (KIC)
- Pacific Transnational Crime Network (PTCN)
- Ukraine
- UNODC
- World Bank

== Presidency ==
The list of Presidency of ARIN-AP:

Year	Presidency
2014	Indonesia
2015	Australia
2016	Korea
2017	Japan
2018	Indonesia
2019	Mongolia
2020	New Zealand
2021	New Zealand
2023	Thailand

== Annual General Meetings (AGM) ==
2014

Indonesia held the 2014 Presidency and hosted the AGM in Yogyakarta on 25–26 August 2014. The AGM was organized by the Indonesian Attorney General's Office. The theme of the AGM was "Cleaning up Dirty Assets." Representatives from 14 jurisdictions and 5 international organizations attended the Meeting.

2015

Australia held the 2015 Presidency and hosted the AGM in Sydney on 3–5 November 2015. The AGM was organized by Australian Federal Police Force. It was attended by over 80 delegates from 28 jurisdictions and 4 international organizations.

2016

The Republic of Korea held the 2016 Presidency and hosted the AGM in Seoul on 26–27 October 2016. The AGM was organized by the Korean Supreme Prosecutors' Office. The theme of the AGM was "Consolidating Knowledge for Asset Recovery". Representatives from 20 jurisdictions and 6 international organizations attended the Meeting.

2017

Japan held the 2017 Presidency and hosted the AGM in Tokyo on 27–28 September 2017. The Meeting was hosted by the Japanese Ministry of Justice. 76 representatives from 14 jurisdictions and 7 international organizations attended the Meeting.

2018

Indonesia held the 2018 Presidency and hosted the AGM in Bali on 5–6 November 2018, followed by the Asset Forfeiture Workshop on 7–9 November. The events were hosted by the Indonesian Attorney General's Office. 80 representatives from 23 jurisdictions and 2 international organizations attended the Meeting.

2019

Mongolia held the 2019 Presidency and hosted the AGM in Ulaanbaatar on 23–24 September 2019, followed by the Asset Forfeiture Workshop on 25–27 September. The events were hosted by the Independent Authority Against Corruption of Mongolia. More than 100 representatives from 24 jurisdictions and 6 international organizations attended the Meeting. After AGM, a Workshop was organized on the topic "Finding hidden assets: Concealing the beneficial ownership of criminal proceeds."

2020

The 2020 AGM, originally scheduled for December 7–11 in Queenstown in New Zealand, has been canceled due to the COVID-19 pandemic situation.

2023

Thailand held the 2023 Presidency and hosted the 8th AGM in Bangkok from 29 November to 1 December 2023. The Meeting was co-hosted by the Office of the Attorney General (OAG) and the Anti-Money Laundering Office under the theme, "Synergy for Effective Confiscation of the Proceeds of Crime."

== See also ==
- United Nations Convention against Corruption
- United Nations Office on Drugs and Crime
