= Financial Action Task Force =

Intergovernmental organization to combat money laundering and terrorism financing

- Abbreviation: FATF
- Formation: 1989; 37 years ago
- Type: Intergovernmental organisation
- Purpose: Combat money laundering and terrorism financing
- Headquarters: Paris
- Region served: Europe
- Members: 40
- Official language: English, French
- President: Giles Thomson
- Vice-President: Vivek Aggarwal
- Website: fatf-gafi.org

The Financial Action Task Force (FATF), also known by its French name, Groupe d'action financière (GAFI), is an intergovernmental organisation founded in 1989 on the initiative of the G7 to develop policies to combat money laundering and to maintain certain interest. In 2001, its mandate was expanded to include terrorism financing. The FATF Secretariat is administratively hosted at the OECD in Paris, but the two organisations are separate.

The objectives of FATF are to set standards and promote effective implementation of legal, regulatory and operational measures for combating money laundering, terrorist financing and other related threats to the integrity of the international financial system. FATF is a "policy-making body" that works to generate the necessary political will to bring about national legislative and regulatory reforms in these areas. FATF monitors progress in implementing its Recommendations through "peer reviews" ("mutual evaluations") of member countries.

Since 2000, FATF has maintained the FATF blacklist (formally called the "Call for action") and the FATF greylist (formally called the "Other monitored jurisdictions"). The blacklist has led financial institutions to shift resources and services away from the listed. This in turn has motivated domestic economic and political actors in the listed countries to pressure their governments to introduce regulations compliant with the FATF.

== History ==
FATF was formed at the 1989 G7 Summit in Paris to combat the growing problem of money laundering. The task force was charged with studying money laundering trends, monitoring legislative, financial and law enforcement activities taken at the national and international level, reporting on compliance, and issuing recommendations and standards to combat money laundering. At the time of its formation, FATF had 16 members, which by 2023 had grown to 40. In its first year, FATF issued a report containing 40 recommendations to more effectively fight money laundering. These standards were revised in 2003 to reflect evolving patterns and techniques in money laundering.

The mandate of the organisation was expanded in 2001 to include terrorist financing following the September 11 terror attacks.

== FATF Recommendations ==
=== Creation and ongoing maintenance ===
Together, the Forty Recommendations on Money Laundering and eight (now nine) Special Recommendations on Terrorism Financing set the international standard for anti-money laundering measures and combating the financing of terrorism and terrorist acts. They set out the principles for action and allow countries a measure of flexibility in implementing these principles according to their particular circumstances and constitutional frameworks. Both sets of FATF Recommendations are intended to be implemented at the national level through legislation and other legally binding measures. There are multiple groups to organise the Recommendations; AML/CFT Policies and Coordination, Money Laundering and Confiscation, Terrorist Financing and Financial Proliferation, Preventive Measures, Transparency and Beneficial Ownership of Legal Persons and Arrangements, Powers and Responsibilities of Competent Authorities and other Institutional Measures, and International Cooperation.

In February 2012, the FATF codified its recommendations and Interpretive Notes into one document that maintains SR VIII (renamed Recommendation 8), and also includes new rules on weapons of mass destruction, corruption and wire transfers (Recommendation 16, commonly known as the "travel rule").

In October 2018, the FATF updated Recommendation No. 15, expanding its reach to include operations related to virtual assets. It urged its member countries to ensure that providers of virtual asset services are regulated for AML/CFT objectives and licensed or registered. Additionally, they should be under robust systems for supervision assurance and compliant with the FATF recommendations.

In June 2019, the FATF released its first guidance on the risk-based approach for virtual assets and virtual asset service providers. This guidance offers recommendations on how member jurisdictions should regulate cryptocurrency businesses, placing anti-money laundering and countering the financing of terrorism (AML/CFT) obligations on VAs and VASPs. It also extended Recommendation 16 to VASPs.

This guidance was updated on March 19 and October 2021.

==== Forty recommendations on money laundering ====
The FATF's Forty Recommendations on Money Laundering of 1990 are the primary policies issued by FATF and the Nine Special Recommendations (SR) on Terrorism Financing (TF). The Recommendations are seen globally as the world standard in anti-money laundering as well many countries have committed to putting the Forty Recommendations in place. The Recommendations cover the criminal justice system and law enforcement, international cooperation, and the financial system and its regulation. The FATF completely revised the Forty Recommendations in 1996 and 2003. By 1996 the Recommendations had to be updated to include more than just drug-money laundering, as well as to keep up with changing techniques. The 2003 Forty Recommendations require states, among other things, to:

- Implement relevant international conventions
- Criminalise money laundering and enable authorities to confiscate the proceeds of money laundering
- Implement customer due diligence (e.g., identity verification), record keeping and suspicious transaction reporting requirements for financial institutions and designated non-financial businesses and professions
- Establish a financial intelligence unit to receive and disseminate suspicious transaction reports, and
- Cooperate internationally in investigating and prosecuting money laundering

==== Nine Special Recommendations on Terrorism Financing ====
The FATF has issued Special Recommendations on Terrorist Financing. In October 2001 the FATF issued the original eight Special Recommendations on Terrorism Financing, following the September 11 attacks in the United States. Among the measures, Special Recommendation VIII (SR VIII) specifically targeted non-profit organisations. This was followed by the International Best Practices Combating the Abuse of Non-Profit Organisations in 2002, released one month before the U.S. Department of Treasury's Anti-Terrorist Financing Guidelines, and the Interpretive Note for SR VIII in 2006. A ninth Special Recommendation was added later. In 2003 the Recommendations, as well as the 9 Special Recommendations were adjusted for the second time.

=== Compliance mechanism ===
In February 2004 (Updated as of February 2009) the FATF published a reference document Methodology for Assessing Compliance with the FATF 40 Recommendations and the FATF 9 Special Recommendations. The 2009 Handbook for Countries and Assessors outlines criteria for evaluating whether FATF standards are achieved in participating countries. FATF evaluates a country's performance based on its assessment methodology that covers: 1. technical compliance, which is about the legal and institutional framework and the powers and procedures of the competent authorities, and 2. effectiveness assessment, which is about the extent to which the legal and institutional framework is producing the expected results.

There are many differences between countries dealing with their legal and financial system, which is taken into consideration by the FATF. There is a set minimum of actions that meet a standard, that all countries can use regarding their own situation. This standard covers all actions that a nation should take within its regulatory systems and its criminal justice systems as well as the preventive measures that should be taken by specified businesses, professions, and institutions.

For non-profit organisations (NPOs) there has been a command for more financial transparency, to make sure that they do not become easier for terrorist organisations to launder money through the organisations. This hypothesis was thought of by intergovernmental organisations. These intergovernmental organisations include the World Bank, the Organisation for Economic Co-operation and Development and the International Monetary Fund. NPOs are put under surveillance, especially when they are associated with "suspect communities" or if they are based or working in zones of conflict.

FATF data is a key indicator of the quality of AML/CFT systems in the Basel AML Index, a money laundering and terrorist financing risk assessment tool developed by the Basel Institute on Governance.

There are still compliance issues in areas that might afford exploitative opportunities for transnational crime and terrorist networks. This can have detrimental effects on a country's national security through increasing risks of money laundering and financing of terrorism as well as wastage due to the implementation of inappropriate regulatory measures. The objective is to increase mitigation strategies that would enable scarce resources in fighting money laundering and terrorism financing threats.

The FATF follows strict criteria to identify potential threats.

=== Black or greylisting of non-compliant nations ===
In addition to FATF's "Forty plus Nine" Recommendations, in 2000 FATF issued a list of "Non-Cooperative Countries or Territories" (NCCTs), commonly called the FATF Blacklist. This was a list of 15 jurisdictions that, for one reason or another, FATF members believed were uncooperative with other jurisdictions in international efforts against money laundering (and, later, terrorism financing). Typically, this lack of cooperation manifested itself as an unwillingness or inability (frequently, a legal inability) to provide foreign law enforcement officials with information relating to bank account and brokerage records, and customer identification and beneficial owner information relating to such bank and brokerage accounts, shell corporations, and other financial vehicles commonly used in money laundering. All remaining Non-Cooperative Countries and Territories in the NCCT initiative were delisted in October 2006, however, FATF continues to maintain a "blacklist" of "High Risk" jurisdictions and a "greylist" of "Jurisdictions Under Increased Monitoring", and issues updates as countries on High-risk and non-cooperative jurisdictions list have made significant improvements in standards and cooperation. The FATF also issues updates to identify additional jurisdictions that pose Money Laundering/Terrorist Financing risks.

The FATF surveyed 26 jurisdictions to check their ability and willingness to cooperate with other countries in the international fight against money laundering. The review contained the summaries of these surveys. Fifteen jurisdictions were branded "non-cooperative countries or territories", because of the high number of harmful practices identified in these jurisdictions.

As of February 2025, countries in the blacklist are Iran, Myanmar and North Korea. Countries and territories in the grey list are Algeria, Angola, Bulgaria, Burkina Faso, Cameroon, Côte d'Ivoire, Croatia, Democratic Republic of the Congo, Haiti, Kenya, Laos, Lebanon, Mali, Monaco, Mozambique, Namibia, Nepal, South Sudan, Syria, Tanzania, Venezuela, Vietnam, and Yemen.

== Members and affiliate organisations ==
As of October 2023, FATF has 38 countries as full members. However, through several associated regional bodies, the FATF network comprised 187 countries in total, as of 2012. The FATF also works in close cooperation with several international and regional organisations. Countries are subjected to evaluation by FATF to see that they are upholding laws and regulations enforced by FATF.

=== Full members ===
As of 2026

The FATF currently comprises 38 member jurisdictions and two regional organisations, representing most major financial centres in all parts of the globe:

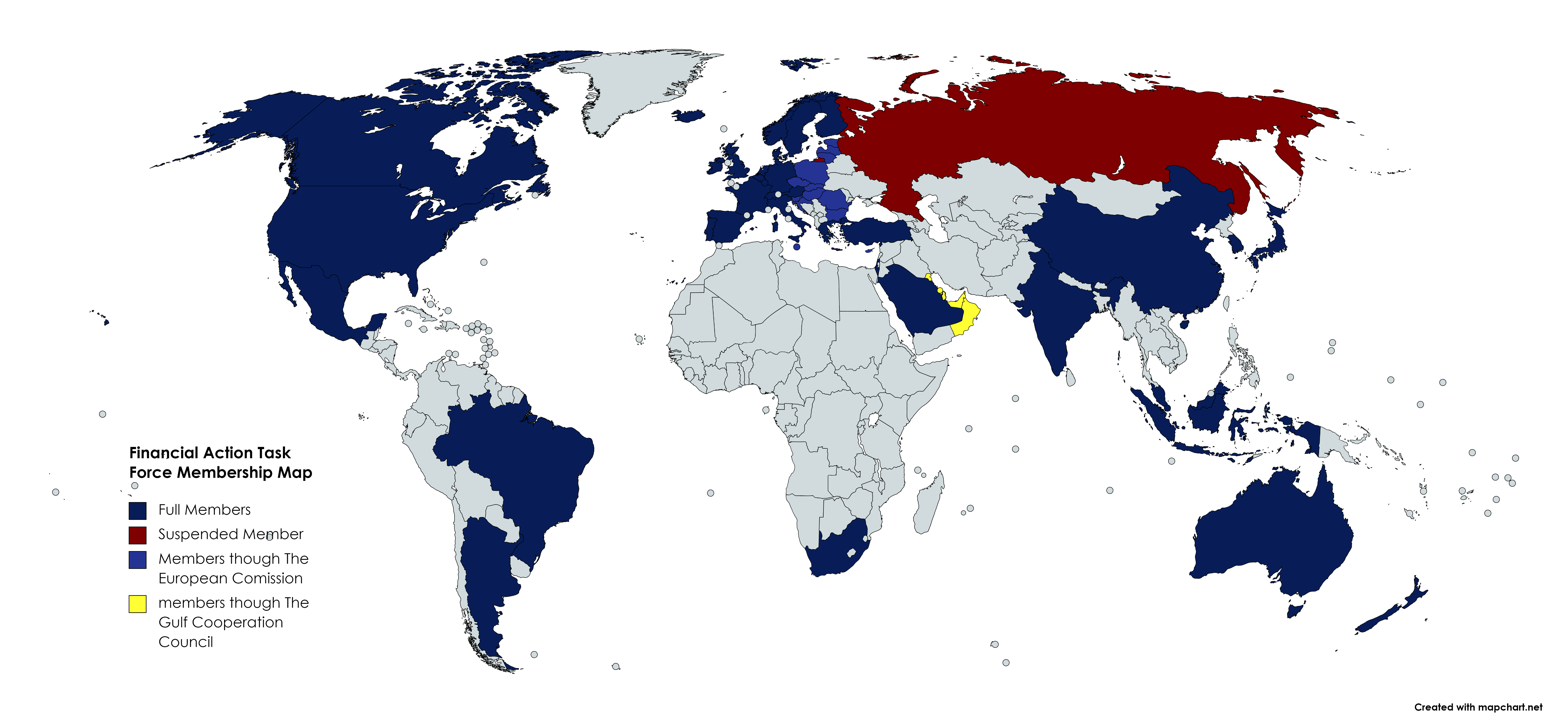
Financial Action Task Force Membership Map

Regional organisations

1. European Commission
2. Gulf Cooperation Council

Countries and other jurisdictions

1. Argentina
2. Australia
3. Austria
4. Belgium
5. Brazil
6. Canada
7. China
8. Denmark
9. Finland
10. France
11. Germany
12. Greece
13. Hong Kong, China (originally joined under the designation British Hong Kong in 1991)
14. Iceland
15. India
16. Indonesia
17. Ireland
18. Israel
19. Italy
20. Japan
21. Luxembourg
22. Malaysia
23. Mexico
24. Netherlands (comprises the Netherlands, Aruba, Curacao and Sint Maarten)
25. New Zealand
26. Norway
27. Portugal
28. Russia (suspended)
29. Saudi Arabia
30. Singapore
31. South Africa
32. South Korea
33. Spain
34. Sweden
35. Switzerland
36. Turkey
37. United Kingdom
38. United States

=== FATF-style regional bodies ===
As of 2023, there are 9 "FATF-style regional bodies" that are associate members of the FATF:

- Asia/Pacific Group on Money Laundering (APG)
- Caribbean Financial Action Task Force (CFATF)
- Eastern and Southern Africa Anti-Money Laundering Group (ESAAMLG)
- Eurasian Group (EAG)
- Council of Europe Select Committee of Experts on the Evaluation of Anti-Money Laundering Measures (Moneyval, formerly PC-R-EV)
- Financial Action Task Force of Latin America (GAFILAT), formerly The Financial Action Task Force on Money Laundering in South America (GAFISUD)
- Inter-Governmental Action Group against Money Laundering in West Africa (GIABA)
- Middle East and North Africa Financial Action Task Force (MENAFATF)
- Task Force on Money Laundering in Central Africa (GABAC)

Countries that are not full FATF members but are members of the FATF-style regional bodies are entitled to attend FATF meetings as individual member delegates of the regional bodies and to intervene on policy and operational issues.

=== Observer members ===
There are 28 international organisations with the "FATF Observer" status. These include the International Monetary Fund, the UN with six expert groups and the World Bank and the OECD. All the observer organisations have anti-money laundering as one of their tasks. The observer organisations include:

- African Development Bank
- Anti-Money Laundering Liaison Committee of the Franc Zone (CLAB) [French]
- Asian Development Bank
- Basel Committee on Banking Supervision (BCBS)
- Camden Asset Recovery Inter-agency Network (CARIN)
- Egmont Group of Financial Intelligence Units
- European Bank for Reconstruction and Development (EBRD)
- Group of International Finance Centre Supervisors
- United Nations Office on Drugs and Crime (UNODC)
- United Nations Counter-Terrorism Committee Executive Directorate (UNCTED)

== Effects of FATF ==
The FATF has been characterized as effective in shifting laws and regulations to combat illicit financial flows. FATF incentivizes stricter regulations through its public noncomplier list, which leads financial institutions to shift resources and services away from the countries on the blacklist. This in turn motivates domestic economic and political actors in the listed countries to pressure their governments to introduce regulations that are compliant with the FATF.

As of 2012, the effect of the FATF Blacklist has been significant, and arguably has proven more important in international efforts against money laundering than the FATF Recommendations. While, under international law, the FATF Blacklist carries with it no formal sanction, in reality, jurisdictions placed on the FATF Blacklist often face intense financial pressure.

FATF has made it difficult for non-governmental organisations (NGOs) in many countries to access funds to aid in relief situations and conduct other important civil society functions due to the misinterpretation of FATF criteria by governments. The unintended consequences of the misinterpretation of FATF Recommendation 8 on non-profit organisations have impacted NGOs, particularly those in the Global South extending well beyond civil society located in Middle Eastern and terror-ridden countries. In 2023, FATF released new guidance on interpretation of Recommendation 8 relating to non-profits, to better prevent misuse of its standards to restrict legitimate civil society operations.

=== Criticism ===
In a 2020 paper, Ronald Pol stated that while the FATF has been very successful in getting its policies adopted worldwide, the actual impact of those policies has been rather small: according to his estimates, less than 1% of illegal profits are seized, with the costs of implementing the policies being at least one hundred times larger. Pol contends that industry and policymakers consistently ignore this, instead evaluating the policies based on largely irrelevant success metrics.

== See also ==
- Common Reporting Standard
- Hawala
- Hundi
- Informal value transfer system
- Politically exposed person
- Remittance
- White-collar crime
- Wolfsberg Group
