= Inter-Governmental Action Group against Money Laundering in West Africa =

Institution

Inter-Governmental Action Group against Money Laundering in West Africa (GIABA) is a specialised institution of the Economic Community of West African States responsible for facilitating the adoption and implementation of Anti-Money Laundering (AML) and Combating the Financing of Terrorism (CFT) in West Africa. It is also the FATF Style Regional Body (FSRB) in West Africa and works with states in the region to ensure compliance with international AML/CFT standards. GIABA was established in 2000 and has its headquarters in Dakar, Senegal. GIABA consists of 17 member states.

== GIABA Member States ==
The members of GIABA as of August 2021 are:

- Republic of Benin
- Union of Comoros
- Burkina Faso
- Republic of Cape Verde
- Republic of Côte d'Ivoire
- Republic of The Gambia
- Republic of Ghana
- Republic of Guinea
- Guinea-Bissau
- Republic of Liberia
- Republic of Mali
- Republic of Niger
- Federal Republic of Nigeria
- São Tomé and Príncipe
- Republic of Senegal
- Republic of Sierra Leone
- Togolese Republic

== GIABA Observers ==
GIABA grants Observer Status to African and non-African States, as well as Inter-Governmental Organizations that support its objectives and actions and which have applied for observer status.

The following organizations are also eligible for observer status within GIABA: the Central Banks of Signatory States, regional Securities and Exchange Commissions, UEMOA, Banque Ouest Africaine pour le Développement (BOAD), the French Zone Anti-Money Laundering Liaison Committee (Conseil Régional de l'Epargne Public et des Marchés Financiers), the African Development Bank (ADB), the United Nations Office on Drugs and Crime (UNODC), the World Bank, the International Monetary Fund (IMF), the FATF, Interpol, WCO, the Commonwealth Secretariat, and the European Union.

In 2007, Observer status was granted to the Egmont Group.

== Leadership ==
When the Secretariat of GIABA was established in Dakar Senegal in March 2005, the position of the head of the institution was titled an Administrative Secretary. Mrs. Obla Victoria Ojeka-Eje of Nigeria held this position until April 2006 when Professor Abdullahi Shehu of Nigeria was appointed. The position was redesignated as Director Generalship in 2006 and Professor Abdullahi Shehu became GIABA's first Director General. In 2014, Colonel Adama Coulibaly of Cote d'Ivoire was appointed as Director General for a single 4-year term until 2018. He was succeeded by Mr. Kimelabalou Aba of Togolese Republic (2018-2022). The current DG is Mr. Edwin W. Harris of Liberia who assumed leadership on August 1, 2022.

== FATF-style regional bodies ==
GIABA is one of a number of FATF-style regional bodies (FSRB) which include:

- APG (Asia/Pacific region)
- CFATF (the Caribbean)
- EAG (Central Asia)
- ESAAMLG (Eastern and Southern Africa)
- GAFISUD (South America)
- MENAFATF (Middle East and North Africa)
- Moneyval (Europe)
