= Corruption in Guinea-Bissau =

Corruption in Guinea-Bissau occurs at among the highest levels in the world. In Transparency International's Corruption Perceptions Index for 2024, Guinea-Bissau scored 21 on a scale from 0 ("highly corrupt") to 100 ("very clean"). When ranked by score, Guinea-Bissau ranked 161st among the 182 countries in the Index, where the country ranked first is perceived to have the most honest public sector. From 2019 to 2023, Guinea-Bissau's score had either improved or remained steady every year from its low point in 2018, when it scored 16, but its 2024 and 2025 scores marked a drop of one point from 2023. For comparison with regional scores, the best score among sub-Saharan African countries (Note: Angola, Benin, Botswana, Burkina Faso, Burundi, Cameroon, Cape Verde, Central African Republic, Chad, Comoros, Côte d'Ivoire, Democratic Republic of the Congo, Djibouti, Equatorial Guinea, Eritrea, Eswatini, Ethiopia, Gabon, Gambia, Ghana, Guinea, Guinea-Bissau, Kenya, Lesotho, Liberia, Madagascar, Malawi, Mali, Mauritania, Mauritius, Mozambique, Namibia, Niger, Nigeria, Republic of the Congo, Rwanda, Sao Tome and Principe, Senegal, Seychelles, Sierra Leone, Somalia, South Africa, South Sudan, Sudan, Tanzania, Togo, Uganda, Zambia, and Zimbabwe.) was 68, the average was 32 and the worst was 9. For comparison with worldwide scores, the best score was 89 (ranked 1), the average was 42, and the worst was 9 (ranked 181, in a two-way tie). In 2013, Guinea-Bissau scored below the averages for both Africa and West Africa on the Mo Ibrahim Foundation’s Index of African Governance.

The Heritage Foundation stated that corruption is characteristic of the Bissau-Guinean government and economy. Government mismanagement in Guinea-Bissau, according to Transparency International's 2014 report on the country, has "created an environment conducive to corruption on a grand scale." There is a culture of impunity, and citizens have no right to access information.

Much of the corruption in Guinea-Bissau is related to the fact that the country is a hub of international drug trafficking. "Abject poverty, state collapse, lack of means and endemic corruption," states one source, "have made Guinea Bissau a heaven for the Colombian drug lords."

== Background ==
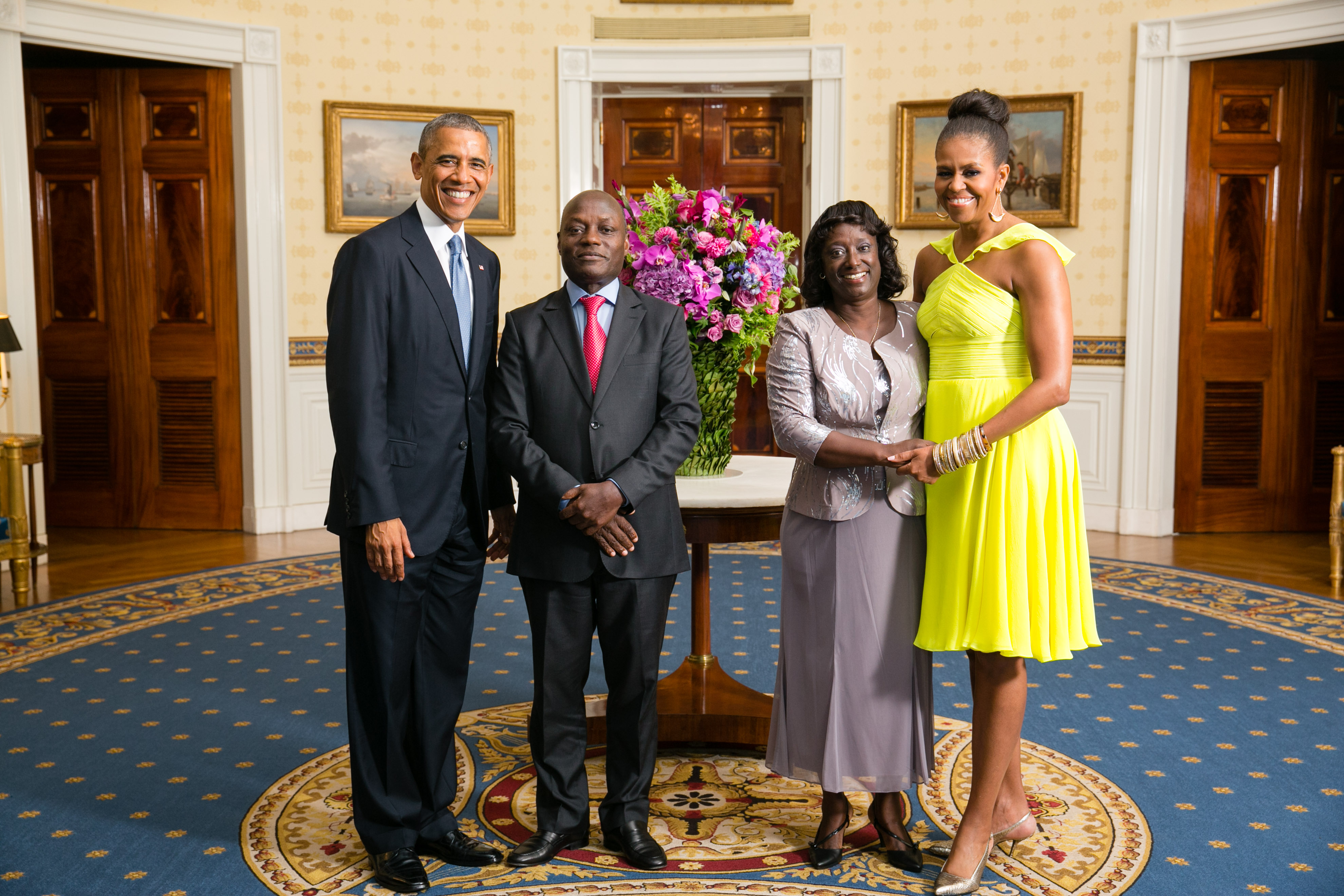
U.S. President Barack Obama and First Lady with President José Mário Vaz

A Transparency International report on Guinea-Bissau notes the systemic instability and mismanagement of the government, as testified to by the fact that none of its presidents has ever completed an entire term in office.

A former Portuguese colony and "one of the most fragile states in Africa," the nation won its independence in 1974 and has experienced several coups in the decades since then.

In recent times, low economic growth has made it difficult for government officials to manage patronage networks and compensate cronies, thus feeding the growth of other forms of illegal self-enrichment, notably trafficking in drugs and weapons. These trafficking networks have made the country a hub for illegal commerce.

There was some improvement in corruption between 2008 and 2011. Then, in 2012, the government was overthrown in a military coup, which brought an end to attempts to curb corruption and introduce other reforms. In 2014, voters elected José Mário Vaz to the presidency.

== Drug trafficking ==
The country has been a drug-trafficking hub since around the turn of the 21st century, and many of its political and military leaders are deeply involved in the drug trade. Illegal narcotics from Latin America make their way to Europe by way of Guinea-Bissau, which the United Nations Office on Drugs and Crime (UNODC) considers the world's only "narco-state". As of 2007, Colombian drug cartels had, for the past three years, been using Guinea-Bissau as a major transit point for European trafficking. At that time, according to the US DEA, 800–1000 kg of cocaine were being flown nightly into Guinea-Bissau with an additional amount coming in by sea.

Latin American cocaine barons, Der Spiegel has explained, look for corrupt nations in convenient geographic locations, as ideal for trafficking drugs. Authorities in Guinea-Bissau who seek to curb the drug traffic lack the most basic equipment, such as vehicles and radios, and often have insufficient gasoline supplies. The country has no able or willing force for law and order, creating the ideal hub for narco-trafficking. It also has poorly enforced border, unmonitored airfields, and a weak civilian government. In addition, it virtually never extradites anyone, as evidenced by the case of murderer and hijacker George Wright, who after his conviction in the U.S. worked for years in Guinea-Bissau as a basketball coach.

== Government ==
The government's fiscal operations are characterized by a lack of transparency, of predictability, of budgeting control, collusion among government and key personnel, and of external controls over public spending. High-ranking officials in the country have accumulated "unprecedented wealth and influence" and enjoy a high degree of impunity.

Political corruption consists largely of involvement in narcotics trafficking. This involvement, according to Transparency International, has overhauled patronage systems in Guinea-Bissau, ultimately lessening the state's role in corruption scheme, weakening the government as a whole.

=== President ===
Under the constitution, the President has extremely broad powers, including lawmaking authority and the ability to appoint judges. This makes it easy for him to abuse his power and accumulate wealth at the expense of the people. Critics have argued that the president's power should be limited in specific ways while the prime minister's, parliament's, attorney general's, the judiciary's powers are strengthened and reinforced. Critics have also called for a merit-based civil service.

=== Military, police, and security forces ===
Guinea-Bissau's security and law-enforcement sectors are vulnerable to corruption and interference by politicians. Inadequate pay scales for members of the police and correctional services make them more vulnerable to corruption. Criminality and brutality among Bissau-Guinean security forces are well documented, as are cases of senior officials bypassing police authority by releasing prisoners and confiscating cocaine. An unclear situation involving jurisdiction results in institutional conflicts, especially where criminal investigations are concerned.

Members of the police, security forces, and military are all involved in aiding and abetting the drug trade. For example, the military is engaged in leasing airbases and naval yards to drug traffickers, who have also rented islands to build front companies to mask plane movements. Also, the drug trade has helped breed a culture of intimidation and violence within the military.

=== Judiciary ===
The judiciary lacks adequate resources and training and also lacks independence. It does not pursue corruption charges. No one in the country has ever been prosecuted for or convicted of money laundering. The public largely distrusts the nation's court system, due to the high costs of seeking justice and the lack of ethics, that leads people to solve disputes outside the legal system.

Judicial corruption is a discouragement to business, according to roughly a quarter of companies that responded a World Bank 2006 Enterprise Survey. A 2001 Amnesty International report suggested that the dismissal of several Supreme Court judges and clerks were related to judicial decisions that displeased the government.

== Impact on business ==
In a 2006 World Bank survey, 44% of firms said that corruption was a major hindrance to business. In 2008, 27.6% of firms in Guinea-Bissau had been asked for bribes at least once; in Africa as a whole, the figure was 22.3%, and in the entire world, the figure was 17.4%. In the same year, fully 48.9% of firms in Guinea-Bissau said they had given “gifts” to win government contracts, as compared to 31.1% of firms in Africa generally. Almost two-thirds of firms in the country said they had been expected to bribe public officials in order to accomplish certain ends. For manufacturers operating in Guinea-Bissau, bribes could reach up to 4.4% of costs.

== Anti-corruption efforts ==
Guinea-Bissau has few institutions or laws that are intended to fight corruption. Like other countries in Lusophone Africa, it lacks a formal ethics code, has an inadequate number of external auditors, and has weak quality control.

The Committee Against Corruption, created in 1995, was intended to address and prevent acts of corruption within the government and elsewhere. The Court of Accounts, the leading audit institution, was introduced in 2006 to audit the accounts and budget of the Ministry of Finance. Guinea-Bissau has ratified several United Nations Conventions combatting corruption as well as the African Union's Convention on Corruption. In 2008, Guinea-Bissau was found to be non-compliant with 34 of the 49 Financial Action Task Force (FATF) statutes, which cover such matters as due diligence and the criminalization of terrorism financing.

In 2009, the country reformed its procurement system in conformity with West African Economic Monetary Union guidelines. This reform involved the establishment of a new regulatory body, the formation of a public procurement department, the institution of an audit unit to vet the central unit's procurement transactions, and the introduction of a new procurement infrastructure.

A new system for managing public expenditure, instituted in or shortly before 2010, helped control government expenses by obliging every government office to submit an annual budget and progress reports to parliament. As of 2011, the country planned a comprehensive set of anti-corruption reforms. After the 2012 military coup, however, reform efforts were ended.

Some drug arrests have been made, including arrests of military officials, but defendants have not been successfully prosecuted. In March 2012, former Procurator General announced investigations into the murders of President João Vieira and the Commander of the military, General Tagme Na Waie, had halted due to difficulty in gathering evidence.

In August 2015, President Jose Mario Vaz dismissed Prime Minister Domingos Pereira and the members of his cabinet, accusing them of corruption, nepotism, and obstruction of justice. The UN and GIABA helped establish Guinea-Bissau's Financial Intelligence Unit, but its resources are too limited for it to be able to exercise its functions.

=== U.S. actions ===
In April 2013, the US arrested the head of Guinea-Bissau's navy in international waters on drug-trafficking charges. He was receiving commissions of $1 million per ton for facilitating the shipment of illicit drugs into the US and Europe.

In the same year, a US grand jury indicted the head of Guinea-Bissau's armed forces for trafficking cocaine and weapons.

== See also ==
- Economy of Guinea-Bissau
- International Anti-Corruption Academy
- Group of States Against Corruption
- International Anti-Corruption Day
- ISO 37001 Anti-bribery management systems
- United Nations Convention against Corruption
- OECD Anti-Bribery Convention
- Transparency International
