= Corruption in Eritrea =

Corruption in Eritrea is widespread, with bribes required for most government services. In its early post-independence years, Eritrea was viewed as relatively corruption-free and having a strong anti-corruption culture. However, key international metrics, have shown a progressive decline in Eritrea's anti-corruption mechanisms. As of 2024, the government’s official goal of containing corruption to have been effectively abandoned, and military personnel and civil servants are usually not prosecuted for corruption.

Eritrea has not joined the UN Convention against Corruption or any other international anti-corruption initiatives. There are no independent NGOs in Eritrea, including those that investigate corruption. No government agencies or watchdogs exist independently of the ruling PFDJ party in Eritrea to report corruption to.

On Transparency International's 2024 and 2025 Corruption Perceptions Index, Eritrea scored 13 on a scale from 0 ("highly corrupt") to 100 ("very clean"). These are the worst scores Eritrea has ever received since the current scoring methodology was adopted in 2012; its best score ever was 25 in that year. When ranked by score, Eritrea ranked 177th among the 182 countries in the 2025 Index, where the country ranked first is perceived to have the most honest public sector. In the 2025 Index, sub-Saharan African nations (Note: Angola, Benin, Botswana, Burkina Faso, Burundi, Cameroon, Cape Verde, Central African Republic, Chad, Comoros, Côte d'Ivoire, Democratic Republic of the Congo, Djibouti, Equatorial Guinea, Eritrea, Eswatini, Ethiopia, Gabon, Gambia, Ghana, Guinea, Guinea-Bissau, Kenya, Lesotho, Liberia, Madagascar, Malawi, Mali, Mauritania, Mauritius, Mozambique, Namibia, Niger, Nigeria, Republic of the Congo, Rwanda, Sao Tome and Principe, Senegal, Seychelles, Sierra Leone, Somalia, South Africa, South Sudan, Sudan, Tanzania, Togo, Uganda, Zambia, and Zimbabwe.) averaged 32, with scores ranging from 9 to 68. Worldwide, countries averaged 42 in 2025, with scores ranging from 9 to 89.

== Background ==
Eritrea became independent from Ethiopia in 1991 after the Eritrean War of independence, and its independence was formalized in 1993 through a UN-supervised referendum. The decades of war had planted the seeds of many social and economic problems, including corruption. At that time, Eritrea had a weak private sector with few skilled workers. The War with Ethiopia from 1998 to 2000 and its aftermath has further destabilized Eritrea.

The 2006 Bertelsmann Stiftung report noted that while cases of corruption since independence existed, corruption in Eritrea was relatively low. However, Bertelsmann Stiftung's 2024 BTI Transformation Index found corruption to have become widespread in the civil and military administration. It noted the lack of civil liberties, institutional checks and balances, and auditing of state spending in Eritrea.

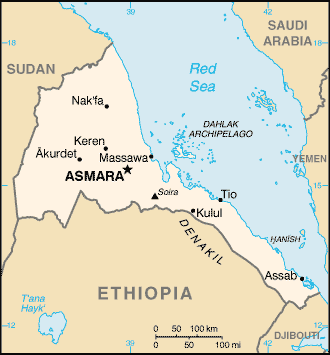
Eritrea's location on the Red Sea

== Factors ==
Eritrea lacks a separation of powers, and President Isaias Afwerki, in office since 1993, has been accused of suppressing free speech, shutting down private newspapers, shrinking the private sector, and imposing indefinite military service. Eritrea's business community is composed mainly of personal associates of the regime's economic officials, fronts for top-level officials of the ruling party, and people who "enjoy the patronage of senior officers of the security and military establishments." The government "controls all foreign exchanges" and is "virtually the only legal source of imports," a situation that makes it possible for military and government officials to profit by collaborating with illegal smugglers. Similarly, the country's strict laws about importation and the inconsistency in the granting of exit visas enable customs and immigration officials to profit from bribery and money laundering. A 2014 report described institutional corruption has "erode[d] the foundations" of economic development. The state's control on the economy allows for little private investment, while extremely low government salaries encourage corruption.

== Media freedom ==
The lack of an independent press has also contributed to the spread and persistence of corruption. Eritrea has been described as "Africa's biggest prison for the media." The only news media are government-owned, and experts compare them to the Soviet media.

== Judiciary ==
The Eritrean Constitution, which calls for a separation of the judiciary, executive, and legislative branches, has never been implemented. Eritrea had not yet held free elections.

The National Assembly had last met in 2002; opposition parties were prohibited, as were civic organizations, the right to assemble, and freedom of the press; the judiciary was inactive; the ruling party, government, and military formed "one single conglomerate of power" with "a low level of transparency." Since 2001, civil liberties were "gradually restricted," with "numerous arbitrary arrests" and human-rights violations on an "alarming" scale. From 150th place on Transparency International's 2012 Corruption Perceptions Index, Eritrea dropped to 166th in 2014.

Instead there is a judicial system consisting of two separate court systems: Regular Courts that adjudicate disputes based on law and Special Courts that adjudicate disputes that are not based on law. The latter courts are supposed to address corruption, but have been considered to be "one of the most corrupt and inhumane court systems" globally.

== Military ==
A 2013 report by Transparency International UK called Eritrea the "most militarised country in Africa," with about 20% of its population in uniform. For this reason, many have called Eritrea the 'North Korea' of Africa. The army is not only large but also one of the nine most corrupt armed forces in the world, along with Algeria, Angola, Cameroon, the DRC, Egypt, Libya, Syria, and Yemen. According to Transparency International UK, there is a possible scheme in place of public funds earmarked for "secret" military purposes in the name of national security which are in truth appropriated illicitly. There are said to be several military-owned businesses with "unauthorised private enterprise by military personnel."

== Nationalization ==
In 1996, Eritrea's government declared that all land would henceforth be considered the property of the state and would be re-distributed in accordance with need. It then confiscated a good deal of private land and turned it over to former soldiers, foreign investors, and resettlement programs. The 1990s also saw the privatization of some companies, and since 2000 the government has increasingly intervened in the economy and commerce and propagandized against private trade and business. These activities have involved a considerable amount of favoritism, kickbacks, and other forms of corruption.

The increase in state ownership in Eritrea has been critiqued as a step back for economic freedom and for doing business generally, partly because it has caused rising corruption. The 2012 Index of Economic Freedom, published by The Heritage Foundation, named Eritrea the second-worst country in sub-Saharan Africa for economic liberty. The World Bank's Ease of Doing Business Project Index for 2011 ranked Eritrea at 180th, with only three countries, Guinea-Bissau, Central African Republic, and Chad, scoring worse. It has been suggested that since the government maintains control over foreign exchange, friends of government personnel are allowed to bring goods into the country and sell them at great profit, thus increasing opportunities for corruption.

== Mining Industry ==
In July 2013, Martin Plaut reported that since 2011, the government had earned over $900 million from the Bisha gold mine, but it was not known what had happened to the money. Even as the state was reportedly amassing huge mining profits, Plaut charged, poverty and hardship were worsening. "There is some evidence," he stated, "that show the [government] is gambling and squandering state resources without any accountability."

== Persecution of Christians ==
Eritrea, as of 2011, was one of eight nations considered to be Countries of Particular Concern (CPC) by the US State Department owing to the abuse and persecution of Christians other than those belonging to the three recognized denominations: the Eritrean Orthodox Tewahedo Church, the Eritrean Catholic Church, and the Evangelical Lutheran Church of Eritrea. "Up to 3,000 Christians from unregistered church groups were held in detention" in 2011, according to Amnesty International. Between 2002 and 2011, many churches were closed, and tens of thousands of Christians fled the country; state-owned media have told the public that suppressed Christian groups were being paid by the CIA to destabilize the government, and have actively encouraged citizens to turn in persons whom they suspect of holding prayer meetings in their homes. This mass religious persecution has provided an opportunity for extensive corruption of a specific kind on the part of ruling-party politicians and military officials, who have arrested suspected Christians under the country's official anti-Christian policy and held them in prisons, unofficial detention centers, and military barracks in exchange for ransom.

== Anti-corruption efforts ==
There is reportedly no real organized effort in Eritrea to combat corruption. The regime has been described as using a "so-called war on corruption" to crack down on political dissenters and opponents. In May 2015, the president urged a group of party and government officials to discuss American and European pressure on Eritrea to reform its government and release detainees, yet when some of those officials proposed that the government reform in certain areas to appease Western nations that send aid to Eritrea, the president underscored the need to stand up to pressure from the "hegemonic West." Business leaders in Eritrea were reportedly "shivering with fear" over what the president's comments might signify; it was said to be unclear if the rumors signified a wave of jailing or not. Shortly after the aforementioned meeting, the president addressed the country on the 24th anniversary of Eritrean independence, denouncing "deluded and corrupt" state officials who, he charged, amassed wealth illegitimately.

Eritrea is one of the few nations that has neither ratified nor signed the United Nations Convention against Corruption.

== See also ==
- International Anti-Corruption Academy
- Group of States against Corruption
- International Anti-Corruption Day
- ISO 37001 Anti-bribery management systems
- OECD Anti-Bribery Convention
- Transparency International
