= Corruption in Tunisia =

Corruption in Tunisia is widely regarded amongst Tunisians to be among the top five issues facing the country today. Since the end of colonial rule, Tunisia has been marked by corrupt and authoritarian leaders. After the revolution of 2011 came numerous committees to tackle this issue. The Investigative Committee for Acts of Corruption and Bribery Committed Under the Former President was one such committee, however it failed to deal with the more widespread issues of corruption. State-owned companies and companies owned by influential families continue to enjoy a privileged position, while those at the bottom struggle with everyday necessities.

== History of corruption ==
Since the end of colonial rule, Tunisia had only two presidents until 2011. This early period of independence was marked by widespread corruption of the authoritarian rulers. The last leader before the revolution, Ben Ali, his family members, and his inner circle, all held considerable power over industries within the state. One of the primary goals of the Tunisian people and government in the past decade has been to address and rectify the consequences of past corruption, and create legislative bodies and policies to limit corruption going forward.

== Corruption in the modern age ==
It is estimated that Tunisia lost more than US$1 billion per year between 2000 and 2008 due to corruption, bribery, kickbacks, trade mispricing and criminal activities.

The National Constituent Assembly developed an anti-corruption initiative in December 2012 which aims to establish a national integrity system, to promote the independent National Anti-Corruption Authority, and to boost civil society participation in corruption prevention. However, the government's effort is still considered limited. Corruption is still a serious problem yet it is less pervasive when compared to the neighboring countries.

The role of middlemen is very important for doing business in Tunisia, and many investors consider that having the right connections when collaborating on business to overcome administrative hurdles to investment and public procurement is crucial. State-owned companies or private groups owned by influential families continue to enjoy a privileged position, with close political and administrative ties and easier access to financing.

The new government of Tunisia has made efforts to deal with the legacy of corruption from past regimes. After the revolution of 2011 came the formation of numerous committees within the government. The Investigative Committee for Acts of Corruption and Bribery Committed Under the Former President was one such committee, determining the extent of corruption within numerous sectors of public and private institutions. This committee's performance left many Tunisians dissatisfied. Of the numerous reports that were filed by citizens, only a small minority of them were dealt with, many of which focused on the president and his circle.

While corruption in Tunisia is widely regarded as pervasive, actions are being taken by the government in order to overcome this. Article 11 of the Tunisian constitution states that public officials are required to publicize their financial earnings. However, only 12% of the Tunisian parliament has done so. Article 32 of the constitution allows citizens to freely request information, and in 2016 a government department was created to facilitate this. This policy was not implemented perfectly, as Prime Minister Chahed stated civil servants must request permission from superiors before publicly discussing this information. The government has however passed an order for the protection of whistleblowers, allowing for increased transparency within the state.

The government's efforts to reduce corruption have seen limited success. One of the steps taken by the government was the arrest of several high-profile individuals within Tunisia. However, these arrests have left many concerned with the prisoner’s treatment, and human rights violations are speculated to be occurring. The population of Tunisia has had mixed feelings over the extent and severity of corruption; although Tunisia has moved towards a more democratic government, this has made corruption more widespread, though less intense. What was once a small circle, centered around the autocratic President Ben Ali, has transformed into several smaller circles of corruption within the parliament, police, and many other government bodies. On March 20 2015, President Caid proposed a law that would limit the authority of the Truth and Dignity Body to address financial issue, and allow anonymity to those accused. The bill proved wildly unpopular, and due to pressure from social groups, The National Council of the Bar Association asked for it to be overturned. Many Tunisians have pointed out that the bill would grant amnesty to public employees and set a dangerous precedent of undermining the justice system.

In April 2025, a Tunisian court handed down lengthy prison sentences ranging from 13 to 66 years to dozens of opposition figures accused of conspiring against state security. The trial, widely criticized by human rights groups and legal observers, was emblematic of what critics described as President Kais Saied’s increasingly authoritarian governance. Among the approximately 40 defendants were former justice ministers, diplomats, intelligence officials, and political opponents, including members of the National Salvation Front and leaders from the Ennahdha party. Many were accused of belonging to a terrorist group and colluding with foreign powers, though the evidence and judicial process were condemned as opaque and politically motivated. Notably, some defendants, such as French intellectual Bernard-Henri Lévy, were tried in absentia. The crackdown is part of a broader erosion of judicial independence following Saied’s 2021 dissolution of parliament and dismissal of the prime minister; actions the opposition called a "coup." Human Rights Watch and other organizations have accused Saied’s government of weaponizing the judiciary to suppress dissent and stifle political opposition, raising significant concerns about the rule of law and systemic corruption in post-revolution Tunisia.

== Public ranking and polling ==
On Transparency International's 2025 Corruption Perceptions Index, Tunisia scored 39 on a scale from 0 ("highly corrupt") to 100 ("very clean"). When ranked by score, Tunisia ranked 91st among the 182 countries in the Index, where the country ranked first is perceived to have the most honest public sector. For comparison with regional scores, the best score among Middle Eastern and North African countries (Note: Algeria, Bahrain, Egypt, Iran, Iraq, Israel, Jordan, Kuwait, Lebanon, Libya, Morocco, Oman, Qatar, Saudi Arabia, Syria, Tunisia, United Arab Emirates, and Yemen) was 69, the average was 39 and the worst was 13. For comparison with worldwide scores, the best score was 89 (ranked 1), the average was 42, and the worst was 9 (ranked 181 in a two-way tie).

Corruption in Tunisia is often discussed in public and political circles of the region as being one of the most prominent issues affecting the country today. In a series of polls conducted by the International Republican Institute, corruption consistently ranked highly among the issues facing Tunisia. 83% of those surveyed were disappointed with the progress of the country, with 26% of respondents stating they were unable to afford food and other necessities. 89% felt the economic situation was negative.

When asked what the largest issue in Tunisia was, corruption was among the top 5 results, even being present at the local level. Respondents were asked what issues were prominent within their own communities, and corruption of the government came up once again.

Addressing the steps needed to be taken by the government, many of those surveyed picked issues involving the economy and unemployment, as well as living standards. After this, the next highest result showed corruption and transparency, only ranking slightly lower. While corruption was not the most prominent issue according to those surveyed, it still was important. When questioned how the government of Tunisia should address these issues of unemployment and low standards of living, the number one answer given was reducing corruption to adequately fund government programs addressing these problems.

== See also ==
- International Anti-Corruption Academy
- Group of States Against Corruption
- International Anti-Corruption Day
- ISO 37001 Anti-bribery management systems
- United Nations Convention against Corruption
- OECD Anti-Bribery Convention
- Transparency International
