= Corruption in Albania =

Corruption in Albania scored 42 out of 100 on Transparency International's Corruption Perceptions Index in 2024, an improvement from its score of 37 the previous year; a higher score signifies a lesser perception of public-sector corruption. Albania has made progress in its fight against corruption through the work of the Special Structure against Corruption and Organized Crime (SPAK), which has gained public trust by prosecuting high-level officials, including former ministers, members of Parliament, and mayors. Notably, investigations have also been launched against a former president and prime minister.

Corruption has been a problem in Albania for many years. It can happen in different areas, including government, politics, public contracts, and the justice system.

== Corruption and human development in Albania ==
After 1990, Albania has passed from a centralized economy to a liberal one. Liberalization has brought both mainly negative effects to the politics, economy and other social aspect. There are two main components that measure a country's progress toward success. Firstly, the economic growth is the most used and discussed indicator of the progress.

During the last two decades, the economists have been more interested in the economic development, consisting of the aggregate of health, education level and income rather than economic growth. Secondly, the corruption level is found to be a significant component of progress. Different researches have founded out a negative relationship between corruption level and countries’ progress.

Empirical research of Hysa (2011) reveals that there is a statistically significant negative relationship between corruption indexes and human development. Empirical evidence of the study, comparing Albania with the EU member countries, suggests that more corrupted countries tend to have lower levels of human development. In the Albanian case, the relationship between corruption and human development is found to be much stronger than in the EU countries.

Albania has been trying to fight corruption in recent years. One important organization is SPAK, which investigates corruption and organized crime, including cases involving government officials. SPAK has investigated and prosecuted several corruption cases. However, there are still concerns about corruption in the country, and more work is needed to make the government and justice system more transparent and trustworthy.

Albania still has problems with corruption. According to Transparency International, Albania scored 39 out of 100 on its Corruption Perceptions Index and ranked 91st out of 182 countries. This shows that corruption is still a concern in the country.

The European Commission also reported in 2025 that Albania has made progress in fighting corruption, but there is still more that needs to be done. In particular, the country needs to improve how corruption cases are investigated, prosecuted, and handled in court, especially when high-level officials are involved.

== International rankings ==
Transparency International's 2024 Corruption Perceptions Index scored Albania at 42 on a scale from 0 ("highly corrupt") to 100 ("very clean").

When ranked by score, Albania ranked 80th among the 180 countries in the Index, where the country ranked first is perceived to have the most honest public sector. For comparison with regional scores, the best score among Eastern European and Central Asian countries (Note: Albania, Armenia, Azerbaijan, Belarus, Bosnia and Herzegovina, Georgia, Kazakhstan, Kosovo, Kyrgyzstan, Moldova, Montenegro, North Macedonia, Russia, Serbia, Tajikistan, Turkey, Turkmenistan, Ukraine, Uzbekistan) was 53, the average score was 35 and the worst score was 17. For comparison with worldwide scores, the best score was 90 (ranked 1), the average score was 43, and the worst score was 8 (ranked 180).

== See also ==
- Special Structure against Corruption and Organized Crime
- Corruption in Kosovo
- International Anti-Corruption Academy
- Group of States Against Corruption
- International Anti-Corruption Day
- ISO 37001 Anti-bribery management systems
- United Nations Convention against Corruption
- OECD Anti-Bribery Convention
- Transparency International
