= Corruption in Bahrain =

Corruption in Bahrain is an ongoing concern for the nation. Bahrain became a party to the United Nations Convention against Corruption in 2010 after signing it in 2005.

== Statistical evaluations ==
In Transparency International's 2025 Corruption Perceptions Index, Bahrain scored 50 on a scale from 0 ("highly corrupt") to 100 ("very clean"). When ranked by score, Bahrain ranked 56th among the 182 countries in the Index, where the country ranked first is perceived to have the most honest public sector. For comparison with regional scores, the best score among Middle Eastern and North African countries (Note: Algeria, Bahrain, Egypt, Iran, Iraq, Israel, Jordan, Kuwait, Lebanon, Libya, Morocco, Oman, Qatar, Saudi Arabia, Syria, Tunisia, United Arab Emirates, and Yemen) was 69, the average was 39 and the worst was 13. For comparison with worldwide scores, the best score was 89 (ranked 1), the average was 42, and the worst was 9 (ranked 181 in a two-way tie).

Years	2012	2013	2014	2015	2016	2017	2018	2019	2020	2021	2022	2023	2024	2025
Corruption Perceptions Index score	51	48	49	51	43	36	36	42	42	42	44	42	53	50

Scores are on a 0-100 scale, with 0 being a perception of very low public sector honesty and 100 being a perception of very high public sector honesty.

== Notable incidents of fraud and corruption ==
- Alcoa-Alba corruption case, a $6m bribe case.

== See also ==
- Bahrain Transparency Society
- International Anti-Corruption Academy
- Group of States Against Corruption
- International Anti-Corruption Day
- ISO 37001 Anti-bribery management systems
- United Nations Convention against Corruption
- OECD Anti-Bribery Convention
- Transparency International
