= Corruption in Israel =

Corruption in Israel is a legitimate problem and many investigations have taken place into allegations of influence peddling and bribery.

Transparency International's 2025 Corruption Perceptions Index, which scored 182 countries on a scale from 0 ("highly corrupt") to 100 ("very clean"), gave Israel a score of 62. When ranked by score, Israel ranked 35th among the 182 countries in the Index, where the country ranked first is perceived to have the most honest public sector. Compared to regional scores, the best score among Middle Eastern and North African countries (Note: Algeria, Bahrain, Egypt, Iran, Iraq, Israel, Jordan, Kuwait, Lebanon, Libya, Morocco, Oman, Qatar, Saudi Arabia, Syria, Tunisia, United Arab Emirates, and Yemen) was 69, the average was 39 and the worst was 13. For comparison with worldwide scores, the best score was 89 (ranked 1), the average was 42, and the worst was 9 (ranked 181 in a two-way tie).

The judiciary is considered by businesses to be at low risk of corruption; however, the public services sector is reported to have a moderate risk of corruption, with business leaders reporting the payment of bribes in exchange for access to public utilities, with an ineffective bureaucratic government being considered by some to be the source of the problem.

In 2019 Prime Minister Benjamin Netanyahu was indicted for corruption, due to the acceptance of expensive gifts such as fine champagne and cigars totaling a value of approximately $198,000.

== See also ==
- List of Israeli public officials convicted of crimes or misdemeanors
- Anti-Netanyahu Protests
- Trial of Benjamin Netanyahu
- Qatari connection affair
- International Anti-Corruption Academy
- Group of States Against Corruption
- International Anti-Corruption Day
- ISO 37001 Anti-bribery management systems
- United Nations Convention against Corruption
- OECD Anti-Bribery Convention
- Transparency International
