= Slush fund =

Fund used for illegal purposes

In accounting, a slush fund is a monetary fund or account used for miscellaneous income and expenses, particularly when these are corrupt or illegal. Such funds may be kept hidden and maintained separately from money that is used for legitimate purposes. Slush funds may be employed by government or corporate officials in efforts to pay influential people discreetly in return for preferential treatment, advance information (such as non-public information in financial transactions), and other services. The funds themselves may not be kept secret, but the source of the funds, or how they were acquired, or for what purposes they are used, may be hidden. Use of slush funds to influence government activities may be viewed as subversive of the democratic process.

A slush fund can also be a reserve account used to reduce fluctuations in an organization's earnings by withholding them when they are high and supplementing them when they are low. This type of slush fund is not inherently corrupt, but is nonetheless a form of earnings management that tends to mislead stakeholders about the organization's financial condition.

== Examples ==
Richard Nixon's "Checkers speech" of 1952 was a somewhat successful effort to dispel a scandal concerning a slush fund of campaign contributions. Years later, Nixon's presidential re-election campaign used slush funds to buy the silence of the "White House Plumbers".

Financial derivative traders for Enron employed a slush fund system called "prudency reserves", in which the department reported part of each trade's profit or loss to the company and withheld the remainder. This system was originally used to regulate the trading department's profits, but also enabled the company to conceal large profits during the 2000–01 California electricity crisis.

Hockey Canada maintained three slush funds to pay for sexual assault settlements perpetrated by ice hockey players and other uninsured claims. Membership fees from across Canada were used to fund at least one of these slush funds. The existence and purpose of these slush funds were discovered during the Hockey Canada sexual assault scandal in 2022. $7.6 million in 11 sexual assault settlements were paid out by these funds between 1989 and 2022.

Beginning in November 2023, it was revealed that high-ranking members of Japan's ruling Liberal Democratic Party had systematically under-reported campaign contributions that amounted to over ¥600 million, instead keeping the funds for personal use. The scandal led to the dissolutions of the implicated Shisuikai and Seiwakai party factions, as well as the resignation of Prime Minister Fumio Kishida.

In the United States, as of May 2026, the proposed US$1.776 billion Anti-Weaponization Fund, which forms part of the settlement in Trump v. Internal Revenue Service, has been characterized as a slush fund for its benefits to those who took part in the January 6 United States Capitol attack, as well as unclear details about how the money itself would be dispersed.

== Etymology ==
"Slush fund" was originally a nautical term for the cash that a ship's crew raised by selling fat (slush) scraped from cooking pots to tallow makers. This cash was kept separate from the ship's accounts and used to make small purchases for the crew.

The alternative term reptile fund was coined in the second half of the 19th century, when Otto von Bismarck paid journalists out of a special fund to publish anti-British pieces.

== See also ==
- Caixa dois
- Group of States Against Corruption
- International Anti-Corruption Academy
- ISO 37001 Anti-bribery management systems
- OECD Anti-Bribery Convention
- United Nations Convention against Corruption
