= Maritime anti-corruption =

Efforts to combat corruption in maritime industry

Maritime anti-corruption initiatives have emerged in the last decades as a response to the growing threat of transnational corruption in the maritime domain, specifically in the shipping industry which is responsible for around 90% of world trade. In the past, paying bribes at ports to pass through customs was perceived as normal behavior, but such activities resulting in higher operational costs lead to increasingly stricter national and international anti-corruption regulations being put in place.

Initially, international conferences addressing the safety of life and prevention of collisions were the basis for anti-corruption regulation. In the second half of the 20th century, many organizations were formed, such as the International Association of Ports and Harbors, the Baltic and International Maritime Council (BIMCO), and the International Maritime Organization (IMO) - originally named Inter-Governmental Maritime Consultative Organization (IMCO) – which are still relevant actors in maritime industry governance today.

Regulatory improvements in the industry included e.g., the Port State Control system, established in the early 1980s. The purpose of the system was to enforce regulation on ship operators who bypassed previous rules by “flagging out” to commercial registries. The Port State Control officers check vessels for compliance with international standards (ratified by the home state of the vessel). Serious transgressions can lead to fees, detainment of ships and in the worst case, the loss of the entire business. In time, the level of authority granted to Port State Control officers led to corruption spreading among them, officers frequently demanding bribe in exchange for a positive report.

Two decades after the launch of the Port State Control System, in 2002, the IMO extended the ‘Safety of Life at Sea Convention of 1974 (SOLAS) with Chapter XI.2 (Special measures to enhance maritime security). Thus, the organization approved the ‘International Ship and Port Facility Security (ISPS) Code’, which increasingly helped to differentiate between maritime safety and security. The ISPS code also clearly outlines port security-related requirements and a list of recommendations to meet these for all shipping companies, port authorities and contracting governments.

Beyond the IMO regulations, states also declared mandatory national initiatives in parallel, which bind vessels and cargos to further regulation when sailing through certain waters. The increasingly international nature of shipping and its regulations have led to private and public actors engaging in collective initiatives from the 2010s onwards, typically manifested through the Maritime Anti-Corruption Network.

== Forms of Maritime Corruption ==
Corruption can be defined in various ways. For example, according to the Oxford Dictionary, corruption is “dishonest or illegal behavior, especially of people in authority”. Huntington (1989) defined it somewhat differently, by describing corruption as “the behavior, exhibited by public officials which deviates from accepted norms in order to serve private aims”. These definitions are also correct for maritime corruption specifically, however, in this field corruption can be categorized in different ways – especially at ports.

Sequeira and Djankov (2014) distinguish between two types of corruption at ports: collusive and coercive corruption. Under collusive corruption, public officials and private agents share illicit transaction-generated rents, while under coercive corruption, public bureaucrats force private agents to pay additional fees to be able to gain access to public services and goods.

Maritime corruption can also be grouped according to its different forms. DiDomenico (2020) categorizes bribes and facilitation payments as the most common forms of maritime corruption, and lists other forms such as gifts, compensation, contract awards and promises to influence decision, vote or outcome.

Lastly, maritime corruption may be categorized according to various fraud scenarios, such as:

- under-invoicing, where the merchandise in question is declared of lower value than the actual sale price in the invoice,
- bribes paid to gain contracts, where large shipping and commercial vessel companies bid for long-term contracts from large exporters,
- illicit payments to marine surveyors, so that the surveyor is paid illegally in order to give a better review of the inspected vessel,
- facilitation payments to customs officers, where bribes are paid to officers to ensure smooth customs procedures and to turn a blind eye to certain procedural requirements,
- and illegal purchase of letters of credit, where payment is promised for certain documents which validate that goods have been delivered as required.

=== Maritime corruption as a cross-cutting, facilitating crime ===
Crucially, scholars have also been pointing out how corruption is a facilitating crime to other illegal activities in the maritime domain. DiDomenico herself mentions corruption as a crime that cultivates a “toxic environment” for e.g., fraud or tax evasion, which can deter foreign investment and can halt economic growth in the given country. Individual corruption of port employees, police, custom or border agents is also seen as a key enabler to illicit trade and trafficking, as getting across border security, checks, taxes and other forms of certifications require inside (specialist) knowledge. Finally, Krause Hansen (2018) connects maritime grand corruption to a much wider scale, by suggesting that it may be entangled with illegal financing of political parties and extractive operating in areas of limited statehood.

== Corruption in the shipping industry ==
Elements of the maritime industry such as seaports and terminals have always been important areas of social and economic opportunities. Ports are key strategic sectors, playing key economic, internal and international security roles for both developed and developing countries. The strategic importance of ports and other maritime resources have led to the industry being criticized by Maersk, a major shipping company, as "an environment where facilitation payments and extortion are common occurrences". In the EU specifically, coastal regions and major sea ports have shown to present the highest risks of corruption. Europe's coastal borders have increasingly been subject to corruption pressure by smugglers in the past few years. In addition, border guards and local government officials are often involved in corruption schemes related to cross-border trade. Typically, in European small coastal towns, the corruption of border guards is often related to corruption in local authorities. Several ports in Europe have been identified by the Center for the Study of Democracy as having extreme vulnerability to corruption pressures:

- Greece:
  - Patra Port
  - Igoumenititsa Port
  - Pireaeus Port
- Spain:
  - Port of Meililla
  - Ceuta Port
  - Blue borders near Galicia
- France:
  - Marseille-Porto Vecchio Sea Port

There are several possible causes of this dangerous environment, and many point to the very nature of the shipping industry. Frequent port calls all over the world, each country with different laws and regulations, mixed with heavy bureaucracy leaves the crews of these ships exposed to abuses of power and demands for illicit payments by the port authorities and government officials. The Conference of Business Integrity listed several factors that contribute to the shipping industry's struggle with corruption:

- The presence or lack of clear procedures in any areas of port operation;
- Exercise of discretionary powers by customs officers and other port agencies;
- Existence or absence of a system of bottlenecks made possible due to wide discretionary powers of port officials (and the likelihood of these being used to create extortion opportunities);
- Payments for services not rendered by port agencies;
- Availability or absence of complaints/feedback desks/redress mechanisms and the effectiveness of such where available

Due to these challenges, corruption in the maritime domain lives and breathes, which cause several risks and costs to the industry as well. Vanessa C. DiDomenico (2020) summarized these risks and costs as follows:

- First and foremost, if compliance with local requirements is not fulfilled, the very safety of the ship's officers and crew is in jeopardy.
- Corruption can also be very costly for business – according to Andy Knight and his colleagues, it may put an extra 10% financial burden on the costs of doing business at various ports of the world
- Corruption can also create inequalities in the free market by slowing down processes for businesses seeking to remain honest. Additionally, the differing anti-corruption laws of individual countries can also cause concerns about companies’ competitiveness under stricter and less-stringent legislation

There are also social costs to corruption such as:

- Corruption leads to further inequalities, extremism and conflict within society, as it targets the vulnerable and poor segments disproportionately – especially in developing countries where cargo must travel from the ports through inland communities.
- Due to corruption, public resources originally set aside for services, such as infrastructure projects, healthcare or education, may be redirected to tackle corruption.

These challenges and risks have led to companies and organizations calling for the establishment of a strategic framework for a more transparent and consistent port or terminal system. However, major challenge when governments or organizations attempt to implement this kind of strategic framework is the current lack of clear procedures backed up by laws as well as the discretionary power of custom officers and other port authorities. Even when there are established transparent and consistent procedures, officials have still been able to use discretion on assessing access or noncompliance fees. This is a major challenge that the companies conducting business in Nigeria have encountered. Although policies may be put into place by national authorities, individual officer non-compliance is a major issue to the extent that the National Port Authority as an organization becomes incompetent in effective management of ports. Furthermore, ship crew are fearful of reporting corruption due to the risk of being blacklisted from the industry in retaliation. One way that the National Port Authority has tried to gain some sense of control and awareness of how much corruption is really going on is the implementation of grievance mechanisms. However, only 73% of ports/terminals customers have ever actually used these grievance mechanisms. The inability for national authorities to control the issue of corruption on their own has led to an increasing number of collective action initiatives that combine private companies, regional organizations, and national/local governments as the main actors. These initiatives are typically manifested through the MACN.

== Maritime Anti-Corruption Network (MACN) ==
The Maritime Anti-Corruption Network can best be defined as a certifying business coalition, a coalition between competitors that arguably enhances the strongest degree of fairness between stakeholders by forcing companies to actively create a level playing field. The Maritime Anti-Corruption Network, or MACN, can best be defined as a certifying business coalition, a coalition between competitors that arguably enhances the strongest degree of fairness between stakeholders by forcing companies to actively create a level playing field. The MACN was founded by the Business for Social Responsibility (BSR) in 2011, triggered by the adoption of the U.K Bribery Act which obliged companies to have ‘adequate procedures’ in place to prevent bribery. Therefore, an official launch took place in 2012, with the first collective action implemented with the UNDP in Nigeria. A year later, the organization established its Anonymous Incident Reporting System, which was followed by sharing anti-corruption e-learning material for members and a new project in Argentina in 2014. By 2017, the MACN already had 90 members, including the industry's most influential members. The members take up a large variety of actors in the industry, consisting of vessel owners, companies, ports and terminal operators, associations, shipping agents and others. In the following years, the organization steadily grew and launched some more collective action initiatives in Egypt, Indonesia, Ukraine and India. In 2022, the MACN set off its Global Port Integrity Platform (GPIP), which is its newest online data site, following its initial Anonymous Incident Reporting System. The data site still showcases incident data at the global level, but with GPIP, it also measures port integrity worldwide. As there is no international standard for measuring integrity in ports as of now, the MACN works closely with international organizations, civil society, academia and stakeholders in the shipping industry to develop criteria capturing the level of integrity. In about ten years, the MACN grew from zero members to more than 190 by 2022. As of 2024, MACN reported receiving 61,000 reports of corruption in over 1,000 ports across 150 countries via tips to its Anonymous Incident Reporting System.

The MACN's governance structure is made up of a member-elected steering committee; an annual member meeting; and a secretariat that is based in Copenhagen, Denmark. The secretariat is responsible for maintaining the incident reporting form, preparatory research and coordination of activities, communication and collective action in specific regions. For members, MACN is not only beneficial for all the information shared on incidents and e-learnings, but the sheer display of the MACN logo is already a powerful mechanism to signal their anti-corruption commitments in the maritime industry.

The MACN is a self-described global business network with the mission of working towards the elimination of all forms of maritime corruption. This mission includes several goals, including raising awareness of corruption challenges; implementing anti-corruption principles; developing and sharing best practices; collaborating with governments, NGOs, and civil society to combat the root causes of corruption; and finally create a 'culture of integrity' within the entire maritime community.

MACN has established a strategy for achieving these goals that they have named "The Three Cs":

- Capacity Building
  - Focuses on monitoring threats, information sharing, and strengthening internal compliance management of its member companies
- Collective Action
  - Building sustainable collaborations with governments in order to strengthen accountability across the maritime sector and increase member participation
- Culture of Integrity
  - Collaborate with key stakeholders and engage in open dialogue to promote integrity culture and increase awareness of industry challenges

This strategy also addressed both the supply and demand side of bribery and corruption. The internal supply side of the strategy focuses on the improvement of member compliance and anti-corruption programs, the external demand side aims to tackle bribery and corruption by achieving a clearer operational environment. Thus, the MACN cooperates with stakeholders to reduce facilitation payments and demands for bribes.

This comprehensive strategy has been used for the development of several collective actions which have focused on the implementation of new standard operating procedures (SOPs), the creation of an anonymous incident reporting mechanism, and development of an integrity training toolkit. The collective action initiatives in question have taken place in Nigeria, Argentina, Egypt, Indonesia, India and Ukraine, and most recently in Bangladesh and Pakistan.

== Collective Action Initiatives ==
=== Nigeria ===
The collective action initiative between the MACN and the Convention on Business Integrity, an internationally recognized NGO which specializes in West African ethics and anti-corruption, was developed in 2011 to promote integrity and good governance in Nigeria's ports. It was developed with a multi-stakeholder approach in mind, where national port authorities, members of the maritime industry and customs officers would have an opportunity to affect the area in which they worked. The focus of this initiative was to implement face-to-face integrity training, harmonize regulations, and establish grievance mechanisms for each port to offer to captains. Nigeria is recognized as one of the most challenging countries to do business because of the major risk of facilitation requests and the possibility of extortion, harassment, and threats in the case of a company refusing to pay. The initial survey taken by the MACN showed that frequent demands were made by government agencies, primarily in major ports like Lagos Apapa and Lagos Tin Can. The project was set up in collaboration of the two previously mentioned organisations and several Nigerian anti-corruption agencies: Independent Corrupt Practices Commission (ICPC); Technical Unit on Governance and Anti-Corruption Reforms (TUGAR); Bureau for Public Procurement (BPP); and the Economic and Financial Crimes Commission.

2012 to 2014 marked the risk assessment and scoping stage of the initiative. This stage consisted of identifying forms of corruption, drivers and possible solutions. The risk assessment focused on the ports of Apapa and Tin Can in Lagos, Port Harcourt, Onne, Calabar, and Warri. This assessment highlighted several key risks throughout Nigeria:

- Weak internal ethics infrastructure
- Insufficiently defined SOPs for port calls
- Underdeveloped complaint investigation structures and enforcement practices
- A lack of coordination among government agencies
- Broad discretionary powers for authorities
- Indications of state capture and monopoly (In Onne and Warri specifically)

2015-2017 was the implementation stage. The outcomes of this stage included improved transparency of regulation, strengthened governance frameworks, and an increased stakeholder capacity for anti-corruption management. In 2017, an impact assessment was taken using both qualitative and quantitative data to evaluate changes in incident data as well as qualitative perceptions from industry players and government stakeholders. The implementation of the initiative had a quite positive national reception with a high level of support from the presidency. The government approval was shown through the Vice President's participation in a launch event of the Port Service Support Portal and Accountability Mechanism.

In June 2019, it was announced that the MACN was to strengthen port enforcement, embarking on a partnership with the Danish Ministry of Foreign Affairs (MOFA) to develop a Global Port Integrity Index and scale up its collective action activities in West Africa. The Global Port Integrity Index will be based on first-hand data gathered from MACN's anonymous incident reporting mechanism. The scaling up of West African collective action will include working further with international and local maritime organisations as well as Nigerian government authorities so that they can improve the overall maritime climate, reducing maritime corruption. As Denmark is a large player in the international maritime sector, MOFA will be involved in a global anti-corruption program extending support to all levels of public and private level stakeholders.

=== Argentina ===
In 2014, after analyzing data from its anonymous incident reporting mechanism, MACN recognized Argentina as a primary area for recurring reports of facilitation requests during the vessel clearing process. Although every cargo ship entering Argentine waters must pass inspections, including those by the Servicio Nacional Sanidad y Calidad Agroalimentaria (an Argentine agency that guarantees the quality and healthiness of agricultural products), several problematic incentives were identified for undermining integrity:

- Inspections were at the discretion of inspectors;
- Failing an inspection is costly for both parties;
- Recording inspections with paper records makes data aggregation extremely difficult;
- Systems lack reliable reporting mechanisms for companies seeking to counter alleged non-compliance

Therefore, the focus of this initiative was to redraft regulations of a vessel's holds for the loading of agricultural products and develop a new IT system for processing and registering holds/inspections. For this project, MACN has teamed up with its local partner, Governance Latam, a Buenos Aires law firm specializing in compliance and anti-corruption. Part of the strategy for this initiative was interviewing over 40 MACN members, port agents, private surveyors, public inspectors, maritime lawyers, maritime insurance officials, representatives of grain houses, and public officials to get a baseline risk assessment. This broad range of actors was used to ensure a balance between the commercial interests of private stakeholders and the foreign policy interests of Argentina's public domain. As in the Nigeria initiative, the objective of this was to modernize inspection systems to be less discretionary and more transparent.

This initiative so far has been a success in implementing a new regulatory framework that:

- Reduces discretion in the inspection of holds and tanks;
- Establishes a system of cross-checks to increase integrity;
- Provides an escalation process when disputes occur;
- Creates an e-governance system to underpin the framework

Since the implementation of the new regulatory framework, an influx of funding has enabled Governance Latam to carry out training to hundreds of local, private, and public stakeholders, with SENASA establishing the course as official government training material through its Resolution No.693-E/2017.

=== Egypt ===
In 2015, MACN developed an initiative in Egypt aimed at combating challenges in Suez Canal transits. The primary focus of this initiative is to encourage captains passing through the Suez Canal to refuse bribery demands. So far, the impacts of this initiative have been a decrease in the frequency of demands, higher number of refusals of demands by captains, and a small development of MACN toolkit use across Africa Operations. MACN has not published any in-depth impact reports on their work in Egypt yet, but "Collective Action in Egypt" was a topic on the agenda at the 2019 MACN Annual Member Meeting in London.

In September 2021, the MACN together with ELDIB, established its local HelpDesk in Egypt. The HelpDesk helps the organization to address general concerns of its members and to address an increase in incidents. By the end of 2021, the HelpDesk had 20 incident calls and was able to respond and resolve two incidents.

=== Indonesia ===
MACN initiated its collective action initiative in Indonesia in 2015 with a focus on improving tracker IT systems, promoting e-governance systems for cashless export licenses, integrating whistle-blowing procedures, and establishing a forum for discussing and raising awareness about anti-corruption laws and regulations. The project was implemented with support from the Indonesian NGO Kemitraan and the U.K. Foreign Commonwealth Office, co-financed by the UKFCO and MACN. The initial risk assessment gathered that there is a high risk of corruption in ports, with frequent occurrence of illicit facilitation payments. Companies that refuse these payments are typically penalized in some way, whether with delays or non-compliance fees. A key challenge to the initiative was the ambiguous laws and regulations. President Joko Widodo sought to improve performance by improving these regulations and making investments into infrastructure.

Indonesia's ambition to invest and build a more competitive maritime sector by tackling corruption attracted several stakeholders from both the private and public sector. The key stakeholders involved include:

- DG Customs & Excise
- PT Pelindo II
- Corruption Eradication Commission
- UKFCO
- Kemitraan and Civil Society
- MACN member companies

The UKFCO has served as the primary public actor aside from the Indonesian government. Their involvement is motivated by the British agenda to combat corruption through private sector engagement, as evidenced by both the 2010 U.K. Bribery Act and 2014 U.K. Anti-Corruption Plan. Therefore, a main objective of the initiative is to increase the ease of doing business for British, international and local businesses which operate in Indonesia. Additional objectives include increasing transparency of port operations and the removal of trade barriers.

The prevalence of corrupt officials in Tanjung Priok Port, the main port in Jakarta, creates an immediate objective to implement transparent regulations and address integrity risks. The key transparency risks identified by the initiative are the lack of transparent SOPs in Tanjung Priok as well as the tendency for the vessel departure process to rely on cash payments without any receipts, which make corruption and exploitation virtually impossible to detect unless reported. In addition, the whistleblowing systems developed by DG customs and IPC Pelindo II are not used by members of Indonesia's industry, and the systems that are used are quite deficient.

Therefore, the key actors of the initiative identified several high level actions to be taken in either a short or long term timeframe:

- Short Term:
  - PT Pelindo II - establish improved and transparent tracking IT systems
  - All Stakeholders - establish a stakeholder forum for government agencies and members of the maritime industry to discuss integrity challenges
  - DG Customs - raise awareness about SOPs and regulations
- Long Term
  - All Stakeholders - integrate whistle-blowing reporting into existing processes and procedures
  - DG Customs & MACN - support the establishment of cashless systems for fees

Overall, this initiative has so far improved the transparency of importing and exporting regulations through Tanjung Priok port. In addition, the improved dialogue between the public and private sector has increased accountability and responsiveness of key Indonesian government stakeholders.

=== India ===
In 2019, it was announced that the Government of India would engage in a collective action with MACN, international organizations, and industry stakeholders. This initiative would include the implementation of integrity training for port officials and establishment of clear escalation and reporting procedures. The overall strategic goal is to reduce and eventually eliminate bottlenecks to trade and other integrity issues during port operations. The initiative was first successfully tested for six months in Mumbai ports. Since then. the Port Integrity Campaign has been made even stronger thanks to the commitment of the Indian Government and the recruitment of private sector companies and key business associations. In 2022 the Say No Campaign was also launched in the port of Chennai. Also that year, a HelpDesk was established in partnership with the Indian National Shipowners Association and the UN Global Compact Networks, making India the fourth country to implement it.

=== Ukraine ===
In 2019, the MACN started to analyze corruption at Ukrainian ports and found it to be systematically present and maintained by a network of individuals through several government agencies. Shipping companies were also seen facing challenges in connection to documentation and onboarding practices (like waste disposal and ballast water discharge). Therefore, risk assessment was continued by the MACN throughout 2019 and led to further developments in the collective action initiative in 2020. Also, that year a local HelpDesk was established in Ukraine with a new partner, ANK Law Office, followed by the publication of a set of guidelines to control vessels’ ballast by ecologists. In 2021, the MACN started to increasingly engage with national authorities to strengthen ports’ integrity.

=== Most recent projects – Bangladesh and Pakistan ===
In 2021 the MACN established a new collective action initiative in Bangladesh and conducted an initial corruption risks assessment. The organization also established a new Code of Conduct to help build alliances with relevant stakeholders in the area.

Also that year, the MACN working together with the UN Global Compact Pakistan, participated in bilateral meetings with national stakeholders in Pakistan to increase in-country engagement.

== Maritime anti-corruption measures and suggestions ==
As maritime corruption can increase security risks and facilitate other crimes, such as human trafficking or labor abuses, getting as many actors involved in corruption tackling and prevention as possible is essential. The MACN strongly believes in the power of collective action and thus offers some initial suggestions on how to generally approach systemic challenges caused by corruption:

- Stakeholders need to have a lot to win and a lot to lose – this is to ensure that all actors with different goals would perceive the measurable problems corruption can cause and the level of improvement putting an end to it can mean.
- Always have smaller, manageable goals set out – systemic change can be made gradually by addressing individual cases of corruption first rather than trying to solve all maritime corruption on a global scale.
- Political involvement is essential – actual change can only be achieved if the local government is ready to listen and act on the port corruption problem.
- Data is a driver for change – by relying on the data collected by its incident reporting system, the MACN can give true authority to proposals for action.
- Long-term commitment – Although smaller goals lead to more effective results, actors getting involved in the fight against maritime corruption should commit themselves to the goal in the long-term in order to create trust and transparency for future collaboration.

Deloitte also points out a few measures specifically for companies to follow that can help mitigate risks associated with corruption and bribery:

- Comprehensive anti-bribery and corruption compliance program implementation,
- Periodical review and update of related policies and procedures, which should be designed clearly and practically,
- Adaptation of a zero-tolerance culture,
- Conduction of anti-bribery training for all employees, management, business partners and third parties,
- Conduction of risk evaluation of business partners and vendors,
- Establishment of a confidential whistleblowing system for employees and third parties to raise concerns without the fear of retaliation.

As the shipping industry and ports are at the forefront of maritime corruption, there are some direct suggestions and technological measures for these areas. These include:

- Online processing of documentation clearance,
- Development and clarification of standard operating procedures (SOPs) of port stakeholders,
- Establishment of port-level complaint mechanisms,
- Automation of customs administration,
- Rotation of inspectors at ports and terminals to hinder collusion,
- Adjustment of salary packages of dock and port workers and customs and border agents based on ethics incentives,
- Blockchain technology for e.g., tracking trade flow of agricultural goods between two ports,
- Remote Container Management (RCM), a technology for monitoring the condition (location, equipment status pressure, etc.) of the containers on a given vessel.

As for achieving a more overarching societal change, the following solutions have been proposed by academics in the field:

- international organizations, like the UN and IMO, need to participate more in getting more actors involved in maritime anti-corruption. Suggested actions to be taken include:
  - UN should require governments to construct anti-corruption measures as a prerequisite to funding,
  - both UN and IMO to hold multi-stakeholder forums, including captains and seafarers in the maritime anti-corruption policy discussions,
  - IMO to raise transparency at ports by clearly articulating the role of port officials and procedures for entry,
  - IMO to educate captains and seafarers about corruption at sea, boost captains’ confidence to negotiate and provide anti-corruption training to seafarers so that they are aware of the best practices, resources and tools they can use at sea.
- to further improve transparency, updating existing legislation is recommended (e.g. FCPA) to be more in line with other international anti-corruption laws,
- create new legislation requiring court-ordered reparations into protected administrative programs to direct money collected from anti-corruption law violations back to the most impacted regions.

== See also ==
- ISO 37001 Anti-bribery management systems
- Group of States Against Corruption
- International Anti-Corruption Academy
- United Nations Convention against Corruption
- OECD Anti-Bribery Convention
