= Regional Anti-Corruption Initiative =

Intergovernmental regional organization

Regional Anti-Corruption Initiative (RAI)
- Founded: 2000
- Type: intergovernmental organization
- Purpose: regional cooperation to support anti-corruption efforts
- Region served: Albania, Bosnia and Herzegovina, Bulgaria, Croatia, Moldova, Montenegro, North Macedonia, Romania and Serbia
- Members: 9
- Key people: Laura Ștefan (Chairperson), Desislava Gotskova (Head of Secretariat)
- Website: rai-see.org

The Regional Anti-Corruption Initiative (RAI, previously known as Stability Pact Anti-Corruption Initiative – SPAI) is an intergovernmental organization for cooperation supporting anti-corruption efforts of its nine South Eastern European member states: Albania, Bosnia and Herzegovina, Bulgaria, Croatia, Moldova, Montenegro, North Macedonia, Romania and Serbia. It was established in Sarajevo in February 2000. In 2007, all the 9 member states signed the Memorandum of Understanding Concerning Cooperation in Fighting Corruption Through the South Eastern European Anti-Corruption Initiative amended in 2013 with a protocol for the adoption of the new name of the initiative.

RAI's Secretariat is based in Sarajevo, Bosnia and Herzegovina, and is led by Desislava Gotskova who previously worked in EUROPOL and the Bulgarian Ministry of Justice. The former Director in the Romanian Ministry of Justice Laura Ștefan serves as the Chairperson (as of 2023) of the organization. As of 2023, three countries have observer status and participate as such in the RAI's Steering Group: Poland, Georgie and Slovenia.

== Mission and Aims ==
RAI's mission is to provide a common platform for discussions among governments and civil society through sharing knowledge and best practices in fighting corruption. Its overall objective is to support states in the implementation of evidence-based anti-corruption reforms and enforcing anti-corruption legislation in targeted fields and selected sectors according to the international standards established by the UN Convention against Corruption (UNCAC), Council of Europe Criminal Law Convention on Corruption, as well as other relevant instruments and best practices.

The organization's primary strategic objectives according to its Work Plan for 2023 – 2025 are:

- Amplifying regional cooperation in asset disclosure and conflict of interest aimed in having all the Western Balkan countries signed the International Treaty on Exchange of data from Asset Declarations
- Strengthening capacities and resilience of public institutions and public policies targeting corruption proofing of legislation (CPL) opportunities in the areas most affected by corruption, thus strengthening the implementation of the mechanisms for detection and minimization of the risk of future corruption in the legislation drafting
- Enhancing the culture of integrity in the institutions and the general public targeting audiences like the youth, the public sector, CSOs, business organizations and the general public, to promote anti-corruption public attitudes and efforts through the enhancement of whistleblowing enforcement and whistleblower protection
- Enhancing regional cooperation and strengthening the capacity of key national institutions to develop and implement good practices in asset recovery in line with international and European standards
- Contributing to stability and peace through building integrity and curbing corruption in the security sector through internal oversight units and increasing their capacity to implement the Group of States against Corruption (GRECO) recommendations for the prevention of corruption

Gender mainstreaming the programmes and due diligence, awareness raising with the general public and youth and digitization of anti-corruption as a global trend are outlined as the crosscutting issues on which the organization's policies and activities are focused.

== Projects ==
Between December 2015 and August 2020 RAI and United Nations Office on Drugs and Crime (UNODC) partnered in a joint Southeast Europe (SEE) Regional Programme on Strengthening the Capacity of Anti-corruption Authorities and Civil Society to Combat Corruption and Contribute to the UNCAC Review Process. Between 2020 and 2023 RAI is implementing the project Breaking the Silence: Enhancing whistleblowing policies and culture in Western Balkans and Moldova funded by the European Union through the multi-country programme of its Instrument for Pre-accession Assistance (IPA).
