= Corruption in Luxembourg =

Levels of corruption in Luxembourg are generally said to be very low, and there is a strong legal framework for combating corruption in the country. Surveys however, indicate that a majority of the population believes political parties are either "corrupt" or "extremely corrupt."

Political corruption does surface. According to Transparency International Global Corruption Barometer 2013, 53% of the surveyed households considered political parties "corrupt" or "extremely corrupt", and 33% had the same opinion about Parliament. Moreover, a significant number of the surveyed households considered that the government's fight against corruption was "ineffective" and that corruption had increased over the previous two years. On Transparency International's 2025 Corruption Perceptions Index, Luxembourg scored 78 on a scale from 0 ("highly corrupt") to 100 ("very clean"). When ranked by score, Luxembourg ranked 8th among the 182 countries in the Index, where the country ranked first is perceived to have the most honest public sector. For comparison with regional scores, the best score among Western European and European Union countries (Note: Austria, Belgium, Bulgaria, Croatia, Cyprus, Czechia, Denmark, Estonia, Finland, France, Germany, Greece, Hungary, Iceland, Ireland, Italy, Latvia, Lithuania, Luxembourg, Malta, Netherlands, Norway, Poland, Portugal, Romania, Slovakia, Slovenia, Spain, Sweden, Switzerland, and the United Kingdom.) was 89, the average score was 64 and the worst score was 40. For comparison with worldwide scores, the best score was 89 (ranked 1), the average score was 42, and the worst score was 9 (ranked 181, in a two-way tie).

Several other sources indicate that the overlap between business and politics in Luxembourg gives opportunities for corruption, and there is no code of conduct focusing on corruption, conflict of interest and favouritism for procurement officials.
