= Corruption in the Federated States of Micronesia =

Corruption in the Federated States of Micronesia describes the prevention and occurrence of corruption in the Federated States of Micronesia (FSM). The FSM has faced challenges in maintaining transparency and accountability in its political and administrative systems. These create opportunities for corruption and is further exacerbated by weak enforcement of anti-corruption measures, limited resources, and a lack of public awareness about corruption's impact on development.

According to the Global Corruption Barometer study by Transparency International, 80% of Micronesians perceive corruption in the government as a grave concern. Additionally, 58% of respondents disclosed that they had been offered bribes in exchange for their votes within the past five years, underscoring the prevalence of electoral malpractice and ethical challenges in governance. The findings in this study are reflected in several cases of corruption involving public officials.

== Notable corruption scandals ==
In 2007, Jesse B. Marehalau, a former ambassador to the United States, was implicated in a passport fraud scheme. It exploited a unique agreement between FSM and the United States, which allows Micronesian passport holders to live and work in the U.S. This case highlighted the systemic vulnerabilities in FSM’s oversight mechanisms.

The subsequent year witnessed the removal of a senator from office following charges of embezzlement. The Micronesian constitution prohibits convicted felons from holding congressional seats. Investigations revealed the senator's alleged diversion of public infrastructure funds for personal enrichment, including the acquisition of luxury goods and other unaccounted expenditures. The inquiries further uncovered the senator's exploitation of vulnerabilities within the financial reporting system, effectively obscuring the trail of misappropriated funds.

Corruption involving funds from the Compact of Free Association with the United States is also a source of concern. This agreement provides the FSM with U.S. economic and defense assistance in exchange for U.S. military bases in its territory. The Compact funds represent one-third of the FSM's national income. Members of the Congress control the funding of infrastructure projects in their states and municipalities, which present opportunities for corruption and enrichment. This was demonstrated in the case of three powerful representatives, who faced investigations and subsequent criminal charges in the mid-2000s for corruption. They were convicted but later pardoned.

== Anti-corruption initiatives ==
Agencies tasked with addressing corruption include the Department of Justice, the National Police, including its Financial Intelligence Unit and the Transnational Crime Unit, and the National Public Auditor. There have been instances where the government attempted to hold corrupt officials accountable; however, these efforts often proved ineffective, as evidenced by the persistent impunity surrounding corruption cases. The absence of comprehensive transparency laws exacerbates the issue, enabling corrupt practices to become increasingly pervasive and largely unaddressed by the justice system.
