= Corruption in Iceland =

Corruption in Iceland describes the prevention and occurrence of corruption in Iceland.

== Extent ==
According to several sources, corruption is not common on a daily basis in Iceland. However, the 2008 financial crisis and subsequent revelations have had a negative impact on the integrity and independence of Iceland's governing institutions.

Transparency International's 2025 Corruption Perceptions Index scored Iceland at 77 on a scale from 0 ("highly corrupt") to 100 ("very clean"). When ranked by score, Iceland ranked 10th among the 182 countries in the Index, where the country ranked first is perceived to have the most honest public sector. For comparison with regional scores, the best score among Western European and European Union countries (Note: Austria, Belgium, Bulgaria, Croatia, Cyprus, Czechia, Denmark, Estonia, Finland, France, Germany, Greece, Hungary, Iceland, Ireland, Italy, Latvia, Lithuania, Luxembourg, Malta, Netherlands, Norway, Poland, Portugal, Romania, Slovakia, Slovenia, Spain, Sweden, Switzerland, and the United Kingdom.) was 89, the average score was 64 and the worst score was 40. For comparison with worldwide scores, the best score was 89 (ranked 1), the average score was 42, and the worst score was 9 (ranked 181, in a two-way tie).

According to GRECO's evaluation report 2013, the Icelandic political system was weakened by potential nepotism, close personal relationships between public officials and businesses, and political patronage at the local level.
