= Corruption in Togo =

Despite efforts to promote economic development and improve governance, Corruption in Togo remains a significant problem. The issue permeates various sectors, hindering the Togo's progress and eroding public trust. Reports from organizations like Transparency International consistently rank the country relatively low on corruption perception indices, which underscores the severity of the ongoing challenges to anti-corruption reform.

== Nepotism and corruption ==
Togo’s political landscape, shaped by a long period of single-family rule, has fostered a culture where patronage and nepotism permeate instead of meritocracy. The country has been dominated by Gnassingbé family rule for over five decades, beginning with Gnassingbé Eyadéma's presidency in 1967 and continuing under his son, Faure Gnassingbé, since 2005. Eyadéma’s two sons had served as commanders of important military garrisons in Togo and both have been implicated in abuses against opponents of their clan’s regime. The concentration of power has enshrined a culture of nepotism in state institutions where family members, relatives, and close allies are appointed in key government positions.

The nepotistic system has facilitated widespread corruption, as those in power prioritize personal enrichment over public service. The extent and severity of this problem are evident in the recent scandal involving the questionable disbursement of COVID-19 funds. Togo’s Court of Auditors found that the prime minister, the ministers of digital economy, health, communication, grassroots development, education, and commerce, in addition to the National Coordination Committee for the Management of the COVID-19 response, were all implicated in the irregularities involving a $21.8 million fund.

The single-family rule has also created a system of patronage, where lucrative government contracts are routinely awarded to companies that have close ties to the ruling family. This stifles growth because legitimate businesses are sidelined and investments are discouraged. A prominent example is the Bolloré Group case, in which the company's owner and top executives were indicted for allegedly financing the re-election campaign of Faure Gnassingbé. In return for its political support, the company was controversially awarded the contract to manage the ports of Lomé. The system has also put strain on the judiciary and law enforcement agencies, undermining their ability to operate independently. Corruption cases forwarded to the Attorney General often lack effective prosecution and are typically followed up with little to no action, reflecting systemic weaknesses in accountability.

Another aspect of the dynastic rule of the Gnassingbé family, as is the case in other autocratic regimes, is the high level of insecurity and uncertainty regarding their longevity. Aside from installing clansmen and allies to key positions of state, the succession of rulers overcomes active opposition through a strategy of brutal violence. As a result, there is a lack of scrutiny as well as checks and balances, which allows corruption to flourish.

== Weak judiciary ==
Nepotism and patronage are further exacerbated by a weak judiciary, which is notably susceptible to external pressures, particularly the presidency. This is seen in the case of lengthy pretrial detention of political opponents as well as the impunity for political friends. Magistrates do not only bow to external influence but there are also reports of bribery and favoritism as wealthy individuals with political connections tend to be given preferential treatment in legal proceedings. A report released by the High Authority for the Prevention and Fight Against Corruption and Similar Offences (HAPLUCIA) found that the components of society perceived to be most susceptible to corruption are judicial officers.

The extent of corruption in the public sector can be demonstrated in a 2015 survey that revealed how 26% of the people of Togo paid a bribe in exchange for access to public service. Similarly, conducting business in the country often necessitates bribing government officials to ensure progress.

== Anti-corruption framework ==
There are laws that criminalize corruption in Togo and these include legislations that aim to prevent, detect, and sanction corrupt practices. The country also ratified the United Nations Convention Against Corruption (UNCAC) in 2005 and the African Union Anti-Corruption Convention four years later. In 2015, the Criminal Code was passed and it included preventive anti-corruption measures as well as the implementation of the Access to Information Law, which was incorporated in 2016. This was augmented by the passage of legislation mandating asset declaration among public officials.

Despite the slew of anti-corruption initiatives, however, Togo’s corruption problem continues to persist. This has been attributed to weak enforcement due to the influence of the political elite. While Togolese officials have been prosecuted and convicted of corruption, these cases are rare and tend to involve those who have lost official favor.

== International rankings ==
In Transparency International's 2025 Corruption Perceptions Index, Togo scored 32 on a scale from 0 ("highly corrupt") to 100 ("very clean"). When ranked by score, Togo ranked 120th among the 182 countries in the Index, where the country ranked first is perceived to have the most honest public sector. For comparison with regional scores, the best score among sub-Saharan African countries (Note: Angola, Benin, Botswana, Burkina Faso, Burundi, Cameroon, Cape Verde, Central African Republic, Chad, Comoros, Côte d'Ivoire, Democratic Republic of the Congo, Djibouti, Equatorial Guinea, Eritrea, Eswatini, Ethiopia, Gabon, Gambia, Ghana, Guinea, Guinea-Bissau, Kenya, Lesotho, Liberia, Madagascar, Malawi, Mali, Mauritania, Mauritius, Mozambique, Namibia, Niger, Nigeria, Republic of the Congo, Rwanda, Sao Tome and Principe, Senegal, Seychelles, Sierra Leone, Somalia, South Africa, South Sudan, Sudan, Tanzania, Togo, Uganda, Zambia, and Zimbabwe.) was 68, the average was 32 and the worst was 9. For comparison with worldwide scores, the best score was 89 (ranked 1), the average was 42, and the worst was 9 (ranked 181, in a two-way tie).
