= Corruption in Tuvalu =

While not as widely reported as in larger nations, corruption in Tuvalu remains a concern. It affects governance, financial management, and public sector accountability. With its small population and limited economic resources, Tuvalu faces challenges in maintaining transparency in government operations. Reports indicate that weaknesses in anti-corruption mechanisms have led to instances of financial mismanagement and abuse of office.

== Notable cases ==
Transparency International has highlighted weaknesses in Tuvalu's National Integrity System, noting that public procurement lacks robust monitoring and accountability measures. Its procurement system has been susceptible to corruption due to the lack of oversight. One notable case of irregularity in public procurement involved the Central Procurement Unit, which is responsible for ensuring fair bidding processes. The agency has been criticized for lacking transparency, leading to suspicions of favoritism and misallocation of funds. During the COVID-19 pandemic, this vulnerability was particularly highlighted as emergency provisions, often adopted across Pacific Island countries, frequently bypassed typical legislative checks and balances, thereby creating expanded opportunities for corruption and malfeasance.

Visits to Taiwan are also identified as a form of corrupt practice among senior officials, who receive allowances for foreign trips, contributing to the so-called “per diem” mentality. Taiwan also pays generous amounts of money to these visitors. It was reported that a former politician was able to secure a huge amount of loan from a bank using per diems received as one of his guarantees.

Another significant issue has been the mismanagement of foreign aid, which plays a crucial role in Tuvalu's economy. A UNODC report in 2017 suggests that funds from international donors have been misused or redirected for purposes beyond their intended scope. The lack of stringent monitoring mechanisms has allowed government officials to allocate resources without adequate accountability, undermining development efforts.

== Anti-corruption initiatives ==
There are several institutions that address the corruption problem in Tuvalu. These include the Attorney General, the police force, the Ombudsman, the Auditor-General, the Public Service Commission, and the Central Procurement Unit.

Efforts to combat corruption in Tuvalu have included legislative measures, such as the implementation of the United Nations Convention against Corruption (UNCAC), which the country acceded to in 2015. However, enforcement remains a challenge due to limited resources and institutional weaknesses. Tuvalu also does not have a national anti-corruption strategy. It merely relies on preventive measures found in national legislations that address corruption and promote integrity. A report by the United Nations Convention Against Corruption noted that the absence of data, statistics, and comprehensive case examples makes it difficult to determine the efficacy of the country's anti-corruption framework.
