= Thomas Stelzer =

Thomas Stelzer may refer to:

- Thomas Stelzer (diplomat) (born 1955), Austrian diplomat
- Thomas Stelzer (politician) (born 1967), governor of Upper Austria
