= Thomas Stelzer (diplomat) =

Austrian diplomat

His Excellency Thomas Stelzer
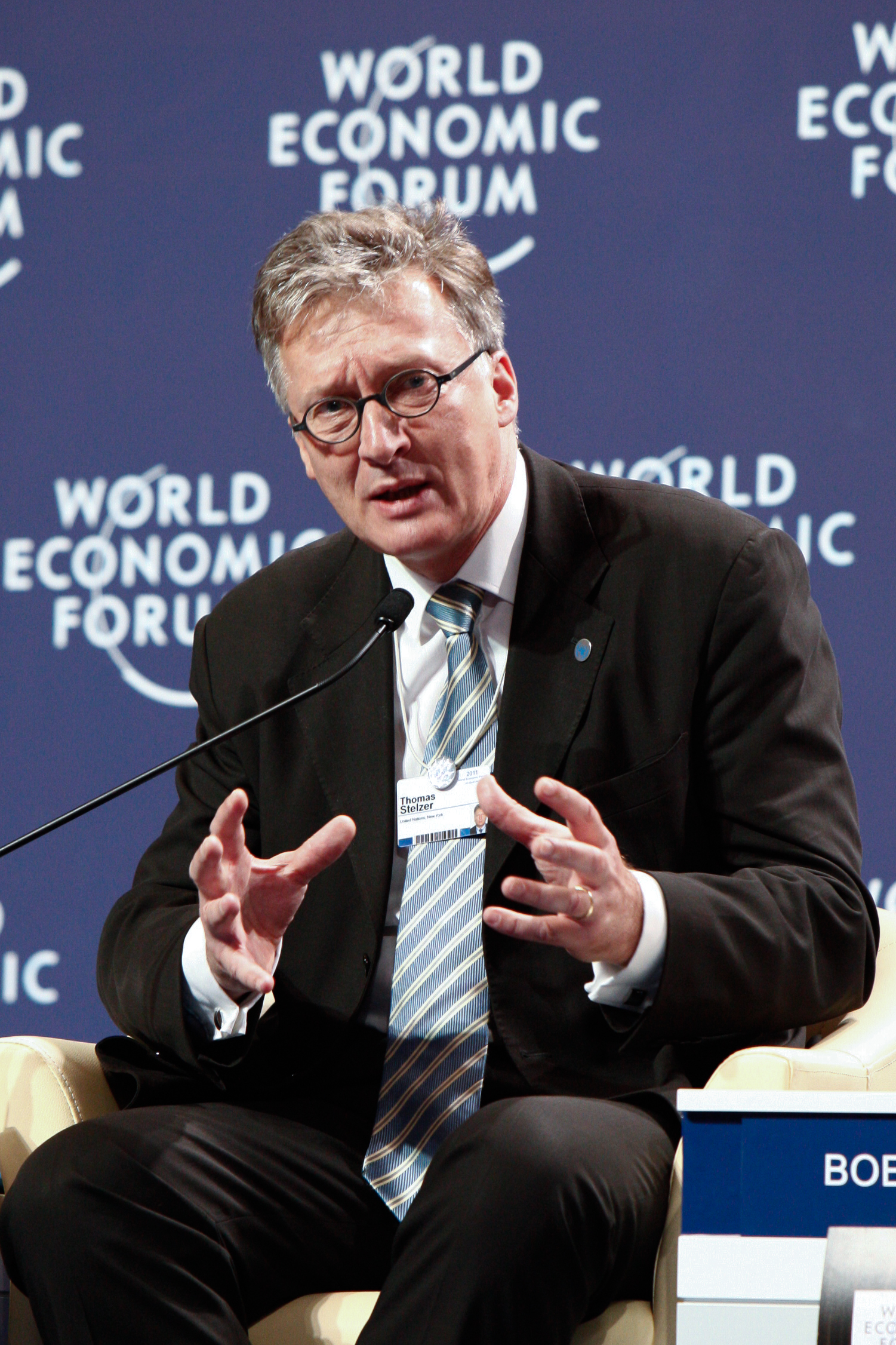

Austrian Ambassador to Portugal
- In office August 2013 – 2017
- President: Heinz Fischer (2018-2016); Alexander Van der Bellen (2017-present)
- Preceded by: Bernhard Wrabetz
- Succeeded by: Christoph Meran

Austrian Ambassador to Cape Verde
- In office August 2013 – 2017
- Preceded by: Bernhard Wrabetz
- Succeeded by: Christoph Meran

Permanent Representative of Austria to the United Nations in Vienna
- In office 24 July 2001 – 1 July 2008
- Preceded by: Ferdinand Mayrhofer-Grünbühel
- Succeeded by: Helmut Böck

UN Assistant Secretary-General for Policy Coordination and Inter-Agency Affairs
- In office 8 February 2008 – 30 June 2013
- UN Secretary-General: Ban Ki-moon
- Preceded by: Patrizio Civili
- Succeeded by: Thomas Gass

Personal details
- Spouse: Vanda Stelzer Sequeira
- Children: 5
- Education: Vienna University; Stanford University; Johns Hopkins University

Thomas Stelzer (born June 19, 1955) is an Austrian diplomat, who served as the Dean and Executive Secretary of the International Anti-Corruption Academy (IACA) until March 2024.

== Education ==
Stelzer holds a doctorate in law from Vienna University, a master of arts in Latin American studies from Stanford University, and a diploma in international relations from the Johns Hopkins University, School of Advanced International Studies, Bologna Center.

== Diplomatic career ==
Stelzer served in a variety of diplomatic and international positions.

Minister-Counsellor at the Permanent Mission of Austria to the United Nations in New York; Delegate to the Committee for Disarmament and International Security (First Committee) of the General Assembly;Austrian Representative to the governing bodies of the United Nations Development Programme (UNDP), the United Nations Children’s Fund (UNICEF) and the United Nations Population Fund (UNFPA);

Deputy Director of the Austrian Cultural Institute in New York;

Special Assistant to the Executive Secretary of the CTBTO (Comprehensive Nuclear Test-Ban Treaty) Preparatory Commission;

Permanent Representative of Austria to the United Nations (Vienna), United Nations Industrial Development Organization (UNIDO), International Atomic Energy Agency (IAEA), and the Comprehensive Nuclear-Test-Ban Treaty Organization (CTBTO) Preparatory Commission;

Facilitator and Chair of the Vienna Terrorism Symposiums;

Negotiator of the United Nations Convention against Corruption UNCAC;

Chair of the CTBTO Preparatory Commission;

President of the UNIDO Industrial Development Board.

Vice-Chair of the Second Conference of States Parties of the United Nations Convention against Corruption;

From March 2008 to June 2013 he served as United Nations Assistant Secretary-General for Policy Coordination and Inter-Agency Affairs, Department of Economic and Social Affairs. He was appointed to this position by UN Secretary-General Ban Ki-moon in February 2008.

Ambassador to Portugal and Cabo Verde;

Dean and Executive Secretary of the International Anti-Corruption Academy IACA

== Family life ==
Stelzer is married to Portuguese fellow diplomat Vanda Stelzer Sequeira, with whom he has three children.

== Decorations and awards ==
Stelzer has received the Decoration of Honour for Services to the Republic of Austria.
