= Global Corruption Barometer =

Survey tracking public opinion on corruption

The Global Corruption Barometer published by Transparency International is the largest survey in the world tracking public opinion on corruption. It surveys 114,000 people in 107 countries on their view of corruption.

== Have you paid a bribe in 2013? ==
People in 107 countries have been surveyed whether they have paid a bribe to a public body during the last year; but for a small number of these countries, Albania, Azerbaijan, Brazil, Burundi, Fiji, France, Germany, Lebanon, Luxembourg, Malawi, Russia and Zambia, response data on particular questions has been excluded because of concerns about validity and reliability. The margin of error for each country is 3%. The typical sample size is 1,000 people. Four countries – Cyprus, Luxembourg, Vanuatu and Solomon Islands – have a sample size of 500 people and a margin of error of 4%.

Unlike the other similar Corruption Perception Index published by Transparency International, this is a survey directly asking the population instead of using "perceived expert opinions", which is liable to substantial bias and has been under criticism as such. In a 2013 article in Foreign Policy, Alex Cobham argued that the CPI embeds a powerful and misleading elite bias in popular perceptions of corruption, potentially contributing to a vicious cycle and at the same time incentivizing inappropriate policy responses. Cobham resumes: "the index corrupts perceptions to the extent that it's hard to see a justification for its continuing publication".

Rank	Country/Territory	% of people who paid bribes
1	Australia	1
2	Denmark	1
3	Finland	1
4	Japan	1
5	Spain	2
6	Canada	3
7	South Korea	3
8	Malaysia	3
9	Maldives	3
10	New Zealand	3
11	Norway	3
12	Uruguay	3
13	Portugal	3
14	Belgium	4
15	Croatia	4
16	Georgia	4
17	Italy	5
18	United Kingdom	5
19	Estonia	6
20	Slovenia	6
21	Switzerland	7
22	United States	7
23	Bulgaria	8
24	Chile	10
25	El Salvador	12
26	Hungary	12
27	Israel	12
28	Palestine	12
29	Jamaica	12
30	Philippines	12
31	Argentina	13
32	Rwanda	13
33	Vanuatu	13
34	Czech Republic	15
35	Kosovo	16
36	North Macedonia	17
37	Romania	17
38	Sudan	17
39	Armenia	18
40	Thailand	18
41	Tunisia	18
42	Cyprus	19
43	Latvia	19
44	Sri Lanka	19
45	Peru	20
46	Slovakia	21
47	Turkey	21
48	Colombia	22
49	Greece	22
50	Paraguay	25
51	Lithuania	26
52	Serbia	26
53	Papua New Guinea	27
54	Venezuela	27
55	Bosnia and Herzegovina	28
56	Madagascar	28
57	Iraq	29
58	Moldova	29
59	Vietnam	30
60	Nepal	31
61	Mexico	33
62	Kazakhstan	34
63	Pakistan	34
64	Solomon Islands	34
65	Bolivia	36
66	Egypt	36
67	Indonesia	36
68	Taiwan	36
69	Ukraine	37
70	Jordan	37
71	Bangladesh	39
72	South Sudan	39
73	Algeria	41
74	Nigeria	44
75	Ethiopia	44
76	Mongolia	45
77	Kyrgyzstan	45
78	Afghanistan	46
79	DR Congo	46
80	South Africa	47
81	Morocco	49
82	India	54
83	Ghana	54
84	Tanzania	56
85	Cambodia	57
86	Senegal	57
87	Uganda	61
88	Cameroon	62
89	Libya	62
90	Zimbabwe	62
91	Mozambique	62
92	Kenya	70
93	Yemen	74
94	Liberia	75
95	Sierra Leone	84

== See also ==
- Transparency International
- Corruption Perceptions Index
- OECD Anti-Bribery Convention
- United Nations Convention against Corruption
