= International Anti-Corruption Day =

Annual event of the UN on 9 December

- Also called: IACD
- Observed by: UN Members
- Celebrations: United Nations
- Date: 9 December
- Next time: 9 December 2026
- Frequency: Annually

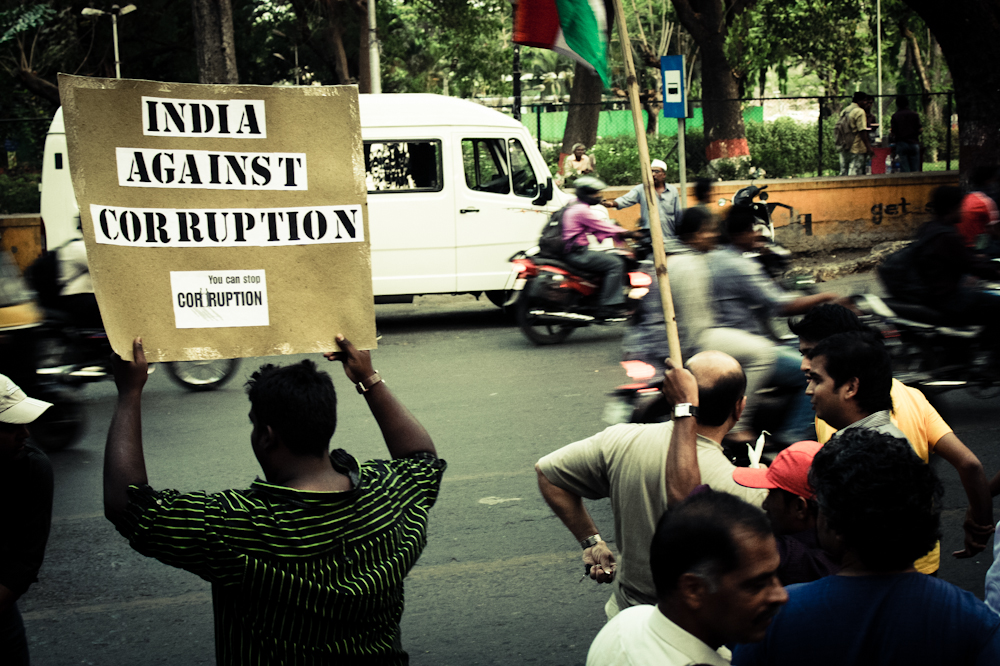
International Anti-Corruption Day

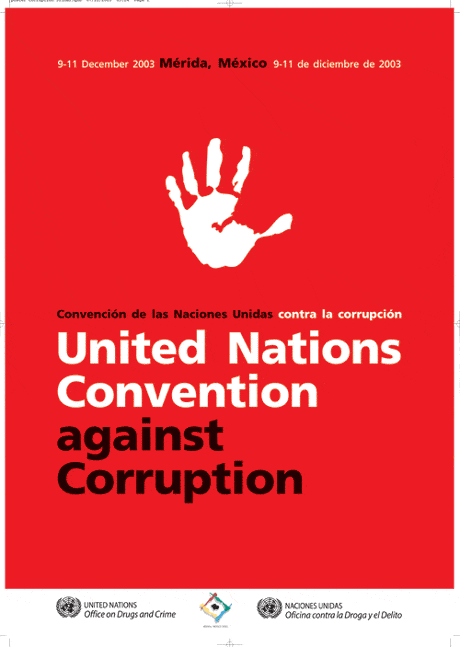
Chapter V of the United Nations Convention against Corruption (2003) makes clear that Asset Recovery is an international priority in the fight against corruption.

International Anti-Corruption Day has been observed annually on 9 December since the passage of the United Nations Convention Against Corruption on 31 October 2003 to raise public awareness for anti-corruption.

== Background ==
The Convention states, in part, that the UN is:

concerned about the seriousness of problems and threats posed by corruption to the stability and security of societies, undermining the institutions and values of democracy, ethical values and justice and jeopardizing sustainable development and the rule of law

and delegates to the convention the power to:

promote and strengthen measures to prevent and combat corruption more efficiently and effectively... promote, facilitate and support international cooperation and technical assistance in the prevention of and fight against corruption… [and] promote integrity, accountability and proper management of public affairs and public property…

== Your NO counts campaign ==
The "Your NO Counts" campaign is a joint internationally sponsored effort by American governments that aims for peace with the region as a whole and is designed as an effort campaign created by the United Nations Development Programme and the United Nations Office on Drugs and Crime to mark International Anti-Corruption Day (9 December) and raise awareness about corruption and how to fight it.

The 2009 joint international campaign focused on how corruption hinders efforts to achieve the internationally agreed upon Millennium Development Goals, undermines democracy and the rule of law, leads to human rights violations, distorts markets, erodes quality of life, and allows organized crime, terrorism, and other threats to human security.

== See also ==
- Global Witness
- Group of States Against Corruption
- International Anti-Corruption Academy
- ISO 37001 Anti-bribery management systems
- United Nations Convention against Corruption
- OECD Anti-Bribery Convention
- Transparency International
- List of anti-corruption agencies
