= International Anti-Corruption Academy =

Intergovernmental organization

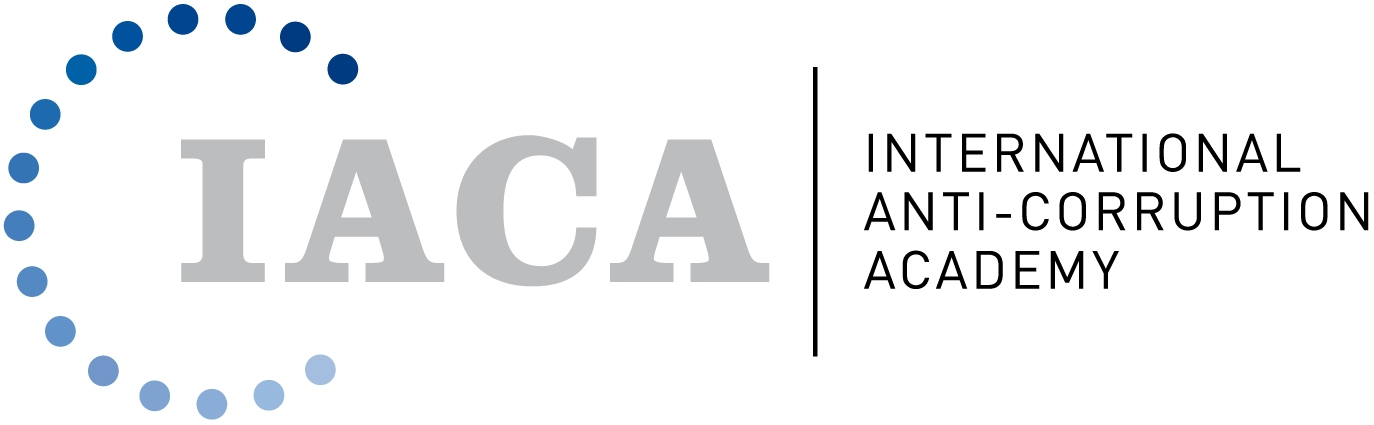

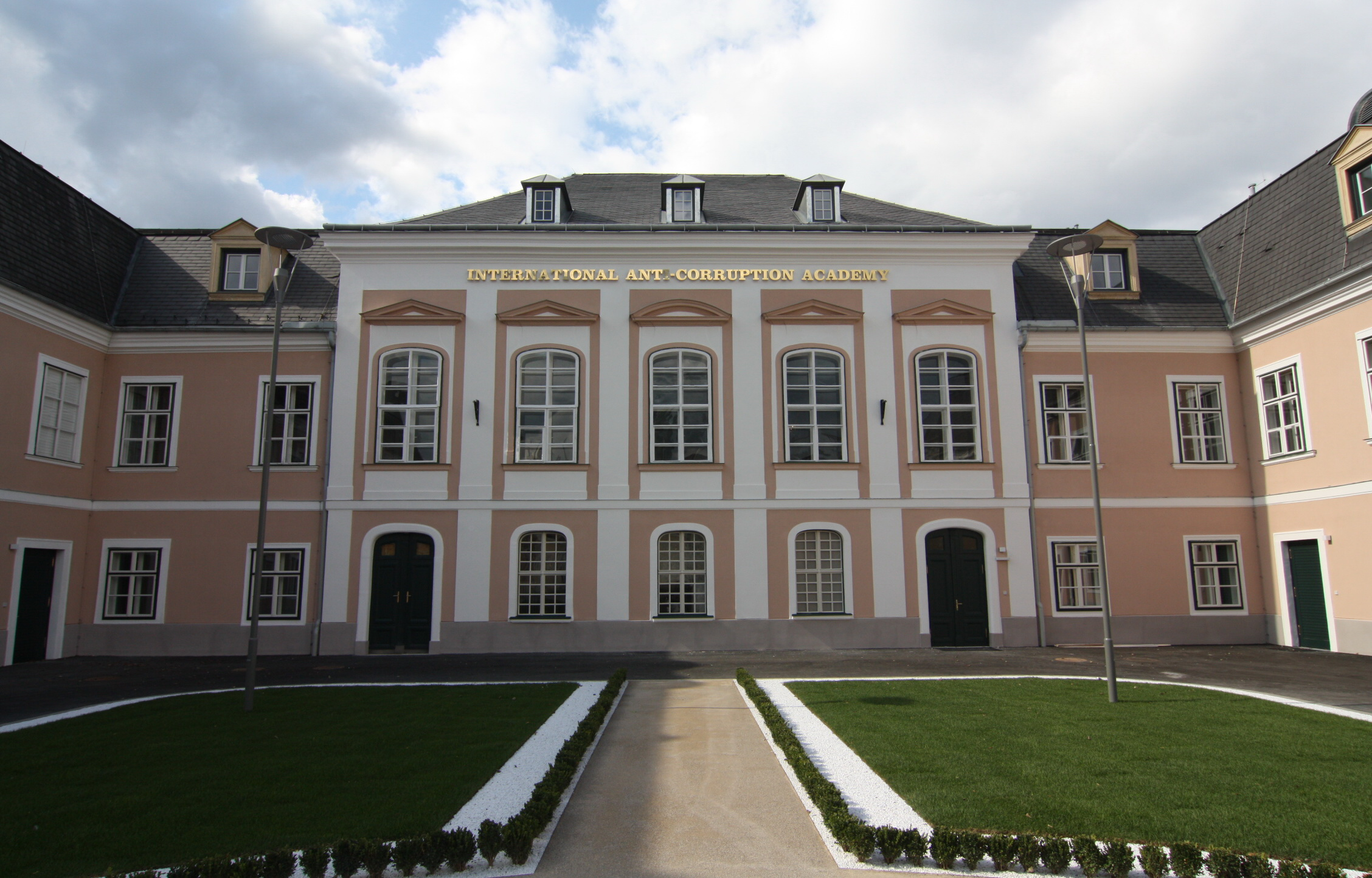
- Campus in Laxenburg
- Abbreviation: IACA
- Founded at: Vienna, Austria
- Headquarters: Laxenburg, Austria
- Members: 76 states 4 international organizations
- Dean and Executive Secretary: Dr. Slagjana Taseva
- Website: www.iaca.int

The International Anti-Corruption Academy (IACA) is an international intergovernmental organization based in Laxenburg, Austria, that teaches government officials and professionals about anti-corruption measures. Membership to the organization is open to UN-member states and intergovernmental organizations, without a mandatory membership fee.

== History ==
The process of creating an international organization focusing on anti-corruption education dates back to the year 2005, when an Interpol working group started to discuss such endeavor and was firstly raised publicly in 2006 at an Interpol General Assembly.

IACA was launched in 2010 by the United Nations Office on Drugs and Crime, Interpol, the European Anti-Fraud Office (OLAF), the Republic of Austria, and other stakeholders to help implement the UN Convention against Corruption. On March 8, 2011, IACA gained the status of an international organization. As of 2013, 61 countries had signed the IACA membership agreement, and 38 of those had ratified it. Since the accession of Kenya to the IACA in August 2020, the organisation has 80 members, including four intergovernmental organizations and 76 UN member states.

== International legal status ==
The International Anti-Corruption Academy was established as an international organisation through a multilateral agreement that entered into force on 8 March 2011. The agreement provides the Academy with international legal personality and establishes its institutional framework. It also allows states and intergovernmental organisations to become parties to the agreement, reflecting the Academy's role as a platform for international cooperation in anti-corruption education and research.

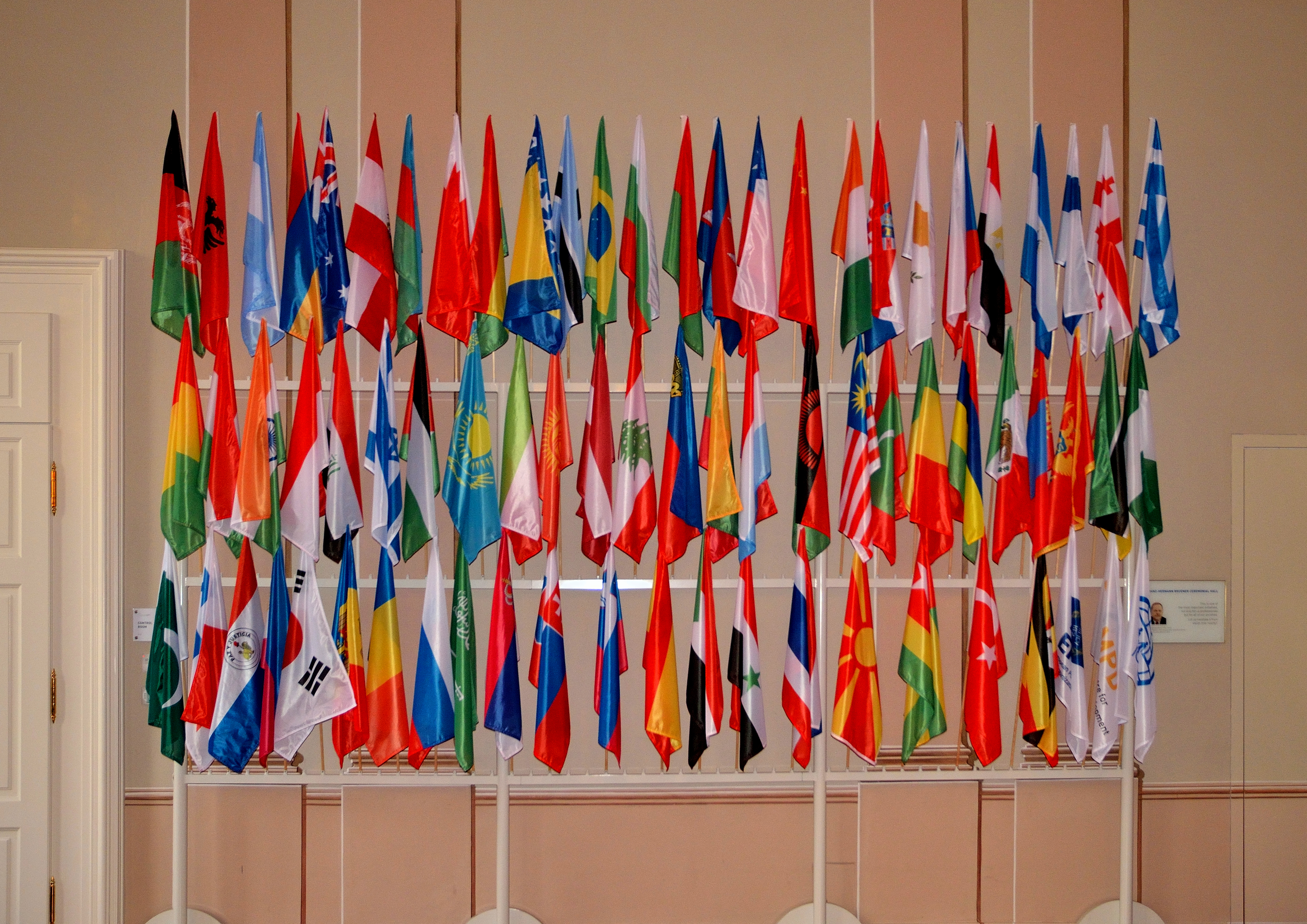
Display of flags of IACA's membership at its Laxenburg headquarters

== Organization ==
=== Educational program ===
IACA is recognized as an institution for postgraduate education by the Austrian ministry of Science, Research and Economy and is subsequently entitled to offer postgraduate education under the framework of the Bologna process. It started its first Masters program in February 2013; at that time the coursework was run in seven twelve-day blocks, taken over two years.

IACA offers four Masters programs, three of them are offered in English, while one program is conducted in Spanish. IACA's approach towards its Masters programs is described as holistic by the OSCE and the research portal of the French Ministry for the Economy and Finance. El Mundo reported that the studies are designed to be interdisciplinary and have a practical dimension. In 2018 there were approximately 1,600 alumni.

=== Finances ===
The Austrian news magazine News reported that IACA posted a budget of €12.98 million for the 2014 financial year and a budget of €13.24 million for 2015; while noting that the actual revenues for 2013 were €2.3 million and expenditures were around €2.1 million. IACA told the News that the higher numbers were based on their fundraising goals. At the end of 2015 and the beginning of 2016 IACA underwent a turnover in staff.

During IACA's seventh Assembly of Parties in September 2018, Eduardo Vetere, the chairman of IACA's Board of Governors, referred to an external auditor's report which concluded that IACA was in danger of insolvency. A working group was set up in December 2018 to restructure the income situation and generate membership contributions. The Austrian government made a contribution of €544,000 in December 2018.

=== Leadership ===
IACA is headed by its dean, who also serves as the executive secretary of the organization. Martin Kreutner served from IACA's creation in March 2011 to the end of January 2019 as IACA's first dean. The position remained vacant and was taken over by Christiane Pohn-Hufnagel, the organizations Chief of Staff and Head of General Services, in an acting capacity. In March 2020, Thomas Stelzer took office as the dean. Between July 2023 and July 2024 the position remained vacant and Jaroslaw Pietrusiewicz, Chief of Staff and Head of Strategic Partnerships, and Petra Susac, Head of General Management, acted as officers-in-charge of the organization. In July 2024, Dr. Slagjana Taseva took office as IACA's new dean and executive secretary. Her initial term is limited to four years and might be extended.

== Relationships with member countries ==
IACA's relations with Azerbaijan and the Russian Federation were criticized after IACA held its 2014 annual conference in Baku at the time of a governmental crackdown on non-governmental organizations (NGOs) and anti-corruption activists. According to Correctiv, one of the students at IACA was an Azerbaijani public prosecutor, who worked for the investigating authority that was prosecuting the Azerbaijani anti-corruption activist and journalist Khadija Ismayilova.

Another international controversy that was discussed within IACA occurred in 2012, when tensions arose as the representative of Syria stressed that, notwithstanding the election of the Israeli Mordechai Kremnitzer to IACA's board of governors, his government did not accept Israel's right of existence. The comment was rebuked by the Israeli ambassador in a fashion that was described as breaching the diplomatic protocol.

== Past and current lecturers ==
- Mushtaq Khan, economist at SOAS, University of London
- Robert Klitgaard, economist
- Johann Graf Lambsdorff, economist, creator of the Corruption Perception Index
- Ronald MacLean Abaroa, former politician
- Smokin Wanjala, judge at the Supreme Court of Kenya

== See also ==
- Asset forfeiture
- European Public Prosecutor
- Global Witness
- Group of States Against Corruption
- International Anti-Corruption Day
- ISO 37001 Anti-bribery management systems
- OECD Anti-Bribery Convention
- Transparency International
- United Nations Convention against Corruption
