= Group of States against Corruption =

Council of Europe's anti-corruption monitoring body

GRECO
- Group of States Against Corruption
- Formation: May 1, 1999; 27 years ago
- Type: Institutional
- Headquarters: Council of Europe, Strasbourg, France
- Members: 48 member states, 11 observers (2026)
- President: David Meyer
- Website: http://www.coe.int/greco

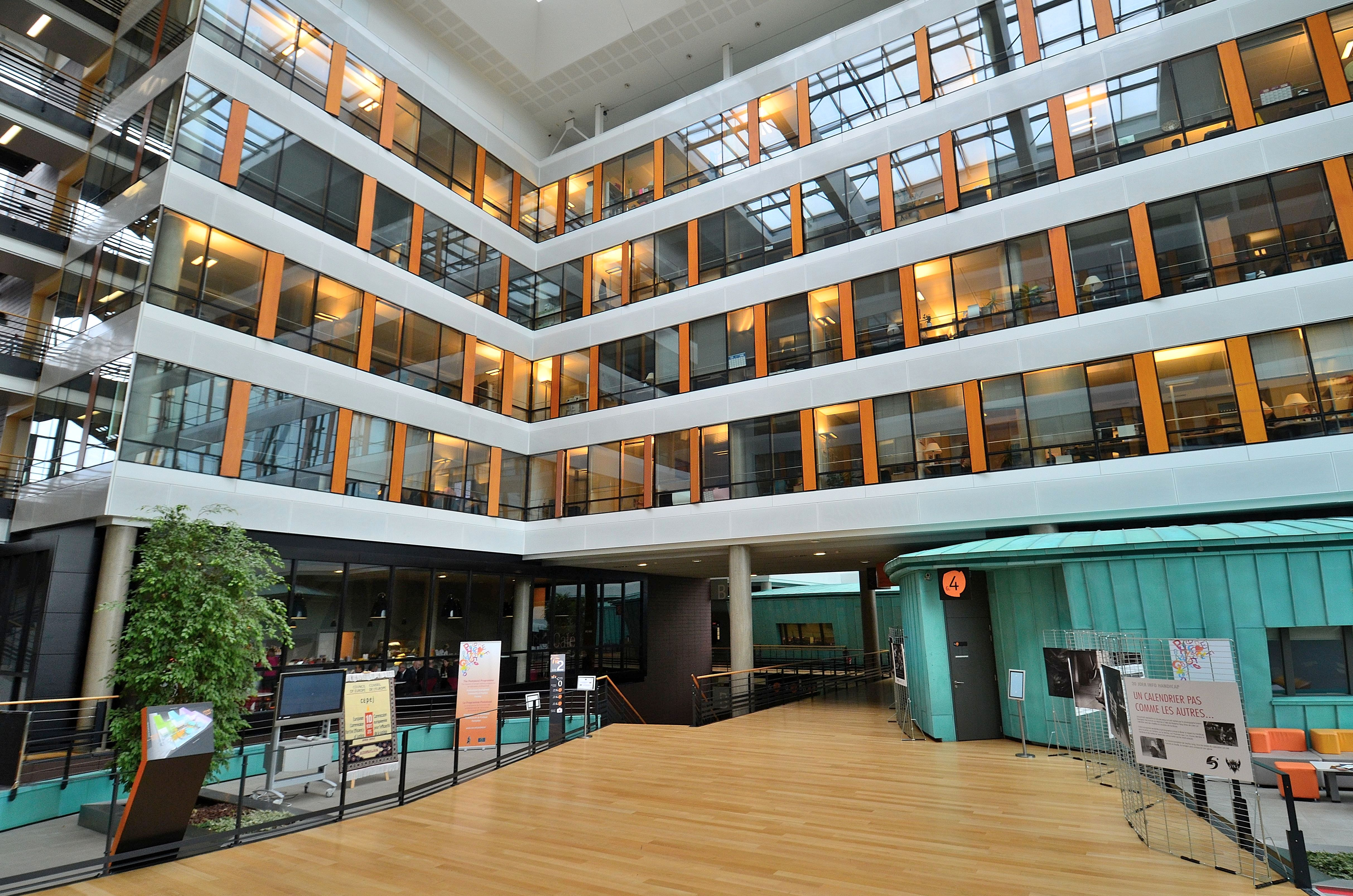
Council of Europe's Agora building, the seat of GRECO Secretariat

The Group of States against Corruption (French: groupe d'États contre la corruption, GRECO) is the Council of Europe's anti-corruption monitoring body with its headquarters in Strasbourg (France). It was established in 1999 as an enlarged partial agreement by 17 Council of Europe member states.

GRECO, which is also open to non-European states, currently has 48 members (46 European states along with Kazakhstan and the United States). Belarus and Russia are former members. Since August 2010, all Council of Europe members have been members of GRECO. However, membership in GRECO is not limited to Council of Europe member states; any state which took part in the elaboration of the enlarged partial agreement may join by notifying the Secretary General of the Council of Europe. Moreover, any state which becomes party to Council of Europe's Criminal or Civil Law Conventions on Corruption automatically accedes to GRECO and its evaluation procedures. While all its member states are GRECO members, the European Union itself is not, but it became an observer in 2019. In May 2024, the GRECO called on European Union institutions to become full members, the GRECO's president saying that it's "a question of will".

The GRECO Secretariat is located in the Council of Europe's "Agora" building completed in 2008.

Of GRECO's 2019 recommendations, Serbia, Turkey and Slovakia did not fully implement any of them while Norway was scored best. Recommendations related to reducing corruption among MPs were least implemented (27 percent). GRECO's president stated in a press release, "This explains to a large extent why people's trust in politics is very low and will be even lower if politicians don't step up their compliance with integrity standards".

The United States will withdraw from GRECO on 31 December 2026.

== Purpose ==
GRECO's objective is to improve the capacity of its members to fight corruption by monitoring their compliance with Council of Europe anti-corruption standards through a dynamic process of mutual evaluation and peer pressure. It helps to identify deficiencies in national anti-corruption policies, with a view to prompting the necessary legislative, institutional and practical reforms. GRECO does not have a mandate to measure the occurrence of corrupt practices in its individual member States. Other organisations/bodies are better equipped to deal with this matter. A widely known example is Transparency International (TI), which issues annually a Corruption Perceptions Index (CPI) ranking more than 150 countries according to perceived levels of corruption, as determined by expert assessments, opinion surveys and other specialised reports such as Global Corruption Barometer and Bribe Payers Index.

The OECD, the United Nations, ICPO-Interpol, the European Bank for Reconstruction and Development (EBRD) and the World Bank were associated with the preparatory work leading to the establishment of GRECO. The need for efficient monitoring mechanisms in this area was widely accepted by these organisations which contributed to discussions held under the aegis of the Council of Europe which eventually led to the establishment of GRECO.

GRECO monitoring comprises an evaluation procedure based largely on information gathered via questionnaires and on-site visits and a compliance procedure designed to assess the measures subsequently taken by its members to implement the recommendations emanating from GRECO's evaluations. On-site visits include meeting with numerous interlocutors, government officials, civil society representatives, academics, etc.

== Topics and provisions subject to mutual evaluation ==
The themes and provisions to be evaluated within an evaluation round are decided on by GRECO. Members are called upon to implement the recommendations issued by GRECO within a period of 18 months. The ensuing compliance procedure assesses the implementation of each individual recommendation and establishes an overall appraisal of the level of a member's compliance.

GRECO's First Evaluation Round (2000–2002) dealt with specific provisions of the Twenty Guiding Principles for the Fight against Corruption: independence, specialisation, means and resources of national bodies engaged in the prevention and fight against corruption, and the extent and scope of immunities enjoyed by certain categories of holders of public office and elected representatives in respect of the investigation, prosecution and adjudication of corruption offences.

The Second Evaluation Round (2003–2006) dealt with themes based on specific provisions of the Twenty Guiding Principles and associated provisions of the Criminal Law Convention on Corruption (ETS 173): identification, seizure and confiscation of corruption proceeds, anti-corruption policies and mechanisms in public administration, prevention of legal persons being used as shields for corruption, tax and financial legislation to counter corruption, links between corruption, organised crime and money laundering.

Any member having joined GRECO after the close of the First Evaluation Round (i.e. as from 2003) is subject to a joint evaluation of the First and Second Round topics.

The ongoing Third Evaluation Round (launched on 1 January 2007) covers two distinct fields, namely

- the transposition into domestic law and practice of the incriminations provided for by the Criminal Law Convention on Corruption (ETS 173);
- the transparency of party funding as understood by reference to several articles of Recommendation Rec(2003)4 on Common Rules against Corruption in the Funding of Political Parties and Electoral Campaigns, and – more generally – to Guiding Principle 15 (i.e. "to encourage the adoption, by elected representatives, of codes of conduct and promote rules for the financing of political parties and election campaigns which deter corruption"), as laid down in the Twenty Guiding Principles for the Fight against Corruption.

GRECO's current Fourth Evaluation Round, launched on 1 January 2012, deals with corruption prevention in respect of members of Parliament, judges and prosecutors. The same priority issues are addressed in respect of all persons/functions under review, namely:

- ethical principles, rules of conduct and conflicts of interest;
- prohibition or restriction of certain activities;
- declaration of assets, income, liabilities and interests;
- enforcement of the applicable rules;
- awareness.

As regards parliamentary assemblies, the evaluation focuses on members of national Parliaments, including all chambers of Parliament and regardless of whether the members of Parliament are appointed or elected. Concerning the judiciary and other actors in the pre-judicial and judicial process, the evaluation focuses on prosecutors and on judges, both professional and lay judges, regardless of the type of court in which they sit, who are subject to national laws and regulations.

GRECO launched on 20 March 2017 its Fifth Evaluation Round which will focus on "Preventing corruption and promoting integrity in central governments (top executive functions) and law enforcement agencies". In the new evaluation round, GRECO will monitor the measures that states have in place to prevent and combat corruption in functions such as those of heads of State, heads of central government, members of central government (e.g. ministers), as well as other political appointees who exercise top executive functions such as deputy ministers, State Secretaries, heads and members of a minister's private office and senior political officials. With regard to these functions, GRECO will look into issues such as conflicts of interest, revolving doors, declaration of assets and accountability mechanisms.

In 2025, GRECO will launch its 6th evaluation round, focusing on preventing corruption and promoting integrity in local and regional authorities.

== Evaluations ==
At the opening of each Evaluation Round, GRECO adopts questionnaires with guidelines and a provisional time-table for evaluations. Members designate a maximum of five evaluators for any given Evaluation Round. The profile of evaluators is determined by the thematic scope of each Evaluation Round. The principal stages of the evaluation procedure are described in the table below.

Evaluation process
STEP 1	A first analysis of the situation in a member State is carried out by the Secretariat on the basis of replies to the questionnaires.
STEP 2	An Evaluation Team, supported by a member of the Secretariat, carries out an on-site evaluation visit (up to 5 days) during which further information is gathered through high-level discussions with key domestic players; the visit also includes talks with representatives of civil society (NGO's, media, professional organisations, etc.).
STEP 3	The members of the Evaluation Team submit their individual written contributions to the draft Evaluation Report, including proposals for recommendations, and a first draft of the Evaluation Report is prepared by the Secretariat and submitted to the Evaluation Team for comments.
STEP 4	A second draft is then drawn up by the Secretariat and sent to the member undergoing evaluation for comments.
STEP 5	The Secretariat consults the Evaluation Team on the comments made by the member. If the views of the evaluators differ, a solution is negotiated; if necessary, a coordination meeting between national representatives, the Evaluation Team and the Secretariat is arranged.
STEP 6	A third draft is then sent to all GRECO members.
STEP 7	Draft evaluation reports are examined by GRECO during its plenary meetings and a revised draft containing any changes required by the debate is prepared for a second reading before adoption by the plenary.
STEP 8	Adopted reports are published with the authorisation of the country concerned.

Overall, the various stages of the compliance procedure are similar to the above. A key ingredient of the procedure is the so-called Situation Report prepared by the member concerned, which has to be submitted 18 months after the adoption of the relevant Evaluation Report. On the basis of the Situation Report, a Compliance Report is prepared which assesses the level of implementation of each recommendation issued by GRECO in the Evaluation Report. The assessment can lead to three possible conclusions, namely that a given recommendation

- has been implemented satisfactorily or otherwise dealt with in a satisfactory manner;
- has been partly implemented;
- has not been implemented.

Members are required to report back to GRECO on the action taken in order to address partially or non-implemented recommendations within another 18 months. The additional information submitted is appraised by GRECO and leads to the adoption of an Addendum to the relevant Compliance report. The adoption of the Addendum usually terminates the compliance procedure in respect of the country concerned.

All information pertaining to evaluation and compliance procedures is confidential. However, it is standing practice for members to authorise the publication of Evaluation and Compliance Reports, usually shortly after their adoption by the plenary.

The reports (Evaluation reports, Compliance reports and Addenda to Compliance reports) relating to the First, Second, Third and Fourth evaluation rounds are made available on-line in the public part of GRECO's website, once authorisation to publish has been given by the member State concerned.

== Strengths ==
The experience gathered in connection with the GRECO process suggests that, ideally, evaluations should be limited in scope, with clear decisions having been taken as to the relevance of certain topics and sub-topics; key questions need to be carefully phrased. Evaluations should also be based on clear and identifiable standards.

Additionally, the collection of first-hand information during on-site evaluation visits (a fundamental feature of GRECO's modus operandi) contributes significantly to the quality of evaluations. On-site visits are a major asset for the credibility of the whole process in that they enable evaluation teams to hold thorough discussions with domestic key players (including representatives of civil society), to request additional information on-the-spot, and to shed light on often blurred and contentious issues.

On-site visits also have the potential of adding value to the "mere" evaluation of legislation. Issues of interpretation of certain legal concepts, relevant to the corruption offence (e.g. "undue advantage", "breach of duty"), the ensuing jurisprudence, as well as the problems involved in properly applying the legislation under scrutiny cannot be adequately addressed without the possibility of discussing these matters with domestic practitioners.

== See also ==
- Asset forfeiture – Confiscation of assets by the state
- European Public Prosecutor – Agency of the European Union
- Global Witness – International non-governmental organisation
- ISO 37001 Anti-bribery management systems – Standard
- International Anti-Corruption Academy – Intergovernmental organization
- International Anti-Corruption Day – Annual event of the UN on 9 December
- List of anti-corruption agencies
- OECD Anti-Bribery Convention – Anti-corruption agreement among high-economic power countries
- Transparency International – International non-governmental organization
- United Nations Convention against Corruption – Anti-corruption treaty
