= OECD Anti-Bribery Convention =

Anti-corruption agreement among high-economic power countries

Convention on Combating Bribery of Foreign Public Officials in International Business Transactions
- Signed: 17 December 1997
- Effective: 15 February 1999
- Signatories: See text
- Languages: English; French

The OECD Anti-Bribery Convention (officially the Convention on Combating Bribery of Foreign Public Officials in International Business Transactions) is an anti-corruption convention of the OECD that requires signatory countries to criminalize bribery of foreign public officials. The convention is a legally binding international agreement that focuses on the supply-side of bribery by criminalizing acts of offering or giving bribes to foreign public officials by companies or individuals. Its goal is to create a level playing field in the international business environment.

A 2017 study found that multinational corporations that were subject to the convention were less likely to engage in bribery than corporations that were based in non-member states. A 2021 study found that the convention may increase bribery by firms from non-ABC member countries and lead firms in ABC member countries to shift to bribery through intermediaries in non-ABC member countries.

== History ==
In 1989, the OECD established an ad hoc working group for comparative review of national legislations regarding the bribery of foreign public officials. In 1994, the OECD Ministerial Council adopted the Recommendation of the Council on Bribery in International Business Transactions. The convention was signed on 17 December 1997 and came into force on 15 February 1999. A 2009 recommendation provides further guidance for signatory countries on how to deter and detect the supply-side of foreign bribery and on how to investigate allegations.

== Principles ==
Parties to the convention agree to establish the bribery of foreign public officials as a criminal offence under their laws and to investigate, prosecute and sanction this offence. Key elements of their commitments include creating a framework in which companies—not just individuals—can be held responsible for foreign bribery, establishing dissuasive sanctions and a basis for jurisdiction that is effective in combating bribery of foreign public officials, and co-operating with foreign law enforcement agencies in the fight against foreign bribery.

The OECD has no authority to implement the convention, but instead monitors implementation by participating countries. Countries are responsible for implementing laws and regulations that conform to the convention and therefore provide for enforcement. The OECD performs its monitoring function in a four-phased examination process, with Phase 4 launched on 16 March 2016. Phase 1 consists of a review of legislation implementing the conventions in the member country with the goal of evaluating the adequacy of the laws. Phase 2 assesses the effectiveness with which the legislation is applied. Phase 3 assesses how well adherents are enforcing the convention, the 2009 recommendation, and any follow-up recommendations from Phase 2. Phase 4 is intended to be a tailored review specific to the needs of the adherent country. The Working Group on Bribery prepares a public report at the end of each phase. These reports are adopted under the principle of consensus-minus-one, meaning that the country under examination cannot block publication of the report.

== Members ==
The convention is open to accession by any country which is a member of the OECD or has become a full participant in the OECD Working Group on Bribery in International Business Transactions. As of 2026, 46 countries (the 38 member countries of the OECD and 8 non-member countries) have ratified or acceded to the convention:

- Argentina
- Australia
- Austria
- Belgium
- Brazil
- Bulgaria
- Canada
- Chile
- Colombia
- Costa Rica
- Czech Republic
- Denmark
- Estonia
- Finland
- France
- Germany
- Greece
- Hungary
- Iceland
- Ireland
- Israel
- Italy
- Japan
- Latvia
- Lithuania
- Luxembourg
- Mexico
- Netherlands
- New Zealand
- Norway
- Peru
- Poland
- Portugal
- Romania
- Russia (suspended) (Note: Suspended since April 2022 due to the Russian invasion of Ukraine)
- Slovakia
- Slovenia
- South Africa
- South Korea
- Spain
- Sweden
- Switzerland
- Turkey
- United Kingdom
- United States

Countries that have participated as observers in the Working Group include China, Indonesia, and Malaysia.

== See also ==
- European Public Prosecutor
- Group of States Against Corruption
- International Anti-Corruption Academy
- ISO 37001 Anti-bribery management systems
- Transparency International
- United Nations Convention against Corruption
