= United Nations Convention Against Corruption =

Anti-corruption treaty

- Signatories (yellow) and ratifiers (green) of the treaty; those who did not sign are in red.
- Drafted: 31 October 2003
- Signed: 9 December 2003
- Location: Mérida and New York City
- Effective: 14 December 2005
- Condition: 30 ratifications
- Signatories: 141
- Parties: 192
- Depositary: Secretary-General of the United Nations
- Languages: Arabic, Chinese, English, French, Russian and Spanish

The United Nations Convention Against Corruption (UNCAC) is the only legally binding international anti-corruption multilateral treaty. Negotiated by member states of the United Nations (UN) it was adopted by the UN General Assembly in October 2003 and entered into force in December 2005. The treaty recognises the importance of both preventive and punitive measures, addresses the cross-border nature of corruption with provisions on international cooperation and on the return of the proceeds of corruption. The UN Office on Drugs and Crime (UNODC) in Vienna serves as the Secretariat for the UNCAC. UNCAC's goal is to reduce various types of corruption that can occur across country borders, such as trading in influence and abuse of power, as well as corruption in the private sector, such as embezzlement and money laundering. Another goal of the UNCAC is to strengthen international law enforcement and judicial cooperation between countries by providing effective legal mechanisms for international asset recovery.

States Parties – countries that have ratified the convention – are expected to cooperate in criminal matters and consider assisting each other in investigations of and proceedings in civil and administrative matters relating to corruption. The Convention further calls for the participation of civil society and non-governmental organisations in accountability processes and underlines the importance of citizens' access to information.

== Signatures, ratifications, and entry into force ==
UNCAC was adopted by the United Nations General Assembly on 31 October 2003 by Resolution 58/4. It was opened for signature in Mérida, Yucatán, Mexico, from 9 to 11 December 2003 and thereafter at UN headquarters in New York City. It was signed by 141 countries. As of October 2023, there are 192 parties, which includes 187 UN member states, the Cook Islands, Niue, the Holy See, the State of Palestine, and the European Union.

As of September 26, 2025, the 6 UN member states that have not ratified the convention are (asterisk indicates that the state has signed the convention):

- Andorra
- Eritrea
- Monaco
- North Korea
- Saint Vincent and the Grenadines
- Syria*

== Measures and provisions of the Convention ==
UNCAC covers five main areas that includes both mandatory and non-mandatory provisions:

- Preventive measures,
- Criminalization and law enforcement,
- International cooperation,
- Asset recovery, and
- Technical assistance and information exchange.

=== General provisions (Chapter I, Articles 1–4) ===
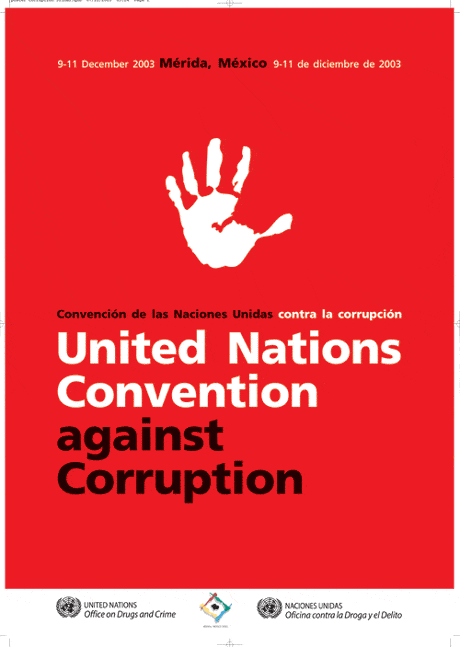
United Nations Convention Against Corruption, 2003

The opening Articles of UNCAC include a statement of purpose (Article1), which covers both the promotion of integrity and accountability within each country and the support of international cooperation and technical assistance between States Parties. They also include definitions of critical terms used in the instrument. Some of these are similar to those used in other instruments, and in particular the United Nations Convention against Transnational Organized Crime (UNTOC), but those defining "public official", "foreign public official", and "official of a public international organization" are new and are important for determining the scope of application of UNCAC in these areas. UNCAC does not provide a definition of corruption. In accordance with Article 2 of the UN Charter, Article 4 of UNCAC provides for the protection of the national sovereignty of the States Parties.,

=== Preventive measures (Chapter II, Articles 5–14) ===
UNCAC recognizes the importance of prevention in both the public and private sectors. Chapter II includes preventive policies, such as the establishment of anti-corruption bodies and enhanced transparency in the financing of election campaigns and political parties. Anti-corruption bodies should implement anti-corruption policies, disseminate knowledge and must be independent, adequately resourced and have properly trained staff.

Countries that sign the convention must assure safeguards their public services are subject to safeguards that promote efficiency, transparency and recruitment based on merit. Once recruited, public servants should be bound by codes of conduct, requirements for financial and other disclosures, and appropriate disciplinary measures. Transparency and accountability in the management of public finances must also be promoted, and specific requirements are established for the prevention of corruption in the particularly critical areas of the public sector, such as the judiciary and public procurement. Preventing corruption also requires an effort from all members of society at large. For these reasons, UNCAC calls on countries to promote actively the involvement of civil society, and to raise public awareness of corruption and what can be done about it. The requirements made for the public sector also apply to the private sector – it too is expected to adopt transparent procedures and codes of conduct.

=== Criminalization and law enforcement (Chapter III, Articles 15–44) ===
Chapter III calls for parties to establish or maintain a series of specific criminal offences including not only long-established crimes such as bribery and embezzlement, but also conducts not previously criminalized in many states, such as trading in influence and other abuses of official functions. The broad range of ways in which corruption has manifested itself in different countries and the novelty of some of the offences pose serious legislative and constitutional challenges, a fact reflected in the decision of the Ad Hoc Committee to make some of the provisions either optional ("...shall consider adopting...") or subject to domestic constitutional or other fundamental requirements ("...subject to its constitution and the fundamental principles of its legal system..."). Specific acts that parties must criminalize include

- active bribery of a national, international or foreign public officials
- passive bribery of a national public official
- embezzlement of public funds

Other mandatory crimes include obstruction of justice, and the concealment, conversion or transfer of criminal proceeds (money laundering). Sanctions extend to those who participate in and may extend to those who attempt to commit corruption offences. UNCAC thus goes beyond previous instruments of this kind that request parties to criminalize only basic forms of corruption. Parties are encouraged – but not required – to criminalize, inter alia, passive bribery of foreign and international public officials, trading in influence, abuse of function, illicit enrichment, private sector bribery and embezzlement, and the concealment of illicit assets.

Furthermore, parties are required to simplify rules pertaining to evidence of corrupt behavior by, inter alia, ensuring that obstacles that may arise from the application of bank secrecy laws are overcome. This is especially important, as corrupt acts are frequently very difficult to prove in court. Particularly important is also the introduction of the liability of legal persons. In the area of law enforcement, UNCAC calls for better cooperation between national and international bodies and civil society. There is a provision for the protection of witnesses, victims, expert witnesses and whistle-blowers to ensure that law enforcement is truly effective.

Russia ratified the convention in 2006, but failed to include Article 20, which criminalizes "illicit enrichment". In March 2013, the Communist Party of the Russian Federation submitted a petition with 115,000 signatures to the State Duma in favour of doing so. In 2015, however, no such law was yet in effect in Russia.

=== International cooperation (Chapter IV, Articles 43–49) ===
Under Chapter IV of UNCAC, States Parties are obliged to assist one another in every aspect of the fight against corruption, including prevention, investigation, and prosecution of offenders. Cooperation takes the form of extradition, mutual legal assistance, transfer of sentences persons and criminal proceedings, and law enforcement cooperation. Cooperation in civil and administrative matters is also encouraged. Based on Chapter IV, UNCAC itself can be used as a basis for extradition, mutual legal assistance and law enforcement concerning corruption-related offences. "Dual criminality", which is a requirement that the relevant offence shall be criminalized in both the requesting and requested country, is considered fulfilled irrespective of whether the same terminology or category of offense is used in both jurisdictions. In case of a request for assistance involving non-coercive measures, States Parties are required to provide assistance even when dual criminality is absent subject only to the basic concepts of their legal systems. Chapter IV also contains other innovative provisions designed to facilitate international cooperation. For example, States Parties that use UNCAC as a basis for extradition shall not consider corruption-related offences as political ones; assistance can also be provided in relation to offences for which legal persons can be held responsible; and bank secrecy cannot be cited as a ground to refuse a request for assistance. In order to ensure speedy and efficient cooperation, each State Party is required to designate a central authority responsible for receiving MLA requests. Overall, Chapter IV provides a broad and flexible platform for international cooperation. However, its provisions do not exhaust all international cooperation issues covered by UNCAC, thus the purposes of UNCAC and provisions of other chapters also need to be taken into consideration.

=== Asset recovery (Chapter V, Articles 51–59) ===
The agreement on asset recovery is considered a major breakthrough and many observers claim that it is one of the reasons why so many developing countries have signed UNCAC. Asset recovery is indeed a very important issue for many developing countries where high-level corruption has plundered the national wealth. Reaching an agreement on this Chapter involved intensive negotiations, as the legitimate interests of countries wishing to recover illicit assets had to be reconciled with the legal and procedural safeguards of the countries from which assistance will be sought. Generally, in the course of the negotiations, countries seeking to recover assets sought to establish presumptions that would make clear their ownership of the assets and give priority for return over other means of disposal. Countries from which the return was likely to be sought, on the other hand, had concerns about the language that might have compromised basic human rights and procedural protections associated with criminal liability and the freezing, seizure, forfeiture and return of such assets.

Chapter V of UNCAC establishes asset recovery as a "fundamental principle" of the convention. The provisions on asset recovery lay a framework, in both civil and criminal law, for tracing, freezing, forfeiting and returning funds obtained through corrupt activities. The requesting state will in most cases receive the recovered funds as long as it can prove ownership. In some cases, the funds may be returned directly to individual victims.

If no other arrangement is in place, States Parties may use the Convention itself as a legal basis. Article 54(1)(a) of UNCAC provides that: "Each State Party (shall)... take such measures as may be necessary to permit its competent authorities to give effect to an order of confiscation issued by a court of another state party" Indeed, Article 54(2)(a) of UNCAC also provides for the provisional freezing or seizing of property where there are sufficient grounds for taking such actions in advance of a formal request being received.

Recognizing that recovering assets once transferred and concealed is an exceedingly costly, complex and all-too-often unsuccessful process, this Chapter also incorporates elements intended to prevent illicit transfers and generate records that can be used where illicit transfers eventually have to be traced, frozen, seized and confiscated (Article 52). The identification of experts who can assist developing countries in this process is also included as a form of technical assistance (Article 60(5)).

=== Technical assistance and information exchange (Chapter VI, Articles 60–62) ===
Chapter VI of UNCAC is dedicated to technical assistance, meaning support offered to developing and transition countries in the implementation of UNCAC. The provisions cover training, material and human resources, research, and information sharing. UNCAC also calls for cooperation through international and regional organizations (many of which already have established anti-corruption programmes), research efforts, and the contribution of financial resources both directly to developing countries and countries with economies in transition, and to the UNODC.

=== Mechanisms for implementation (Chapter VII, Articles 63–64) ===
Chapter VII deals with international implementation through the CoSP and the UN Secretariat.

=== Final provisions (Chapter VIII, Articles 65–71) ===
The final provisions are similar to those found in other UN treaties. Key provisions ensure that UNCAC requirements are to be interpreted as minimum standards, which States Parties are free to exceed with measures "more strict or severe" than those set out in specific provisions; and the two Articles governing signature, ratification and the coming into force of the convention.

== Conference of the States Parties ==
Pursuant to article 63 of UNCAC, a Conference of the States Parties (CoSP) to UNCAC was established to improve the capacity of and cooperation between States Parties to achieve the objectives set forth in UNCAC, and to promote and review its implementation. UNODC acts as the secretariat to the CoSP. At its different sessions, besides regularly calling States Parties and signatories to adapt their laws and regulations to bring them into conformity with the provisions of UNCAC the CoSP has adopted resolutions and has mandated UNODC to implement them, including through the development of technical assistance projects.

The CoSP has established several subsidiary bodies to further the implementation of specific aspects of UNCAC. The Implementation Review Group, focuses on the implementation review mechanism and technical assistance, the Working Group on Asset Recovery, the Working Group on Prevention, as well as expert group meetings on international cooperation meet regularly in the inter-sessional period.

- The first session of the CoSP took place on 10–14 December 2006 at the Dead Sea, Jordan. In its resolution 1/1, States Parties agreed that it was necessary to establish an appropriate and effective mechanism to assist in the review of the implementation of UNCAC. An inter-governmental working group was established to start working on the design of such a mechanism. Two other working groups were set up to promote coordination of activities related to technical assistance and asset recovery, respectively.
- The second session was held in Bali, Indonesia, from 28 January to 1 February 2008. As to the mechanism for the review of implementation, the States Parties decided to take into account a balanced geographical approach, to avoid any adversarial or punitive elements, to establish clear guidelines for every aspect of the mechanism and to promote universal adherence to UNCAC and the constructive collaboration in preventive measures, asset recovery, international cooperation and other areas. The CoSP also requested donors and receiving countries to strengthen coordination and enhance technical assistance for the implementation of UNCAC, and dealt with the issue of bribery of officials of public international organizations.
- The third session of the CoSP took place in Doha, Qatar, from 9 to 13 November 2009. The CoSP adopted the landmark Resolution 3/1 on the review of the implementation of UNCAC, containing the terms of reference of the Implementation Review Mechanism (IRM). In view of the establishment of the IRM, and considering that the identification of needs and the delivery of technical assistance to facilitate the successful and consistent implementation of UNCAC are at the core of the mechanism, the CoSP decided to abolish the Working Group on Technical Assistance and to fold its mandate into the work of the Implementation Review Group. For the first time, the CoSP also adopted a resolution on preventive measures, in which it established the Open-Ended Intergovernmental Working Group on Prevention to further explore good practices in this field. The CoSP was preceded and accompanied by numerous side events, such as the last Global Forum for Fighting Corruption and Safeguarding Integrity (in cooperation with businesses) and a Youth Forum.
- The fourth session of the CoSP took place in Marrakech, Morocco, from 24 to 28 October 2011. The Conference considered the progress made in the IRM and recognized the importance of addressing technical assistance needs in the Review Mechanism. It also reiterated its support for the Working Groups on Asset Recovery and Prevention and established Open-Ended Intergovernmental Expert Group Meetings on International Cooperation to advise and assist the CoSP with respect to extradition and mutual legal assistance.

Other sessions of the CoSP took place in Panama in 2013, the Russian Federation in 2015, Austria in 2017 and the United Arab Emirates in 2019.

== Implementation and monitoring mechanism ==
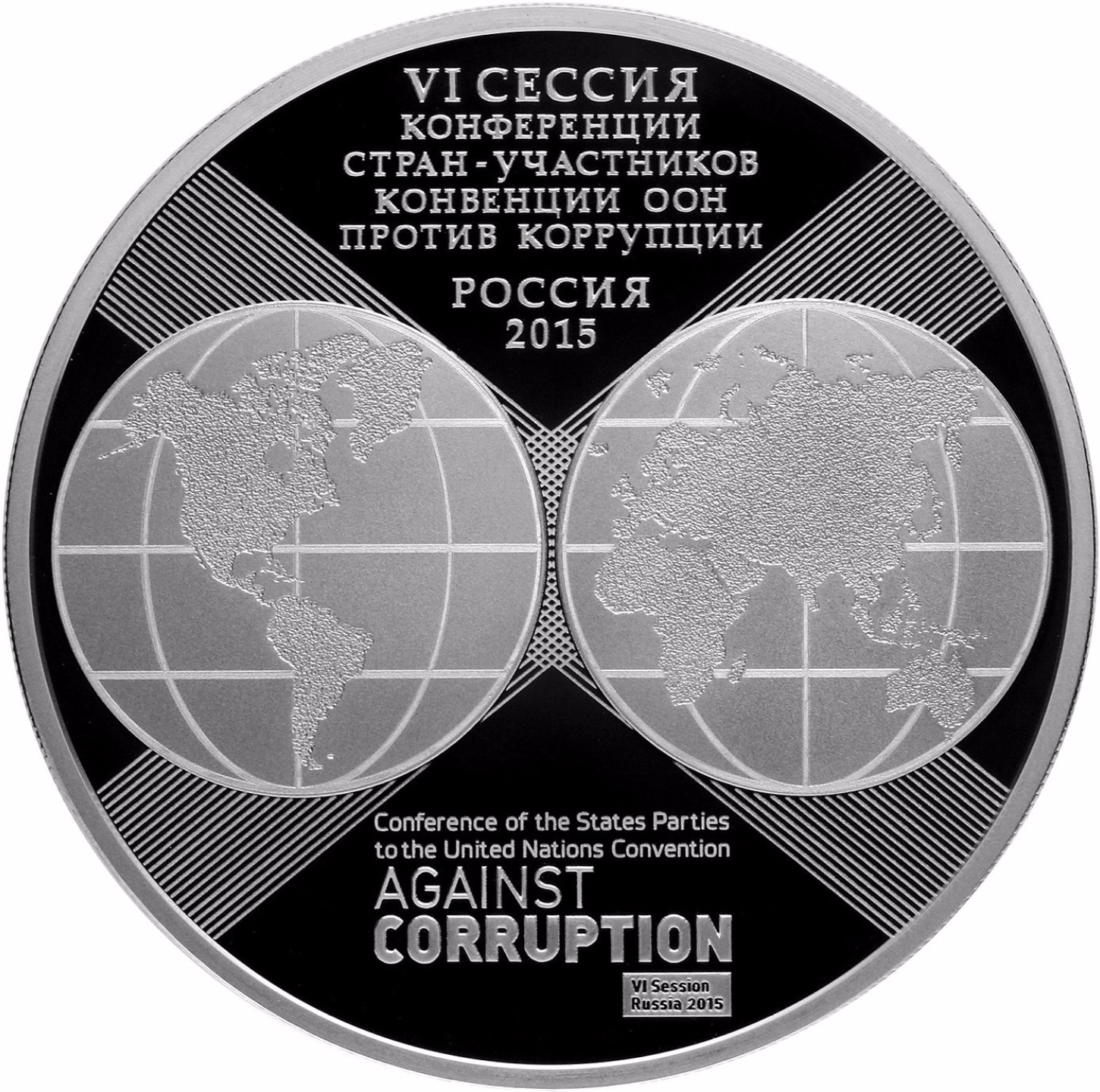

In accordance with Article 63(7) of UNCAC, "the Conference shall establish, if it deems necessary, any appropriate mechanism or body to assist in the effective implementation of the Convention". At its first session, the CoSP established an open-ended intergovernmental expert group to make recommendations to the Conference on the appropriate mechanism. A voluntary "Pilot Review Programme", which was limited in scope, was initiated to offer the adequate opportunity to test possible methods to review the implementation of UNCAC, with the overall objective to evaluate efficiency and effectiveness of the tested mechanism(s) and to provide to the CoSP information on lessons learnt and experience acquired, thus enabling the CoSP to make informed decisions on the establishment of an appropriate mechanism for reviewing the implementation of UNCAC.

The CoSP at its third session, held in Doha in November 2009, adopted Resolution 3/1 on the review of the implementation of the convention, containing the terms of reference of an Implementation Review Mechanism (IRM). It established a review mechanism aimed at assisting countries to meet the objectives of UNCAC through a peer review process. The IRM is intended to further enhance the potential of the UNCAC, by providing the means for countries to assess their level of implementation through the use of a comprehensive self-assessment checklist, the identification of potential gaps and the development of action plans to strengthen the implementation of UNCAC domestically. UNODC serves as the secretariat to the review mechanism.

The Terms of Reference contain procedures and processes for the peer review of the States Parties' implementation of the UNCAC, including the formation of an oversight body called the Implementation Review Group (IRG).

In July 2010 the IRG met for the first time in Vienna and adopted the guidelines for governmental experts and the UNCAC secretariat – the UN Office on Drugs and Crime (UNODC) – in the conduct of a country review. The mechanism consists of a multi-stage peer review which involves the review of each State Party by two peers – one from the same UN region and one from another one. To cover all States Parties, the review process is divided into two five-year cycles where countries are randomly selected to be reviewed in each year of the cycle. The first cycle started in 2010 and covers Chapters III and IV of the convention. The second cycle was launched in November 2015 and is currently underway, covering Chapters II and V, reviewing corruption prevention measures and asset recovery. While the second cycle is scheduled to end in 2021, the process is facing substantial delays, more than three years into the second cycle, only 20 of the 184 countries had completed the review process by May 2019.

It has yet to be decided if and how the review mechanism will continue after the end of the five years foreseen for the second cycle, but if the first cycle is a guide, then the reviews will continue beyond the five years.

A country review process follows these phases:

1. Self-assessment: UNODC informs the State Party that it is under review. The State Party identifies a focal point to coordinate the country's participation in the review and then fills out a standardised self-assessment checklist.
2. Peer review: two reviewer States Parties – decided by lots – provide experts to form a review team. The team conducts a desk review of the completed self-assessment checklist. It may require further information from the focal point and direct dialogue through conference calls, or a country visit if agreed by the country reviewed.
3. Country review report and executive summary: with the assistance of UNODC, the expert review team prepares a country review report (80–300 pages). The report is sent to the focal point for approval. In cases of disagreement, the reviewers and the contact point engage in dialogue to arrive at a consensual final report, which is published in full only with the agreement of the country under review. The expert review team produces an executive summary of this report (7–12 pages), which is automatically published on the UNODC website.

== UNCAC Coalition ==
The UNCAC Coalition, established in 2006, is a global network of over 350 civil society organisations (CSOs) in over 100 countries, committed to promoting the ratification, implementation and monitoring of the UNCAC. The Coalition engages in joint action around common positions on the UNCAC, facilitates the exchange of information among members, and supports national civil society efforts to promote the UNCAC. Coalition members share views via the Coalition website and a mailing list and ad hoc working groups. The Coalition supports civil society organisations to engage in and contribute to the UNCAC review process, including through technical support.

The Coalition, directly and through its members, advocates for greater transparency and space for civil society participation in all UNCAC fora – the Conference of States Parties, the meetings of the Implementation Review Group, working groups and the review process on the national level. Furthermore, the Coalition seeks to advance discussions on key issues covered by the convention, including:

- Access to information
- Asset recovery
- Beneficial company ownership transparency
- Protection of whistleblowers and anti-corruption activists

It aims to mobilize broad civil society support for UNCAC and to facilitate strong civil society action at national, regional and international levels in support of UNCAC. The Coalition is open to all organizations and individuals committed to these goals. The breadth of UNCAC means that its framework is relevant for a wide range of CSOs, including groups working in the areas of human rights, labour rights, governance, economic development, environment and private sector accountability.

== Challenges ==
Ratification of UNCAC, while essential, is only the first step. Fully implementing its provisions presents significant challenges for the international community as well as individual States parties, particularly in relation to the innovative areas of UNCAC. For this reason, countries have often needed policy guidance and technical assistance to ensure the effective implementation of UNCAC. The results of the first years of IRM have shown that many developing countries have identified technical assistance needs. According to the provisions of the United Nations Convention against Corruption, providing technical assistance is crucial to ensuring that the provisions of the United Nations Convention against Corruption are fully and effectively incorporated into the domestic legal system, especially into the realities of daily life.

== See also ==
- Auditor general
- European Public Prosecutor's Office
- Group of States against Corruption
- International Anti-Corruption Academy
- International Anti-Corruption Day
- International asset recovery
- International Association of Anti-Corruption Authorities
- ISO 37001 Anti-bribery management systems
- Maritime anti-corruption
- OECD Anti-Bribery Convention
- Transparency International
- United Nations Convention Against Transnational Organized Crime
- United Nations Global Compact
- United Nations Office on Drugs and Crime
- Law on transparency, the fight against corruption and the modernization of economic life
