= Bribery Act =

Bribery Act may refer to:

- Bribery Act 2010, UK legislation
- International Anti-Bribery Act of 1998, United States legislation
