= Ng Lap Seng =

Macau businessman

- Born: June 1948 (age 78); China
- Occupation: Real estate businessman
- Title: Chairman, Sun Kian Ip Group

David Ng Lap Seng (Chinese: 吳立勝; pinyin: Wú Lìshèng; Jyutping: Ng4 Lap6 Sing1; born June 1948) is a Macau-based Chinese billionaire real estate businessman, chairman of the Sun Kian Ip Group (新建业集团). He is a member of the National Committee of the Chinese People's Political Consultative Conference (CPPCC).

== Criminal investigation ==
Ng Lap Seng is the subject of an American investigation, and faces bribery, money laundering and other charges, as he allegedly that he paid bribes via intermediaries totalling US$500,000 to former UN General Assembly president John William Ashe.

According to Farrukh Khan, the Program Manager on Climate Finance at the UN Secretary General's Office, Ashe played a central role in the negotiations for the Sustainable Development Goals (SDGs). On 22 September 2014 Ashe launched the Global Sustainable Development Foundation to support the Millennium Development Goals (MDGs) and the SDGs. It was to "support the UN's mission and accelerate the achievement of the MDGs and SDGs".

According to a 2021 report by IPS News, "John William Ashe skillfully set the stage for the SDGs by working with larger countries to create a process for the SDGs that truly had global buy in."

On 7 March 2015 Ng's Sun Kian Ip Group signed a "cooperation agreement" with the Director of the United Nations Office for South-South Cooperation (UNOSSC), Yiping Zhou. In April 2015 the deputy director of the UNOSSC, Inyang Ebong-Harstrup, met with Ng in Macau. In August 2015 the Sun Kian Ip Group sponsored a High-Level Strategy Forum for the UNOSSC. The Forum was also attended by former President of the UN General Assembly, John William Ashe. Ashe was arrested, along with Ng and others, in October 2015 by the FBI.

Since October 2015, he has been confined to his New York City apartment on US$50 million bail, with very tight restrictions. As of January 2016, two suspects have pleaded guilty. In March 2016, a third suspect, Francis Lorenzo, deputy ambassador to the United Nations from the Dominican Republic, pleaded guilty.

US prosecutors estimate that Ng's net worth is in excess of US$1 billion.

Ng Lap Seng was also part of a Democratic fund-raising scandal when Bill Clinton was president, and is mentioned in the Panama Papers.

In July 2017, the U.S. District Court in Manhattan found Ng guilty of all charges he faced, following a month-long trial.

The Supreme Court of the United States rejected an attempt by Ng in 2019 to argue that U.N. officials do not fall under the purview of the Foreign Corrupt Practices Act (FCPA).

On 16 March 2020 a Petition for Writ of Certiorari was submitted to the United States Court of Appeals for the Second Circuit. The Second Circuit affirmed Ng's conviction under 18 U.S.C. SS666, "which criminalises bribery of any agent", and under the Foreign Corrupt Practices Act (FCPA).

On 1 June 2020 "The court held that the word 'organization' as used in section 666, and defined by 1 U.S.C. 1 and 18 U.S.C. 18, applies to all non‐government legal persons, including public international organizations such as the U.N. The court also held that the 'official act' quid pro quo for bribery as proscribed by 18 U.S.C. 201(b)(1), defined by id. section 201(a)(3), and explained in McDonnell v. United States, does not delimit bribery as proscribed by section 666 and the FCPA."

On 17 March 2021 a U.S. judge ordered Ng Lap Seng's release from prison on "compassionate release" saying he would be safer in Macau than in a prison during the coronavirus pandemic. Ng had served 34 months of his four-year prison sentence following his 2017 conviction for bribing two United Nations ambassadors.

On 21 April 2021 Ng Lap Seng returned to Macau. He spent three weeks in a quarantine hotel. Ng had been scheduled to be released from prison on 23 December 2021.

== 1996 United States campaign finance controversy ==
Ng Lap Seng was implicated in the 1996 United States campaign finance controversy, being named in 1998 Senate Report Investigation on Illegal or Improper Activities in Connection With The 1996 Federal Election Campaigns. In the report, Ng is said to have transferred approximately $1.4 million to Yah-Lin "Charlie" Trie from 1994 to 1996. Trie was convicted and sentenced to three years' probation and four months' home detention for violating federal campaign finance laws after he attempted to donate $450,000 to Bill Clinton's legal defense fund (for his impeachment trials). According to the Senate Report, Ng Lap Seng is said to have laundered his donations through Trie and others to the Democratic National Committee so that Ng could attend a White House function.
