= Corruption of Foreign Public Officials Act =

Canadian anti-corruption law

Parliament of Canada
- Long title: An Act respecting the corruption of foreign public officials and the implementation of the Convention on Combating Bribery of Foreign Public Officials in International Business Transactions, and to make related amendments to other Acts
- Commenced: 1999
- Status: Current legislation

The Corruption of Foreign Public Officials Act (CFPOA, French: Loi sur la corruption d’agents publics étrangers) is an anti-corruption law in force in Canada. It entered into force in 1999, ratifying the OECD Convention on Combating Bribery of Foreign Public Officials in International Business Transactions and is often referred to as the Canadian equivalent to the United States' Foreign Corrupt Practices Act (FCPA).

== Jurisdiction ==
Under section 5 subsection 1 of the CFPOA, every person who contravenes the Act (sections 3 and 4) outside Canada that is a Canadian citizen, a permanent resident, or "a public body, corporation, society, company, firm or partnership that is incorporated, formed or otherwise organized under the laws of Canada or a province," is deemed to have committed the offence in Canada. Thereby giving the Act jurisdictional powers over persons or entities committing bribery within Canada or Canadian bodies abroad. It also outlines in subsection 2 the jurisdiction to proceed with trials and punishment "in any territorial division in Canada."

== Provisions ==
The Act states that: "Every person commits an offence who, in order to obtain or retain an advantage in the course of business, directly or indirectly gives, offers or agrees to give or offer a loan, reward, advantage or benefit of any kind to a foreign public official or to any person for the benefit of a foreign public official as consideration for an act or omission by the official in connection with the performance of the official's duties or functions" or "to induce the official to use his or her position to influence any acts or decisions of the foreign state or public international organization for which the official performs duties or functions."

In Canada "CFPOA 36 criminalizes the corruption of foreign public officials", and the "Criminal Code criminalizes the corruption of domestic public officials".

== Amendments ==
On June 19, 2013, an amendment to CFPOA, Bill S-14, was passed to strengthen the Act against corruption and bribery. This included a notification that the existing exclusion of facilitation payments in the Act, would be eliminated at a future date. facilitation payments or "grease payments", are "made to expedite or secure the performance by a foreign public official". Since October 31, 2017, facilitation payments are no longer excluded. In 2009, the Organization for Economic Co-operation and Development (OECD) recommended that member nations discourage the use of facilitating payments by businesses. This amendment aligned Canada further with other OECD countries.

== International Anti-Corruption Unit ==
The Royal Canadian Mounted Police (RCMP) has "the exclusive authority to lay charges under the CFPOA." In 2008, the RCMP established the International Anti-Corruption Unit was established in 2008 with two teams of seven−one based in Calgary and the other in Ottawa.

== Background ==
Canada has a history of not responding forcefully to combat international bribery of foreign public officials. In its March 2011 report, the OECD Working Group on Bribery said that the CFPOA was limited in its jurisdiction, had an insufficient numbers of investigators, and applied weak penalties in the event of a conviction. According to the report since the implementation CFPOA in 1999 until 2011, there had been only case that led to a conviction under CFPOA—the 2005 Hydro Kleen case. It involved a private lawsuit against the Alberta-based company, Hydro Kleen, which resulted in the company pleading guilty to bribing a US immigration official. The investigation was not regarded as a particularly complex one that required minimal investigation of one State employee based in North America. The fine of CAD 25,000 levied on the company after it had admitted to paying CAD 28,299 in bribes was hardly punitive.

In May 2011, the NGO Transparency International suggested that Canada was a long way behind other developed countries, identifying it as one of 21 states undertaking "little or no enforcement" of their anti-bribery legislation". It reported that "Canada is the only G7 country in the little or no enforcement category, and has been in this category since the first edition of this report in 2005".

According to the compliance consultancy Billiter Partners, by March 2011, Canadian authorities had never charged a "well-known Canadian firm for bribery" under CFPOA, unlike its counterpart in the United States, the Foreign Corrupt Practices Act.

The first major CFPOA prosecution involved Niko Resources, a Canadian company that had bid on a multimillion-dollar contract for the supply of a security system in India. the Royal Canadian Mounted Police (RCMP) had begun their investigation the company in January 2010 over allegations that it had made improper payments to government officials in Bangladesh. This high-profile CFPOA investigation resulted in charges being made in May 2010 against Nazir Karigar for allegedly "provided a luxury SUV worth over $190,000 and paid for the air travel for a Bangladesh minister to persuade him to decide a contract dispute in the [Nilo's] favor." When Niko Resources pled guilt and "agreed to pay the Canadian government $9.5 million to settle the case, this was seen as a "positive sign" for future CFPOA cases.

By May 2010, CFPOA prosecutors were investigating 20 corruption cases.

In their 2016-2017 report to parliament, ongoing cases involved SNC-Lavalin, Cryptometrics, and Canadian General Aircraft in Calgary.

== Concluded cases ==
Matters concluded involved cases related to the Padma Multipurpose Bridge Project, World Bank Group v. Wallace, Griffiths Energy International Inc, Niko Resources Ltd., and Hydro-Kleen Group Inc.

On January 25, 2013, Calgary-based Griffiths International Energy Inc., a privately held oil and gas company pleaded guilty to bribing the Chadian Ambassador to Canada to bid for an oil and gas contract in Chad. Griffiths had "voluntarily self-disclosed its internal investigation" to the RCMP's International Anti-Corruption Unit in November 2011.

=== Conviction of individuals under CFPOA ===
In 2016, the court sentenced Nazir Karigar to a three-year prison term, the first conviction of an individual under the CFPOA. The second CFPOA conviction of an individual was on December 17, 2018, when Quebec's Superior Court of Justice handed down a three-year sentence to Yanaï Elbaz for his "involvement in a bribery scheme in which SNC-Lavalin secured a $1.3 billion contract to build McGill University Health Centre (MUHC). Elbaz was a MUHC senior manager at the time. The trial and sentencing of Mr. Elbaz is "one of the most significant corruption convictions in Canadian history, and may mark a shift in Canada’s enforcement of its anti-bribery legislation".

== See also ==
- United Nations Convention against Corruption
- Politically exposed person
- The UK Bribery Act
- OECD Anti-Bribery Convention
