= Foreign official =

Beaureucrat sent to a foreign mission

Foreign official or foreign public official refers to a person who acts in an official capacity for a foreign government. The term is chiefly used in connection with international conventions and national laws against corruption in international trade.

== International law ==
Members of the Organization for Economic Cooperation and Development (OECD) agreed the OECD Anti-Bribery Convention in 1999 and this treaty has been ratified by 39 countries. The document defines a foreign public official as follows:

And expands the definition as such:

"Public function" includes any activity in the public interest, delegated by a foreign country, such as the performance of a task delegated by it in connection with public procurement.

A "public agency" is an entity constituted under public law to carry out specific tasks in the public interest.

A "public enterprise" is any enterprise, regardless of its legal form, over which a government, or governments, may, directly or indirectly, exercise a dominant influence. This is deemed to be the case, inter alia, when the government or governments hold the majority of the enterprise's subscribed capital, control the majority of votes attaching to shares issued by the enterprise or can appoint a majority of the members of the enterprise's administrative or managerial body or supervisory board.

The definition of a foreign official defined in the OECD agreement is now referenced in enforcement actions by the United States Department of Justice.

== National jurisdictions ==
=== US Department of Justice definition ===
According to the US Department of Justice, the term "foreign official" is defined as:

any officer or employee of a foreign government or any department, agency, or instrumentality thereof, or of a public international organization, or any person acting in an official capacity for or on behalf of any such government or department, agency, or instrumentality, or for or on behalf of any such public international organization.

—

The Foreign Corrupt Practices Act applies to US companies and foreign organisations or persons doing business within the borders of the United States. This definition also applies to issuers of publicly traded securities (companies traded on US stock exchanges and in other US markets). The intent of the law is to stop the bribing of foreign officials so that the actual providing of funds to foreign governments directly would not constitute a violation.

== Risks of business with foreign officials ==
The process of recognising if an entity is doing business with an individual who would be considered a foreign official is not only necessary from a compliance perspective, but also necessary when evaluating the risks in a company's business model. This process can be very simple or may be quite complex depending on how many relationships an entity has in place. The process of identifying foreign officials is typically carried out by the comparisons of client or third-party lists with lists of foreign officials that contain the names and positions of such officials, as well as unique identifiers such as dates of birth, photos, and contact numbers.

The term foreign official should not be confused with the term "politically exposed person", as this term relates to the financial sector and its clients. The term "foreign official" relates to all industries.

== See also ==
- Bribery Act 2010 (United Kingdom)
- Corruption of Foreign Public Officials Act (Canada)
- OECD Anti-Bribery Convention
- Politically Exposed Person
