= Prevention of Corruption Act =

Stock short title used for legislation

Prevention of Corruption Act (with its variations) is a stock short title used for legislation in India, Malaysia, Singapore and the United Kingdom relating to corruption and bribery. The Bill for an Act with this short title will have been known as a Prevention of Corruption Bill during its passage through Parliament.

Prevention of Corruption Acts may be a generic name either for legislation bearing that short title or for all legislation which relates to corruption. It is a term of art in the United Kingdom

== List ==
=== India ===
- The Prevention of Corruption Act, 1988

=== Malaysia ===
- The Prevention of Corruption Act 1961

=== Singapore ===
- The Prevention of Corruption Act (Chapter 241)

=== United Kingdom ===
- The Public Bodies Corrupt Practices Act 1889 (52 & 53 Vict. c. 69)
- The Prevention of Corruption Act 1906 (6 Edw. 7. c. 34)
- The Prevention of Corruption Act 1916 (6 & 7 Geo. 5. c. 64)

The Prevention of Corruption Acts 1889 to 1916 is the collective title of the Public Bodies Corrupt Practices Act 1889, the Prevention of Corruption Act 1906 and the Prevention of Corruption Act 1916. These acts were repealed by schedule 2 of the Bribery Act 2010.

== See also ==
- List of short titles
- Jan Lokpal Bill
- The Lokpal and Lokayuktas Act, 2013
