= Facilitation =

Facilitation may refer to:

- Facilitation (organisational), the designing and running of successful meetings and workshops in organizational settings
- Ecological facilitation, the process by which an organism profits from the presence of another, such as nurse plants that provide shade for new seedlings or saplings (e.g. using an orange tree to provide shade for a newly planted coffee plant)
- Neural facilitation, the increase in postsynaptic potential evoked by a second impulse in neurons
- Social facilitation, the tendency for people to perform differently when in the presence of others than when alone
- Criminal facilitation, assisting, but not participating in, the commission of a crime

== See also ==
- Facilitator
- Facilitated communication
- Facilitated diffusion
- Facilitating payment
- Enabling
