= Foreign Corrupt Practices Act =

United States federal law

- Other short titles: Domestic and Foreign Investment Improved Disclosure Act; Securities Exchange Act of 1934 Amendment; Unlawful Corporate Payments Act
- Long title: An Act to amend the Securities Exchange Act of 1934 to make it unlawful for an issuer of securities registered pursuant to section 12 of such Act or an issuer required to file reports pursuant to section 15(d) of such Act to make certain payments to foreign officials and other foreign persons, to require such issuers to maintain accurate records, and for other purposes.
- Acronyms (colloquial): FCPA
- Nicknames: Foreign Corrupt Practices Act of 1977
- Enacted by: the 95th United States Congress
- Effective: December 19, 1977

Citations
- Public law: 95-213
- Statutes at Large: 91 Stat. 1494

Codification
- Titles amended: 15 U.S.C.: Commerce and Trade
- U.S.C. sections amended: 15 U.S.C. ch. 2B § 78a et seq.

Legislative history
- Introduced in the Senate as S. 305 by William Proxmire (D-WI) on January 18, 1977; Committee consideration by Senate Banking, House Commerce; Passed the Senate on May 5, 1977 (passed); Passed the House on November 1, 1977 (passed, in lieu of H.R. 3815); Reported by the joint conference committee on December 6, 1977; agreed to by the Senate on December 6, 1977 (agreed) and by the House on December 7, 1977 (349-0); Signed into law by President Jimmy Carter on December 19, 1977

The Foreign Corrupt Practices Act of 1977 (FCPA) (15 U.S.C. § 78dd-1, et seq.) is a United States federal law that prohibits U.S. citizens and entities from bribing foreign government officials to benefit their business interests.

The anti-bribery provisions of the FCPA have applied to all U.S. persons and certain foreign issuers of securities. Following amendments made in 1998, the Act also applies to foreign firms and persons who, either directly or through intermediaries, help facilitate or carry out corrupt payments in U.S. territory.

Pursuant to its anti-bribery purpose, the FCPA amends the Securities Exchange Act of 1934 to require all companies with securities listed in the U.S. to meet certain accounting provisions, such as ensuring accurate and transparent financial records and maintaining internal accounting controls.

The FCPA is jointly enforced by the Department of Justice (DOJ) and the Securities and Exchange Commission (SEC), which apply criminal and civil penalties respectively.

Since its passage, the FCPA has been subject to controversy and criticism, namely whether its enforcement discourages U.S. companies from investing abroad. The Act was subsequently amended in 1988 to raise the standard of proof for a finding of bribery. In a 2025 survey of economists, there was overwhelming agreement among economists that ending enforcement of the act would increase global levels of bribery and corruption and none of the surveyed economists held that it would increase the long-term profits and competitiveness of US businesses.

On February 10, 2025, President Trump paused enforcement of the FCPA, leading to a boost in the stock value of companies historically linked to corrupt practices. The pause was lifted in a June 2025 memorandum under new guidelines.

== Provisions and scope ==
The core aim of the FCPA is to prohibit companies and their individual officers from influencing foreign officials with any personal payments or rewards. FCPA applies to any person who has a certain degree of connection to the United States and engages in corrupt practices abroad, as well as to U.S. businesses, foreign corporations trading securities in the U.S., American nationals, citizens, and residents acting in furtherance of a foreign corrupt practice, whether or not they are physically present in the U.S. This is considered the nationality principle of the Act. Any individuals involved in these activities may face prison time. In the 1992 case US v. Liebo, the DOJ filed a case against the vice president in charge of the Aerospace division of Napco International Inc. for violations in accordance with the FCPA. After pleading guilty, Liebo was sentenced to a term of 18 months for the offense violating FCPA's anti-bribery provisions.

The FCPA also extends to foreign companies and individuals who engage in corrupt practices while in the United States, even if the actual bribery occurs outside the country. This extraterritorial reach is based on the principle of territorial jurisdiction. For example, in 2013, French oil and gas company Total S.A. agreed to pay a $245.2 million penalty to settle FCPA charges related to bribes paid to an Iranian official to obtain oil and gas concessions. Although the bribery scheme occurred entirely outside the United States, the SEC and DOJ asserted jurisdiction because Total had registered securities with the SEC and made corrupt payments through U.S. banks.

In the case of foreign natural and legal persons, the Act covers their deeds if they are in the U.S. at the time of the corrupt conduct. This is considered the protective principle of the Act. Moreover, the FCPA governs not only direct payments to foreign officials, candidates, and parties, but payments made to any other recipient in furtherance of influencing a foreign official, candidate, or party. These payments are not restricted to monetary forms and may include anything of value. This is considered the territoriality principle of the act.

The FCPA's prohibition on bribes extends beyond simple monetary payments. The act defines bribes as "anything of value," which encompasses a wide range of tangible and intangible benefits. This can include gifts, travel expenses, entertainment, job/internship offers, scholarships, and charitable donations. For example, in 2012, Eli Lilly and Company, a U.S. pharmaceutical firm, settled an FCPA case involving improper payments made through its subsidiaries to foreign officials in Russia, Brazil, China, and Poland. The bribes included gifts, travel, and entertainment expenses, such as spa treatments, jewelry, and a trip to the 2006 World Cup. Lilly agreed to pay disgorgement of $13,955,196, prejudgment interest of $6,743,538, and a penalty of $8.7 million for a total payment of $29,398,734.

The FCPA is subject to ongoing scholarly and congressional debate regarding its effects on international commerce. Scholars have found that its enforcement discourages U.S. firms from investing in foreign markets. This coincides with the well established observation that companies engaging in mergers and acquisitions in emerging markets face a uniquely increased level of regulatory and corruption risk.

=== Persons subject to the FCPA ===
Issuers
The term "issuer" is used to describe any U.S. or foreign corporation that has a class of securities registered, or that is required to file reports under the Securities and Exchange Act of 1934 (15 U.S.C. § 78dd-1)

Domestic concerns
Refers to any individual who is a citizen, national, or resident of the U.S. and any business entity organized under the laws of the U.S. or one of its states, or having its principal place of business in the U.S. (15 U.S.C. § 78dd-2)

Any legal person
Covers both enterprises and individuals (15 U.S.C. § 78dd-3)

== History ==
In 1975 and 1976, American public life was shaken by dozens of scandals involving bribery of foreign officials by prominent American companies. These disclosures, driven by Securities and Exchange Commission (SEC) enforcement actions and high-profile public hearings by the Church Subcommittee on Multinational Corporations, made headlines for months causing serious problems for foreign leaders important to the United States. Some of the most sensational disclosures involved corrupt payments by Northrop, Lockheed, United Brands, Gulf Oil, and Mobil in Saudi Arabia, Japan, Honduras, Korea, Italy, and the Netherlands. The headlines were punctuated by suicides of corporate executives and foreign officials. One CEO jumped out a window. A European dignitary stepped in front of a streetcar.

Investigations by the SEC in the mid-1970s revealed that over 400 U.S. companies admitted making questionable or illegal payments in excess of $300 million to foreign government officials, politicians, and political parties. The abuses ran the gamut from bribery of high foreign officials to secure some type of favorable action by a foreign government, to so-called facilitating payments that were made to ensure that government functionaries discharged certain ministerial or clerical duties. If the official has no choice but to bribe, and bribery is legal in the country, bribing is seen as necessary for "greasing the wheels", i.e. facilitating the conduct of business. Among the major examples of such practices were the Lockheed bribery scandals, in which officials of aerospace company Lockheed paid foreign officials in several countries to favor their company's products, and the Bananagate scandal, in which Chiquita Brands bribed the president of Honduras for more favorable government policies.

While primarily a domestic scandal, Watergate also had international implications. Investigations revealed that slush funds used for political espionage against the Democrats were also used for bribing foreign officials. This linkage highlighted the pervasive nature of corruption in U.S. businesses and politics. These scandals notably involved substantial bribes paid to foreign officials to secure business advantages overseas, profoundly damaging the reputation of American businesses and, by extension, the U.S. government. This period highlighted a serious need for legislative action to address these corrupt practices. Investigations revealed that President Richard Nixon's reelection campaign, and other corporate entities, utilized funds for illicit purposes, including international bribery. This series of events not only led to President Nixon's resignation but also propelled a national and legislative push towards greater transparency and ethics in both domestic and international business dealings.

In response to these high-profile revelations, Congress enacted the FCPA to bring a halt to the bribery of foreign officials and to restore public confidence in the integrity of the American business system. The Act was signed into law by President Jimmy Carter on December 19, 1977. The enactment of the FCPA was a pivotal moment in U.S. legal history, as it marked the first significant effort to legally prohibit the bribery of foreign officials. It set a standard for moral leadership and integrity in international commerce, underscoring the importance of honest business practices in fostering stable and fair global markets. The first criminal enforcement action under the Act was against Finbar Kenny. Kenny had advanced Sir Albert Henry, Prime Minister of the Cook Islands, $337,000 from postage stamp revenue for Henry's re-election campaign. In 1979, Kenny became the first American to plead guilty of violating the FCPA and was fined $50,000.

=== Amendments ===
The Act was first amended by the Omnibus Trade and Competitiveness Act of 1988, where Title V is known as the "Foreign Corrupt Practices Act Amendments of 1988". It introduced a "knowing" standard in order to find violations of the Act, encompassing "conscious disregard" and "willful blindness." Other amendments were for "bona fide", "reasonable" and lawful gifts under the laws of the foreign country. This meant that individuals and companies could be held liable for corrupt practices if they purposefully ignored the facts or circumstances that would lead a reasonable person to conclude that bribery was likely to occur. The amendments clarified that certain types of payments or gifts that are bona fide, reasonable, and lawful under the laws of the foreign country do not constitute an offense under the FCPA. This was important for U.S. businesses engaging in international operations where cultural norms often include gift-giving as a part of business etiquette.

The second amendment to the FCPA, known as the International Anti-Bribery Act of 1998, was a significant development aimed at enhancing the United States' commitment to combating global corruption. This amendment was designed to implement the provisions of the OECD Anti-Bribery Convention, which sought to create a unified international approach to fighting bribery of foreign public officials in international business transactions. One of the primary changes introduced by the 1998 amendment was the extension of the FCPA's jurisdiction to include certain foreign persons and entities. This meant that not only U.S. citizens and companies but also certain non-U.S. persons and companies acting in furtherance of a corrupt payment while in U.S. territory could be held accountable under the FCPA. This included making it a criminal offense to bribe foreign public officials to obtain or retain business or any improper advantage in the conduct of international business. The 1998 amendments increased the penalties for violations and strengthened enforcement measures.

The FCPA dominated international anti-corruption enforcement from its introduction until c. 2010 when other countries began introducing broader and more robust legislation, notably the United Kingdom Bribery Act 2010. The International Organization for Standardization introduced an international anti-bribery management system standard in 2016. In recent years, cooperation in enforcement action between countries has increased.

==== Influence ====
The FCPA's influence has been profound, changing how companies operate worldwide and how governments enforce against corruption. The Act not only led to heightened awareness and enforcement of anti-corruption measures in the United States but also encouraged other nations to adopt similar laws, fostering a more coordinated international approach to combating bribery and corruption. FCPA and other anti corruption laws also provided companies with increased investor confidence, allowing them to judge a companies' governing board by how ethically sound and compliant to FCPA they are and whether or not they deal and run their business in good faith. Not only did it influence companies to become more self aware of possible corruption within their companies, but it also allowed for a growth in business ethics education. There are now certifications and dedicated courses that provide students and up and coming business professionals with the necessary knowledge needed to avoid and terminate possible corruption within companies and foreign markets.

=== Debates Surrounding Foreign Corrupt Practices ===
Dealing with foreign corrupt practices has many issues in itself. It presents many conversations pertaining to the potential for political interference in an organization, jurisdiction, and political differences across capitals. International organizations may be impeded by differences in legal systems and diplomatic relations. The Government Accountability Office (GAO) revealed in a report that while many companies supported the act and its efforts to improve corporate codes of conduct, there was also major dissatisfaction in regards to certain standards that the act had in place for financial reports. Arguing that there wasn't enough clarification about what the companies needed to report on, especially concerning money. This debate over financial reports has led to the concept of "materiality standard".

== Enforcement ==
The SEC and DOJ are jointly responsible for enforcing the FCPA, since it amends both an SEC Act and the criminal code. SEC enforcement applies to companies regulated by the SEC while the DOJ enforces the Act against individuals and domestic companies' entities not regulated by the SEC. However, enforcement by one agency does not preclude enforcement by the other, and on numerous occasions the DOJ and SEC have initiated enforcement actions against the same company for violations of the FCPA. In 2010 the SEC created a specialized unit for FCPA enforcement. In 2012, the SEC and the DOJ issued their first joint guide to the FCPA, the second edition of this guide was published in 2020.

Imprisonment for FCPA violations is relatively uncommon, yet when it does occur, the sentences, which can include imprisonment or house arrest, typically average around 30 months. Additionally, FCPA-related investigations are often lengthy, with an average duration of approximately 39 months from initiation to conclusion, according to a study by Stanford University.

In recent years, the SEC and DOJ have increasingly focused on individual accountability in FCPA enforcement actions. In 2015, the DOJ announced the "Yates Memo," which prioritized the prosecution of individuals involved in corporate misconduct, including FCPA violations. This policy shift has led to several high-profile cases against executives. In 2019, the former head of Alstom's subsidiary in Indonesia was sentenced to 15 months in prison for his role in a bribery scheme to secure a $118 million power plant contract.

Enforcement of the FCPA continues to improve, allowing for more companies to be held accountable and scrutinized for deals that they make within markets that are known for having a high threat of corruption and bribery.

=== President Trump's executive order ===
Executive Order 14209
- Pausing Foreign Corrupt Practices Act Enforcement To Further American Economic and National Security
- Type: Executive order
- Number: 14209
- President: Donald Trump
- Signed: February 10, 2025; 21 months ago

Federal Register details
- Federal Register document number: 2025-02736
- Publication date: 1977
- Document citation: 90 FR 9587

On February 10, 2025, President Trump signed an executive order directing Pam Bondi, the US attorney-general, to pause enforcement of FCPA. Trump told journalists who were present when he signed the order that “It’s going to mean a lot more business for America”.

A White House official claimed that American companies were damaged by “over-enforcement” of FCPA because “they are prohibited from engaging in practices common among international competitors, creating an uneven playing field". In response, Gary Kalman, executive director of Transparency International US, warned that Trump's action “diminishes – and could pave the way for completely eliminating – the crown jewel in the US’s fight against global corruption”.

A 2026 study found that the executive order led to a boost in the stock value of companies historically linked to corrupt practices.

== Requirements ==
The anti-bribery provisions of the FCPA make it unlawful for a U.S. person, and certain foreign issuers of securities, to make a payment to a foreign official for the purpose of obtaining or retaining business for or with, or directing business to, any person. Since the 1998 Amendment of FCPA they also apply to foreign firms and persons who take any act in furtherance of such a corrupt payment while in the U.S. the meaning of foreign official is broad. For example, an owner of a bank who is also the minister of finance would count as a foreign official according to the U.S. government. Doctors at government-owned or managed hospitals are also considered to be foreign officials under the FCPA, as is anyone working for a government-owned or managed institution or enterprise. Employees of international organizations such as the United Nations are also considered to be foreign officials under the FCPA. A 2014 federal appellate court decision has provided guidance on how the term "foreign official" is defined under FCPA. The 1998 amendment to the FCPA applies to all U.S territories as well with this amendment in turn expanding the jurisdiction of the law to include anyone that is related to the United States and deals in business or foreign affairs.

The FCPA also requires companies whose securities are listed in the U.S. to meet its accounting provisions. These accounting provisions operate in tandem with the anti-bribery provisions of the FCPA and require respective corporations to make and keep books and records that accurately and fairly reflect the transactions of the corporation and to devise and maintain an adequate system of internal accounting controls. It would prevent corporations from knowingly altering these money-keeping records that they utilize for their business. While an increasing number of corporations are taking additional steps to protect their reputation and reduce their exposure by employing the services of due diligence companies tasked with vetting third party intermediaries and identifying easily overlooked government officials embedded in otherwise privately held foreign firms. These foreign companies would be subject to FCPA regulations if they are a part of the U.S. stock market and make payments or file reports of those payments to the SEC.

Regarding payments to foreign officials, the act draws a distinction between bribery and facilitation or "grease payments", which may be permissible under the FCPA, but may still violate local laws. The primary distinction is that grease payments or facilitation payments are made to an official to expedite his performance of the routine duties he is already bound to perform. The exception focuses on the purpose of the payment rather than on its value. Payments to foreign officials may be legal under the FCPA if the payments are permitted under the written laws of the host country. Certain payments or reimbursements relating to product promotion may also be permitted under the FCPA.

A U.S. company acquiring a foreign firm could face successor liability for FCPA violations committed by the foreign firm prior to being acquired. Generally, acquiring companies may be liable as a successor for pre-existing FCPA violations committed by an acquired company where those violations were subject to the FCPA's jurisdiction when committed. This position was further confirmed by the DOJ in a 2014 opinion stating that pre-acquisition conduct by a foreign target company without a jurisdictional nexus to the U.S. would not be subject to FCPA enforcement.

=== Anti-bribery/anti-corruption (ABAC) solutions ===
Businesses increasingly focus on their core competencies, and as a result engage more third parties to provide critical business functions. Companies do not have direct control over their third-party providers, which expose them to regulatory and reputational risk of FCPA violations by those third parties.

In April 2013, The Ralph Lauren Corporation paid off $882,000 to the SEC due to the penalty they received from violating the FCPA. This violation came from an Argentinian subsidiary manager who was paying off officials at customs to have Ralph Lauren merchandise snuck into the country. Ralph Lauren did not have any form of serious FCPA training before this incident as they had never encountered or had issues with corruption beforehand. The company then pledged to increase their due diligence on the matter as they sought to work with the U.S Department Of Justice about their book keeping and make sure that all of their employees are properly trained on matters pertaining to the FCPA and foreign business.

== Application ==
Stronger DOJ and SEC enforcement has increased the prominence of the FCPA from 2010 onwards. The SEC website shows a complete list of enforcement cases since 1978. Notable select cases of the application of FCPA since 2008 are with ALCOA, Biomet, Bizjet, Hewlett-Packard Company, KBR, Marubeni Corporation, News Corporation, Siemens, Smith & Nephew and Walmart de Mexico as follows:

In 2008, Siemens AG paid $450 million in criminal fines to the DOJ and $350 million to the SEC for violating the FCPA. This is one of the largest penalties ever collected for an FCPA case.

In 2012, Japanese firm Marubeni Corporation paid a criminal penalty of US$54.6 million for FCPA violations when acting as an agent of the TKSJ joint venture, which comprised Technip, Snamprogetti Netherlands B.V., Kellogg Brown & Root Inc., and JGC Corporation. Between 1995 and 2004, the joint venture won four contracts in Nigeria worth more than US$6 billion, as a direct result of having paid US$51 million to Marubeni to be used to bribe Nigerian government officials.

In 2012 Smith & Nephew paid US$22.2 million to the DOJ and SEC, and Bizjet International Sales and Support Inc. paid US$11.8 million to the DOJ for bribery of foreign government officials. Both companies entered into a deferred prosecution agreement.

In March 2012, Biomet Inc. paid a criminal fine of US$17.3 million to resolve charges of FCPA violations and US$5.5 million in disgorgement of profits and pre-judgment interest to the SEC.

In January 2014, ALCOA paid $175 million in disgorgement of revenues and a fine of $209 million to settle charges that its Australian bauxite mining subsidiary retained an agent that made bribes to government officials in Bahrain and to officers of Aluminum Bahrain B.S.C. to secure long-term contracts to supply the company with bauxite ore.

In March 2014, Marubeni Corporation agreed with the DOJ to pay a US$88 million fine after pleading guilty to taking part in a scheme to pay bribes to high-ranking Indonesian officials in order to secure a lucrative power project.

In July 2014, Alstom pleaded guilty of violating the FCPA and reached a settlement with U.S. authorities to resolve the FCPA violation charges. The charges involved bribery and corruption in various countries, including Indonesia, Egypt, Saudi Arabia, and others As part of the settlement, Alstom agreed to pay a total of $772 million in fines.

On February 24, 2015, the Goodyear Tire and Rubber Company "Goodyear" agreed to pay more than $16 million to settle FCPA charges that two of its African subsidiaries allegedly paid $3.2 million in bribes that generated $14,122,535 in illicit profits. The SEC FCPA charges involved Goodyear subsidiaries in Kenya and Angola for allegedly paying bribes to government and private-sector workers in exchange for sales in each country. According to the SEC because "Goodyear did not prevent or detect these improper payments because it failed to implement adequate FCPA compliance controls at its subsidiaries" and, for the Kenyan subsidiary, "because it failed to conduct adequate due diligence" prior to its acquisition. It was not alleged that Goodyear had any involvement with or knowledge of its subsidiaries' improper conduct.

In February 2016, VEON Ltd. (formerly VimpelCom Ltd.) agreed to pay a total of $795 million to the DOJ and the SEC to resolve charges of FCPA violations, making it one of the largest FCPA settlements at the time. The charges involve allegations of paying bribes to government officials in Uzbekistan to secure business advantages and obtain operating licenses in the country's telecommunications sector.

In September 2016, Sculptor Capital Management (formerly Och-Ziff Capital Management Group) agreed to pay a total of $412 million to the U.S. DOJ and the SEC to resolve charges of FCPA violations. The company went through a several year investigation into violations of the FCPA for allegedly paying bribes to government officials in several African nations.

In July 2017, Ng Lap Seng, a Macau-based Chinese billionaire real estate businessman, chairman of the Sun Kian Ip Group, and a member of the National Committee of the Chinese People's Political Consultative Conference, was convicted after a five-week trial of two counts of violating the Foreign Corrupt Practices Act, one count of paying bribes and gratuities, one count of money laundering and two counts of conspiracy. In 2018, Ng Lap Seng was sentenced to 48 months in prison and three years of supervised release for his role in a scheme to bribe United Nations ambassadors to obtain support to build a conference center in Macau that would host, among other events, the annual United Nations Global South-South Development Expo (GSSD Expo) organised by the United Nations Office for South-South Cooperation (UNOSSC), then headed by Chinese national Yiping Zhou.

=== Charges ===
In 2009, former U.S. House Representative William J. Jefferson was charged with violating the FCPA by bribing African governments for business interests.

In 2010 the DOJ and the SEC were investigating whether Hewlett-Packard Company executives paid about $10.9 million in bribery money between 2004 and 2006 to the Prosecutor General of Russia "to win a €35 million contract to supply computer equipment throughout Russia." On September 11, 2014, HP Russia pleaded guilty before U.S. District Judge D. Lowell Jensen of the Northern District of California to conspiracy and substantive violations of the anti-bribery and accounting provisions of the FCPA. The court sentenced HP Russia to pay a $58,772,250 fine.

In July 2011, the DOJ opened an inquiry into the News International phone hacking scandal that brought down News of the World, the recently closed UK tabloid newspaper. In cooperation with the Serious Fraud Office (United Kingdom), the DOJ was to examine whether News Corporation violated the FCPA by bribing Metropolitan police officers. Nine police officers were convicted including a senior officer in the Met counter-terrorism command, Det Ch Insp April Casburn, former Met anti-terrorism officer Timothy Edwards, former police officer Simon Quinn, former Met officer Paul Flattley and Scott Chapman, an ex-prison officer.

An April 2012 article in The New York Times reported that a former executive of Walmart de México y Centroamérica alleged in September 2005 that Walmart de Mexico had paid bribes to officials throughout Mexico in order to obtain construction permits, that Walmart investigators found credible evidence that Mexican and American laws had been broken, and that Walmart executives in the U.S. "hushed up" the allegations. According to an article in Bloomberg, Wal-Mart's "probe of possible bribery in Mexico may prompt executive departures and steep U.S. government fines if it reveals senior managers knew about the payments and didn't take strong enough action, corporate governance experts said." Eduardo Bohorquez, the director of Transparencia Mexicana, a "watchdog" group in Mexico, urged the Mexican government to investigate the allegations. Wal-Mart and the US Chamber of Commerce had participated in a campaign to amend FCPA; according to proponents, the changes would clarify the law, while according to opponents, the changes would weaken the law.

In March 2014, Austrian authorities arrested Dmytro Firtash, a Ukrainian businessman who heads the board of directors of Group DF, after a judge in Virginia issued a warrant for his arrest on bribery and other charges. Firtash was released on bail of €125 million, making it the largest in Austrian history. In April 2014, a U.S. grand jury in Chicago formally charged Firtash and five others with violations of the FCPA, including charges such as bribery and money laundering.

In June 2015, Joseph Sigelman, American businessman and former CEO of OfficeTiger, pleaded guilty to FCPA violations as part of a plea agreement with the DOJ. The charges involved allegations of paying bribes to government officials in Colombia to secure business advantages and obtain oil contracts. Sigelman was fined $100,000, concluding the proceedings.

In October 2015, the SEC settled charges against the New York-based pharmaceutical company Bristol Myers Squibb related to its Chinese joint venture. The charges included making unlawful payments and providing other benefits to healthcare providers in state-controlled hospitals to boost prescription sales. From 2009 to 2014, BMS China, a majority owned venture of BMS, engaged in practices such as giving cash, gifts, meals, and sponsoring travel and conferences to secure business, which were improperly recorded as legitimate expenses. The misconduct resulted in over $11 million in profits, for which the fines BMS was ordered to pay were just north of $14 million in total judgement. BMS agreed to return $11.4 million in profits, $500,000 in prejudgment interest, and a $2.75 million penalty. They were additionally required to report on their FCPA compliance for a two-year period.

In October 2024, the SEC settled charges against aerospace and defense company Moog Inc. relating to conduct by its wholly owned Indian subsidiary, Moog Motion Controls Private Limited. According to the SEC, between 2020 and 2022 employees of the subsidiary paid bribes to Indian government officials to secure business and influence public tenders, including through the use of third-party agents and distributors. According to the SEC, Moog Motion Control (MMCPL) had a "prevailing culture to win business at any cost, including improper means. The widespread misconduct at MMCPL reflected a breakdown in internal accounting controls, training, compliance, and tone at the top of the subsidiary." The SEC found that the payments were improperly recorded as legitimate business expenses and that Moog had violated the FCPA’s books and records and internal accounting controls provisions. Without admitting or denying the findings, Moog agreed to cease and desist from further violations and to pay approximately $1.7 million, including a $1.1 million civil penalty and approximately $600,000 in disgorgement and interest.

== Exception ==
FCPA makes an exception for payments referred to as "grease" or facilitation payments. These payments are made to accelerate or secure routine government acts, such as acquiring permits, processing visas, or providing police protection. The DOJ states that such gifts must be nominal and not intended to illegally influence government officials. Similarly, the SEC highlights the need of making limited greasing payments to non-discretionary officials for non-discretionary acts.

However, distinguishing between legitimate grease contributions and criminal bribes might be difficult. This assessment is made after considering factors such as the amount, frequency, and purpose of the payment, as well as the level of the foreign official concerned. Furthermore, the outcome of the transaction or litigation for which the payment was made may affect its legality under the FCPA.

== See also ==
- Corruption of Foreign Public Officials Act in Canada
- Foreign Extortion Prevention Act
- Financial Action Task Force on Money Laundering, another international agreement
- Politically exposed person, a term used in several jurisdictions
