= News embargo =

Tactic for delaying publication by the press of a news item

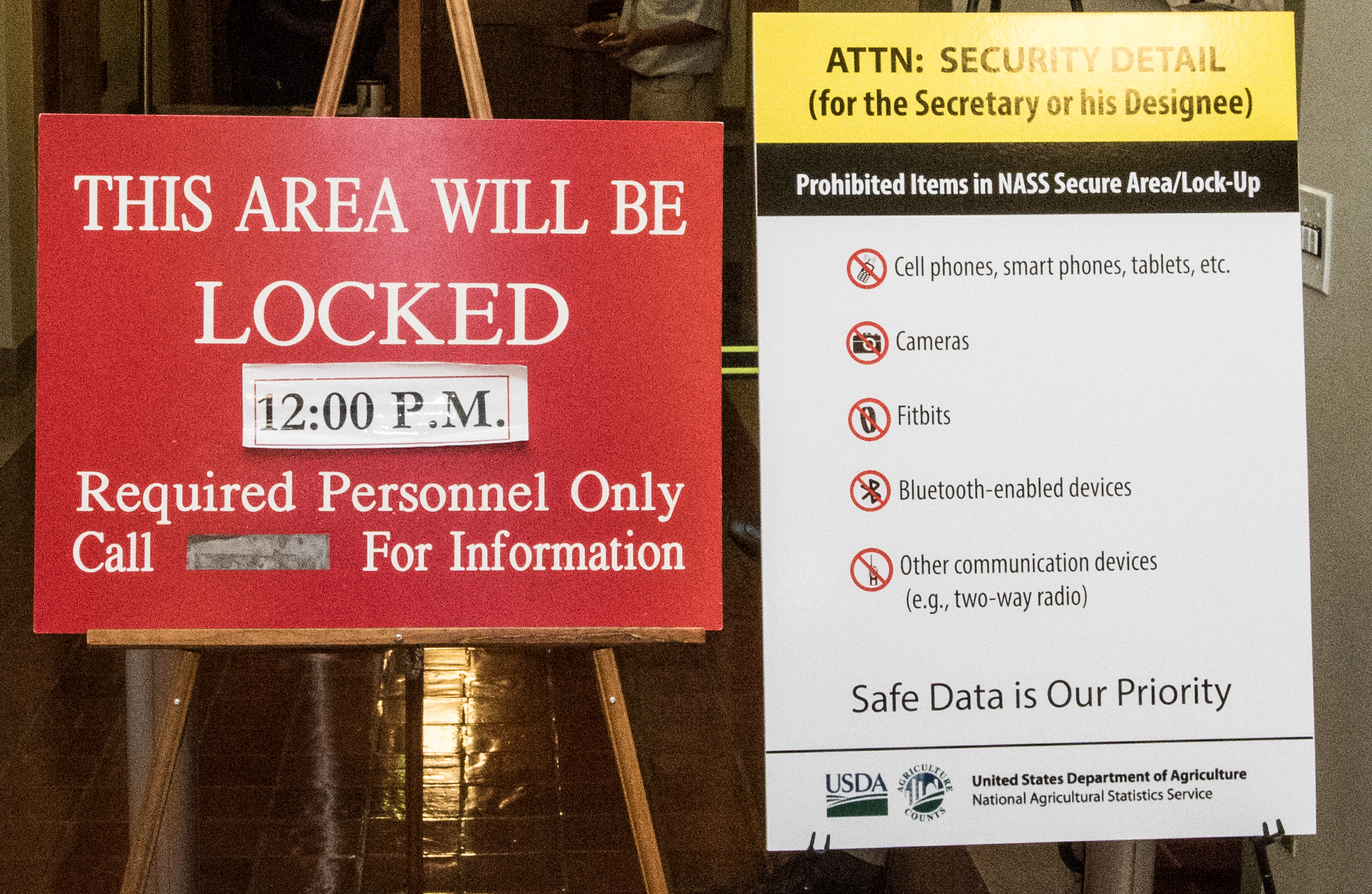
A sign at a U.S. National Agricultural Statistics Service briefing on crop production, held at a secure data room where politicians and journalists are briefed on embargoed data two hours before its release

In journalism and public relations, a news embargo or press embargo is a request or requirement by a source that the information or news provided by that source not be published until a certain date or certain conditions have been met. They are often used by businesses making a product announcement, by medical journals, and by government officials announcing policy initiatives; the media is given advance knowledge of details being held secret so that reports can be prepared to coincide with the announcement date and yet still meet press time.

In theory, press embargoes reduce inaccuracy in the reporting of breaking stories by reducing the incentive for journalists to cut corners by writing up information quickly in hopes of "scooping" the competition. A similar concept are review embargoes in video games, computer hardware and films; in these, reviewers are given early access to content or products in exchange for keeping review results secret until the embargo is lifted, preventing inaccuracies in reviews or lackluster sales at launch or to allow any flaws, bugs or other inconsistencies discovered by reviewers to be fixed before launch, preventing problems after launch.

The understanding is that if the embargo is broken by reporting before then, the source will retaliate by restricting access to further information by that journalist or their publication, giving them a long-term disadvantage relative to more cooperative outlets. Embargoes are usually arranged in advance as "gentlemen's agreements." However, sometimes publicists will send embargoed press releases to newsrooms unsolicited in hopes that they will respect the embargo date without having first agreed to do so—the phrase "For Immediate Release" often found at the top of press releases indicates that the information in the release is not embargoed.

News organizations sometimes break embargoes and report information before the embargo expires, either accidentally (due to miscommunication in the newsroom) or intentionally (to get the jump on their competitors). Breaking an embargo is typically considered a serious breach of trust and can result in the source barring the offending news outlet from receiving advance information for a long period of time.

News embargoes are one of several ways a source can influence media presentation of the information they provide; others include providing information "on background" or "not for attribution", limiting or providing "access", or even direct government or market intervention against the reporters or media company. (See confidentiality terminology in journalism for a full discussion of these.) The manner in which journalists react to these and other attempts to influence coverage are a matter of journalistic ethics.

An example of an embargo being deliberately broken occurred on 19 July 2017. The television presenter and former tabloid editor Piers Morgan antagonised other journalists when he intentionally breached a BBC news embargo. This was in connection with the publication of details of BBC presenters earning more than £150,000 annually. He announced the details via his Twitter account about an hour earlier than the report's indicated time of publication. He excused his action by describing it as a "scoop".

== Examples ==
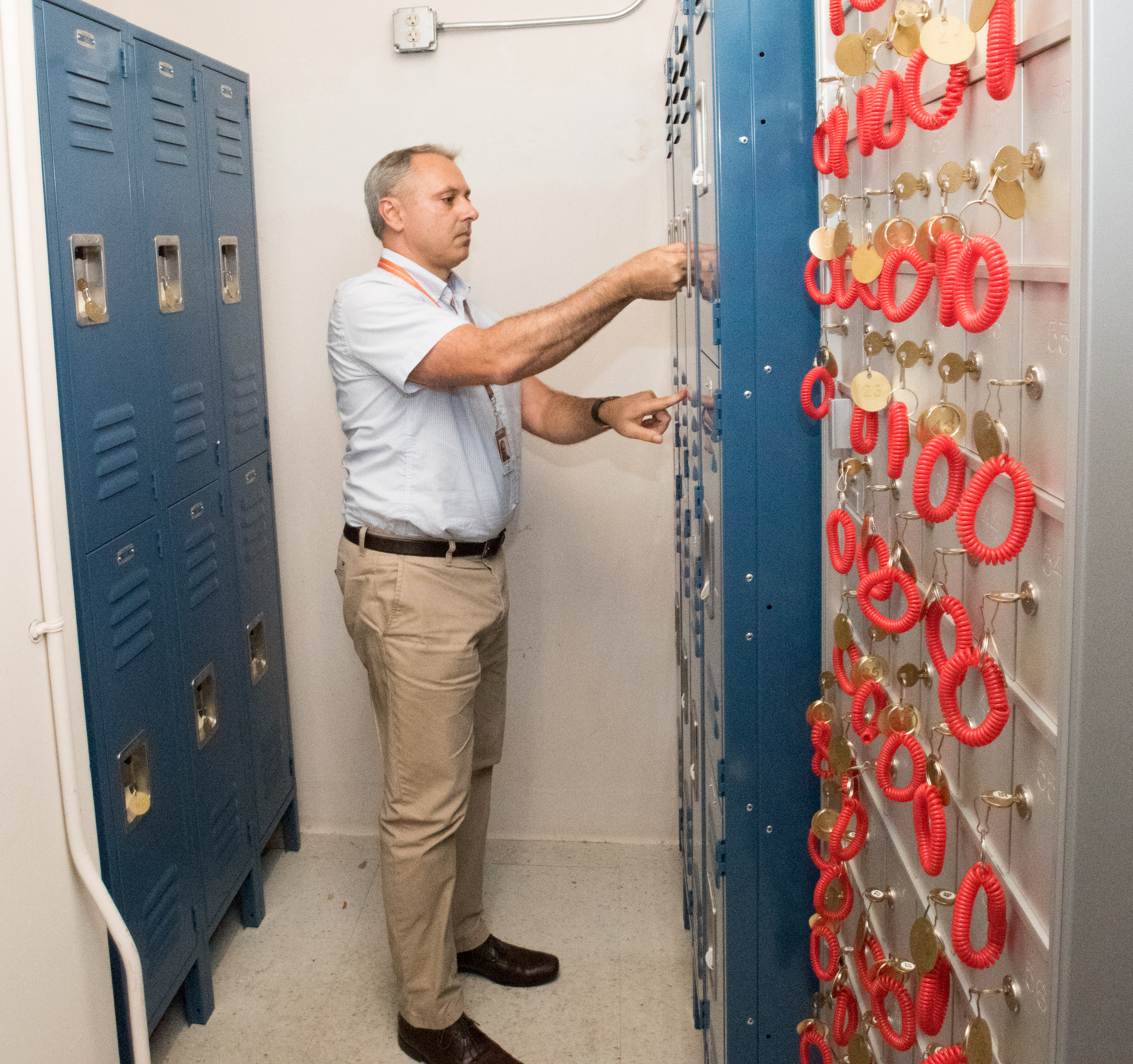
Journalists' mobile phones are locked away at a U.S. National Agricultural Statistics Service briefing on crop production figures before the public release of information at noon.

- Biweekly press briefings from the International Monetary Fund are typically embargoed until 10:30 a.m. Washington time, 1430 GMT (for synchronised effect on global stock markets).
- Reporters who accompanied U.S. President George W. Bush on a Thanksgiving visit to Iraq in 2003 were embargoed from filing until the President left the country. They were told that, in the interests of security, the trip would be canceled if news broke before its conclusion.
- The Ministry of Defence in the United Kingdom informed a small number of journalism outlets that Prince Harry would be serving in Afghanistan, on condition that the information not be released until the end of his deployment. The information was leaked after about two months, and officials agreed to end the embargo. The prince was immediately removed from the battlefield, reportedly for his safety and that of his fellow soldiers.
- In Canada, Australia and other countries, prior to the release of the budget and other important government announcements, reporters are held in a "lockup" so that they can prepare stories in advance. They are not permitted to file until after the official announcement (for example, after the Minister of Finance rises to deliver the budget speech). Lockups are particularly aimed at preventing insider trading on the basis of leaked government announcements. It is uncertain if a similar lockup is done in the United States when the Federal Reserve Board is preparing to adjust an interest rate.

== On articles in scientific journals ==
News embargoes are commonly applied on information of health-related news regarding upcoming medical journal articles. All major medical journals, including the New England Journal of Medicine, the Journal of the American Medical Association, and The Lancet, have publication embargoes.

The JAMA embargo probably dates back to the editorship of Morris Fishbein, from 1924 to 1949, and holds until 15:00 Central Time on the day before the cover date of the issue. Journalists who agree to not publish (in print, on television, on radio, or via Internet) until that time the information contained in a manuscript to be published by the journal receive advance copies of the journal by mail during the week before publication. For selected articles, press releases and news release videos are also prepared by science writers and released to journalists during that week.

The reasons given for such embargoes are twofold. First, they enable journalists to produce more comprehensive and accurate coverage, as the embargo provides time in which they can research the background to a story and thus publish "backgrounders" along with the story's release. Second, they enable doctors and scientists to receive and to analyze medical studies before the general public does, enabling them to be better informed when called upon to comment or to react by journalists or by patients. However, some object to the medical news embargo system, claiming that it is driven by profit motives on the part of the medical journals.

== See also ==
- Coordinated vulnerability disclosure
- Damage control
- Journalism sourcing
- Media bias
- Media democracy
- Media transparency
- News desert
- Publication ban
- Press censorship
