= Prevention of Corruption Act 1906 =

Act of the Parliament of the United Kingdom

Prevention of Corruption Act 1906 (Note: Section 4(1).)
- Act of Parliament
- Parliament of the United Kingdom
- Long title: An Act for the better Prevention of Corruption.
- Citation: 6 Edw. 7. c. 34
- Territorial extent: United Kingdom (Note: Section 3.)

Dates
- Royal assent: 4 August 1906
- Commencement: 1 January 1907 (Note: Section 4(2))
- Repealed: United Kingdom: 1 July 2011 (Note: The Bribery Act 2010 (Commencement) Order 2011.)
Other legislation
Amended by	Costs in Criminal Cases Act 1908; Prevention of Corruption Act 1916; Statute Law Revision Act 1927; Administration of Justice (Miscellaneous Provisions) Act 1933; Criminal Law Act 1967; Courts Act 1971; Local Authorities etc. (Miscellaneous Provision) (No. 2) Order 1974; Statute Law Revision (Northern Ireland) Act 1980; Criminal Justice Act 1988; Law Officers Act 1997; Anti-terrorism, Crime and Security Act 2001
Repealed by	United Kingdom:Bribery Act 2010; Ireland:Criminal Justice (Corruption Offences) Act 2018

Status: Repealed

Text of statute as originally enacted

Revised text of statute as amended

The Prevention of Corruption Act 1906 (6 Edw. 7. c. 34) was an act of the Parliament of the United Kingdom. It was the second of three pieces of legislation regarding corruption which after 1916 were collectively referred to as the Prevention of Corruption Acts 1889 to 1916. It was repealed by the Bribery Act 2010.

Section 1 made it an offence (formerly classified as a misdemeanour) subject to imprisonment up to 7 years:

- for an agent to obtain "any gift or consideration" as an inducement or reward for doing any act, or showing favour or disfavour to any person, in relation to his principal's affairs.
- for any person to give any gift or consideration to an agent to induce him to do an act in relation to his principal's affairs.
- for any person or agent to knowingly falsify receipts, accounts or other documents with the intent to deceive the principal.

The 2017-19 prosecutions of Peter Chapman, and of Alstom and its company officers for conspiracy to corrupt in Lithuania may have been the last prosecutions for this offence.

== Agent and principal ==
An "agent" includes any person employed by or acting for another, and a "principal" includes an employer.

The "principal" is the person the agent is employed by or acting for.

Anyone working for the government counts as an agent.

A prosecution in England and Wales for an offence under the act could not be instituted without the consent of the Attorney-General, who could discontinue an investigation that was working towards a prosecution under the act.

== Subsequent developments ==
Section 2(5) of the act was repealed for England and Wales by section 10(2) of, and part II of schedule 3 to, the Criminal Law Act 1967, which came into force on 1 January 1968.

== See also ==
- Prevention of Corruption Act
