= Facilitating payment =

Payment to government employee to speed up a process without changing the outcome

A facilitating payment, facilitation payment, or grease payment is a payment to government employees to speed up an administrative process whose outcome is already determined. Although ethically questionable, it is not considered to be bribery according to the legislation of some states as well as in international anti-bribery conventions.

== Dangers ==
For legal purposes, it is distinguished from bribery, although the distinction is often blurred. Determining whether a payment is a facilitating one may be difficult and depend on the circumstances. The value of the payment is not immediately relevant, however the greater the value, the higher are chances that it will be a red flag for law enforcement. Small unofficial payments are customary and even legal in some countries, nevertheless they may present a risk of liability according to the laws of the host country. There also exists a slippery slope danger of evolving into dubious payments.

== Business ethics ==
While being legal, facilitating payments are still considered to be questionable from the point of view of business ethics. The following arguments have been made:

- unfair competition: smaller business have fewer opportunities and less financial possibilities to "grease" foreign officials
- sustaining questionable business practices
- dependence on irregular payments creates additional risk and hence discourages investment

Many companies therefore restrict or severely limit making facilitating payments in their policies, however this practice is not yet widespread. For example, as of 2006, in Australia, among the S&P ASX 100 only 24 companies control facilitating payments and only 15 are reported to prohibit them.

== By country ==
=== Australia ===
As of 2006, the Australian law has discrepancies as to the definition of the facilitating payment.

The Criminal Code defines a facilitating payment to be a payment which is:

- of a nominal value (the term is not defined in the Code)
- paid to a foreign official for the sole or predominant purpose of expediting a minor routine action, and
- documented as soon as possible.

The Income Tax Assessment Act, as amended in 1999, permits companies to claim facilitation payments as deductions (before 1999 bribes were also valid deductions), but its definition does not refer to the size of the payment.

Many Australian states override the federal legislation and define facilitating payments as illegal.

=== United Kingdom ===
As of 2010, subsequent to the Bribery Act 2010, the United Kingdom does not recognize the legality of facilitating payments. The OECD notes that the UK is unlikely to prosecute for minor facilitating payments in the areas where it is a common practice. The Ministry of Justice guidance confirms that prosecutors will exercise discretion in determining whether to prosecute. In addition, informal guidance received from the Serious Fraud Office indicate that where it is considering action, it will be guided by the following six principles:

- Whether the company has a clear and issued policy.
- Whether the company has written guidance available to employees as to the procedures they must follow where a facilitation payment is requested or expected.
- Whether such procedures are really being followed (monitoring).
- Evidence that gifts are being recorded at the company.
- Proper action, collective or otherwise, to inform the appropriate authorities in countries when a breach of the policy occurs.
- The company is taking what practical steps it can to curtail such payments.

=== United States ===
Within the United States federal legislation, a facilitating payment or grease payment, as defined by the Foreign Corrupt Practices Act (FCPA) of 1977 and clarified in its 1988 amendments, is a payment to a foreign official, political party or party official for "routine governmental action", such as processing papers, issuing permits, and other actions of an official, in order to expedite performance of duties of non-discretionary nature, i.e., which they are already bound to perform. The payment is not intended to influence the outcome of the official's action, only its timing. Facilitation payments are one of the few exceptions from anti-bribery prohibitions of the law.

==== Evolution of the notion ====
Prior to the 1988 amendments, the exclusion of "grease payments" was via the definition of the "foreign official", which did not include persons without discretionary (decision-making) duties, e.g., ones with clerical functions. The major drawback of this approach is that often it is difficult to properly identify the scope of duties of a foreign official. The 1988 amendment eliminated this drawback by placing the emphasis on the purpose of the payment rather than on the duties of the recipient. At the same time, the scope of the "routine governmental actions" in question was made sufficiently narrow and supplied with detailed examples.

== See also ==
- Baksheesh
- Fakelaki
