= Criminal Justice Administration Act 1962 =

Act of the Parliament of the United Kingdom

Criminal Justice Administration Act 1962 (Note: Section 21(1).)
- Act of Parliament
- Parliament of the United Kingdom
- Long title: An Act to provide for the appointment of additional puisne judges of the High Court, of assistant clerks of assize and of a sheriff for part of the West Riding of York; to amend the law relating to courts of quarter sessions and to the administration of criminal justice in England and Wales; and for purposes connected with those matters.
- Citation: 10 & 11 Eliz. 2. c. 15
- Territorial extent: England and Wales (Note: Section 21(4).)

Dates
- Royal assent: 29 March 1962
- Commencement: 29 March 1962 (Note: The Acts of Parliament (Commencement) Act 1793.)
- Repealed: 21 May 1981

Other legislation
- Amends: Night Poaching Act 1828; Criminal Justice Administration Act 1851
- Amended by: Criminal Law Act 1967; Theft Act 1968; Justices of the Peace Act 1968; Courts Act 1971; Statute Law (Repeals) Act 1974; Statute Law (Repeals) Act 1978; Forgery and Counterfeiting Act 1981
- Repealed by: Statute Law (Repeals) Act 1981

Status: Repealed

Text of statute as originally enacted

The Criminal Justice Administration Act 1962 (10 & 11 Eliz. 2. c. 15) was an act of the Parliament of the United Kingdom that modified the jurisdiction and process of the English criminal courts.

== Provisions ==
The act was introduced in reaction to the report of the Streatfeild Committee on the Business of the Criminal Courts, which recommended changes to speed up criminal trials and reduce the long waiting times between hearings and trials. The Criminal Justice Administration Bill received strong support in both the House of Commons and House of Lords, allowing it to examine a variety of criminal justice problems. The Act was finally repealed in 1981 by the Statute Law (Repeals) Act 1981.

Section 1 of the act increased the number of judges in the High Court of Justice from 48 to 53. 3 of the new judges were immediately assigned to the Queen's Bench Division, with the remaining two assigned to the Probate, Divorce and Admiralty Division. This provision sparked off debate in Parliament about the system of judicial appointments, particularly whether the increasing number of judges meant a dilution of the quality of the source (barristers) and if allowing solicitors to become members of the senior judiciary would be a good idea. This debate went no further at the time, however, and the only other changes relating directly to the judiciary were to abolish the practice of making Recorders pay for their own deputies.

Section 4 of the act allowed for Quarter Sessions to sit continuously, not 4 times a year (once each "quarter"), although the minimum number of sitting remained as 4. This part of the act also abolished the Quarter Sessions Appeal Committee, with appeal work being handled by the Quarter Sessions alone. The act also allowed a chairman of a Quarter Session outside London to deal with a case on his own if no other judges were available, something intended to help in places like Kent where Quarter Sessions were almost permanently in session and the lay justices tended to lose their enthusiasm. The act also extended the jurisdiction of Quarter Sessions to cover bigamy, poaching and certain sexual offences, while magistrates' courts were given the ability to deal with certain burglary offences.

== Subsequent developments ==
Section 20(2) of, and schedule 5 to, the act were repealed by section 1 of, and part XI of the schedule to, the Statute Law (Repeals) Act 1974, which came into force on 27 June 1974.

The whole act was repealed by section 1(1) of, and part I of schedule 1 to, the Statute Law (Repeals) Act 1981, which came into force on 21 May 1981.

== Bibliography ==
- Dworkin, Gerald (1962). "Criminal Justice Administration Act, 1962". Modern Law Review. 25 (6). Blackwell Publishing. ISSN 0026-7961.
