= Criminal Justice Administration Act 1851 =

Act of the Parliament of the United Kingdom

Criminal Justice Administration Act 1851 (Note: The citation of this act by this short title was authorised by section 1 of, and the first schedule to, the Short Titles Act 1896. Due to the repeal of those provisions it is now authorised by section 19(2) of the Interpretation Act 1978.)
- Act of Parliament
- Parliament of the United Kingdom
- Long title: An Act to amend the Law relating to the Expences of Prosecutions, and to make further Provision for the Apprehension and Trial of Offenders, in certain Cases.
- Citation: 14 & 15 Vict. c. 55
- Territorial extent: England and Wales (Note: Section 25.)

Dates
- Royal assent: 1 August 1851
- Commencement: 1 August 1851 (Note: The Acts of Parliament (Commencement) Act 1793.)
Other legislation
Amends	Criminal Law Act 1826; Division of Counties Act 1828; Central Criminal Court Act 1834; Petty Sessional Divisions Act 1836z
Amended by	Criminal Law Act 1826; Middlesex Sessions Act 1874; Statute Law Revision Act 1875; Statute Law Revision Act 1892; Costs in Criminal Cases Act 1908; Justices of the Peace Act 1949; Statute Law Revision Act 1950; Magistrates' Courts Act 1952; Criminal Justice Administration Act 1962; Criminal Law Act 1967

Status: Partially repealed

Text of statute as originally enacted

Revised text of statute as amended

Text of the Criminal Justice Administration Act 1851 as in force today (including any amendments) within the United Kingdom, from legislation.gov.uk.

The Criminal Justice Administration Act 1851 (14 & 15 Vict. c. 55) is an act of the Parliament of the United Kingdom.

== Provisions ==
Section 4 of the act repealed section 26 of the Criminal Law Act 1826 (7 Geo. 4. c. 64).

=== Section 18 - Indorsement of warrants in the Channel Islands ===
...the Bailiffs of Jersey and Guernsey respectively, or in their absence the lieutenant bailiffs of such islands respectively, within their respective bailiwicks or jurisdictions, the judge of Alderney, or in his absence any jurat of such island, within such island, and the seneschal of Sark, or in his absence his deputy, within such island, shall have all such power and authority to indorse warrants as by the said Acts respectively is given or expressed or intended to be given to any officer of such isles having jurisdiction to issue any warrant or process in the nature of a warrant for the apprehension of offenders, and for such purpose shall have authority to administer an oath; and all the provisions of the said Acts shall be construed as if the officers authorised to indorse warrants by this enactment had been so authorised by the said section of the Indictable Offences Act 1848.

The words at the start were repealed by section 1 of, and the schedule to, the Statute Law Revision Act 1892 (55 & 56 Vict. c. 19), which came into force on 20 June 1892.

==== "The said Acts" ====
This expression refers to section 13 of the Indictable Offences Act 1848 (11 & 12 Vict. c. 42) and the former section 3 of the Summary Jurisdiction Act 1848 (c. 43).

==== "The said section of the Indictable Offences Act 1848" ====
This expression refers to section 13 of that act.

See also Bailiff of Jersey and Bailiff of Guernsey.

== Subsequent developments ==
Section 14 of the act was repealed by section 5 of, and schedule 2 to, the Middlesex Sessions Act 1874 (37 & 38 Vict. c. 7), which came into force on 21 May 1874.

Section 1, 3, 4, 17 and 22 of the act was repealed by section 1 of, and the schedule to, the Statute Law Revision Act 1875 (38 & 39 Vict. c. 66), which came into force on 11 August 1875.

Sections 20 and 21 of the act were repealed by section 1 of, and the schedule to, the Statute Law Revision Act 1892 (55 & 56 Vict. c. 19), which came into force on 20 June 1892.

Section 2 of the act was repealed by section 10 of, and the schedule to, the Costs in Criminal Cases Act 1908 (8 Edw. 7. c. 15), which came into force on 1 January 1909.

Sections 15 and 16 of the act were repealed by section 1(1) of, and the first schedule to, the Statute Law Revision Act 1950 (14 Geo. 6. c. 6), which came into force on 23 May 1950.

Section 12 of the act was repealed by section 132(1) of, and schedule 6 to, the Magistrates' Courts Act 1952 (15 & 16 Geo. 6 & 1 Eliz. 2. c. 55).

Sections 9–11 of the act were repealed by section 20(2) of, and part I of schedule 5 to, the Criminal Justice Administration Act 1962 (10 & 11 Eliz. 2. c. 15), which came into force on 29 March 1962.

Sections 5–7, 19 and 23–25 of the act were repealed by section 10(2) of, and part I of schedule 3 to, the Criminal Law Act 1967, which came into force on 1 January 1968.

Section 13 of the act was repealed by section 10(2) of, and part II of schedule 3 to, the Criminal Law Act 1967, which came into force on 1 January 1968.

== See also ==
- Criminal Justice Act
