= Baksheesh =

Type of charitable giving or bribery

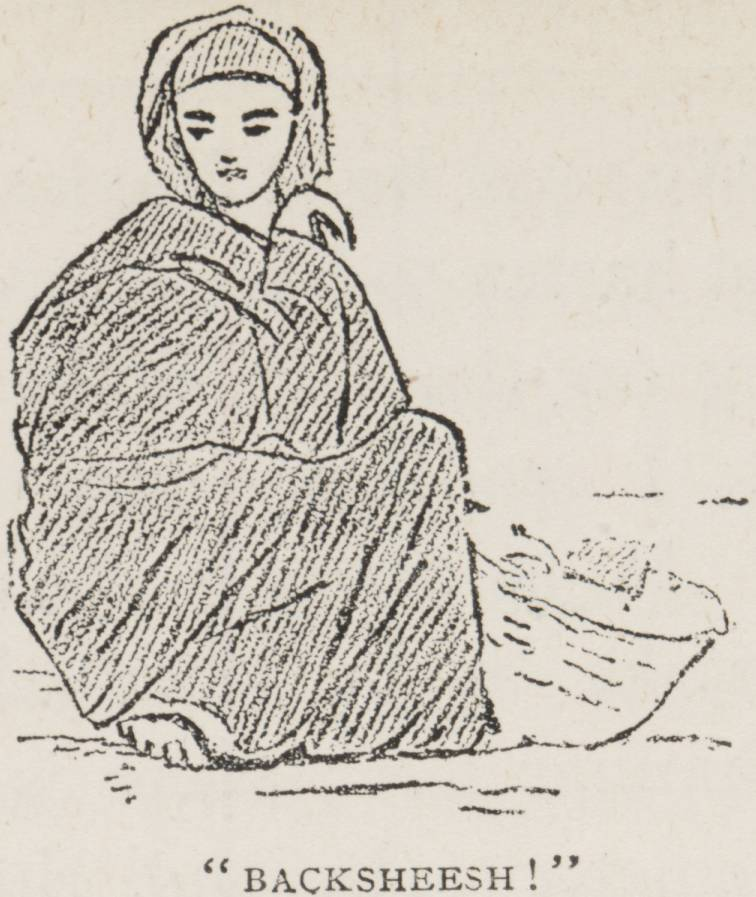
Drawing of a female beggar holding a large bowl, 1879

Baksheesh (from Persian: بخشش bakhshesh) may have different meanings in different languages and countries including tipping, charitable giving, or bribery.

== Etymology ==
Baksheesh comes from the Persian word بخشش (bakhshesh), which originated from the Middle Persian language.

The word had also moved to other cultures and countries.

== In literature ==
When American mythologist Joseph Campbell travelled on his maiden visit to India in 1954, he encountered pervasive begging which he called the "Baksheesh Complex".

Mark Twain, after riding through the Biblical town of Magdala in 1867, makes note of his encounter with beggars and the term bucksheesh in his published work The Innocents Abroad: "They hung to the horses' tails, clung to their manes and the stirrups, closed in on every side in scorn of dangerous hoofs—and out of their infidel throats, with one accord, burst an agonizing and most infernal chorus: 'Howajji, bucksheesh! howajji, bucksheesh! howajji, bucksheesh! bucksheesh! bucksheesh!' I never was in a storm like that before."

Leo Deuel, a writer on archaeology, sardonically described baksheesh as "lavish remuneration and bribes, rudely demanded but ever so graciously accepted by the natives in return for little or no services rendered".

== See also ==
- Fakelaki, "little envelope"
- Facilitating payment
