= Costs in Criminal Cases Act 1908 =

Act of the Parliament of the United Kingdom

Costs in Criminal Cases Act 1908 (Note: Section 10(3).)
- Act of Parliament
- Parliament of the United Kingdom
- Long title: An Act to consolidate and amend the Law relating to the Payment of Costs in Criminal Cases.
- Citation: 8 Edw. 7. c. 15
- Territorial extent: England and Wales (Note: Section 10(4).)

Dates
- Royal assent: 1 August 1908
- Commencement: 1 January 1909 (Note: Section 10(2).)
- Repealed: 1 January 1953
Other legislation
Amends	See § Repealed enactments
Repeals/revokes	See § Repealed enactments
Amended by	Representation of the People Act 1949
Repealed by	Costs in Criminal Cases Act 1952

Status: Repealed

Text of statute as originally enacted

The Costs in Criminal Cases Act 1908 (8 Edw. 7. c. 15) was an act of the Parliament of the United Kingdom that consolidated and amended the law relating to the payment of costs in criminal cases in England and Wales.

== Provisions ==
=== Repealed enactments ===
Section 10 of the act repealed 35 enactments, listed in the schedule to the act.

Citation	Short title	Extent of repeal
38 Geo. 3 c. 52	Counties of Cities Act 1798	The words “the expenses of the prosecution and of the witnesses and of” in section eight.
5 Geo. 4 c. 83	Vagrancy Act 1824	Section nine, from “and the justices of the peace” to “allowed the same in his account.”
7 Geo. 4 c. 64	Criminal Law Act 1826	Sections twenty-two, twenty-three, twenty-four, and twenty-five.
4 & 5 Will. 4 c. 36	Central Criminal Court Act 1834	Section twelve.
5 & 6 Will. 4 c. 50	Highway Act 1835	Section ninety-five, from “and the costs” to “shall be situate” and section ninety-eight.
1 & 2 Vict. c. 82	Parkhurst Prison Act 1838	Section fourteen, from “and the expenses” to the end of the section.
6 & 7 Vict. c. 96	Libel Act 1843	Section eight.
11 & 12 Vict. c. 12	Treason Felony Act 1848	Section ten.
13 & 14 Vict. c. 101	Poor Law Amendment Act 1850	Section nine, from “and shall” to the end of the section.
14 & 15 Vict. c. 19	Prevention of Offences Act 1851	Section fourteen.
14 & 15 Vict. c. 55	Criminal Justice Administration Act 1851	Section two. Section five, from “to prosecutors” to “prosecutions and,” and from “and also” to “certificates relate.” Section six, from “payment to any prosecutor” to “loss of time, or order,” and from “and where” to the end of the section.
17 & 18 Vict. c. 102	Corrupt Practices Prevention Act 1854	Section ten, from the beginning of the section down to “provided always that,” and sections twelve and thirteen.
24 & 25 Vict. c. 96	Larceny Act 1861	Section one hundred and twenty-one.
24 & 25 Vict. c. 97	Malicious Damage Act 1861	Section seventy-seven.
24 & 25 Vict. c. 98	Forgery Act 1861	Section fifty-four.
24 & 25 Vict. c. 99	Coinage Offences Act 1861	Section forty-two.
24 & 25 Vict. c. 100	Offences against the Person Act 1861	Sections seventy-four, seventy-five, and seventy-seven.
25 & 26 Vict. c. 61	Highway Act 1862	Section nineteen, from “and the costs” to the end of the section.
30 & 31 Vict. c. 35	Criminal Law Amendment Act 1867	Sections two and five.
32 & 33 Vict. c. 62	Debtors Act 1869	Section seventeen.
32 & 33 Vict. c. 89	Clerks of Assize, &c. Act 1869	Sections nine, ten, and eleven.
33 & 34 Vict. c. 23	Forfeiture Act 1870	Section three.
35 & 36 Vict. c. 33	Ballot Act 1872	Section twenty-four from “and the costs” to “in cases of felony.”
42 & 43 Vict. c. 49	Summary Jurisdiction Act 1879	In subsection (1) of section seventeen, the words “and the expenses of the prosecution shall be payable as in cases of felony.” Section twenty-eight except so far as that section is applied by section one of the Inebriates Act 1899, or any other Act.
45 & 46 Vict. c. 50	Municipal Corporations Act 1882	The word “prosecution” in section one hundred and fifty-one, and section one hundred and sixty-nine.
46 & 47 Vict. c. 51	Corrupt and Illegal Practices Prevention Act 1883	The words “twelve and thirteen” in section fifty-three, and subsection (2) of section fifty-seven.
48 & 49 Vict. c. 69	Criminal Law Amendment Act 1885	Section eighteen.
50 & 51 Vict. c. 28	Merchandise Marks Act 1887	Section fourteen.
51 & 52 Vict. c. 41	Local Government Act 1888	The words “and all costs of prosecutions mentioned in section one hundred and sixty-nine of the Municipal Corporations Act, 1882, shall be paid out of the county fund” in subsection (5) of section thirty-five. Section sixty-seven, from “and the county council” to the end of the section. The words “but nothing shall require a quarter sessions borough to contribute towards the costs of prosecutions at assizes except in the case of persons committed for trial from the borough” in section one hundred.
52 & 53 Vict. c. 52	Official Secrets Act 1889	Section four.
52 & 53 Vict. c. 69	Public Bodies Corrupt Practices Act 1889	Section five.
57 & 58 Vict. c. 60	Merchant Shipping Act 1894	Section seven hundred and one.
3 Edw. 7 c. 38	Poor Prisoners Defence Act 1903	Subsection (2) of section one.
4 Edw. 7 c. 15	Prevention of Cruelty to Children Act 1904	Section twenty.
6 Edw. 7 c. 34	Prevention of Corruption Act 1906	Subsection (4) of section two.

== Subsequent developments ==
The whole act was repealed by section 18(1) of, and the schedule to, the Costs in Criminal Cases Act 1952 (15 & 16 Geo. 6 & 1 Eliz. 2. c. 48), which came into force on 1 January 1953.
