= International Anti-Bribery Act of 1998 =

United States federal legislation

The International Anti-Bribery and Fair Competition Act of 1998 (Pub. L. 105–366 (text) (PDF), 112 Stat. 3302, enacted November 10, 1998) is a United States federal law that amends the Foreign Corrupt Practices Act by implementing the provisions of the Organisation for Economic Co-operation and Development's Convention on Combating Bribery of Foreign Public Officials in International Business Transactions.

The act makes it illegal for a citizen or corporation of the United States or a person or corporation acting within the United States to influence, bribe or seek an advantage from a public official of another country.

== See also ==
- Convention against Corruption (disambiguation)
