= Public Bodies Corrupt Practices Act 1889 =

Act of the Parliament of the United Kingdom

Public Bodies Corrupt Practice Act 1889 (Note: Section 10.)
- Act of Parliament
- Parliament of the United Kingdom
- Long title: An Act for the more effectual Prevention and Punishment of Bribery and Corruption of and by Members, Officers, or Servants of Corporations, Councils, Boards, Commissions, or other Public Bodies.
- Citation: 52 & 53 Vict. c. 69
- Territorial extent: United Kingdom

Dates
- Royal assent: 30 August 1889
- Commencement: 30 August 1889 (Note: The Acts of Parliament (Commencement) Act 1793.)
- Repealed: United Kingdom: 1 July 2011 (Note: The Bribery Act 2010 (Commencement) Order 2011.); Republic of Ireland: 30 July 2018 (Note: The Criminal Justice (Corruption Offences) Act 2018 (Commencement) Order 2018.)
Other legislation
Amended by	Costs in Criminal Cases Act 1908; Criminal Law Act 1967; Criminal Justice Act 1988; Anti-terrorism, Crime and Security Act 2001
Repealed by	United Kingdom: Bribery Act 2010; Republic of Ireland: Criminal Justice (Corruption Offences) Act 2018

Status: Repealed

Text of statute as originally enacted

Revised text of statute as amended

The Public Bodies Corrupt Practices Act 1889 (52 & 53 Vict. c. 69) was an act of the Parliament of the United Kingdom of Great Britain and Ireland (as it was then). It was one of the Prevention of Corruption Acts 1889 to 1916, a collective title adopted in 1916.

The act made the active or passive bribery of a member, officer or servant of a public body a criminal offence.

Specifically, the act prohibited a person covered by the act, whether by himself, or in conjunction with any other person, from corruptly soliciting or receiving, or agreeing to receive, for himself, or any other person, any gift, loan, fee, reward or advantage whatever as an inducement to, or reward for, doing or forbearing to do anything in respect of any matter or transaction whatsoever, actual or proposed, in which the public body is concerned. A person may also not corruptly promise, or offer, any gift, loan, fee, reward, or advantage whatsoever, to any person, whether for the benefit of that person, or of another person, as an inducement to or reward for doing or forbearing to do anything in respect of any matter or transaction whatsoever, actual or proposed; in which the public body is concerned.

Offences under the act required the consent of the attorney general to proceed with a prosecution. In relation to offences created by the act, the burden of proof was on the defendant to show (on the balance of probabilities) that the money, gift, or other consideration was not received corruptly.

In March 2006, the Metropolitan Police confirmed that, following complaints by the Scottish National Party and others, they were investigating possible breaches of the act. A total of £14 million in loans was given by wealthy individuals to Labour during the 2005 general election campaign and four of these men were subsequently nominated for Life Peerages. (See main article Cash for Peerages.)

== Subsequent developments ==
Section 6 of the act was repealed for England and Wales by section 10(2) of, and part II of schedule 3 to, the Criminal Law Act 1967, which came into force on 1 January 1968.

Section 3 was repealed by the Criminal Justice Act 1988 and the entire act was repealed by the coming into force of the Bribery Act 2010.

== See also ==
- Prevention of Corruption Act
