= Streatfeild Committee on the Business of the Criminal Courts =

The Streatfeild Committee on the Business of the Criminal Courts was a British committee set up to investigate the workings and process of the criminal courts in England and Wales. Its report and recommendations led directly to the Criminal Justice Administration Act 1962.

== Committee and Report ==
The committee was established in June 1958, and was given the job of reviewing "the present arrangements in England and Wales (a) for bringing to trial persons charged with criminal offences and (b) for providing the courts with the information necessary to enable them to select the most appropriate treatment for offenders". The Committee consisted of nine people, including (as well as lawyers) sociologists and psychologists. Their report was made in 1961.

The report discussed the long process of criminal trials, concluding that it was due to the large number of cases and slow processes in every part of the criminal courts. A Home Office Research Unit attached to the Committee showed that 5,000 criminal cases a year (almost a quarter of the total number) had to wait at least eight weeks for a criminal trial, with 400 of those waiting at least sixteen weeks. Their recommendations fell into two categories; jurisdictional reform and reorganisation of the courts. The major recommendation was that many burglary and theft offences, such as breaking and entering with a view to steal, should be tried as summary cases at the magistrates' courts. As well as other minor extensions to the Magistrates' jurisdiction, the Report also recommended allowing Quarter Sessions to try more cases. In terms of reorganisation, the Report proposed that Quarter Sessions sit permanently rather than four times a year, allowing them to get through a greater number of cases.

== Bibliography ==
- Williams, J.E. (1961). "Report of the Interdepartmental Committee on the Business of the Criminal Courts". Modern Law Review. 24 (3). Blackwell Publishing. ISSN 0026-7961.
