= Data room =

Spaces used for housing data

Data rooms are secure spaces used for housing data, usually of a privileged or confidential nature. They can be physical data rooms, virtual data rooms (VDRs), or data centers. They are primarily used for a variety of corporate purposes, including data storage, document exchange, file sharing, financial transactions, and legal proceedings. Today, data rooms are central to workflows in mergers and acquisitions, venture capital, and corporate restructuring, increasingly utilizing artificial intelligence to securely manage and review large datasets.

Historically, data rooms were strictly physical locations heavily guarded and monitored. Today, the vast majority of corporate data rooms are hosted virtually on secure cloud platforms, though physical rooms are still occasionally used for highly sensitive government or proprietary intelligence.

== Physical Data Rooms ==
In mergers and acquisitions (M&A), the traditional data room genuinely consists of a physically secured and continually monitored room, normally in the vendor's offices or those of their legal counsel. Bidders and their advisers visit this room in order to inspect and report on various documents, legal contracts, and financial statements made available during the due diligence process.

Historically, physical data rooms presented significant logistical challenges. Often, only one bidder at a time was allowed to enter to maintain document integrity and confidentiality. If new documents or new versions of documents were required, they had to be brought in by courier as hardcopies. Teams involved in large due diligence processes typically had to be flown in from many regions or countries and remain available throughout the process. Because these teams comprised a number of experts in different fields—such as legal counsel, forensic accountants, and industry specialists—the overall cost of keeping such groups on call near the physical data room was often extremely high.

== Virtual Data Rooms (VDRs) ==
To address the costs and logistical bottlenecks of physical data rooms, virtual data rooms (VDRs) were developed to provide secure, online dissemination of confidential information. A VDR is essentially a secure cloud repository with strictly controlled access. Access is managed through secure log-ons supplied by the vendor or authority, which can be disabled at any time if a bidder withdraws from a transaction.

Because much of the information released during corporate transactions is highly confidential, VDRs utilize digital rights management (DRM) to control information. Restrictions are applied to the viewers' ability to release data to third parties by disabling forwarding, copying, or printing capabilities. Modern VDRs also employ dynamic watermarking and detailed auditing capabilities. Detailed auditing is required for legal reasons so that a precise digital footprint is kept of who has viewed which version of each document, and for how long. Furthermore, modern VDR platforms are typically built to comply with stringent information security standards such as ISO 27001 and SOC 2.

Transitioning from sequential physical data rooms to parallel virtual data rooms has been shown to significantly reduce the duration of M&A transactions while allowing sellers to field multiple bidders simultaneously.

== Key Applications ==
Data rooms are commonly used by legal, accounting, investment banking, and private equity firms. Primary applications include:

- Mergers and Acquisitions (M&A): VDRs are central to the sell-side M&A process. After potential buyers sign a Non-Disclosure Agreement (NDA) and review a Confidential Information Memorandum (CIM), they are granted data room access to perform deep financial due diligence, such as Quality of Earnings (QoE) analysis and legal liability assessments.
- Venture Capital and Startups: Startups use data rooms as a centralized location for key operational data, capitalization tables, and financial projections to streamline due diligence for angel investors and venture capital firms during fundraising rounds.
- Initial Public Offerings (IPOs): Taking a company public requires intense regulatory scrutiny. Data rooms are used to securely share company histories and financial audits with investment bankers, legal teams, and regulatory bodies.
- Corporate Restructuring and Insolvency: During bankruptcies or corporate carve-outs, data rooms are used to organize outstanding debt profiles, creditor agreements, and operational liabilities.

== Emerging Technologies ==
In recent years, the management of virtual data rooms has increasingly incorporated Artificial Intelligence (AI) and Machine Learning (ML). Generative AI and Natural Language Processing (NLP) tools are now integrated into VDRs to automatically index thousands of documents, perform auto-redaction of personally identifiable information (PII), and assist buy-side analysts in identifying hidden liabilities within unstructured text data during the due diligence phase. Modern AI algorithms can extract line items from financial statements to instantly populate structured databases.

== See also ==
- Information security
- Software as a service
