= Joseph Sigelman =

American businessman (born 1971)

- Born: February 6, 1971 (age 55); New York City, United States
- Education: Princeton University (BA); Harvard Business School (MBA)
- Years active: 1999–present
- Children: 2
- Website: www.joesigelman.com

Joseph Sigelman (born February 6, 1971) is an American businessman. He is a co-founder of AG&P Group and ex-CEO of OfficeTiger.

== Early life and education ==
Joseph Sigelman was born on February 6, 1971, in New York City, in the United States. He is a graduate of Princeton University's Woodrow Wilson School of Public and International Affairs, and he went on to receive his MBA from Harvard Business School, during which time he worked as a summer intern at Goldman Sachs in London. Sigelman is married and has two children, who were both born in the Philippines.

== Career ==
Sigelman started his career in investment banking with Lazard Frères & Co. and later worked in private equity at the London offices of Goldman Sachs, where he had interned during his studies. In 1999, Sigelman and his friend and business partner Randy Altschuler, who was his classmate at Princeton University, started their first business called OfficeTiger.

=== Early career ===
By 2004, OfficeTiger had over 2,000 employees and operated in both the US and the UK. In 2006, the company was perhaps one of the first businesses worldwide to engage in business process outsourcing in India. OfficeTiger was sold to RR Donnelley & Sons in a US$250 million cash sale.

Sigelman then started a new company, PetroTiger Ltd, a British Virgin Islands oil and gas company with operations in Colombia and offices in New Jersey.

In 2013, Sigelman was prosecuted for corruption charges in relation to dealings between PetroTiger and Colombian officials that allegedly violated the Foreign Corrupt Practices Act. In 2015, the charges were downgraded and some were dropped; Sigelman pleaded guilty to a single offence and was fined $100,000.

=== Atlantic Gulf & Pacific ===
In 2010, along with a group of shareholders, Sigelman led the acquisition of a Philippines-based business, Atlantic Gulf & Pacific (AG&P Group). AG&P is a major construction and engineering company which was acquired in 2010 and reoriented to be an import and distribution company for liquefied natural gas.

Since the acquisition of AG&P, Sigelman has led growth of over US$300 million in equity infusions and the expansion of the company across the Asia-Pacific region, including the acquisition of the Korean gas company Gas Entec.

Sigelman was a World Economic Forum Young Global Leader, a Businessweek Star of Asia, and the Asia CEO Expat Executive of the Year. He is a life member of the Council on Foreign Relations.
