= Virtual data room =

Online repository of information

A virtual data room (sometimes called a VDR or Deal Room) is an online repository of information that is used for the storing and distribution of documents. In many cases, a virtual data room is used to facilitate the due diligence process during an M&A transaction, loan syndication, or private equity and venture capital transactions. This due diligence process has traditionally used a physical data room to accomplish the disclosure of documents. For reasons of cost, efficiency and security, virtual data rooms have widely replaced the more traditional physical data room.

A virtual data room is an extranet to which the bidders and their advisers are given access via the internet. An extranet is essentially a website with limited controlled access, using a secure log-on supplied by the vendor, which can be disabled at any time, by the vendor, if a bidder withdraws. Much of the information released is confidential and restrictions are applied to the viewer's ability to release this to third parties (by means of forwarding, copying or printing). This can be effectively applied to protect the data using digital rights management.

The virtual data room provides access to secure documents for authorized users through a dedicated web site, or through secure agent applications.

In the process of mergers and acquisitions the data room is set up as part of the central repository of data relating to companies or divisions being acquired or sold. The data room enables the interested parties to view information relating to the business in a controlled environment where confidentiality can be preserved. Conventionally this was achieved by establishing a supervised, physical data room in secure premises with controlled access. In most cases, with a physical data room, only one bidder team can access the room at a time. A virtual data room is designed to have the same advantages as a conventional data room (controlling access, viewing, copying and printing, etc.) with fewer disadvantages. Due to their increased efficiency, many businesses and industries have moved to using virtual data rooms instead of physical data rooms. In 2006, a spokesperson for a company which sets up virtual deal rooms was reported claiming that the process reduced the bidding process by about thirty days compared to physical data rooms.

In the process of startup fundraising, a virtual data room is set up to be a central location for key data, documents, and financials. These are shared with venture capital and angel investors and allows them to streamline due diligence.

== Application ==
Any business dealing with private data can apply VDRs when secure transaction processing is required. This includes financial institutions that need to negotiate confidential customer information without involving third parties. VDRs have traditionally been used for IPOs and real estate asset management. Technology companies may use them to exchange and review code or confidential data needed for operations. The same is true for clients, who entrust their valuable code only to the most qualified people in the organisation. The code is not something that can be printed out and brought in a folder. It resides on a computer and must be used together.

VDR can find application in any business that manages data in the form of documents, especially law firms, financial advisers or the B2B sector. The latter work with documents that must always be handled and controlled confidentially, and it is difficult to store them securely when they are on a server that other people can access. In addition, in B2B, it is important to close the deal as quickly as possible: the average sales cycle is one to three months. VDR can be compared to a locked filing cabinet where all those folders and documents are kept. It automates the mathematics of pricing to prevent revenue leakage, and initially integrates CRM to ensure accurate synchronisation of all account data, which is important for B2B in particular and sales in general.

While virtual data rooms offer many advantages, they are not suitable for every industry. For example, some governments may decide to continue using physical data rooms for highly confidential information sharing. The damage from potential cyberattacks and data breaches exceeds the benefits offered by virtual data rooms. In such cases, the use of VDRs is not considered. Data breaches have particularly affected the US healthcare system from March 2021 to March 2022 - according to IBM Security the cost of the breach was a record high of $10.1 million.
