= Convention against Corruption =

Convention against Corruption could refer to:

- The United Nations Convention against Corruption of the United Nations, in force since 14 December 2005.
- The Inter-American Convention against Corruption of the Organization of American States, in force since 6 March 1997.
- The Civil Law Convention on Corruption of the Council of Europe, adopted 4 November 1999.
- The Criminal Law Convention on Corruption of the Council of Europe, adopted 27 January 1999.
- The EU Convention against Corruption involving officials of the European Union, adopted on 25 June 1997.
- The African Union Convention on Preventing and Combating Corruption, adopted in 2003.
- The OECD Anti-Bribery Convention
