= Fakelaki =

Greek for "little envelope," referring to corruption

Fakelaki or fakellaki is the phonetic transliteration of the Greek word φακελάκι. It means "little envelope" but is also used in Greek popular culture as a jargon term referring to the bribery of public servants and private companies by Greek citizens in order to "expedite" service. According to this practice, sums of money are stuffed in files and passed across the desk to secure appointments, documents approval and permits.

== Dynamics ==
The Greek term "fakelaki" is close to the notion of tip in meaning, but it may also refer to specific tariffs demanded by government officials to bypass procedure. As of mid-2011, one in four employed Greeks worked for the government.

Fakelaki is also connected to a work culture that perceives the various documents issued by authorities (for example a driving license) as "papers" needed to pay a price "to buy". Fakelaki is illegal, but its continuing presence in Greek life remains a problem.

== Extent ==
Transparency International, an independent corruption monitoring NGO, found that 13% of Greeks paid fakelaki, bribery in the form of envelopes with cash donations, in 2009, which was estimated to account for €787 million in yearly corruption payments. At the same time, it was estimated that roughly €1 billion was paid by companies in bribes to public institutions for avoiding bureaucratic rules or to get other benefits.

When all sorts of corruption in Greece are calculated, the total amount is estimated to be roughly €3.5 billion per year (equal to 1.75% of the Greek GDP). Compared with corruption levels measured by Transparency International for 160 other countries, Greece ranked at 49th in 2004, was down at 57th in 2008, and slumped to 71st place in 2009. The government elected in October 2009 had on its agenda to increase the fight against fakelaki and other forms of corruption.

In 2012, the website edosafakelaki ("I paid a bribe" in Greek) was created for Greek citizens to anonymously report the payment of fakelaki. The site received over 1,000 reports in its first month of operation. The website was created after its founder, Kristina Tremonti, was forced to pay a fakelaki on behalf of her 90-year-old grandfather, a war veteran with terminal cancer, who was left waiting for hours in the emergency room of a public hospital.

== See also ==
- Tax evasion and corruption in Greece
- Baksheesh
