= Caracal Energy =

Caracal Energy plc
- Company type: Public limited company
- Industry: Oil exploration and development
- Founded: 2008
- Headquarters: Calgary, Alberta
- Key people: Robert Hodgins (Chairman); Gary Guidry (CEO)
- Revenue: £27.2 million (2013)
- Operating income: £(84.5) million (2013)
- Net income: £(84.2) million (2013)
- Website: www.caracalenergy.com

Caracal Energy plc is a Canadian oil exploration and development business with operations in Chad. It was acquired by Glencore in 2014.

== History ==
The company was formed by Brad Griffiths as Griffiths Energy International Inc in 2009. After Brad Griffiths was killed in a boating accident in 2011, the company changed its name to Caracal Energy.

In 2013 the company was fined C$10.35 million after allegedly making improper payments to the wife of Chad's ambassador to Canada.

In April 2014 Glencore made an offer to buy the company.

== Operations ==
The company has oil exploration and development operations in Chad.
