= Earnings quality =

Degree to which a firm's reported earnings reflect economic performance

In accounting, earnings quality, also known as quality of earnings (QoE), refers to the ability of a firm's reported earnings (net profit/income) to predict its future cash flows. It is an assessment criterion for how "repeatable, controllable and bankable" a firm's earnings are, amongst other factors, and has variously been defined as the degree to which earnings reflect underlying economic effects, are better estimates of cash flows, are conservative, or are predictable.

== Rationale ==
The concept of earnings quality has roots in the judgmental nature of accounting, which can be seen in the fact the different parties may interpret the economics underlying a transaction differently, and different firms may have different business characteristics.

=== Interpretation of underlying economics ===
The interpretation of the economics underlying a transaction and even the wording of the accounting standards can vary between firms. This, along with the fact that a firm's financial statements are the responsibility of the firm's management, allows management to structure transactions to achieve desired accounting results, by choosing an interpretation of the economics underlying the transactions that may be different from another party's. This use of judgment by management thus increases the chances that the earnings presented in a firm's financial statements may have been manipulated.

=== Differing business characteristics ===
Furthermore, the fact that firms have different fundamental business characteristics increases the possibility of error in or manipulation of presented earnings. For example, companies that operate in different industries may use a given machine for entirely different purposes or wear out a given machine at dramatically different rates, which makes it appropriate to allow management to choose between alternative depreciation methods and useful lives to be applied to the use of the machine. This discretion, however, increases the possibility for firms to make both honest mistakes, such as the accidental use of a wrong useful life, or to manipulate earnings.

=== Earnings quality and ways to lower it ===
The above factors lead to investors needing to assess the extent to which a firm's reported earnings are free from mistake or manipulation, i.e. the quality of the firm's earnings.

Other ways accounting choices can lower a firm's earnings quality include

- Recording revenue too soon or of questionable quality,
- Recording fictitious revenue,
- Boosting income with one-time gains,
- Shifting current expense to a different period,
- Failing to record or improperly reducing liabilities,
- Shifting current revenue to a later period, and
- Shifting future expenses to the current period as a special charge

== Assessing earnings quality ==
While the criteria for earnings to be considered high-quality differs between authors, sustainability of earnings may be the underlying concept.

=== Conservative accounting policies ===
Earnings quality has usually been associated with the use of conservative accounting policies. It has, however, been noted that conservatism in the current financial periods may allow aggressiveness in future financial periods. For example, choosing an "accelerated" depreciation method, or one that allocates a large amount of depreciation expense at the beginning of an asset's useful life, allows the firm to present abnormally high expenses for a given financial period and abnormally low expenses for future financial periods: conservatism, followed by aggressiveness. In other words, conservative decisions by management in a single period should not be used as sole proof of earnings quality.

=== Other factors ===
An assessment of earnings quality would therefore be based on other factors, such as

1. A correlation between reported earnings and underlying economic activity,
2. The permanence and sustainability of reported earnings,
3. The relationship between reported earnings and market valuation,
4. The extent and impact of discretionary accruals,
5. The transparency and completeness of disclosures,
6. The impact of low reported earnings on corporate image,
7. The company's handling of "bad news," and
8. The degree to which earnings are good estimates of cash flows.

=== Sustainability of earnings ===
One author claims, simply, that earnings are considered to be of high quality when they are sustainable.

=== Methods of assessment as conflicting ===
Different definitions of earnings quality, and hence the different methods of assessment, sometimes lead to contradictions between methods. For example, using only the criteria of correlation between reported earnings and underlying economic activity, accelerated depreciation may give rise to higher-quality earnings than straight-line depreciation, while the converse is true if one uses only the criteria of predictability of earnings.

== See also ==
- Accounting ethics
