= Yiping Zhou =

Yiping Zhou (周一平; born 1955) was the United Nations Envoy on South-South Cooperation. Prior to this appointment of 30 May 2014 by United Nations Secretary-General Ban Ki-moon, Zhou served as the Director of the United Nations Office for South-South Cooperation (UNOSSC), where he led UN system-wide promotion and coordination of South-South cooperation in the global South.

He is also the Editor-in-Chief of Cooperation South – a development journal of the United Nations Development Programme.

== Biography ==
Zhou has held a number of high-level positions with the United Nations. He served as deputy director and Senior Policy Adviser of the Special Unit for South-South Cooperation 1997–2004; Regional Programme Officer of UNDP's Regional Bureau for Asia and the Pacific (1992–1997); and Project Management Officer at the UN Office for Project Services (1985–1992).

Prior to joining the United Nations, Mr. Zhou worked as a policy officer in the Department of International Relations of the Ministry of Foreign Economic Relations and Trade of the Government of the People's Republic of China (1980–1984), and as diplomat in the Permanent Mission of China to the United Nations (1984–1985).
