= Bribery Act 2010 =

Act of the Parliament in the United Kingdom

Bribery Act 2010 (Note: Section 20.)
- Act of Parliament
- Parliament of the United Kingdom
- Long title: An Act to make provision about offences relating to bribery; and for connected purposes
- Citation: 2010 c. 23
- Introduced by: Jack Straw, Secretary of State for Justice (Commons); Lord Bach, Parliamentary Under-Secretary of State for Justice (Lords)
- Territorial extent: England and Wales; Scotland; Northern Ireland; (Note: Section 18.)

Dates
- Royal assent: 8 April 2010
- Commencement: 1 July 2011 (Note: Section 19. The Bribery Act 2010 (Commencement) Order 2011 (SI 2011/1418).)

Other legislation
- Amends: Housing Associations Act 1985; Criminal Justice Act 1988; Scotland Act 1998; International Criminal Court Act 2001; Anti-terrorism, Crime and Security Act 2001; Government of Wales Act 2006
- Repeals/revokes: Public Bodies Corrupt Practices Act 1889; Prevention of Corruption Act 1906; Prevention of Corruption Act 1916
- Amended by: Sentencing Act 2020; Economic Crime and Corporate Transparency Act 2023

Status: Current legislation

Text of statute as originally enacted

Revised text of statute as amended

Text of the Bribery Act 2010 as in force today (including any amendments) within the United Kingdom, from legislation.gov.uk.

The Bribery Act 2010 (c. 23) is an act of the Parliament of the United Kingdom that covers the criminal law relating to bribery. Introduced to Parliament in the Queen's Speech in 2009 after several decades of reports and draft bills, the act received royal assent on 8 April 2010 following cross-party support. Initially scheduled to enter into force in April 2010, this was changed to 1 July 2011. The act repeals all previous statutory and common law provisions in relation to bribery, instead replacing them with the crimes of bribery, being bribed, the bribery of foreign public officials, and the failure of a commercial organisation to prevent bribery on its behalf.

The penalties for committing a crime under the act are a maximum of 10 years' imprisonment, along with an unlimited fine, and the potential for the confiscation of property under the Proceeds of Crime Act 2002, as well as the disqualification of directors under the Company Directors Disqualification Act 1986. The act has a near-universal jurisdiction, allowing for the prosecution of an individual or company with links to the United Kingdom, regardless of where the crime occurred. It has been described as "the toughest anti-corruption legislation in the world".

== Background ==
Prior to the act, British anti-bribery law was based on the Public Bodies Corrupt Practices Act 1889, the Prevention of Corruption Act 1906 and the Prevention of Corruption Act 1916, a body of law described as "inconsistent, anachronistic and inadequate". Following the Poulson affair in 1972, the Salmon Committee on Standards in Public Life recommended updating and codifying these statutes, but the government of the time took no action. Similar suggestions were brought up in the first report of the Committee on Standards in Public Life established by John Major in 1994, and the Home Office published a draft consultation paper in 1997, discussing extending anti-bribery and anti-corruption law. This was followed by the Law Commission's report Legislating the Criminal Code: Corruption in 1998. The consultation paper and report coincided with mounting criticism from the Organisation for Economic Co-operation and Development, who felt that, despite the United Kingdom's ratification of the OECD Anti-Bribery Convention, its bribery laws were inadequate.

A draft Bribery Bill was announced in the 2002 Queen's Speech, but was rejected by the joint committee examining it. A second consultation paper was issued in 2005 examining the committee's concerns, before the government announced in March that "there was broad support for reform of the current law, but there was no consensus as to how this could be achieved". Following a white paper in March 2009, the Bribery Bill, based on the Law Commission's 2008 report Reforming Bribery, was announced in the Queen's Speech. Initially given all-party support after its introduction by Jack Straw in 2009, the bill was, according to The Guardian, subject to an attempted filibuster by Members of Parliament (MPs) from the Conservative Party. This followed pressure from the Confederation of British Industry, who worried that the bill in its original form would hamper the competitiveness of British industry.

The Bill was given Royal Assent on 8 April 2010, becoming the Bribery Act 2010, and was expected to come into force immediately. The government instead chose to hold several rounds of public consultations before announcing that it would come into force in April 2011. Following the publication of guidance by the Ministry of Justice, the act came into effect on 1 July 2011. The Ministry of Justice also released a Quick Start Guide, which highlights some key points of the act. The Quick Start Guide also suggests companies to consult relevant bodies for advice, including the UK Trade and Investment, and the government sponsored Business Anti-Corruption Portal. In October 2011, Munir Patel, a clerk at Redbridge Magistrates Court, became the first person to be convicted under the Bribery Act 2010, along with misconduct in a public office.

== Act ==
=== General bribery offences ===
Sections 1 to 5 of the act cover "general bribery offences". The crime of bribery is described in section 1 as occurring when a person offers, gives or promises to give a "financial or other advantage" to another individual in exchange for "improperly" performing a "relevant function or activity". Section 2 covers the offence of being bribed, which is defined as requesting, accepting or agreeing to accept such an advantage, in exchange for improperly performing such a function or activity. "Financial or other advantage" is not defined in the act, but, according to Aisha Anwar and Gavin Deeprose in the Scots Law Times, "could potentially encompass items such as contracts, non-monetary gifts and offers of employment". The "relevant function or activity" element is explained in section 3: it covers "any function of a public nature; any activity connected with a business, trade or profession; any activity performed in the course of a person's employment; or any activity performed by or on behalf of a body of persons whether corporate or unincorporated". This applies to both private and public industry, and encompasses activities performed outside the UK, even activities with no link to the country. The conditions attached are that the person performing the function could be expected to be performing it in good faith or with impartiality, or that an element of trust attaches to that person's role.

Under section 4, the activity will be considered to be "improperly" performed when the expectation of good faith or impartiality has been breached, or when the function has been performed in a way not expected of a person in a position of trust. Section 5 provides that the standard in deciding what would be expected is what a reasonable person in the UK might expect of a person in such a position. Where the breach has occurred in a jurisdiction outside the UK, local practices or customs should be disregarded when deciding this, unless they form part of the "written law" of the jurisdiction; "written law" is given to mean any constitution, statute or judicial opinion set down in writing. The general offences also cover situations where the mere acceptance of such an advantage would constitute improperly performing relevant functions or activities.

=== Bribery of foreign public officials ===
Bribery of foreign public officials is a distinct crime under section 6, in line with the OECD Anti-Bribery Convention. A person will be guilty of this offence if they promise, offer or give a financial or other advantage to a foreign public official, either directly or through a third party, where such an advantage is not legitimately due. A foreign public official is defined, under section 6(4), as "an individual holding legislative, administrative or judicial posts or anyone carrying out a public function for a foreign country or the country's public agencies or an official or agent of a public international organisation". The inclusion of "through a third party" is intended to prevent the use of go-betweens to avoid committing a crime, although if the written law of the country of the foreign public official allows or requires the official to accept the advantage offered, no crime will be committed. Unlike with general bribery offences, there is no requirement to show that the public official acted improperly as a result; this is a distinction between the act and the Anti-Bribery Convention. The offence under section 6 only applies to the briber, and not to the official who receives or agrees to receive such a bribe.

=== Failure of commercial organisations to prevent bribery ===
Section 7 creates the "broad and innovatory offence" of the failure of commercial organisations to prevent bribery on their behalf. This applies to all commercial organisations which have business in the UK. Unlike corporate manslaughter, this does not only apply to the organisation itself; individuals and employees may also be found guilty. The offence is one of strict liability, with no need to prove any kind of intention or positive action. It is also one of vicarious liability; a commercial organisation can be guilty of the offence if the bribery is carried out by an employee, an agent, a subsidiary, or another third party, as found in section 8. The location of the third party is irrelevant to the prosecution—according to David Aaronberg and Nichola Higgins in the Archbold Review, "therefore, a German business with retail outlets in the UK which pays a bribe in Spain could, in theory at least, face prosecution in the UK". Under section 7(2), the commercial organisation has a defence if it can show that, while bribery did take place, the commercial organisation had in place "adequate procedures designed to prevent persons associated with [the organisation] from undertaking such conduct". Under the act's explanatory notes, the burden of proof in this situation is on the organisation, with the standard of proof being "on the balance of probabilities". In 2018, a London-based company Skansen Interiors Ltd., who admitted to an incident of bribery, but sought to rely on the "adequate defences" defences, was found not to have put in place sufficient measures to meet the requirements of the act.

Guidance was published by the Secretary of State for Justice three months before the act came into force. The guidance sets out six principles to be followed by business. They cover:

1. Proportionate procedures
2. Top-level commitment
3. Risk assessment
4. Due diligence
5. Communication (including training)
6. Monitoring and review

The one firm conclusion to be drawn from the guidance is that every commercial organisation that might be subject to the rigours of the act needs to have a code of conduct in place that appropriately reflects the guidance and to ensure its personnel are fully conversant with the risks and adequately trained. If it is then charged with the offence of failing to prevent bribery, it would be able to show evidence of the 'adequate procedures' which it will need in order to defend itself.

=== Prosecution and penalties ===
Section 10 requires the authorisation of any prosecution by the director of the appropriate prosecution agency before a case can go ahead; this is a shift from the old regime, which required the consent of the Attorney General for England and Wales. Section 11 explains the penalties for individuals and companies found guilty of committing a crime. If an individual is found guilty of a bribery offence, tried as a summary offence, he or she may be imprisoned for up to 12 months and fined up to £5,000. Someone found guilty on indictment, however, faces up to 10 years' imprisonment and an unlimited fine. The crime of a commercial organisation failing to prevent bribery is punishable by an unlimited fine. In addition, a convicted individual or organisation may be subject to a confiscation order under the Proceeds of Crime Act 2002, while a company director who is convicted may be disqualified under the Company Directors Disqualification Act 1986.

=== Other provisions ===
The scope of the act's provisions is set out in section 12. For someone to fall within the act's purview, he or she must have either committed a crime inside the United Kingdom, or acted outside of the United Kingdom in a way which would have constituted a crime had it happened in the UK. For a prosecution in the latter case, the person must have a "close connection" to the UK, which includes being a British citizen, resident or protected person, a company incorporated in the UK, or a Scottish partnership. Section 13 provides the only defence available with the general bribery offences—that the conduct was necessary for the proper functioning of the intelligence services or, when engaged in active service, the armed forces. Under section 14, senior officers or directors in a company which commits a general bribery offence will also be liable for the purposes of the act. In the case of an offence committed by a partnership, Section 15 provides that the prosecution must be brought in the name of the partnership and not in the name of any of the partners.

Under section 16, the act applies to servants of the crown, while section 17 repeals all previous common law and statutory offences relating to bribery, replacing them with provisions of the act. Section 18 provides that the act applies to England and Wales, Scotland and Northern Ireland; while the separate consent of the Scottish Parliament is usually required in such cases, as is made clear in section 19, a Legislative Consent Motion was passed on 11 February 2010, allowing for the application of the act within Scotland.

== Assessment ==
The act has been described as "the toughest anti-corruption legislation in the world", raising the bar above the standard set by the United States Foreign Corrupt Practices Act. Despite being "widely drafted and far-reaching in scope [and] in many ways an improvement upon earlier corruption legislation", significant concerns have been raised, mainly around the fact that the act may harm British industry's competitiveness in the global market. David Aaronberg and Nichola Higgins, writing in the Archbold Review, argue that section 6 particularly has the potential to include actions which are ethically problematic but seen as legally permissible. Aisha Anwar and Gavin Deeprose in the Scots Law Times take a similar line, highlighting as particularly problematic areas corporate hospitality and facilitation payments, described as "essentially a form of extortion on the payer and, although not a common feature in the UK, they are commonplace in many foreign jurisdictions", which may fall under the scope of the act despite being permissible in the commercial world.

The Ministry of Justice's guidance document explains the policy goal behind the act not making an exception for facilitation payments:

As was the case under the old law, the Bribery Act does not (unlike US foreign bribery law) provide any exemption for such payments. The 2009 Recommendation of the Organisation for Economic Co-operation and Development recognises the corrosive effect of facilitation payments and asks adhering countries to discourage companies from making such payments. Exemptions in this context create artificial distinctions that are difficult to enforce, undermine corporate anti-bribery procedures, confuse anti-bribery communication with employees and other associated persons, perpetuate an existing 'culture' of bribery and have the potential to be abused.

— Ministry of Justice, Bribery Act 2010 guidance

== Parliamentary committee ==
In May 2018, the House of Lords appointed a select committee to report on the act. The committee considered the issue of corporate hospitality and the challenge of conducting business across different cultures. They found that some companies were so nervous that they worried about providing a sandwich lunch, and that guidance provided to firms regulated by the Financial Conduct Authority differed from the Ministry of Justice Guidance. As there had not been any judicial interpretation of the act, the committee felt that discretion would still be needed, depending on the circumstances of each commercial relationship, the underlying principle being that intention is key. The committee was dissolved in March 2019.

== Impact ==
Corruption in the United Kingdom, in the public sector, is defined by public servants using their office for private gain. Public sector corruption in the United Kingdom is perceived to be mostly rare with Transparency International rating the United Kingdom joint 11th out of 180 in their 2020 Corruption Perceptions Index.

The United Kingdom currently has numerous laws that punish civil servants for bribery and other forms of corruption, with the Bribery Act 2010 currently the most relevant. Though the UK has long maintained a high rating in the Corruption Perceptions Index, public discontent as well as dissatisfaction has persisted, with criticism from newspapers also having so as well. This has largely been because of the UK's fall from the top 10 in the CPI.

The Bribery Act 2010 is currently the most relevant law in the United Kingdom that punishes public and private bribery. The law does not make any distinction in sentencing between those who bribe (or are bribed) in the public or private sector.

== See also ==
- Foreign Corrupt Practices Act, a U.S. law prohibiting Americans from bribing foreign officials to the benefit of their personal business interests
- Corruption of Foreign Public Officials Act, a Canadian law prohibiting individuals and businesses from bribing foreign officials to obtain or retain business advantages

== Bibliography ==
- Aaronberg, David; Nichola Higgins (2010). "The Bribery Act 2010: all bark and no bite...?". Archbold Review. 2010 (5). Sweet & Maxwell. ISSN 1756-7432.
- Anwar, Aisha; Gavin Deeprose (2010). "The Bribery Act 2010". Scots Law Times. 2010 (23). Sweet & Maxwell. ISSN 0036-908X.
- Breslin, Brigid; Doron Ezickson; John Kocoras (2010). "The Bribery Act 2010: raising the bar above the US Foreign Corrupt Practices Act". Company Lawyer. 31 (11). Sweet & Maxwell. ISSN 0144-1027.
- "The Bribery Act 2010". Criminal Law Review. 2010 (6). Sweet & Maxwell. 2010. ISSN 0011-135X.
- Pope, Tim; Thomas Webb (2010). "The Bribery Act 2010". Journal of International Banking Law and Regulation. 25 (10). Sweet & Maxwell. ISSN 0267-937X.
- Sheikh, Saleem (2011). "The Bribery Act 2010: commercial organisations beware!". International Company and Commercial Law Review. 22 (1). Sweet & Maxwell. ISSN 0958-5214.
- Sullivan, G. (2011). "The Bribery Act 2010: Part One: an overview". Criminal Law Review. 2011 (2). ISSN 0011-135X.
