= Mehdi El Idrissi =

Moroccan businessman (born 1977)

- المهدي الإدريسي
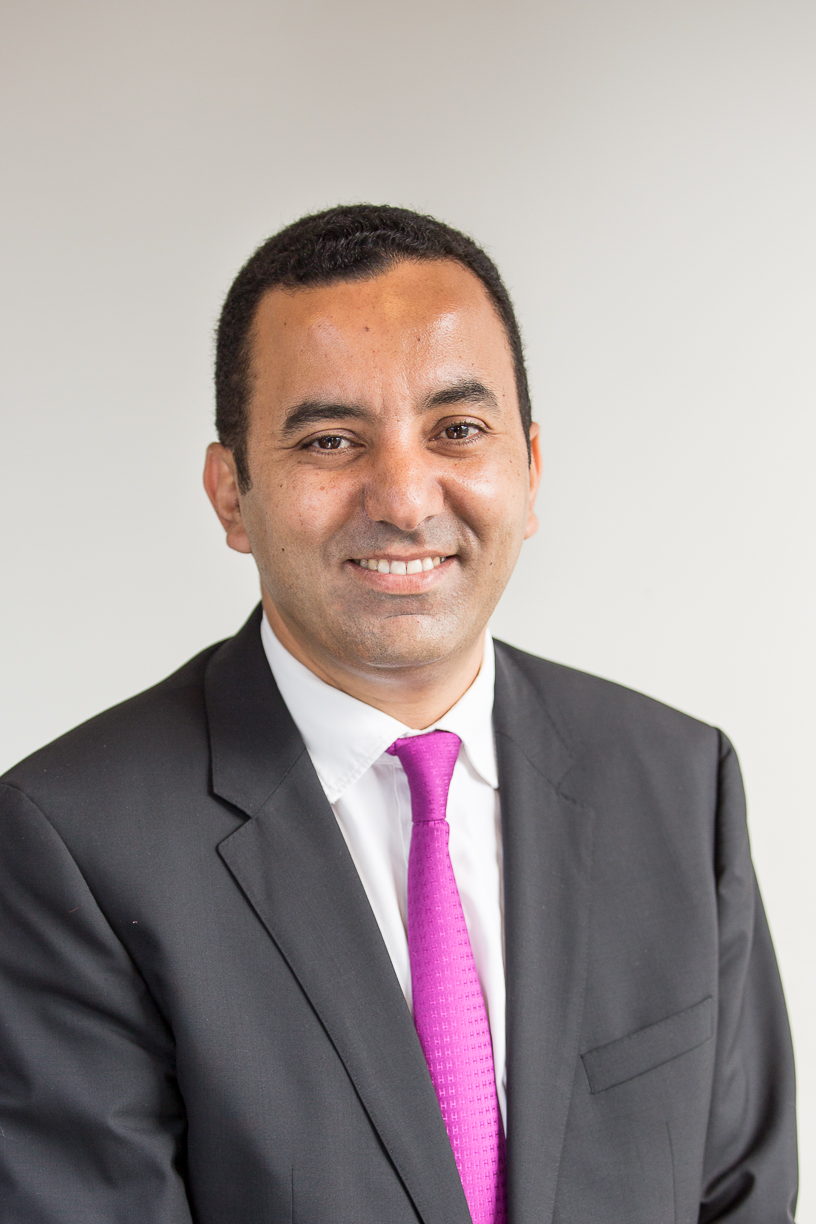
- Mehdi El Idrissi in 2015
- Born: 1977 (age 48–49); Casablanca, Morocco
- Occupation: Businessman
- Years active: 2002 – present

Mehdi El Idrissi (Arabic: المهدي الإدريسي; born 1977 in Casablanca) is a Moroccan business executive active in industry, economic policy and leadership advisory. Since 2002, he has held roles in private-sector management, national business institutions and international consulting.

== Career ==
Mehdi began his career in 2002 within the Kettani Family Group in Morocco, as CEO of the newly created Ekman Converting Group, a joint venture with the Swedish Ekman & Co. He then contributed to the restructuring of the Kettani Group — a company operating in cellulose processing, paper wadding and real estate — as CFO and working across North and West Africa (including Algeria, Morocco, Ivory Coast, Mali and Senegal).

In 2007, he became General Secretary of the Moroccan Business Association (CGEM). In 2008, he was promoted to Chief Executive of CGEM, contributing to several national industrial strategies, including the Pacte national pour l'émergence industrielle.

From 2010 to 2015, Mehdi was CEO of MEDI BUSINESS JET, an aviation company operating from Morocco and covering Africa, Europe and the Middle East.

From 2015 to 2019, he was Partner for Africa and the Middle East at Eurosearch & Associés. He supported the development of companies across sectors and advised investment funds in Morocco, sub-Saharan Africa and the wider MENA region.

He is Managing Director of ALIDES, part of the ECI Group.

=== Other roles ===
He has been a board member of the Moroccan Business Association. As head of the Offset Commission, he worked on the legislative framework governing Public–Private Partnerships in Morocco.

Mehdi is a board member of the National Council for Foreign Trade (CNCE), a body gathering public and private actors involved in foreign trade.

He is also a member of the Confluence Club of CEPS, an independent think tank founded in 1985.

In the humanitarian field, he is involved with the associations "Coup de pouce humanitaire", "Autremonde" and "#Leplusimportant".

== Awards and education ==
In 2010, he was awarded the title of Chevalier de l’Ordre du Mérite by the King of Morocco.

Mehdi is an International Visitor Leadership Program alumnus, selected for the Entrepreneurship and Business Management track following President Barack Obama's A New Beginning speech in Cairo.
