= Offset agreement =

Provisions to an import agreement

Offsets are compensatory trade agreements, reciprocal trade agreements, between an exporting foreign company, or possibly a government acting as intermediary, and an importing entity. Offset agreements often involve trade in military goods and services and are alternatively called: industrial compensations, industrial cooperation, offsets, industrial and regional benefits, balances, juste retour or equilibrium, to define mechanisms more complex than counter-trade. Counter-trade can also be considered one of the many forms of defense offset, to compensate a purchasing country. The incentive for the exporter results from the conditioning of the core transaction to the acceptance of the offset obligation.

The main difference between a generic offset and counter-trade, both common practices in the international defense trade, is the involvement of money. In counter-trade, goods are paid through barters or other mechanisms without the exchange of money, while in other generic offsets money is the main medium of exchange.

== Definition ==
Offsets can be defined as provisions to an import agreement, between an exporting foreign company, or possibly a government acting as intermediary, and an importing public entity, that oblige the exporter to undertake activities in order to satisfy a second objective of the importing entity, distinct from the acquisition of the goods and/or services that form the core transaction. The incentive for the exporter results from the conditioning of the core transaction to the acceptance of the offset obligation.

Often, the proclaimed aim of this process is to even-up a country's balance of trade. However, some forms of offsets transactions do not represent trade flows going from the initial importer towards the initial exporter. Offsets are frequently an integral part of international defense contracts.

=== Offset as unfair burden ===
The U.S. government's definition of offset agreement is the most crucial, since the U.S. aerospace and defense industry is the biggest exporter of aerospace and defence products, and therefore engaged in the majority of the world's offsets. The U.S. has a Commerce Department Division, the Bureau of Industry and Security (BIS), that deals specifically with U.S. defense offset agreements with foreign nations as a main subset of U.S. industrial security. BIS - whose main task is protecting U.S. security from the point of view of export of high technology, fostering commercially acceptable U.S. foreign policy, and protecting U.S. economic interests - deals with U.S. aerospace and defense companies that export defense products, systems or services, involving "offset agreements," that is, those sales' collateral or additional agreements requested by purchasers. BIS defines offsets as "mandatory compensations required by foreign governments when purchasing weapon systems and services."

The U.S. government underlines the compulsory aspect of this trade practice, since the United States, with other weapons exporting countries, such as Germany and France, opposes offsets as forms of protectionism and harmful transgressions of free market rules. These governments frown on offset agreements, consider them to be both market distorting and inefficient. In 2002, U.S. companies had 49% of global defense industry export, EU% 35. Data from AECMA 2002 Facts and Figures.

=== Offset as partnership ===
In 2008 the Brazilian Minister of Strategic Affairs, speaking of a major defense purchase by his country, highlighted this key point: "We will not simply be buyers or clients, but partners." The competition by different companies "in offering comparable weapons to a country" is also on the level of "sharing" or "partnership" with the purchaser, Roberto Mangabeira Unger added.

=== Offset as marketing tool ===
In weapons trade, defense contractors are fully aware that offsets are powerful marketing tools to motivate the purchase, by showing and giving additional advantages for the purchasing country besides investing in military equipment. The U.S. defense industry position seems to be more practical, and somewhat quietly nonaligned with U.S. government economic or political assessment of defense offsets. Generally speaking, one can understand offsets as a widespread sales technique. As such, they are not restricted to weapons sale, they belong to commerce itself, in the same way that rebates, price-pack deals, or loyalty rewards programs do. Understanding "defense offsets" to be part of a sales technique helps to curb the justified yet excessive emphasis on their mandatory nature.

Often, defense offsets are more motivating than the primary defense acquisition, for personal or political reasons. This may seem irrational, but it is part of commerce. If one adds the prevalent political aspect of spending huge public funds on modern weapons, then the motivating significance of defense offsets could not be underestimated in contemporary decision processes of democracies. Prime defense contractors are well aware of offsets' power in the psychologies of democracies. As anyone can understand, the seller will include the cost of the "Envelope B," that is, of the offset and its added value for the purchaser, in its total cost. In other words, the client will pay for the offset; it is not a free lunch. But the key question is: to what extent is the offset proposal a factor in the consideration of defense contractor's tender during the evaluation and the decision procedures? Transparency International clearly summarizes that using offsets as marketing tools makes offsets "the ideal playground for corruption":

There are three main categories of corruption risk from offsets:

1. Improperly influencing the need for a particular defence acquisition in the first place
2. Influencing the competitive decision for the main contract in non-transparent ways

3. Allowing favours to be repaid to corrupt government officials via the offset contracts

— Defence Offsets: Addressing The Risks Of Corruption & Raising Transparency, Transparency International, 2010.

The universe of this military niche of offsets trade is sophisticated and less innocuous than commonly believed. In 2000 Daniel Pearl wrote an article about the universe of offsets: "could the sale of U.S. weapons in the Persian Gulf help an oil concern unload gasoline stations in Europe? Yes, under the new logic of international arms deals." Pearl describes the new-found world of indirect offsets:

For decades, countries that buy weapons have imposed "offset" requirements on their suppliers that keep some of the economic benefits of the deal at home.

Now, defense contractors are moving toward more exotic plans to satisfy their growing offset obligations.

Many deals have no relationship to the weapons being sold, and a few have only a tenuous connection to the country that is buying.

— Daniel Pearl

The market size of the international offset business is related to the volume of international weapons trade in the world. According to SIPRI, in 2007 there were US$51 billion of weapons exports, an approximate value because it is open source, and not all weapons deals data are open source information.

== Defense offset example ==
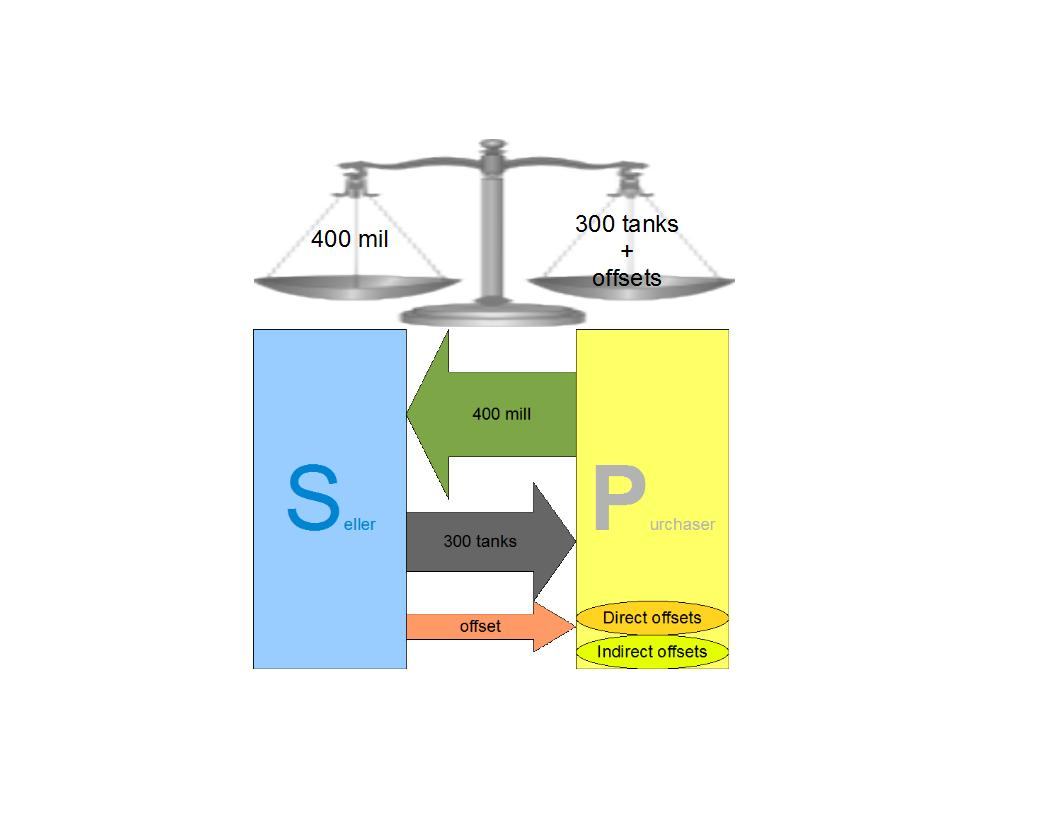
Example of a defense Offset - diagram

As an example of a defense offset proposal, we could describe a hypothetical case of Nation P (Purchaser) buying 300 tanks from defense company S (Seller, of Nation S). The total sale contract is $400 million and Nation P (Purchaser) requests offset of 120%. Defense Company S (Seller) is obliged to fulfill an offset equal to 120% of the sales contract, that is $480M. Nation P agrees on a list of specific offset deals and programs to fulfill the agreed total obligation with Company S (Seller). The offset agreement includes both direct and indirect offsets.

Nation P also assigns a credit value for each typology of offsets offered by Company S. The credit value for the offset obligations is not the "actual value," but it is the "actual value" by a multiplier, that expresses the degree of interest of Nation P (Purchaser) in the proposed offsets. In other words, something deemed very valuable by nation P will have a high multiplier that expresses the importance and the value to Nation P of that type of offset. The multiplier (for instance 2, or 5, or 7) translates nation P's attached value into the credit value that eventually accounts for the fulfillment of the agreed sum of $480M (120% of offset); it is evident that with no multipliers, 120% offset would be nonsense. Most of the offset packages are divided into direct and indirect offsets. Here is a hypothetical, complex offset offer, divided into direct and indirect offsets in Nation P.

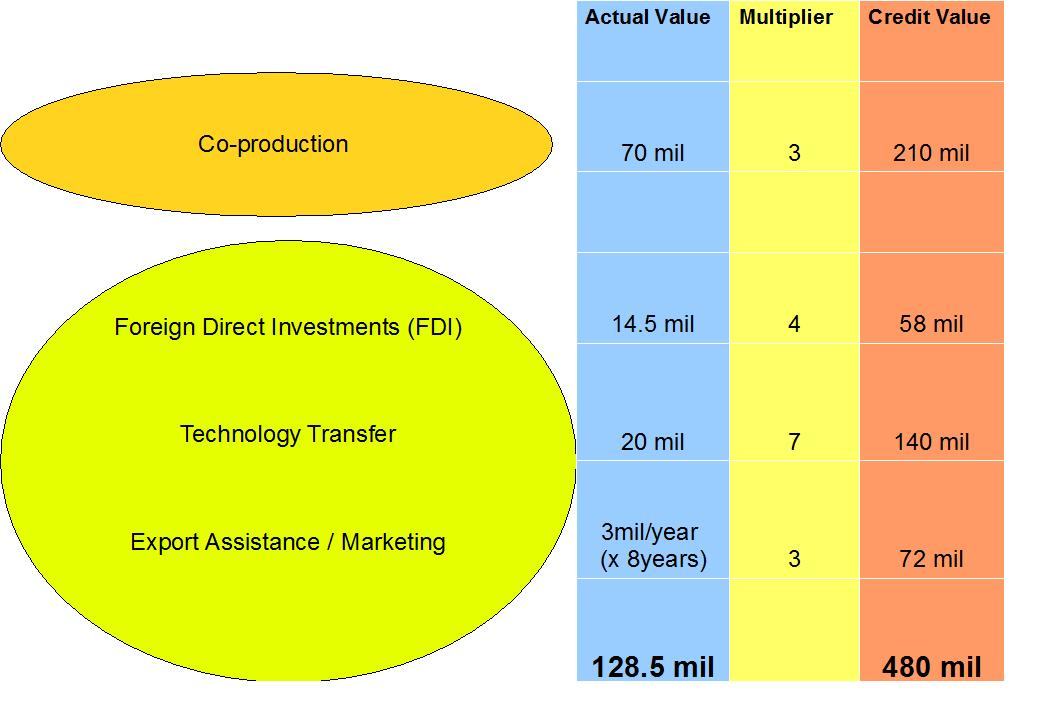
Defense offset hypothetical example

Direct Offsets (military and related to the product of the Company S, i.e. the tanks in this example)

Co-production: Nation P chooses one or more local companies to manufacture some components of the tanks, such as turrets and some of the internal components. The actual value of the components is $70 million. Nation P assigns a multiplier of 3, since this develops capabilities of its military industrial base and creates jobs in Nation P. The total credit value for the fulfillment of the overall offset obligation is $70M x 3 = $210M.

Indirect Offsets (civilian and other agreements not related to the production of the weapons item, the tanks. They could be also military or security related, but not directly connected with the main acquisition, i.e., the tanks)

Foreign Direct Investments: Company S makes investments in 5 (defense or non-defense) companies in Nation P. The total value of the investments is $14.5M, and the multiplier is 4, a high multiplier, since Nation "P" suffers from a chronic lack of Foreign Direct Investments. This makes an additional credit value for Company S of $58M.

Technology Transfer: Company S provides water desalination technologies to one Nation P company. This technology is particularly appreciated by Nation "P". Its actual value is $20M, but the credit value is 7 times the actual value, that is, $140M.

Export Assistance and Marketing: Company S provides commercial assistance to market products and services of a Nation "P" company in a difficult market, such as, for instance, the Middle East. The assistance is offered for 8 years, at the value of $3M per year. Nation P considers this assistance to export as important to create new revenue streams and jobs for its company, and sets a multiplier of 3. Credit value: $72M. (Since company S is not an expert on marketing and export assistance, it may hire a specialist company to subcontract the job. Such a subcontractor is also known as an "offset fulfiller").

Nation P controls not only the supply of the military systems or services, but also the implementation of the offsets according to the offset agreement included or related to the main supply contract. This control is within the Minister of Defense and/or Ministry of Economy or Finance, or Ministry of Industry and Trade. Often arms importing nations establish special agencies for the supervision of the defense offsets.

== Types of offset ==
Offset proposals often make a distinction between direct and indirect offset.

Direct offset is a side agreement that is directly related to the main product/service that is bought/sold, that is military equipment, systems, or services. They may be also called military offsets. For example, a buyer of military equipment may be given the right to produce a component of a related technology in the buyer's country.

Indirect offsets are side agreements that are not directly related to the product/service that is bought/sold. Most people refer to such category of offsets as civilian offsets, though there are many indirect offsets that are not civilian offsets. Indirect offsets may take the form of services, investments, counter-trade and/or co-production. For instance, Greek companies produce part of the Lockheed C-130 that they bought from U.S. The Greek co-production is a U.S. direct offset. Or, in a more sophisticated form of offset involving three countries, Portugal is in charge of the maintenance of Kuwaiti Lockheed Martin aircraft. This is a Portuguese "direct offset", since Portugal bought the aircraft, and is partner in charge of their maintenance. An investment in a security software company of Romania, or in assisting the export and marketing in difficult areas of a Belgian environmental company are other forms of actual indirect offsets.

The most common types of direct/indirect offsets are:

Direct offset	Direct or Indirect offset	Indirect offset
Co-production	Technology Transfer	Export Assistance
Subcontracts	Training	Purchases
	Licensed Production	Offset Swapping (compensation of offsets' obligation through reciprocal abatement)
	Foreign Direct Investment, Credit Assistance and Financing

The most complete and accurate list of actual offsets can be found in the BIS Annual Reports to Congress, where all forms of registered offset are codified, according to the old Standard Industrial Classification.

== Some offset mechanisms ==
Since offsets typically include military departments of sovereign nations comparable to the US Defense Department, many countries have offset laws, public regulations or, alternatively, formal internal offset policies.

=== Defense prime contractor, offset service providers ===
In medium and large tenders for weapons systems the bid can be very complex, involving one or more than one company as bidder. The main offer is guided by a prime contractor that may have other companies associated to the bid as partners or as subcontractors. However, in regards to the agreed offset proposal only the prime contractor is liable toward the final client for its fulfillment. Since offsets are increasingly complex, the prime contractor may hire subcontractors to fulfill its contractual obligations. While the liability for the offsets stays with the prime contractor, the job can be executed by a subcontractor, or an offset fulfiller. One of the collateral benefits of offsets in U.S. (probably not offsetting the adverse effects of defense offsets on economy and jobs) is the proliferation of legal and economic jobs in the "offsets sector," that goes from international legal companies to the fully staffed international offices of U.S. defense companies. In addition, the establishment of new companies in "offset" venture capital, in "offset" marketing assistance: offset fulfillers that provide their support services to the defense and aerospace industry. While many offset programs originally evolved as a result of defense and aerospace sales, today many new offset / Industrial Partnership programs have developed as a result of nations wanting to improve their industrial base, level of technology and desire to become more self-sufficient across a broad range of industry sectors. As a result of this new interest and demand for Industrial Partnership, there has been both a growth and establishment of new offset associations. There are both Global and Domestic "Offset" / Industrial Partnership organizations. The largest and most widely attended global association is GOCA, the Global Offset and Countertrade Association, whose purpose is to promote trade and commerce between companies around the world and their foreign customers through a greater understanding of countertrade and offset. Each year GOCA hosts several industry meetings in partnership with other European and American offset organizations such as the ADS, Aerospace Defence Security and DIOA, the U.S. Defense Industry Offset Association. DIOA was established in 1985 by members of the U.S. Defense Industry to foster education, networking and guidelines for professionalism in offsets implementations. The industry meetings referenced above are attended by leading global industrial companies, companies that specialize in providing support services for Industrial Partnership fulfillment, and by various government and military authorities, mostly from national ministries of defense and economy, who oversee and monitor offset and Industrial Partnership programs. The purpose of these industry meetings is to educate, and to foster relationships between the various offset obligors and beneficiaries so that real and sustainable economic benefits can be delivered to nations who are seeking to improve their respective economies. Offsets and Industrial Partnership programs have been evolving for over three decades and there are dozens of articles that describe various successes and challenges that have resulted from implementing offset programs. The most widely read publication that deals with the developments in the Offset and Industrial Participation arena is Countertrade and Offset ("CTO").

Offset fulfillers /service providers may perform various support services: including marketing assistance, sourcing and structuring venture capital or other forms of corporate credit for Foreign Direct Investment (FDI), or more complex things, such as a joint ventures to produce shrimp (Devcorp, Bahrain), a sugar factory, or, recently, environment and renewable energy.

=== Offset certificates, penalties, confidentiality clauses, pre-offset activities ===
Offsets are of various durations. They may be planned to last for 1 or 2 years, but 8-10 year plans are very common; exceptionally long is an offset like Al Yamamah Program, a BAE-UK offset in Saudi Arabia in place since 1987. Clients (sovereign countries) have in place mechanisms to control their implementations, and to certificate milestone accomplishments in their offset programs. An offset supervision authority certifies the advancement in the offset completion in percentages, issuing offset certificates. These certificates may be issued to prime contractors fulfilling their offset agreement, but also to offset fulfillers, that have subcontracted the job from prime contractors and registered as such in the foreign countries. When there are multipliers, such certificates express the percentage of completion in "credit value" ("actual value" X multiplier). Offset fulfillers redeems the offsets certificates through contracts or subcontracts with the prime contractor. More recently, given the importance and the growth of offset practices around the world, offset fulfillers can "sell" their certificates to prime contractors other than their initial one, as long as they have national offset commissions authorizations. In this profitable niche of defense industry made by offset specialists, lawyers and companies - there is also a "currency" and a "trade" of offset certificates.

Like in any contract, there are forms of penalty for failing to complete offset obligations. Many nations have rigid systems of penalties, including the use of bank guarantees, while other nations believe in continued negotiations that are based on "the best effort" clauses. The list of incentives and penalties for offset is no different from many other systems of procurement, with two remarkable exceptions:

1. In the offset business there are two contracts proceeding in parallel, i.e. primary (A) and side (B) contract:

A) The supply of defense equipment/services from the Defense Company to the Client (Foreign State), according to contractual specification (quality, quantity, time, etc.)
B) The offsets progress as monitored by the same Client (Foreign State), but most of the times by a different State entity, according to contractual offset agreement (quality, quantity, time, etc.).

These two contracts impact on each other and problems with one can affect the other. However, since most offsets today are not "direct," this may create confusions and distortions, especially due to "indirect offsets."

2. In direct offsets contracts there are legitimate "clauses of confidentiality", that in several countries may even assume value of official classification, up to secret of state. In European Union States, however, extending state secret classifications to indirect offsets - that have nothing to do with military or state security - is considered an abuse. For instance, classifying an offset not-related to state security or military preparedness - such as indirect and civilian offsets in pharmaceutical research, environmental technologies or export assistance of any non-military/security products - leads not only to major market distortions but also to possibly unpunished corruption protected by baseless secrecy. Pre-offset activities are allowed and welcomed by several countries; they are like offsets without certainties to obtain "credit value". These activities are straight marketing activities, similar to lobbying, to promote specific defense purchases. These pre-offset activities must be registered as such with national authorities. Often pre-offset activities will receive certificates, after a sale. Defense companies include them in the marketing budget, but after the sale, these offsets go into their offset budgets, and count toward offset fulfillment. These kinds of pre-offset activities are sales arguments to convince the buying state of the strength and reliability of the aerospace & defense company as potential supplier and partner. The pre-offsets arena is also the delicate and problematic field of sale-facilitators and, precisely because the client is a state, this must be monitored with additional care, since this field is prone to abuse and outright corruption.

=== Foreign military and direct commercial sales – "no known offsets" and FMS ===
For the U.S., the major world exporter of weapons by far, there are two main ways to sell weapons to a foreign country. The first is referred to as "Direct Commercial Sale" and it is a company to government sale. The second way is referred to as "Foreign Military Sales", that is a government to government sale.

A Direct Commercial Sale is highly supervised by U.S. Government and even by the U.S. Congress, in spite of its free market appearance. The arms trade, because of its connection with national security, is never free from strict government supervision.

For a sale to a foreign country's Defense Department, a U.S. defense firm must be licensed. It is checked by the Defense Department and by the State Department, and, in the case of relevant sales, even authorized or vetoed by U.S. Congress. Direct Commercial Sales are highly regulated because of security, political, and commercial reasons. Even from the point of view of indirect and non-military offset agreements, U.S. Defense companies and their subcontractors (offset fulfillers) must present detailed report of their offset activities to the Commerce Department, Bureau of Industry and Security (BIS).

Foreign Military Sales are indirect sales of weapons produced by one or more U.S. contractors through an agency of the Department of Defense, the Defense Security Cooperation Agency (DSCA). In a way, DSCA acts as Prime Contractor's agent in promoting and selling U.S. made weapons to foreign countries. The known FMS disadvantage is that DSCA adds to the final sale price a small percentage for its own administrative costs; the advantage is some free training with U.S. Armed Forces for joint international operations. In this type of sale, however, there are two important aspects in regards to the offset business.

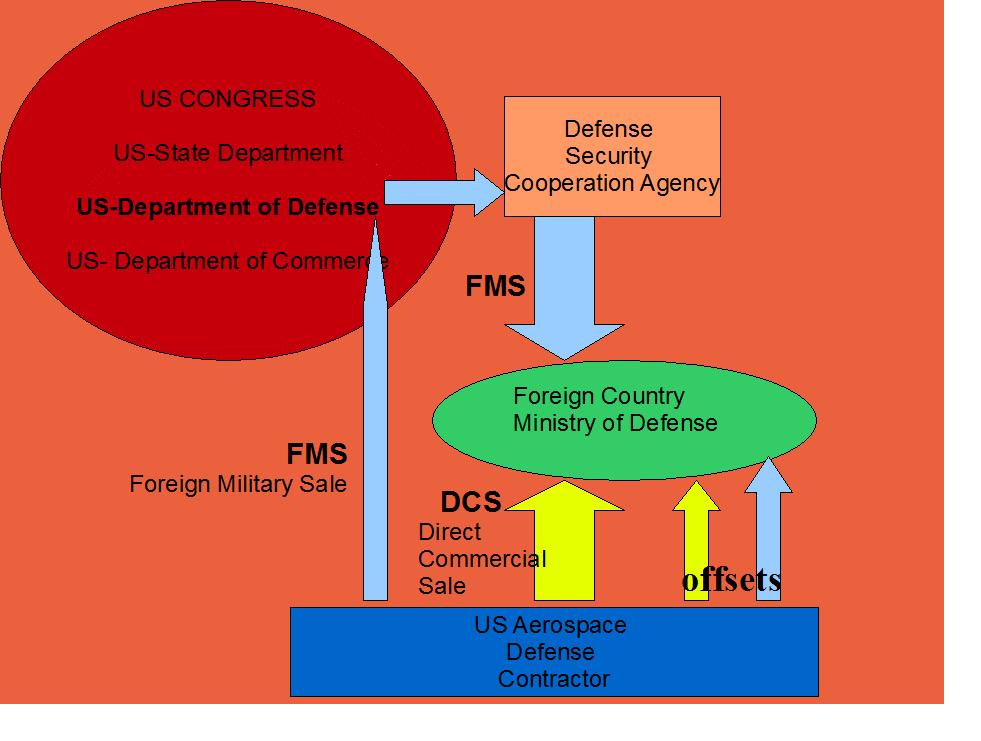
FMS-DCS-Offsets

1) Since 1990, under a specific directive by President George Bush, no U.S. Federal Agency or U.S. Government employee can be involved in the offset business. To each press release about a FMS (or of any documents regarding a FMS), there is a standard disclaimer: "There are no known offset agreements proposed in connection with this (potential) sale."

This language seems to imply that U.S. Government, as the broker for the FMS case, has special insight into the transaction and is almost certifying that there are, in fact, no offsets. Nothing could be further from the truth.

— Mark Nackman, A Critical Examination Of Offsets In International Defense Procurements.

The Defense Security Cooperation Agency acts on behalf of the prime contractor with a foreign government and refuses even the mere knowledge about offsets, but under the FMS program prime contractors are allowed to put all their offset costs into the final price.

The cost of the offset is not even itemized in the FMS offer, and if the client wants to discuss or simply to know the cost of the offset, the client must speak directly with the Contractor and not with DSCA. In other words, U.S. Government cannot deal with offsets; U.S. Defense Prime Contractors can and do. DSCA has made available in its complete manual details and analytical explanations for U.S. Defense companies on how to include the offset various costs into their contract and invoices. So prime contractors, even under FMS, are allowed to recover all costs "of any offsets which are associated with those contracts." To be sure, "U.S. Government agencies may not enter into or commit U.S. companies to any offset agreement." De facto during the cold war offsets had different functions and often U.S. Government Agencies were directly involved. President Bush, by ending the cold war with a victory, likewise ended U.S. agencies' liability in delicate practices like the offsets (1990), since they lost the primary political value they had during the cold war.

2) U.S. funds assigned by United States Foreign Military Financing (FMF) that may be connected with Foreign Military Sales (FMS) cannot be used for any type of offsets, if they are non-repayable funds. On the other hand, FMF funds may be used for offset costs if they are loans. In any case, "U.S. Government agencies may not enter into or commit U.S. firms to any offset agreement."

== List of offset policies of different countries ==
The following is a cursory survey on some countries' offset policies. It does not enter into details, and basically it gives: 1) the legal base for the offset; 2) the purchase threshold above which there is a requests for offset;

3) the requested "quantity" of offset by the country in terms of percentages of the contract value; 4) the applied multipliers, that qualify ("quality") through a number the appreciations of a certain type of offsets (the "Credit Value" of an offset is the "Actual Value" by the multiplier); 5) and some remarks or specific information, including the websites of the National Offset activities.

A detailed list of the National Laws and Policies of the Countries of the European Union can be found in the website of European Defense Agency in a new "EU Offset Portal". Another very useful analysis of country policies can be found in Belgian Ministry of Economy (in charge of Belgian offsets). This publicly available document gives one of the most intelligent global analyses of countries offsets policies, with a purchaser's perspective, that is the point of view of weapons importer countries. From a similar point of view, one can see the purchaser's point of view on offsets in UAE offset web-page, in the new Kuwaiti articulated offset policy.

On the seller's point of view, in Bureau of Industry and Security (BIS) Annual Reports to U.S. Congress one can find the position on offsets of weapons exporters countries like U.S. Magazines and specialized publications like Jane's Defence Industry, EPICOS, Countertrade & Offset or CTO give detail accounts and updates on national policies, requests, changes, etc.

=== Australia ===
The Department of Defense (Defense Material Organization) is in charge of the offset. The threshold is 5 million Australian dollars. Multipliers go from 1 to 6. By rule, Australia does not accept indirect (civilian) offsets, unless such offsets brings benefits to the Australian Defense Industry.

=== Austria ===
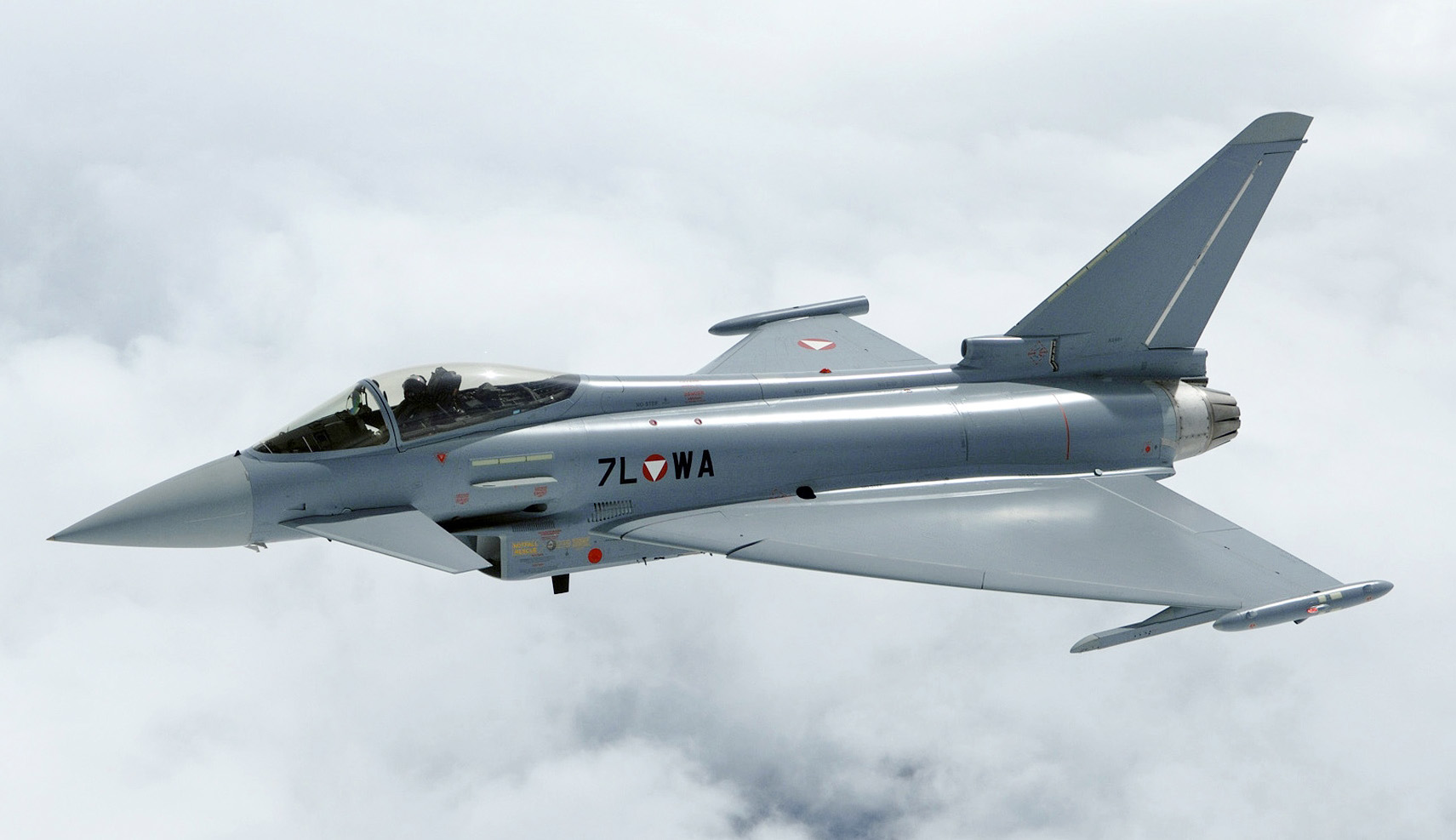
Austrian Eurofighter Typhoon Bundesministerium für Landesverteidigung und Sport

Offset Agreements are negotiated by the Federal Ministry of Economic Affairs and Labor on a case-by-case basis; the percentage of offset is above 100%, up to 200% (and sometimes even more) of the contract values. Austria has one of the highest requests in the world for nominal quantity offsets. However, multipliers can go up to 10. The minimum value of the sale for mandatory offsets is 726,000 Euro. This high offset policy, applied to EADS Eurofighter Typhoons purchase in 2002 and still ongoing, was changed in 2008-9 when Austria signed the voluntary EU Code of Conduct on Offset. The relevant changes are the reduction of the offset quantity to 100% (that is the value of the purchase contract), the value of multipliers, and the monitoring function of the Federal Ministry of Defence and Sports.

=== Bahrain ===
Bahrain has no offset policy. The Kingdom imports about 80% of its weapons from U.S. via FMS, and the rest of weapons procurement comes from U.K. However, a specific offset policy is expected soon.

=== Belgium ===
A Royal Decree (6/2/1997, and modified-6/12/2001) is the legal foundation of the Belgian Industrial Benefits Program. The program is directed by Ministry of Economic Affairs (Industrial Benefits in the Field of Defense Procuremen).t The threshold value is usually 11 million euro, but it is lower if it is not a public and open tender. The minimum required offset is 100%. Multipliers are not specified. The focus is on high technology and new or additional business flow. The Belgian offset guidelines are very sophisticated. One of the most important and explicit points is the so-called "newness aspect:" offsets, such export assistance, "must create unambiguously a new or additional business flow in export" for Belgian companies. Belgium distinguishes three forms of offsets: direct, semi-direct, and indirect. Belgium has a specific problem with the Industrial Benefit Programme, related to the de facto split of the country into Wallonia and Flanders. Belgian offset program is more meticulous than other European countries, but Belgian citizenry is aware that paying for offsets, instead of getting weapons at off-the-shelf price, implies not-so-transparent transfers of taxpayers' money to designated Belgian companies through political decisions. One can rightly consider such offset-transfer as confidential state subsidy. Flemish parties claim that subsidies to Wallonia cost proportionally more than the price West Germany paid for East Germany. The subsidies/offset issue was particularly acute in the repartition of direct and indirect industrial benefits for one of the recent acquisition with offsets: 242 Mowag Piranha for the Belgian Army from General Dynamics, over 700 M Euro. One of the controversial offsets connected with the Piranha III is a direct offset for the Piranha III co-production, and the disputed choice of a 90mm gun (produced by a Wallonian company) instead of 105mm NATO standard cannon.

=== Brazil ===
Brazilian offset policy was formally implemented by the Brazilian Air Force in 1990. However, the practice had already been used constantly at least from 1975. The Brazilian Mod updated its offset policy in 2018 (Resolution 61/GM-MD) when a new threshold of US$50 million was established, minor updates followed in 2021. The last update was made in 2023, by Resolution MD n°3.990. Deriving from the MD policy, Air Force, Navy, and Army have separate specific offset guidelines. The total offset request is 100% whenever possible. Multipliers are usually between 1 and 4, exceptionally 5. Brazilian offset policy emphasizes technological development of its defense industry, especially aerospace, through mainly technology transfers and training.

=== Bulgaria ===
Public Procurement Law 2004, revised in 2009. Direct offsets are supervised by the Defense Ministry, and indirect offsets by the Ministry of Economy and Energy. There is however a Permanent Inter-Ministerial Council of Special Purpose Public Procurement to approve offset agreements. The Agency for Information, Technology and Communications (SAITC) assists and coordinates offset projects. The threshold for offset is 5 million Euro. The minimum Value is 110% of the contract value. Multipliers are between 1 and 3. Offsets are generally 30% direct and 70% indirect.

=== Canada ===
Canada's offset agreements, known as Industrial and Technological Benefits (ITB) and Value Proposition (VP), are administered by the Defence Investment Agency (DIA), which assumed responsibility for the ITB Policy on 16 July 2026. The IRB Policy, the predecessor to the ITB/VP Policy, was created in 1986 to assist Canadian companies in leveraging government procurement. The Canadian government revamped the policy into the ITB/VP program in 2014. The new policy requires prime contractors to place sub-contracts and investments in the sectors of strategic value to the Canadian economy. Contractors must usually achieve 100% in offsets.

Offset achievements can be direct (transactions achieved in the performance of the contract) or indirect (transactions which are not directly related to the procured items and are, instead, related to investments, technology cooperation, and product mandates).

The ITB/VP program applies only to defence and Coast Guard procurements (and resulting contracts) for which the Canadian government has invoked the National Security Exemption (NSE). The NSE excludes a procurement from all trade agreements to which Canada is a signatory. Not all NSE-invoked procurements are subject to the ITB/VP policy, but all ITB/VP procurements are NSE-invoked. The Canadian government typically invokes the NSE for ITB/VP purposes on all defence and Coast Guard procurements over $100M (CAD) and those between $20M and $100M on a case-by-case basis.

An industry bidder submits two components as part of the offset proposal: and ITB portion and a VP portion. The ITB portion identifies the total offsets a bidder commits to achieving (measured in Canadian Content Value, or CCV) once under contract.

The VP portion identifies the CCV a bidder commits to achieving toward five pillars:

1. Work in the Canadian Defence Industry
2. Canadian Supplier Development
3. Research and Development
4. Exports from Canada
5. Skills and Development Training

The ITB/VP policy requires contractors to allocate a certain percentage (typically 15%) of the total contract value to small and medium-sized businesses. As of 2022, Canada also requires defence contractors to allocate 5% of the contract value to indigenously owned businesses. Defence contractors must also comply with Canada's gender and diversity policies.

=== Czech Republic ===
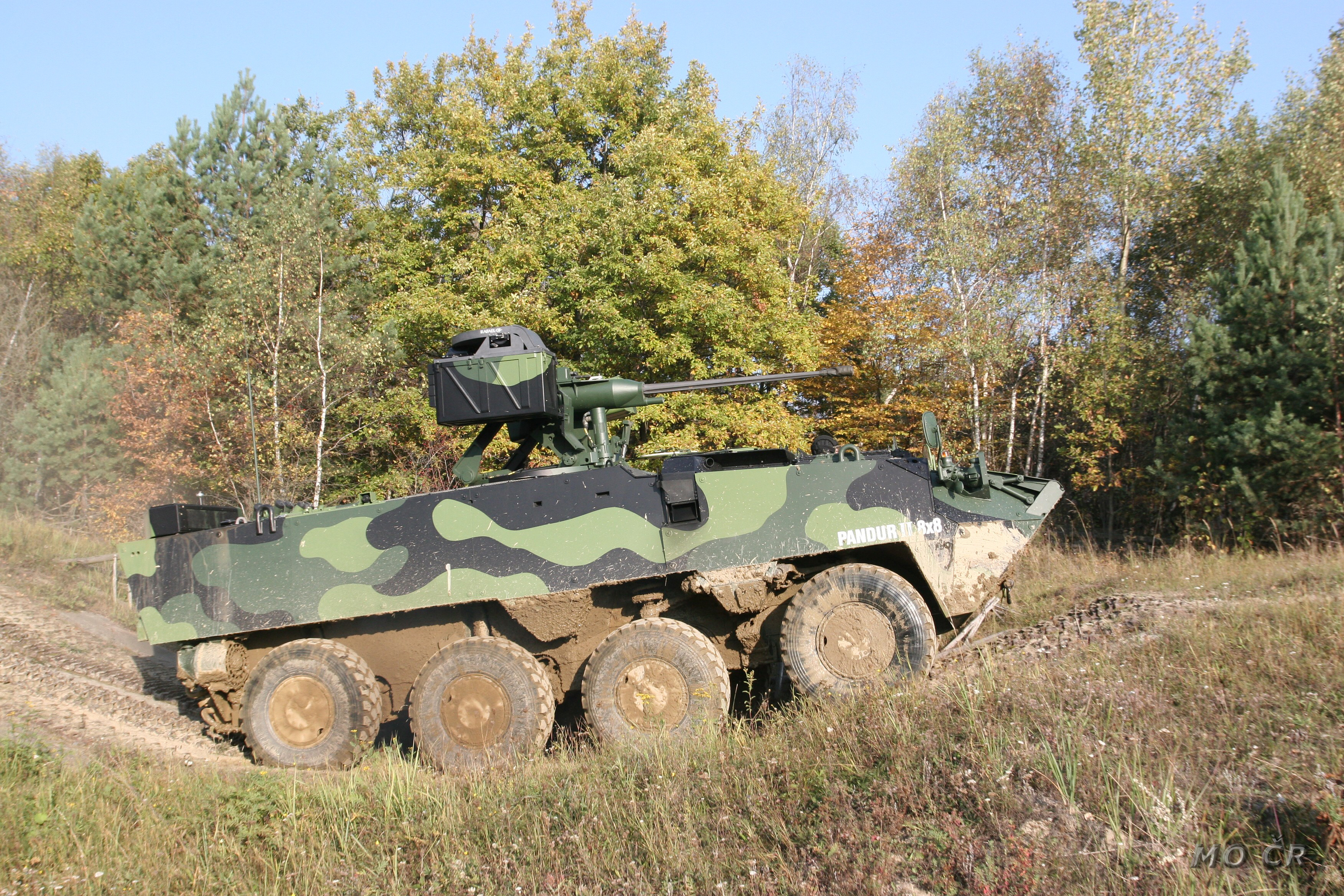
Armored Pandur II 8x8 by testing of Czech Army

Offset regulations are set by Government Resolution 9 - 2005. The Ministry of Trade and Industry is in charge of Industrial Cooperation (also through an Offset Commission). The minimum value of the contract is CZK 500 million. The minimum offset percentage is 100 per cent. No multipliers are used. Offset focus is on new technologies, co-operation and technology transfer. Minimum 20% of direct offset. The Offset Commission issues Annual Reports on the status of the offsets. One of the major offset controversies in Czech Republic is about the purchase of General Dynamics Pandur II, between 2003 and 2009. In February 2010 anti-corruption police have opened an investigation. According to The Prague Post "the investigation will center on two main issues: the alleged bribery of politicians and the military's reasons for paying three times more for the Pandur than Portugal, which also purchased" the same armoured vehicle.

=== Denmark ===
Ministry of Defense makes the acquisition, but the Ministry of Business and Growth is monitoring offset implementations stipulated in the individual ICC's (Industrial Cooperation Contracts). The Guidelines for Industrial Cooperation was issued in 2014 and replaced the former Offset Law which was rejected by the European Commission. The threshold is DKK 50 million and offset requirement varies from each project up to 100%. Multipliers up to 8 can be considered for R&D and technology or financial transfers. Denmark signed a trilateral agreement with UK and The Netherlands on "best practice for the application of abatements in offset" regarding swaps of offset obligations.

=== Estonia ===
No offset law. Estonia is particularly interested in counter-trade.

=== Finland ===
No law, only public guidelines on Industrial Participation. The Ministry of Defense is in charge, Defense Materiel Industry and Industrial Participation, but with The Ministry of Trade and Industry. The minimum contract value for offsets is EUR 10 million. 100% minimum of offset requirement. Multipliers are between 0.3 and 3.0 (for Finnish export). Technology transfer multipliers are negotiated. Finland's focus is on its domestic defense industry.

=== France ===
No formal offset policy, but has counter-trade and offset departments in the Ministry of Economic Affairs and in the Ministry of Defense. However, France like U.S., is almost completely independent on its own military needs, and it has a minimal amount of weapon procurements from foreign countries.

=== Germany ===
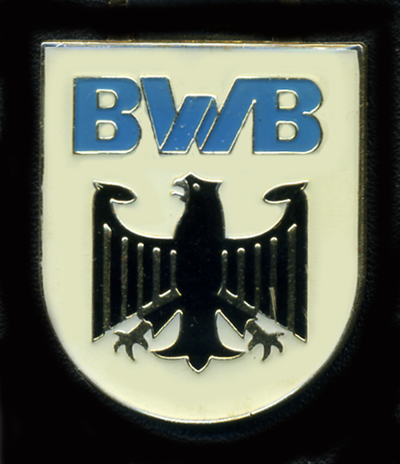
Agency for Defense Technology and Procurement

German official position is that offset arrangements are economically counterproductive in defense trade. However, Germany applies a policy of "industrial balances," based on 100% of the contract value. German Federal Ministry of Defense (BMVg), and The Federal Office of Defense Technology and Procurement (Das Bundesamt für Wehrtechnik und Beschaffung - BWB, that is an Acquisition Agency) are in charge of procurement and cooperation. The Agency has a branch office for U.S. and Canada in Reston, Virginia. It is worth noting that Germany, while being the third world exporter of weapons, does not have huge "defense corporations", that is, large companies whose core business is weapons production, but civilian companies that produce weapons in addition to their main business. WT - Wehr Technik is a source of information on BWB activities. Germany has a quota of 11% of defense global export and, according to SIPRI data, between 2004 and 2009 German weapons export doubled.

=== Greece ===
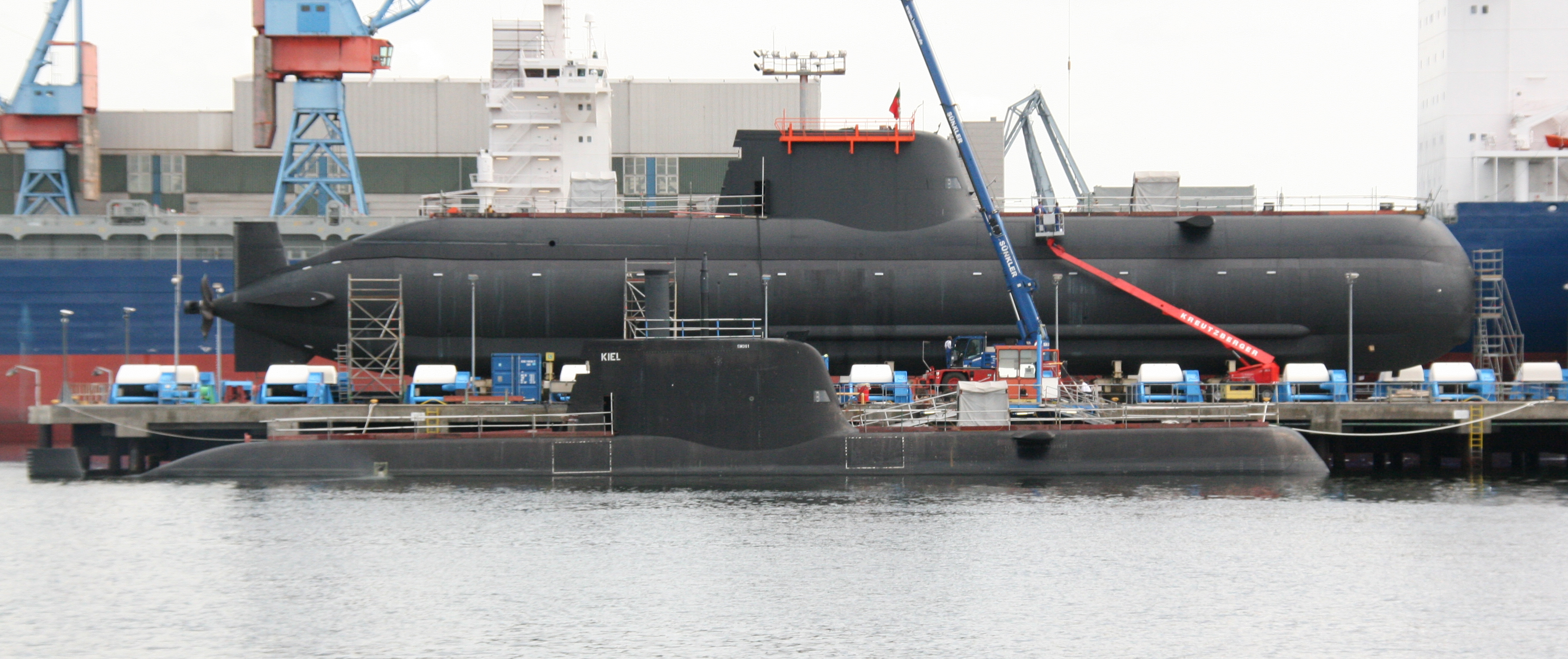
German submarines HDW-214 for Greece (Papanikolis) and Portugal (Tridente)

Offset regulation is in the official Procurement Law, 3433/2006. The Hellenic Ministry of National Defense is in charge through the department of General Armaments Directorate (GAD), and the Division of Offsets (DO). The threshold for offset request is EUR10 million. The minimum offset requirement is between 80 and 120%. Multipliers are from 1 to 10. Greece does not accept indirect offsets, since it is focused on the strengthening of its military capabilities. According to SIPRI data for 2006–2010, Greece is the 5th weapons importer of the world, with a global quota of 4%, about half of India (9%), and two-thirds of China's import (6%). It is worth noting that Chinese GDP is about 20 times bigger than Greece's nominal GDP. Greece is the major EU importer of weapons and the first U.S. defense client in the European Union. According to K. Vasileios, editor of EPICOS, "currently, there are 122 open offset contracts that were signed between 1997 and 2010 but have not been executed due to various issues."

=== Hungary ===
The offset legal base is a Government Decree 228/2004 and offset authority is the Ministry for National Development and Economy - Directive No. 23/2008. The threshold is HUF1 billion (3.5 Mil Euro) with a minimum offset requirement of 100%. Multipliers can go up to 15. The confidentiality clause on offsets is essentially commercial, as a normal Non-Disclosure Agreement.

=== Japan ===
No formal offset policy. Japan Defense Agency (JDA) depended directly on the Prime Minister and was in charge of defense procurement, thorough the Bureau of Equipment and the Bureau of Finance. However, since 2007 the Japan Defense Agency (JDA) has been transformed into a full Ministry of Defense, with a minister in cabinet-level decisions. Most of the Japanese defense import is from U.S., and it is regulated by bilateral agreements. The majority of defense bidding goes through the representation of Japanese trading companies, though direct bidding is theoretically possible. There is an unspoken policy for the largest Japanese companies that is an understood as "Buy Japanese" products policy. Two remarks: Japan, Germany and Italy, in spite of evident cultural differences, have similar political attitudes in "balancing" foreign weapons procurements. But Japan, in the name of political principles and then of official laws, restrained itself on weapon exports, and since the 1970s Japanese defense industry is self-confined to Japanese domestic market.

=== India ===
India introduced its defence offset policy under the Defence Procurement Procedure in 2005. Under the Defence Acquisition Procedure (DAP) 2020, offset provisions applied to qualifying acquisitions in the “Buy (Global)” category with an estimated cost of ₹2,000 crore or more, generally requiring offset obligations equivalent to 30% of the acquisition cost, subject to the procedure's conditions and exemptions. In July 2026, India's Public Accounts Committee reported on the implementation of defence offsets and recommended changes to their scope and administration. A draft Defence Acquisition Procedure 2026 was released for public comment in February 2026; the final status of the draft and the future of the offset provisions should be confirmed before describing any proposed changes as adopted.

=== Israel ===
Ministry of Industry, Trade and Labor is in charge of the offset policy and implementation. Threshold is US$100,000. Minimum offset request is 35%, multipliers are either 1 or 2. The main point about Israel and its offset policy is the fact that Israel has been for a long time the largest beneficiary of United States Foreign Military Financing (FMF), getting more than 50% of the entire available U.S. FMF budget. This condition sets a limit to Israeli offsets request to U.S.

=== Italy ===
There is no public law on offsets. There is not even an official name for the offset policy. The public position is that Italy has no general offset policy, just ad hoc (offset) policies. The National Armament Directorate of Ministry of Defense is in charge of offsets, while specific internal commissions of each branch of the Italian Armed Forces (Aviation, Army, and Navy) monitor offset fulfillment. The threshold for offset is 5 million Euro. The minimum offset request is 70%, but generally goes up to 100%. The highest multiplier is 3. The focus is on export opportunities for Italian defense companies. There is no website or web-page for a nameless offset program, the closest would be the Minister of Defense website.

=== Kuwait ===
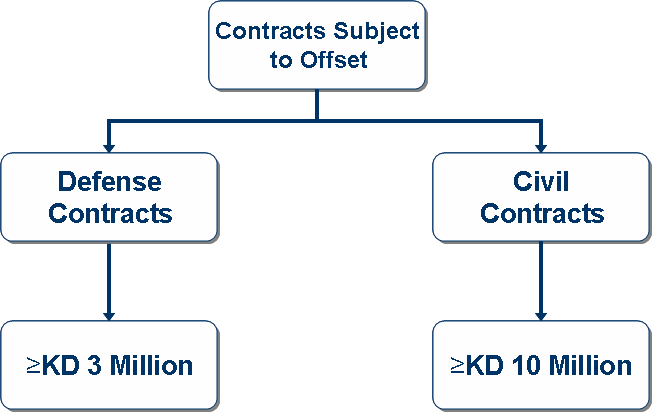
Kuwait Offset Program

New Guidelines for Kuwait Offset Program were published in 2007, following to a Minister of Finance directive, that regards all foreign procurements related to both military and non military contracts. The National Offset Company (NOC) is a state-owned company, and its activities in the Kuwait Offset Program are on behalf of the Ministry of Finance. The offset commitment is still at 35% of the monetary value of military contracts. Threshold is KD 3m, (for civilian contracts is KD 10m.) Since 2007 there have been fundamental changes, making offsets requirements more effective and complex, including the multipliers systems, with more attention on the tangible benefits for Kuwait.

=== Lithuania ===
Resolution No. 918/03 of the Government of the Republic of Lithuania (15-7-03). The Ministry of Economy is in charge of offsets. The threshold is LTL 5 million, about 1.5 million euro. Minimum offset requirement of 100%. Multipliers are between 1 and 5.

=== Morocco ===
Morocco, has yet no Offset policy. The only existing offset agreement has been signed with Alstom which won the contract to build Morocco's high-speed train system and which is also responsible for the construction of tram networks in Rabat and Casablanca. In January the company signed an agreement with the government that will see it establish a local production base for cabling and electronic components, creating 5000 jobs over 10 years, as well as establishing a rail sector training institute. Alstom also signalled its intention to step up purchases from Moroccan suppliers and service providers (such as local back-office offshoring services), for use in projects in other countries as well. To stimulate its industry, the government is working on a new procurement offset (compensation industrielle) policy. Under the policy reportedly being developed by the minister for industry and trade, foreign companies that win government tenders worth more than Dh200m (€17.69m) will be obliged to carry out local investments and purchases worth at least 50% of the value of the contracts. The measure is intended to boost the local industrial sector by ensuring that foreign companies invest locally, use local subcontractors and locally made products, and transfer technology to the country. The policy will not affect US companies, as the 2004 US-Morocco free trade agreement bars the imposition of such requirements on US firms. Since its election in 2012 as President of the CGEM Confédération générale des entreprises du Maroc, Miriem Bensaleh Chaqroun has been lobbying for the creation of a legal framework making mandatory for state controlled companies, offices, local authorities to sign offset agreements. The action was the creation of the commission compensation industrielle et accès aux marchés publics in 2012 which was headed by the former CEO of the CGEM Mehdi El Idrissi. The commission published in 2014 a Guide de la compensation industrielle in order to explain to them the concept of Offset agreements. In 2015 the CGEM made a series of proposition to the government, including the creation of an agency of the offset. The role of this agency would be:

1. To be the sole interlocutor in the development of offset contracts.
2. To guide foreign businesses to feasible projects in collaboration with Moroccan companies and sectors to promote and encourage industrial activities based on the industrial policy and the competitive advantages of the country.
3. To measure the chances of success of projects and help develop contracts that will bind the foreign company with the Moroccan suppliers.
4. To monitor and evaluate the implementation of offset projects.

=== Netherlands ===
The Ministry of Economic Affairs - Commissariat for Military Production (CMP) is in charge of offset policy and implementation (following to a protocol of agreement with the Ministry of Defense). The threshold for offset is EUR 5 million. Minimum offset requirement of 100% . Multipliers are between 1 and 5. The focus is on innovation and marketing support and it is directed by the Ministry of Economic Affairs. Guidelines to an Industrial Benefits and Offsets Program in the Netherlands are available.

=== Norway ===
Norwegian Ministry of Defense has the responsibility for Industrial Cooperation Agreements (ICA) and the supervision of the agreements during their implementation. The offset threshold of contract value is usually NOK 50 million, (about 5.5 Million Euro). The required offset quantity is 100% of the contract value and multipliers are from 1 to 5. Note: Norway is not part of European Union, but has joined the European Defense Agency with no voting rights. The guidelines of procurement and offsets can be found at online.

=== Poland ===
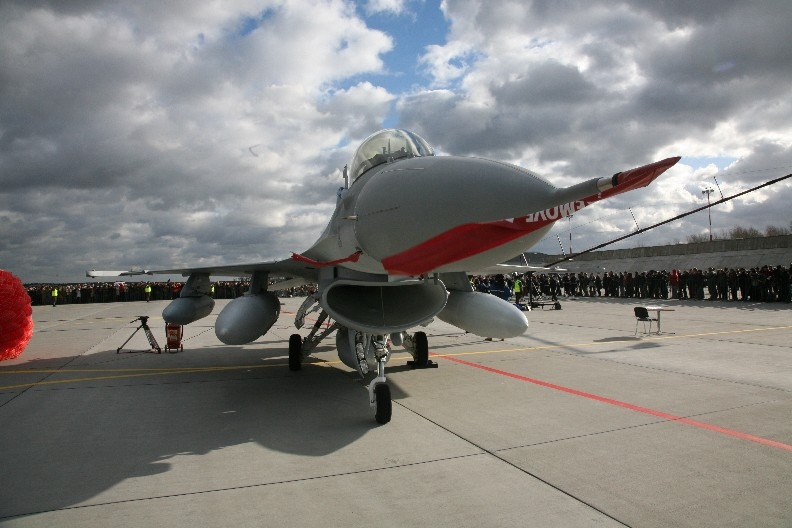
Polish F-16 "Hawk"

Ministry of Economy is in charge of offset. Polish Offset Law was issued in 1999; Offset regulations were approved in 1996 and revised in 2007. The threshold value for offsets is 5 million Euro and the request is for 100% of offset. Multipliers are between 2.0 and 5.0. Direct offsets for country's defense industry and opening of new export markets are Polish priorities. In 2003 Lockheed Martin sold 48 F-16 fighters to Poland for 3,5 billion USD via FMS. The Program is called Peace Sky, and it is financed with a U.S. FMF of 3,8 Billion USD for 15 years. Lockheed Martin offered an offset package to Poland of US$6 Billion in U.S. business investments. Polish officials called the agreement "the deal of the century." The value of the offset is 170% of the contract price. The Baltimore Sun reported that "such side deals have long been criticized in Washington as a form of kickback that defies the natural forces of free trade, including when Duncan Hunter called offsets "economic bribes" during a hearing on Capitol Hill this summer (2004)." Rick Kirkland, Lockheed Martin V.P. replied: "It's part of the price of international business, if we couldn't offer them an acceptable package of offsets, they wouldn't be buying an American airplane. It's that simple."

=== Portugal ===
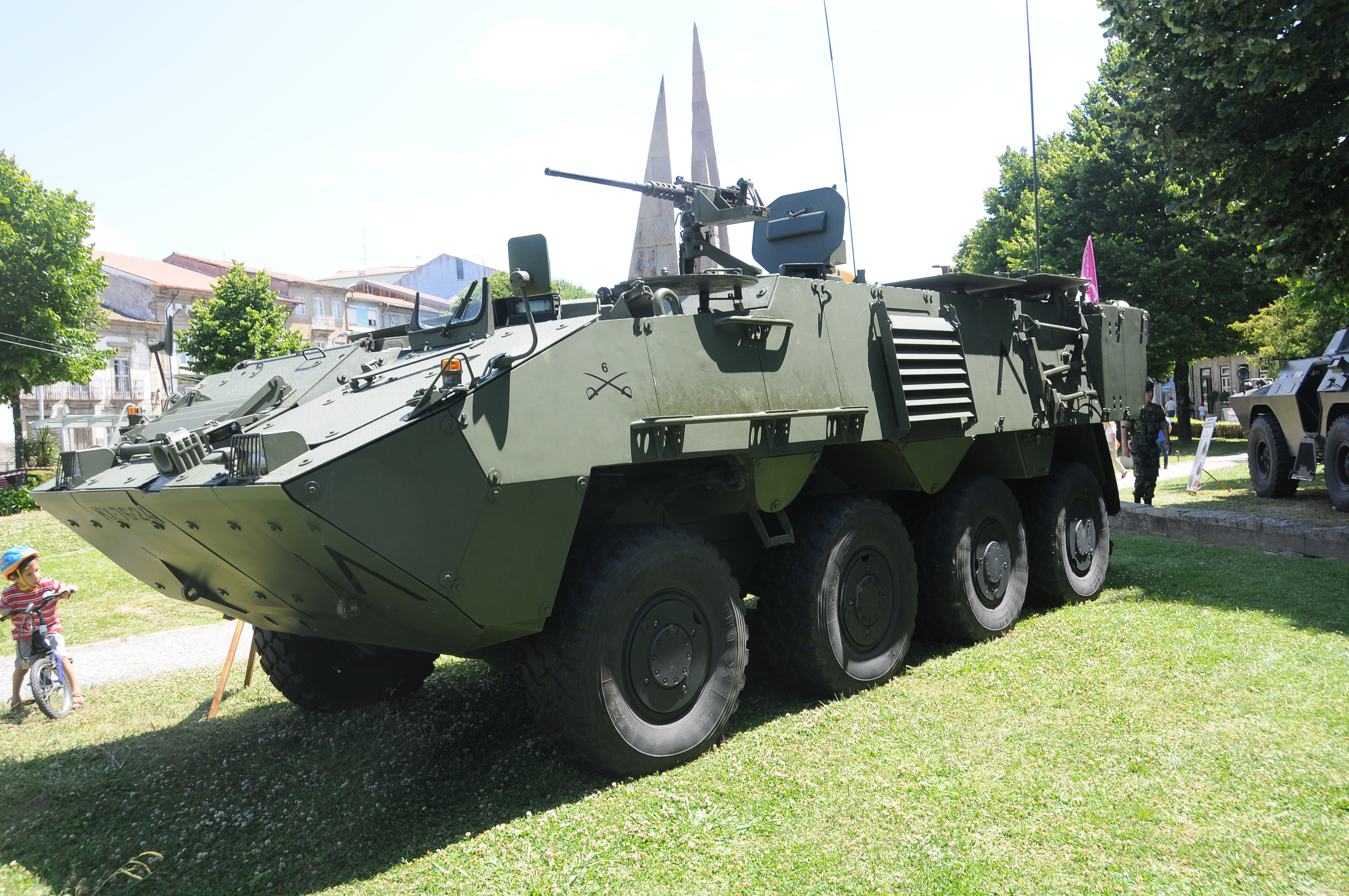
Portuguese Pandur II

Defense Minister's directive on Contrapartidas (offsets) has been issued in 2002. Decree-Law 153/2006 and 154/2006 regulates Portuguese Contrapartidas. The Permanent Commission on Offsets (CPC) is a government agency, which depends on the Ministries of Defense and of Economy, and it is in charge of negotiating and supervising offsets. The threshold is 10 million Euro and the minimum offset request is 100%. Multipliers have been set between 1 and 5 in 2006. There is no preference with regard to direct or indirect offsets. In 2005 the Portuguese government signed a deal worth 364 M euros to acquire 260 Pandur II armored vehicle from General Dynamics. The Portuguese Pandur II includes an associated offset agreement for a value of 516 M euro. Patria, the only competitor of General Dynamics, was excluded on technical reasons in 2004. Patria unusually appealed the Portuguese Government's decision in court, complaining that General Dynamics's offset package - decisive for the assignment of the contract - was a fake. The Portuguese tender was the first of many in a European commercial war between Patria and General Dynamics, almost exclusively played on offsets and that ended in 2008 with the arrest of Jorma Witakorpi, Patria's CEO, for the Patria case in Slovenia.

=== Qatar ===
Qatar has no official offset policy but foreign Defense Companies involved with the Qatar Ministry of Defense are encouraged to invest and to build partnership in R&D and Education in Qatar.

=== Romania ===
Ministry of National Defense and an Agency for Special Offset Techniques are in charge, and Law 336/2007 regulates offsets. Romania requests offset for defense purchase above 3 million Euro, and the minimum amount of offset proposals is 80% of the contract value. Multipliers can go to 5. Indirect offset are accepted, especially in ecology and shipbuilding. Romania is the only EU country that did not sign the EU Code of Conduct on Offsets (July 2009)

=== Saudi Arabia ===
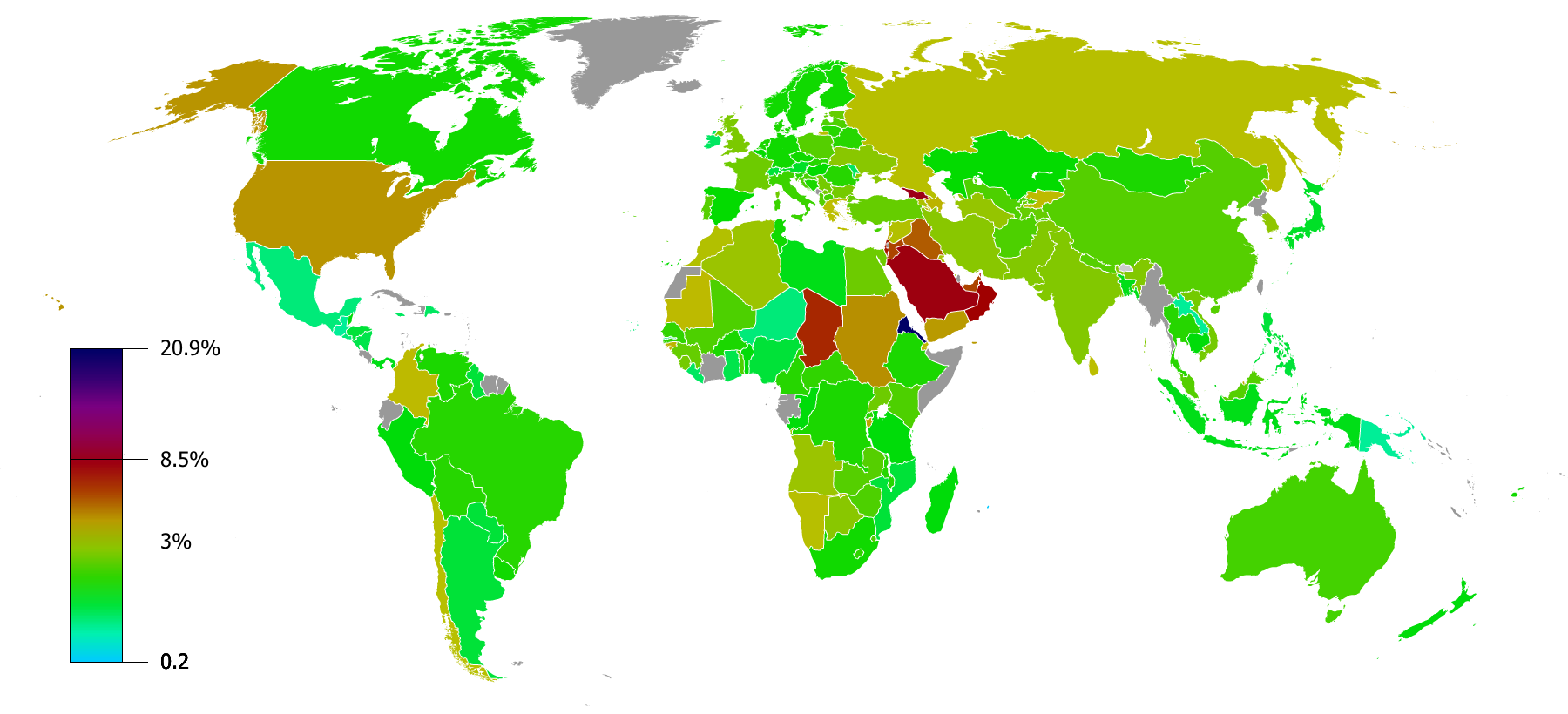
Saudi Arabia and the Gulf Defense Offset Market in the world (source: SIPRI)

Saudi Economic Offset Program is under the Deputy Minister of Defense. Saudi offset request is that 35% of their contract value is invested in Saudi jobs creation and training, economic diversification, technology transfer and foreign direct investments in general. Threshold is 400 million Saudi Reals (US$107 million). UK and France have established bilateral offset program with Saudi Arabia. UK Al Yamamah Economic Offset Program (I, II and III) is the most complex and longest program; it began in 1987 and remains in effect. The French Offset is directed by Societe Francaise d'Exportation de Systemes Avances (SOFRESA), a private company operating on behalf of the French government. The U.S., in spite of the fact the most of its defense sales to the Kingdom are U.S. Defense Department Foreign Military Sales, leaves offsets to the private contractors, such as Lockheed Martin, SAIC, Boeing, and General Dynamics. Foreign Direct Investments are authorized and supervised by SAGIA, and they receive high multipliers according to the most strategic sectors and the Kingdom's priorities (such as water, electricity, communications, etc.). Saudi's offset market has an enormous significance for the Saudi non-oil economy since Saudi Arabia spends about 10% of its GDP in defense procurement.

=== Slovakia ===
Ministry of Economy is the governing body for offsets. The threshold (not established clearly) can go down to 130,000 euro. The amount of offset proposal is negotiable, but usually is equivalent to 100% of the contract value. Higher multipliers are for direct offsets.

=== Slovenia ===
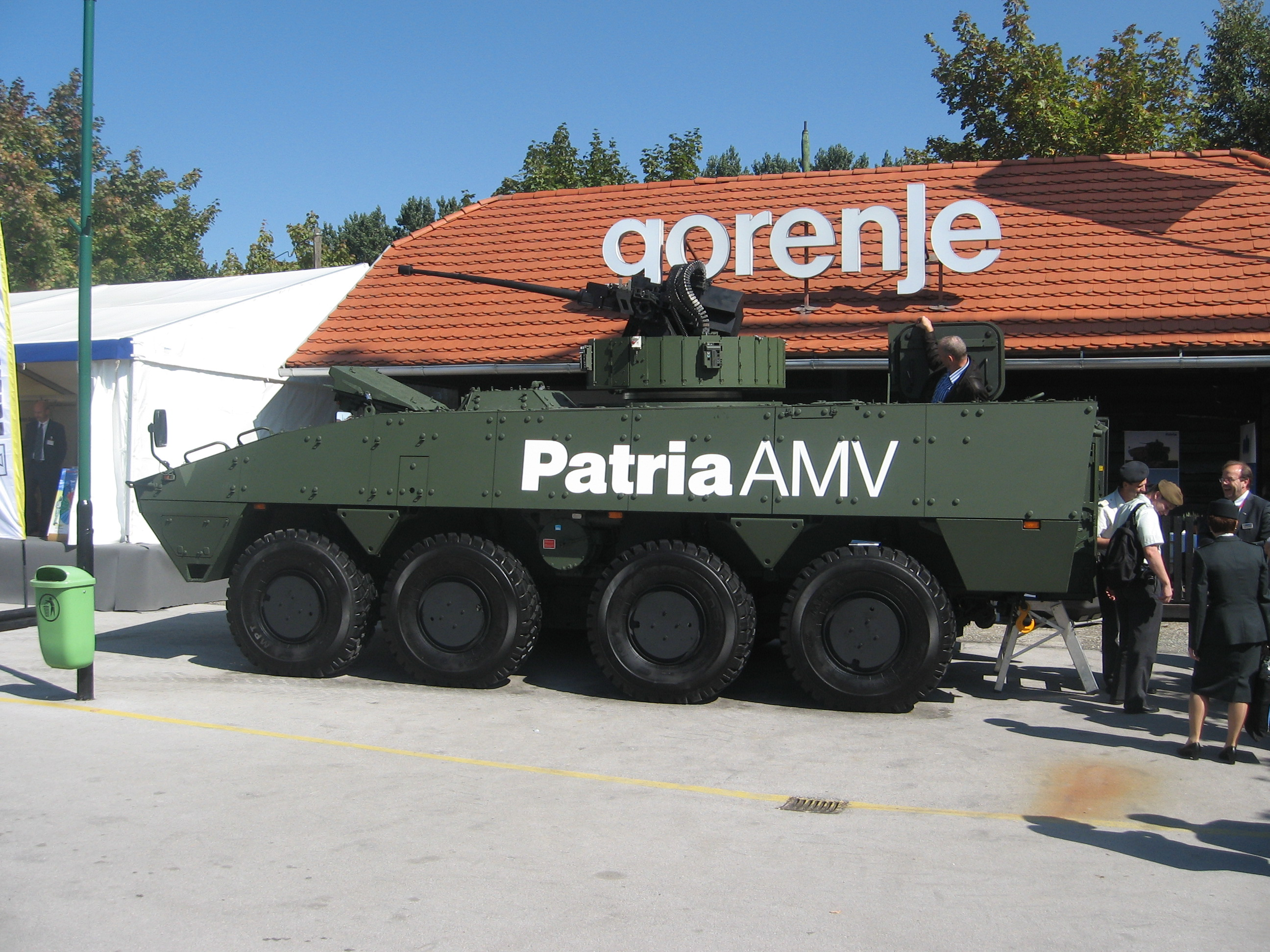
Slovenian Patria AMV

Ministry of Defense is in charge, and offset guidelines were issued in 2000. The threshold is around 500,000 Euro, and the offset request is of 100% of the contract value. Multipliers go from 1 to 7. Foreign Direct Investments and technology transfers have the highest multipliers. The 2006 purchase of 135 Patria AMV infantry fighting vehicles is the largest in Slovenian history of military procurement (278 million Euro, deliveries 2007–2013), and the Patria case is the political controversy over claims of bribery of Slovenian officials by the Finnish company Patria. According to Jorma Witakorpi, Patria CEO at the time of the sale, a kickback of about 21 M Euro (7,5% of the total contract price) has been paid to decision makers, Slovenian politicians and military, to further the sale. The Patria AMV vehicles offset agreement has direct offset for 30% of the value of the contract (co-production of the AMV in Slovenia), and 70% of indirect offsets, mostly assistance to export for Slovenian companies.

=== South Korea ===
The Defense Acquisition Program Administration (DAPA) is in charge of country offset policy, that was published in 2008. Threshold is US$10 million. The minimum required offset is 10% for non-commercial trade and 50% for commercial trade. Multipliers are between 1 and 6. The contractual Memorandum of Understanding on offsets is a substantial part of the main contract.

=== Spain ===
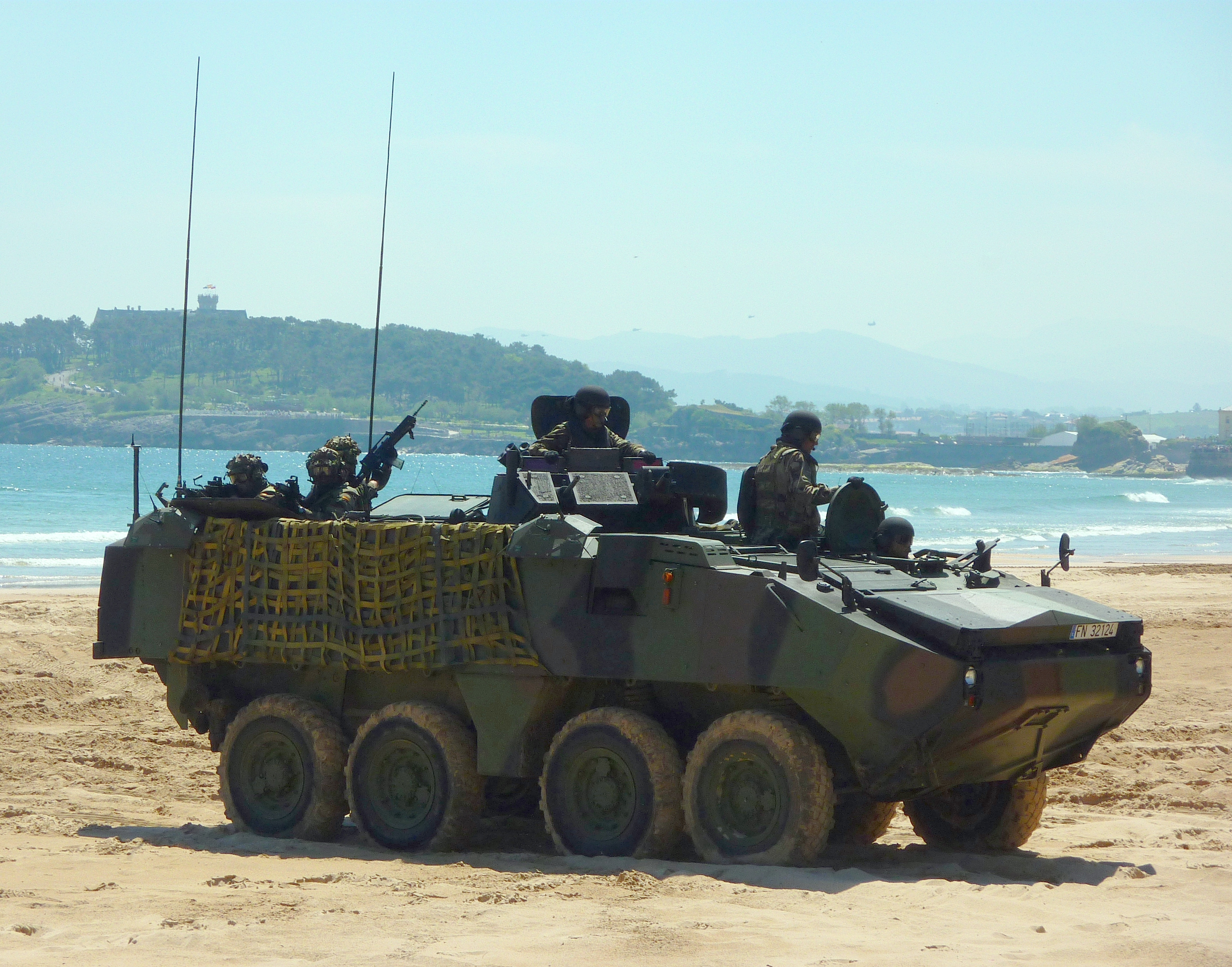
Piranha III - Spanish Army

Ministry of Defense - General Direction of Armaments and Material (DGAM) - Industrial Cooperation Agency of Spain (ICA) is responsible for the negotiation and the supervision of offsets. The guidelines for offset are not public, but issued by the Minister of Defense through internal and confidential procedures. The general request is 100% of the contract value. Multipliers are between 2 and 5.

=== Sweden ===
The offset policy was issued by the Government in 1999. The Industrial Participation program is directed by Minister of Defense, Defence Material Administration (FMV), and offset guidelines were issued in 2002. The contract value offset threshold is about 10 million Euro. The request for offset is 100%. Multipliers can be applied only to 10% of the total offset value. Only defense related offsets (direct offsets) are accepted, since Sweden applies art. 346 of the European Treaty of Lisbon.

=== Switzerland ===
The Federal Department of Defence, Civil Protection and Sport, division "armasuisse" is in charge of offsets. The threshold for offset request is 15 million Swiss Francs. The offsets are minimum 100% and multipliers are between 2 and 3.

=== Turkey ===
The Minister of Defense through an undersecretary for the Defense Industries is in charge of the Industrial Participation / Offset Directive (2007). The threshold is about US$5 million. The minimum required offset is 50%. Multipliers are between 1 and 6. The offset fulfillment time is 2 years, which is unusually short. Mostly interested in direct offsets such as technology transfer and license production for the development of the Turkish defense industry.

=== United Arab Emirates ===
The United Arab Emirates Offset Program Bureau (OFFSET) is in charge of offsets; chairman of the bureau is the Crown Prince of Abu Dhabi. The criteria are more sophisticated than most offset policies. The request for offset is 60% of the contract value. The offset credit is not evaluated on the investments, but through profit over time of an offset venture (a kind of multiplier ex post). Joint ventures in the UAE and partnership with local companies are the most common offset proposal, as direct and indirect offset.

=== United Kingdom ===
No official Policy. The Ministry of Defence is in charge, but offsets go through UKTI, UK Trade & Investment, under the Minister of State for Trade, Investment and Business. In 2007 the Prime Minister announced a change, transferring responsibility for defense trade from the Defence Export Services Organization (DESO) to UK Trade and Investment (UKTI). Since April 2008 UKTI DSO (Defence & Security Organization) has responsibility for supporting both defense and security exports. The general threshold is 10 million GBP, but through bilateral agreements with Germany and France, has been reciprocally set to 50 million GBP. The offset is generally around 100%, no multipliers.

=== United States ===
The U.S. is formally against offsets. To date, the U.S. is the only country that prohibits government officials and employees, as well as Government agencies, to get involved in any offset business. U.S. depends on foreign defense "prime" contractors for less than 2% of its defense procurement. However, many countries consider the Buy American Act practically equivalent to the offset policies of other countries.

== Criticism of offset agreements ==
While widely practiced, some, such as the US government, consider such agreements to be "market distorting and inefficient". On April 16, 1990, a US Presidential Policy statement was released, stating that "the decision whether to engage in offsets [...] resides with the companies involved" and that "no agency of the U.S. Government shall encourage, enter directly into, or commit U.S. firms to any offset arrangement in connection with the sale of defense goods or services for foreign governments."

== EU position on defense offsets ==
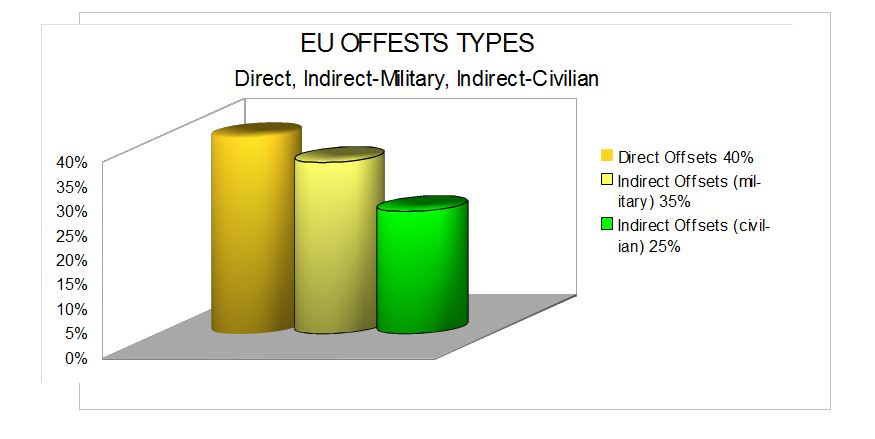
EU Offset types

The most recent common European Union quasi-agreement on defense offsets is The Code of Conduct on Offsets, signed by all EU countries (with the exception of Romania and Denmark) in October 2008. The primary purpose of the voluntary and non-binding Code is to promote a "European Defense Technological and Industrial Base" and to outline a road map to arrive to a complete elimination of offset practices within the domestic EU market. In other words, to open to competitive bids the EU Defense and Security market and to overcome competition restrictions of EU Treaties of Rome and Lisbon, art. 346. The ideal goal is "competition in the EU Defense Market" and "Government-to-Government off-the-shelf sales." The realistic target is humbler, though: to self-restrain and limit the offset quantity to 100% of the contract value.

The actual situation in EU is described in detail in a study on defense offsets in the Union countries commissioned by the European Defense Agency and published in 2007. According to this study the volume of EU offset agreements in 2006 was above 4-5 billion euro. The distribution of these offsets is as shown in the diagram: Direct Offsets, Military Indirect Offsets, Civilian Indirect Offsets.

European policy on offsets is still regulated by the Treaty establishing the European Community. Art. 223 of the Treaty of Rome (1958), then article 296 of the EU Treaty of Amsterdam (1999); since December 2009, the Treaty of Lisbon (art. 346) protects member States weapons production and trade from competition rules of the common European market. In spite of 50 years of European history Article 223 (Rome) and Article 346 (Lisbon) are practically identical. Today the hinge of EU policy on offsets is still the same article, that is, Art. 346 of the Lisbon Treaty. This article preserves the national right to the secret of state related to its own security and military production and procurement. This is the relevant part of Article 346:

1. The provisions of this Treaty shall not preclude the application of the following rules:

(b) any Member State may take such measures as it considers necessary for the protection of the essential interests of its security which are connected with the production of or trade in arms, munitions and war material; such measures shall not adversely affect the conditions of competition in the common market regarding products which are not intended for specifically military purposes.

— Art 346 Treaty of Lisbon

The first part of the article states that European Union has no authority over national states policies and decisions on their defense/security choices. In other words, EU has no saying about domestic preference for homemade planes or tanks, or for preferred military offsets choice. The second part, however, asserts a shared principle by all EU states regarding the non-military/indirect offsets, that is, EU reserves its right to supervise and regulate indirect-non-military offset effects, so that they do not "adversely affect the condition of competition" in the internal common EU market.

Any civilian-indirect-offset has distortion effects in the common market, and this distortion is amplified by the ignorance about specific offset agreements outside the circle of defense contractors and national authorities. U.S. started monitoring offsets adverse effects in United States when a small paper-making equipment company in Wisconsin (Beloit Corporation) got in trouble without understanding that the reason was a hidden cause, that is, an indirect offset by Northrop (now Northrop Grumman) with the Finnish Ministry of Defense. Only a concerned Wisconsin politician, Sen. Russell D. Feingold, discovered the real reasons in 1992, after being informed that a tender for supply of machinery of the value about 50M USD was not awarded to the Wisconsin company, but to a Finnish company (Valmet Corporation) as part of an offset deal with the Finnish Government.

This U.S. offset story brought to light the issue of the impact of confidential agreements by defense companies on U.S. non-military business, in some instances with devastating effects. Feingold's discovery is enlightening for the EU common market as well, where interferences and adverse impacts on EU companies are allowed by an unjustified national attitude for confidentiality or secrecy on indirect, non military, offset deals. Art. 346 of Lisbon Treaty, written more than 50 years ago, is there to wisely avoid disruptive effects caused by unjustified military secrecy in civilian offsets in the common European market. In EU market of Defense, approximately of the size of $250B, with 27 sovereign state authorities that can claim secret of state -from Germany to Cyprus and Luxembourg-, there is a potential for indirect non-military offsets of $60B, that is, more 1000 times the distortion problem caused by Northrop (and the Finnish Ministry of Defense) to Beloit.

== Offset associations and publications ==
The two main global organizations in the USA that deal with offsets are:

- G.O.C.A - Global Offset and Countertrade Association is a main source of information on the uses of counter-trade and offset.
- DMA - Defence Manufacturers Association, based in UK but opened to many other countries.

One domestic U.S. based organization that deals with offsets is:

- DIOA - Defense Industrial Offset Association, membership is primarily open to U.S. based defense contractors.

In Europe, ECCO (European Club for Countertrade and Offset) hosts two symposiums a year and started publishing various volumes that explains offset in various domains, such as finance, ethics, the economy, and international law.

There are many regional or national offset conferences and symposiums, but recently GOCA and DMA jointly organize global offset meetings every two years. The first global meeting on offset took place in 2004 in Sintra, Portugal; then in Athens, Greece (2006); the third in Seville, Spain, in 2008. GOCA and DIOA hold both individual and joint conferences several times per year.

Countertrade & Offset is a fortnightly magazine on the offset industry; the same publisher has also a quarterly for the industry: The Offset Guidelines Quarterly Bulletin.

A thesis that focuses on offset in the European Union and Directove 2009/81/EC, can be downloaded from www.furterdefence.com

== Bibliography ==
- Arrowsmith, S. (2003) Government Procurement in the WTO (Kluwer Law International: London) ISBN 90-411-9884-9
- Axelson, M. with James, A. (2000) The Defense Industry and Globalization, FOA-R-00-01698-179-SE (Stockholm: Division of Defence Analysis)
- Brauer, J and Dunne, P, (2004). Arms Trade and Economic Development, Theory, policy and cases in arms offsets, Routledge, London. ISBN 0-415-33106-4
- Correa, Gilberto Mohr. Resultados da Política de Offset da Aeronáutica: Incremento nas Capacidades Tecnológicas das Organizações do Setor Aeroespacial Brasileiro. 2017. 152f. Dissertação de mestrado em Ciências e Tecnologias Espaciais, Área Gestão Tecnológica – Instituto Tecnológico de Aeronáutica, São José dos Campos
- Gallart, JM (1996). From offsets to industrial co-operation: Spain's changing strategies as an arms importer, in Martin, S (ed), The Economics of Offsets.
- Hall, P. and Markowski, S (1994). On the normality and abnormality of offset obligations, Defence Economics, 5, 3, 173–188.
- Hartley, K, (1983), NATO Arms Co-operation, Allen and Unwin, London
- Ianakiev, Gueorgui & Nickolay E. Mladenov (2008). "Offset Policies in Defence Procurement: Lessons for the European Defence Equipment Market", Défense nationale et sécurité collective, " Hors Série: Les marchés publics de défense".
- Ianakiev, Gueorgui (2014), " Defence Offsets: Regulation and Impact on the Integration of the European Defence Equipment Market ", in Bellais, Renaud (ed) (2014), "The Evolving Boundaries of Defence: An Assessment of Recent Shifts in Defence Activities", Emerald Group Publishing Limited.
- Kaushal, V and Behera, L. (2013) Defence Acquisition: International Best Practices, Pentagon Press ISBN 978-81-8274-711-1.
- Magahy, B, Vilhena da Cunha, F., Pyman, M., Defence Offsets: Addressing The Risks Of Corruption & Raising Transparency, Transparency International, (J. Muravska and A. Wegener eds.), 2010 ISBN 978-3-935711-49-4
- Matthews, R. 2002. Saudi Arabia: Defense Offsets and Development, chapter 8 in J. Brauer and J.P. Dunne, The Arms Industry in Developing Nations: History and Post-Cold War Assessment. London: Palgrave.
- Sandler, T, Hartley, K eds, Handbook of Defense Economics, Elsevier, Amsterdam. Vol. 1, 1995, ISBN 0-444-81887-1; Vol. 2, Defense in a Globalized World 2007, ISBN 978-0-444-51910-8.
- Hartley, K (2004). Offsets and the Joint Strike Fighter in the UK and The Netherlands, in Brauer and Dunne, eds, Arms Trade and Economic Development,
- Martin, S, ed.,(1996). The Economics of Offsets, Harwood, London. ISBN 3-7186-5782-1
- Nackman, M. A Critical Examination Of Offsets In International Defense Procurements: Policy Options For The United States, Public Contract Law Journal Vol. 40, No. 2 Winter 2011
- Reich, A. (1999) International Public Procurement Law: The Evolution of International Regimes on Public Purchasing (Kluwer Law International: London) ISBN 90-411-9685-4
- Russin, Richard J., Offsets in International Military Procurement, Public Contract Law Journal. Fall 1994
- Taylor, T (2004). Using procurement as a development strategy, in Brauer, J and Dunne, P (eds)
- Udis, B and Maskus, KE (1991). Offsets as industrial policy: Lessons from aerospace, Defence Economics, 2,2, 151–164.
- U.S. DoC (2007). Offsets in Defense Trade, Eleventh Report to Congress, U.S. Department of Commerce, Washington, DC.
- U.S. DoC (2011). Offsets in Defense Trade, Fifteenth Report to Congress, U.S. Department of Commerce, Washington, DC
- Welt, L., Wilson D.(1998) Offsets in the Middle East, Middle East Policy, Vol. 6, No. 2, pp. 36–53

== See also ==
- Agreement on Government Procurement
- Al Yamamah
- Arms industry
- Canadian Arms trade
- Counter trade
- Defense contractor
- Defense Security Cooperation Agency
- European Defence Agency
- List of countries by military expenditures
- List of United States defense contractors
- Offset loan
- Patria case
- Portuguese Pandur
- Quid pro quo
- Trade pact
