= Patria case =

Bribery scandal in Slovenia, Finland and Austria

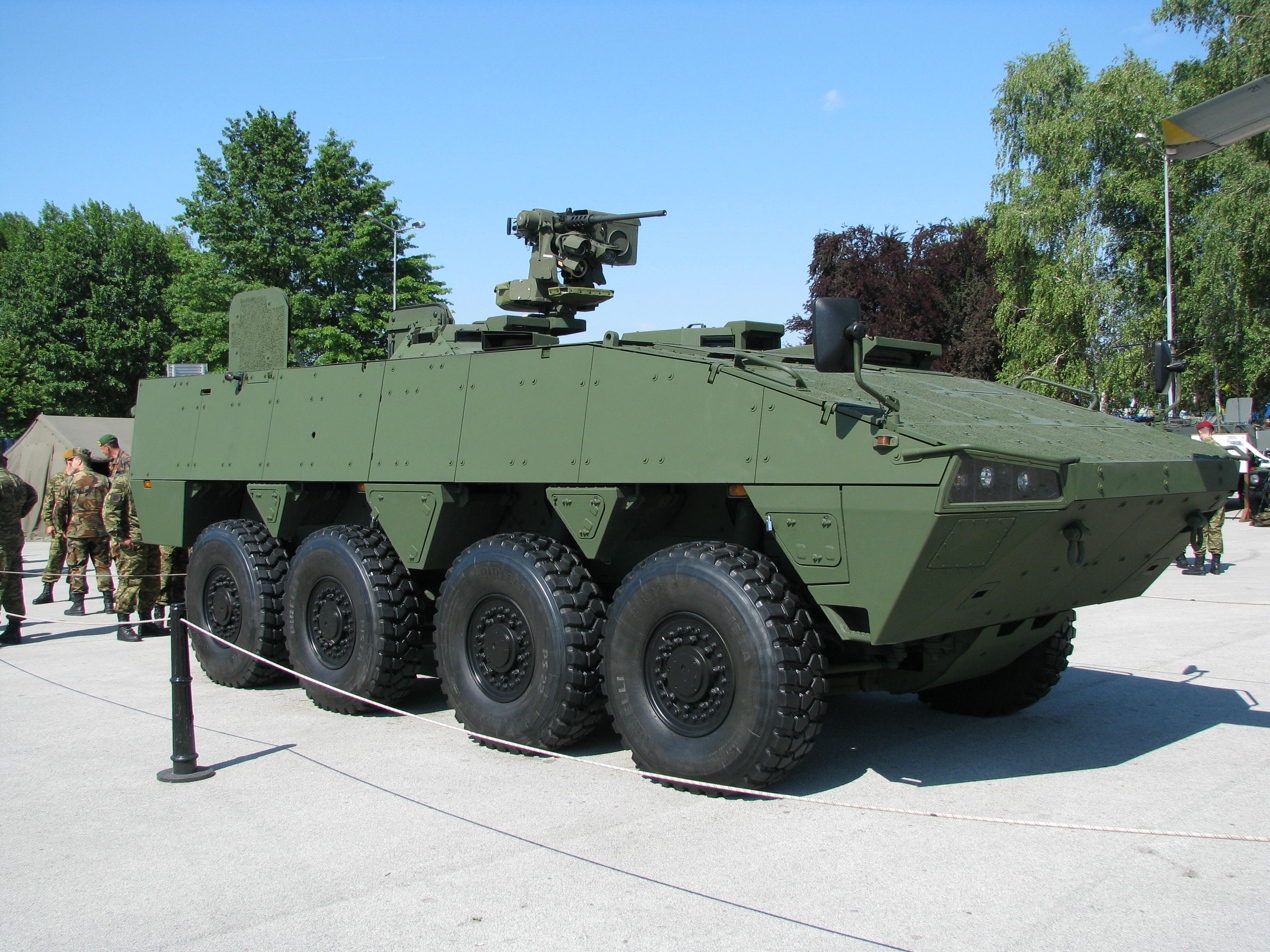
Patria AMV

The Patria case was a political controversy surrounding claims by prosecutors in Slovenia and Austria alleging bribery of Slovenian officials by the Finnish company Patria to help secure an armoured personnel carrier order. Criminal investigations in Slovenia, Finland, and Austria concluded in the mid-2010s. While several individuals were initially convicted, most of these verdicts were later overturned or dismissed. In Finland, all defendants were acquitted due to insufficient evidence. In Slovenia, convictions against key political figures, including Janez Janša, were annulled by the Constitutional Court, and the case was dropped after the statute of limitations expired in 2016. Austria, however, secured one conviction against a middleman involved in the bribery scheme. The CEO stepped down from his position as a result of the affair, but Finnish courts later acquitted all Patria executives due to insufficient evidence. In early September 2008, just three weeks before the Slovenian parliamentary elections on 21 September 2008, the Finnish broadcasting company YLE published an investigation implicating the corruption of the Slovenian Prime Minister Janez Janša.

Janša, who ignored and attacked also the other report about him published in 2013 by the official Commission for the Prevention of Corruption of the Republic of Slovenia, rejected all accusations and called for the journalists to advance some proof for their claims or to withdraw the accusations. On 11 September 2011, the Slovenian national broadcaster RTV Slovenia published a document disproving the claim about Janez Janša being implicated in the corruption and implicating Bartol Jerković, the director of the Croatian heavy industrial company Đuro Đaković Specijalna vozila.

== Background ==
The Patria case has a European and NATO horizon, and it cannot be understood outside this horizon. First, the rush to modernize the infantry armored vehicles for most Western armies since 2002. Second, the consolidation of the European armored vehicles suppliers through General Dynamics acquisitions. Third, the commercial war between General Dynamics and Patria in this field. Last, the peculiar status of arms deals that implies state secret protection on arms trade and on their collateral agreements. However, the abuse of secrecy to conceal unlawful practices such as fake offset agreement, (equivalent to bribery) is not a Slovenian issue, but a real European problem. The Patria case is a chance to look at what happens in the most politically sensitive and covered areas of Western democracies: arms and state security.

=== Modernization of infantry vehicles ===
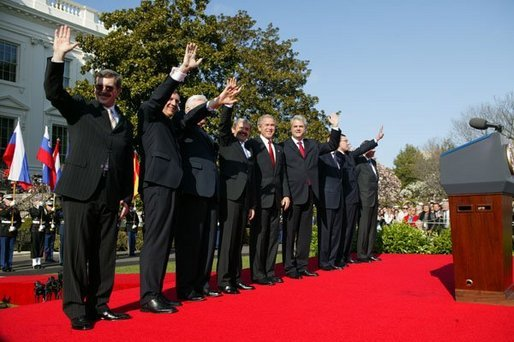
President George W. Bush welcoming 7 new states into NATO, March 29, 2004. From left are: Prime Minister Indulis Emsis of Latvia, Prime Minister Anton Rop of Slovenia, Prime Minister Algirdas Brazauskas of Lithuania, Prime Minister Mikulas Dzurinda of Slovakia, President George Bush, Prime Minister Adrian Năstase of Romania, Prime Minister Simeon Saxe-Coburg Gotha of Bulgaria, Prime Minister Juhan Parts of Estonia, and NATO Secretary General Jaap de Hoop Scheffer.

The historic decision of the U.S. Administration to move the conflict against terrorisms outside United States at the end of 2001 led to the invasion of Afghanistan and Iraq. It is a radical change: U.S. had not deployed large infantry on hostile grounds since 1983. The decision had implications for U.S. allies. Ground troops need modern types of equipment to fight new infantry wars. Modern armored vehicles become a priority: more protected, faster, easily deployable, interconnected with the new digital wars. New vehicles must be capable to inter-operate at several communication levels.

Air superiority was no longer the decisive issue. The capability to control the ground became paramount. The human cost of the new occupation wars is mainly due to infantry lack of adequate protection. More than half of the deaths of U.S. and allies is caused by inadequate armoured protection.

=== Industry consolidation: Light Armored Vehicles ===
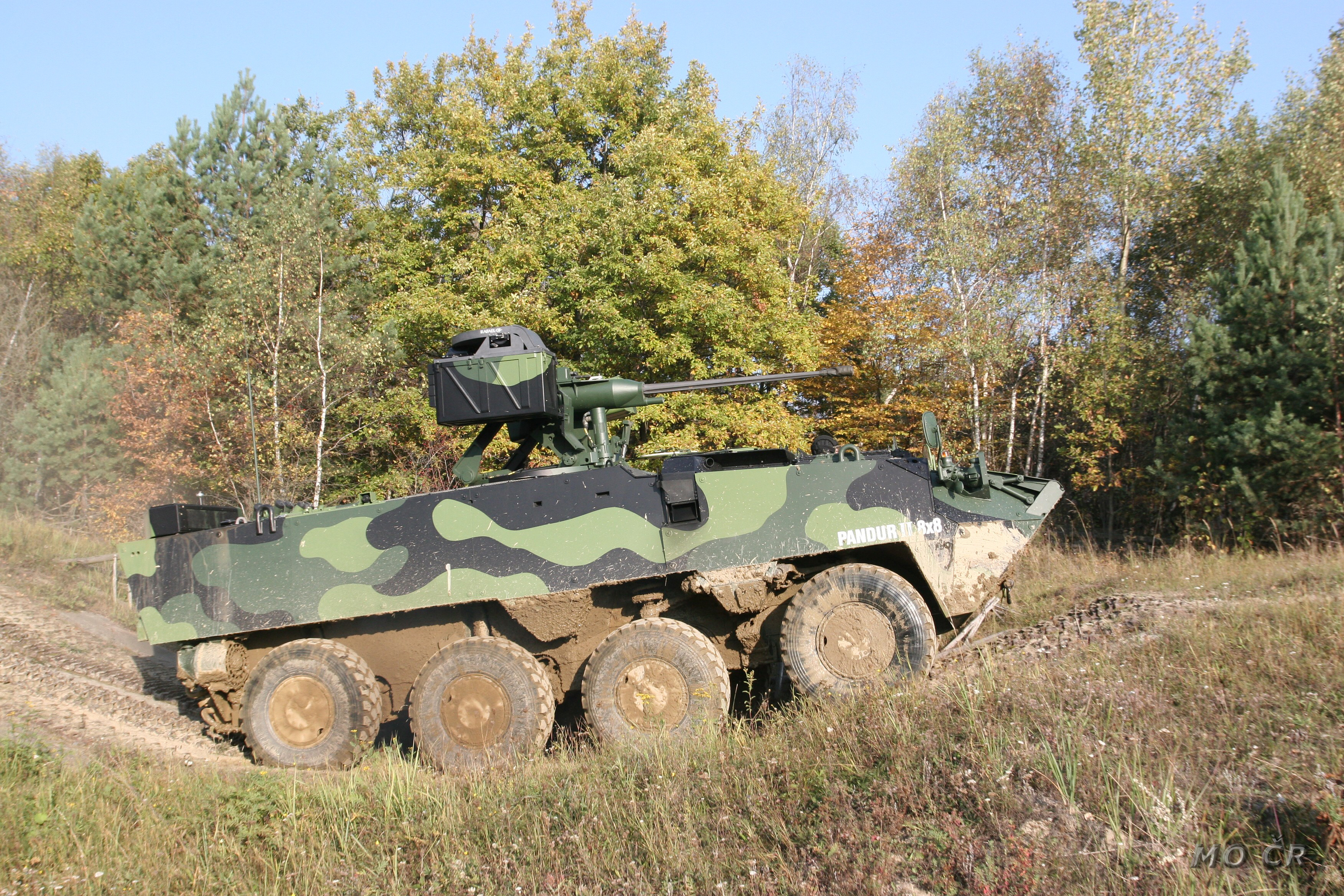
Pandur II is produced by Steyr-Daimler-Puch Spezialfahrzeuge, part of General Dynamics European Land Combat Systems, which is also the parent company of MOWAG of Switzerland and Santa Bárbara Sistemas of Spain.

General Dynamics is the U.S leader in infantry vehicles which between 2002 and 2003 purchased MOWAG in Switzerland, Steyer-Daimler-Puch Speazialfahrung in Austria, and Santa Bárbara Sistemas in Spain. In 2004, they launched a hostile takeover of Alvis plc.

=== European war between General Dynamics and Patria ===
Major European nations such as France, the UK, Germany, Italy initiated own domestic programs replacing old generation APCs with modern Armored Vehicles. Smaller nations on the other hand initiated process of international tender and procurement for new advanced armored personnel carriers. Portugal, initiated the procurement process right away.¨.

Patria and General Dynamics engaged in a competition to win over new defence contracts, notably Belgium, Portugal, where Patria was overpowered by General Dynamics persuasive influence. Patria was astonished when it was excluded from the final round in Portugal and Belgium. Patria is a small national company that produces one of the most competitive Armored Vehicles on the market. Patria's turnover in 2005 was about 300 million Euros and in 2009 reached 500 million Euro. The commercial between Patria and General Dynamics would be akin to fight between David vs. Goliath, as the later is 40 times the size of Finnish Patria.

In 2003 Patria and General Dynamics are competitors for the new Portuguese armoured vehicles. General Dynamics won the contract with the Pandur, in competition with itself, that is General Dynamics Piranha; Patria, the third competitor, was disqualified on technical reasons at the end of 2004. Patria naively appealed against the decision, and Lisbon court dismissed Patria appeal in less than 40 days (by February 2005), so Portugal could pay 365 million Euro in exchange for 260 Pandurs and 516 million (150% of the contract value) of General Dynamics offset.

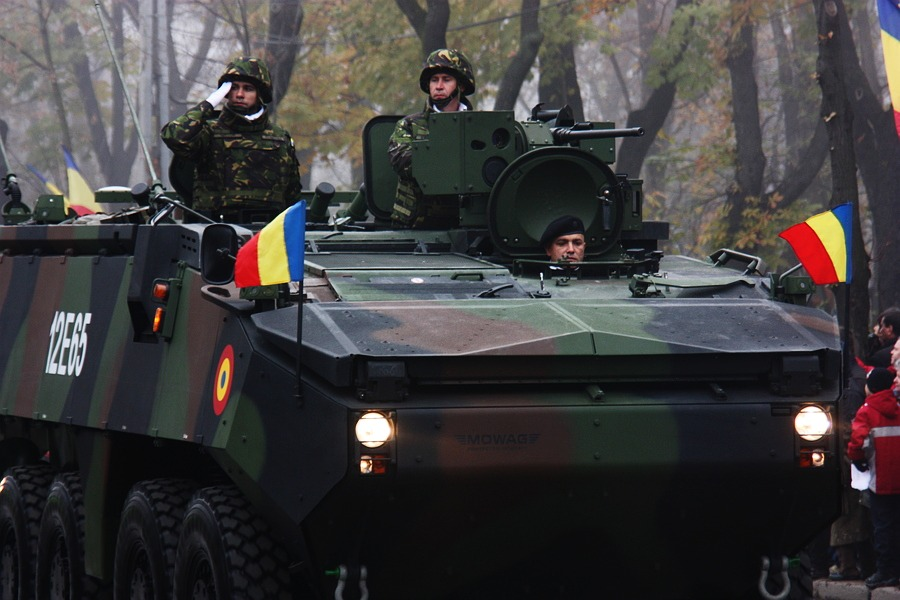
General Dynamics - MOWAG Piranha

Then in the Belgian tender in 2006 the finalists are: GD-Steyr Pandur, GD-MOWAG Piranha, Iveco Centauro, and Patria AMV. Patria lost, and General Dynamics won: about 700 million Euro for 242 General Dynamics Piranha and 700 million of GD offset, accurately divided between Flanders and Walloonia (delivery between 2007–2012).

Then Czech Republic. Defense Daily writes in Dec 2005: "As fate would have it, Steyr’s Pandur II (General Dynamics) and Patria’s AMV were the final two contenders for the Czech Republic’s $1 billion wheeled APC contract." Patria won, then the contract goes back to General Dynamics, Pandur.

Similar stories for Romania, Ireland, Denmark, Lithuania, Sweden, Spain and so on. But General Dynamics has its most conspicuous sales outside of Europe: about $6 billion of Light Armored Vehicles to Saudi Arabia National Guard, via Foreign Military Sales.

Patria had some victories against the U.S. giant: Croatia, Slovenia, Poland, Estonia. And most notably, United Arab Emirates. In 2009 Sweden canceled a contract award to Patria of $338 million for 113 Patria AMV, but restarted the contract in 2010.

=== Purchase of Patria AMV ===
In December 2006 Slovenia purchased 135 Patria AMV infantry fighting vehicles. It is the largest defense acquisition in Slovenian history of military procurement. Participants to the bid included Patria with Patria AMV and a Slovenian subsidiary of General Dynamics, Sistemska Tehnika with Valuk. The government chose the former.

== Alleged scheme ==
On 1 September 2008, the YLE's investigative program MOT stated that Patria paid 21 million euros in bribes for deals for Patria AMV IFVs for the Slovenian military. The money was said to be channelled to officials in the country's Ministry of Defence, as well as the Prime Minister Janez Janša. The program covered the ongoing criminal investigation of bribery and gross bribery by Patria officers in Egypt, Slovenia and Croatia. The accusations were said to be based on undisclosed documents which mention the initial letter J., interpreted to mean the premier Janez Janša. According to MOT, the documents were verified from multiple reliable sources. These documents were said to be published when the police investigation is completed and the case is presented to the district court. The police estimates that the investigation should be completed by the end of 2008. Furthermore, former president of the Commission for the Prevention of Corruption of the Republic of Slovenia, described the bribery as "very hard to deny" in the MOT program and stated people from the government were implicated. Later he said he was only making logical conclusions and has no proof for his claims.

According to MOT, 21 million euros, out of the 278 million total in the deal, was paid in bribes. The transfer was concealed by delivering fewer vehicles and less expensive armaments and extensions than officially announced. Money was channeled to a company held by Patria's Austrian agent, Wolfgang Riedl. Riedl would then forward the money to agents, each distributing the bribes to different groups. Businessman Walter Wolf would interact with Slovenian politicians and painter Jure Cekuta with officials at the Slovenian Ministry of Defence. Riedl transferred 2.8 million to businessman Walter Wolf, but Wolf's attempt to forward the money was stopped by his bank, which informed the Austrian money laundering unit.

== Response from Janša and the Slovenian government ==
Janša rejected all accusations, and called for the journalists to advance some proof for their claims or to withdraw the accusations. In the case they would do neither, insisting on the accusations without showing the proof, he announced to bring legal action against the journalists. The following day, the Slovenian Government decided to sue the journalists and the broadcasting company for false accusation. The Ministry of Foreign Affairs left two diplomatic notes to the Finnish Government, calling the country enable the disclosure of the documents relative to the investigation in order to bring light in the issue. On September 6 Slovenian Government communication office asked YLE director Mikael Jungner to air a "second part" of the broadcast, including the viewpoints from other people involved and effectively negating the claims made in the program. This request was declined. In a parliamentary hearing on 9 September 2008, Janša urged the members of parliament to forget the issue for now and bring it back to discussion once some proof has been advanced.

There is a clause in the deal that allows its cancellation in the case of corruption. On 5 August 2008, Patria provided the Slovenian government with an account of the criminal investigation, where Patria declared in writing that no unlawfulness has occurred in the Slovenian deal. The Slovenian government accepted the declaration and decided not to cancel the deal.

In January 2010 Janez Janša sued Magnus Berglund for 1.5 million euro for defamation in a Slovenian civil court (Novo Mesto) and Ljubljana prosecutors requested 6 months' imprisonment for Berglund.

== Finnish government position ==
So far, the Finnish government has kept a neutral stance. The state of Finland owns a majority share in Patria. The minister responsible for administration of Patria stock, Jan Vapaavuori, said that the Finnish government does not intend to issue any statements, particularly during the election period, as that would intervene in the internal affairs of Slovenia. The first diplomatic note was answered by Minister of Foreign Affairs Alexander Stubb, who stated that the government will not intervene against the journalists, in respect of the freedom of the press. Furthermore, Yle is a non-departmental body directly responsible to a parliamentary committee, not the Finnish Council of State. The second note was answered on similarly neutral terms: the Finnish Council of State will not and cannot interfere in an ongoing police investigation.

== Police investigation and trial ==
=== Finland ===
The Finnish police agency investigating the case is National Bureau of Investigation (NBI), and the case was heard at Helsinki district court. Two employees of Patria have been arrested for questioning, of which one has been officially imprisoned by the Helsinki district court and one has been released. Furthermore, Helsinki district court imprisoned an Austrian and a Slovenian businessman in absentia, and their hearings were prepared in co-operation with Austrian and Slovenian officials. However, the appeals court returned a verdict of innocence, and the prosecutor decided not to appeal it to the Supreme Court, citing lack of evidence.

The Finnish NBI criticized the actions of their Slovenian counterparts. According to NBI, the Slovenian police has not provided the information requested for the investigation. On the other hand, when NBI sent a classified list of individuals that the Slovenian police should interview, no interviews were arranged, but the secret list was leaked to the public. According to the officer in charge of the investigation, despite Slovenian police being able and willing to co-operate, the difficulties in the co-operation between the officials are already hindering the investigation.

Two Patria executives were found guilty of bribing Croatian officials between 2005 and 2008 by the Kanta-Häme District Court. The executives were given conditional sentences and the company was fined 300,000 euros. However, the case was appealed and the appeals court is due to process it in 2015.

=== Austria ===
The Austrian police suspected money laundering and other offenses, when Wolf's bank warned them about the suspicious transactions and blocked his account. The Austrian Interpol notified the Slovenian police about this but the Slovenian police ignored the notification. It replied only after more than a year, when the news about this was published in the Slovenian daily Dnevnik.

=== Slovenia ===
The Slovenian police investigation has been practically stalled, according to MOT. The Slovenian police rejected the accusations of having leaked the secret list. It also started the internal investigation of why the Interpol notification has not been answered to.

The Slovenia Times wrote on the U.S. Embassy cables:

While the antagonists in the ongoing Patria scandal wage their media war on whether Janša’s SDS was a bribe-taker or a victim of conspiracy, the cables make the US’ understanding of the matter quite clear. The May 2007 cable has Ambassador Robertson quoting a “clandestine source” that “PM Janez Janša’s SDS received more than EUR 2.8m ‘under the table’ from Patria.” Moreover another cable on a meeting with Janša reports that the politician’s “ignorance” about the details of the APCs tender “was a bit disingenuous, especially since we know that as Slovenia’s former defence minister he follows these issues”. The views of the ambassador, who adds in the same cable that “the entire Patria deal has smelled fishy from the get-go”, were explained away by SDS.

— Nothing Shocking, The Slovenia Times, 10/10/11

Slovenian prosecutors filed charges for corruption against Janez Janša on Aug 6, 2010, though Janša affirmed that he did not receive any notification. Janša denied having "requested or received any rewards or payments related to the Patria deal" in a statement on Aug 27, 2010.

=== Bribery trial in Slovenia (2011) ===
In September 2011 a bribery trial has begun in Ljubljana Court following to criminal investigations and indictments for bribery or complicity in bribery connected with the 2006 purchase of 135 Patria APC. The five defendants in the trial are: Jože Zagožen, Tone Krkovič, Janez Janša, Walter Wolf, Ivan Črnkovič.

On June 5, 2013 Liubljana District Court sentenced former Prime Minister Janez Janša to 2 years of prison for receiving bribes from Patria Oy. The co-defendants, Brigadier Tone Krkovič and Ivan Črnkovič, were sentenced to 1 year and 10 months in prison.

== European Union Art. 346 and the arms trade ==
The freedom of the press is protected as constitutional right in democratic countries. Finland takes it seriously and, in the Patria case, taught a lesson of democracy, of rule of law, and of business ethics to the world. Whether MOT's charges of bribery are true or not, Finland protected the freedom of speech better than United States, and against its own national interest. MOT report is of enormous value for the European Union and its attempt to put some democratic transparency in the European Defense procurement. The arms trade enjoys a particular status in EU, due to its essential connection with national state security, as per Art. 346 of the Lisbon Treaty:

The provisions of this Treaty shall not preclude the application of the following rules:
….(b) any Member State may take such measures as it considers necessary for the protection of the essential interests of its security which are connected with the production of or trade in arms, munitions and war material; such measures shall not adversely affect the conditions of competition in the common market regarding products which are not intended for specifically military purposes.

— Art. 346 of the Lisbon Treaty

Art. 346, while granting member states the right to classify national information on the subject, i.e., to apply the State secret to arms production and trade of member states, explicitly prohibits the use of civilian (indirect) offset as form of distortion of free competition in the common market of the European Union. Some Aerospace and Defense companies abuse of indirect offsets is equivalent to straight bribery, if not worse. This is a level more sophisticated but not different from a bribe, and it is also the level of the commercial war between Patria and General Dynamics, in which Slovenia is just one of the European battles.

There are three reasonable hypotheses on the truth or falsity of the MOT program:

1. Finland and Slovenia are corrupt countries. The rest of European countries are not. Magnus Berglund discovered the corruption, and MOT program is truthful and accurate. It looks that Slovenia is a corruptible country, while countries like Portugal or Belgium (with over one billion euro purchase) are not. Slovenian politicians accept bribes, while the rest of the military sales involving Armoured Wheeled Infantry Vehicles is bribe-free. Furthermore, Finnish companies like Patria are ethnically inclined to corrupt foreign states ¨to obtain and retain business¨, while German Siemens, and U.S. General Dynamics have better policies against active and passive corruption.

2. Magnus Berglund's MOT Program is populist propaganda to increase audience. No valuable truth content. In fact Slovenian police did not even open an investigation on the corruption charges against its Prime Minister and military. Wiitakorpi is a scapegoat, not very smart, but he is completely innocent. No bribes. A variation on this hypothesis is that Wiitakorpi and friends pocketed themselves the alleged bribe, and used the bribe allegation to enrich themselves. Another variation on this hypothesis of falsity of MOT allegations is the some journalists have been paid or tricked by some Patria competitors, in order to create a false report. In all these cases there is no bribe, Slovenian politicians and public officials are clean and innocent.

3. The third reasonable hypothesis is that corruption of state and military officials in arms trade is a European plague. It is not a question about business ethics of Finnish businessmen and political integrity of Slovenian politicians and military (that allegedly shared 21 million Eur, 7,5% of the contract price paid by Slovenian taxpayers). MOT program is a burst of sunlight, in spite of some small errors or minor slips into sensationalism. Actually, the program is sensational, and if it was not, why did Slovenian Embassy in Finland request to stop the broadcast?

=== Follow the money ===
The best angle may be seen by following the money involved in arms trade. Authorities have to complete investigations, but the free press of the Continent has the professional duty and the constitutional right to research on one of the less transparent and most protected items in national budgets. Lack of investigative reporting in the media is a dangerous democracy deficit. In democracy, security issues should not be used to conceal accountability. Defense procurement budgets are but taxpayers money. Corruption in security is one of the most corrosive forms of corrupt practices in democracies, since it is not only about money. It is about citizens trust in the lowest rank policeman up to a President of a country.

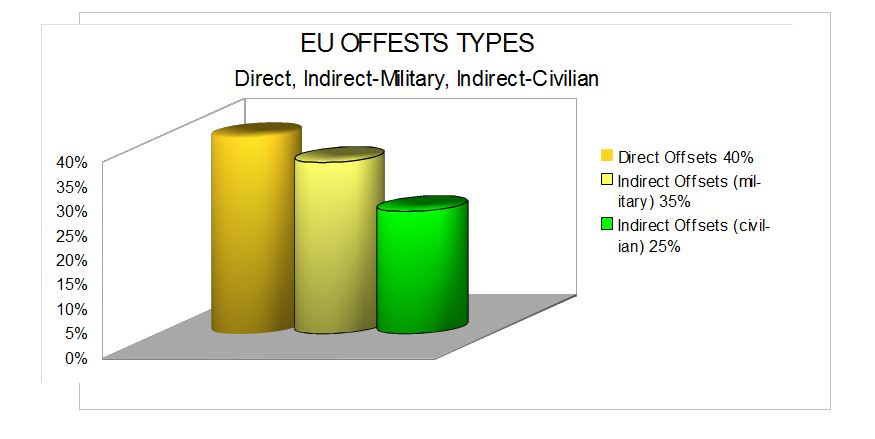
European Offset Distribution: Direct, Indirect military, Indirect civilian

The actual situation regarding offset agreements in EU is described in details in a study on defense offsets in the Union countries commissioned by the European Defense Agency and published in 2007. According to this study the volume of EU offset agreements in 2006 was above 4–5 billion euro. The distribution of these offsets is as shown in the diagram: Direct Offsets, Military Indirect Offsets, Civilian Indirect Offsets.

MOT opened up a valuable breach in an obscured area and, if it is right, it reveals a standard of requested bribe percentage to sell weapons in Europe.

== See also ==
- Patria (company)
- Patria AMV
- Portuguese Pandur
- General Dynamics
- MOWAG Piranha
- mechanized infantry
- Offset agreement
- Convention against Corruption (disambiguation)
- Foreign Corrupt Practices Act
- Politically exposed person
- Janez Janša
- Walter Wolf
- Lockheed bribery scandals
- Airbus affair
- Agusta scandal
- Cunningham scandal
- YLE
- Group of States Against Corruption
- Political corruption
- Transparency International
- OECD Anti-Bribery Convention
