= United Republic =

United Republic may refer to:

- République solidaire, a centre-right political party in France
- United Arab Republic, a former political union between Egypt and Syria, and the official name of Egypt until 1971
- United Republic of Tanzania, a country in central East Africa
  - United Republic of Tanganyika and Zanzibar, the old name for the United Republic of Tanzania
- United Republic of Cameroon, the old name for the Republic of Cameroon
- United Republics of China, a proposed name for a united China
- United Republic of Great Britain and Northern Ireland, a name proposed by some British republicans for the United Kingdom
- "United Republic", the national anthem of Yemen
- The United Republic of Nations, the main setting of The Legend of Korra
- United Republic, a 501c4 organization in the United States promoting "The American Anti-Corruption Act"

== See also ==
- United Federation (disambiguation)
- Political union
- Personal union
