= Josh Silver (disambiguation) =

Josh Silver or Joshua Silver may refer to:

- Josh Silver, American musician
- Joshua Silver, British physicist
- Josh Silver (nonprofit director), American nonprofit executive
- Josh Silver (author), British author
