= American Anti-Corruption Act =

American model legislation

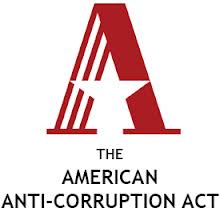

The American Anti-Corruption Act (AACA), sometimes shortened to Anti-Corruption Act, is a piece of model legislation designed to limit the influence of money in American politics by overhauling lobbying, transparency, and campaign finance laws. It was crafted in 2011 "by former Federal Election Commission chairman Trevor Potter in consultation with dozens of strategists, democracy reform leaders and constitutional attorneys from across the political spectrum, and is supported by reform organizations such as Represent.Us, which advocate for the passage of local, state, and federal laws modeled after the AACA. It is designed to limit or outlaw practices perceived to be major contributors to political corruption.

Its provisions cover three areas:

- Stop political bribery by overhauling lobbying and ethics laws
- End secret money by dramatically increasing transparency
- Fix our broken elections by ending gerrymandering and modernizing voting and election funding laws.

The AACA's authors state that its provisions are based on existing laws that have withstood court challenges, and are therefore constitutional.

== Authors ==
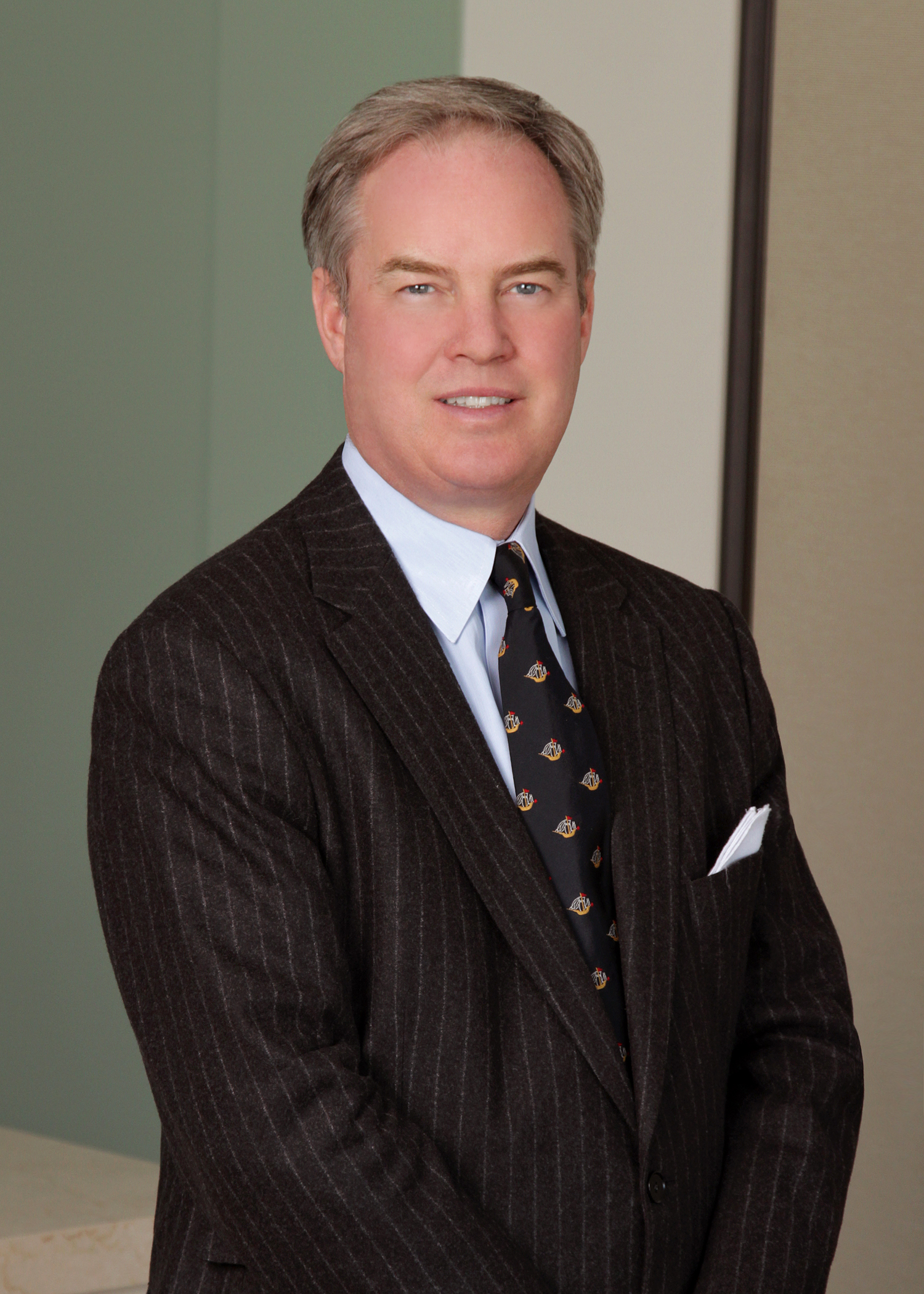
Former Republican Federal Election Commission Chairman Trevor Potter played a major role in shaping the AACA.

The American Anti-Corruption Act was written "in consultation with political strategists, democracy reform leaders, and constitutional attorneys from across the political spectrum." Co-authors include former Republican FEC commissioner Trevor Potter, Harvard professor and activist Lawrence Lessig, Theodore Roosevelt IV, and Represent.Us director Josh Silver. The Act was unveiled in 2012.

== Laws based on the AACA ==
The stated goal of the Anti-Corruption Act is to serve as "model legislation that sets a standard for city, state and federal laws," that prevent money from corrupting American government. Organizations such as Represent.Us advocate for state and local laws that reflect the provisions of the AACA, often using the ballot initiative process. Since the provisions of the AACA are likely to be found constitutional, this differs from the approach taken by other electoral reform groups such as Move to Amend, which advocate for a constitutional amendment to overturn Supreme Court decisions such as Citizens United v. FEC and Buckley v. Valeo.

=== Tallahassee Anti-Corruption Act ===
In 2014, voters in Tallahassee, Florida, approved a city charter amendment modeled after the AACA. The referendum, which passed with 67 percent of the vote, established a city ethics board, created public rebates for political donations up to $25, instructed the board to create an ethics code within six months of the referendum's passage, and lowered the acceptable value of political contributions to city candidates to $250 per donor.

The initiative passed with the support of a politically diverse coalition of local advocates, including the Chair of the Florida Tea Party Network, the former President of the Florida League of Women Voters, and the Chairman of Florida Common Cause.

=== Registration Fee and Monthly Reports for Expenditure Lobbyists, Proposition C: San Francisco ===
On November 3, 2015, voters in San Francisco passed Proposition C with 74.83% approval. The Proposition, put on the ballot by the San Francisco Ethics Commission, requires lobbyists to register with the city's Ethics Commission, pay a $500 registration fee, and file monthly disclosure reports of their lobbying activities. It also expands the definition of a lobbyist to include a new category—an "expenditure lobbyist"—that includes persons who spend more than $2,500 in a month to influence legislation or city administrative action. In addition, Proposition C prohibits expenditure lobbyists from making gifts worth more than $25 to city officers.

=== Honest Elections Seattle ===
In 2015, voters in Seattle, Washington, approved Initiative 122, the "Honest Elections Seattle" initiative, which made alterations and additions to Seattle's election code.

Amended sections include SMC 2.04.165 and SMC 2.04.370, which respectively cover the statement of personal financial affairs and contribution limits. New sections to the city's election code and their titles are as follows:

- SMC 2.04.601—Limits Contributions from City Contractors
- SMC 2.04.602—Limit Contributions from Persons Who Pay City Lobbyists
- SMC 2.04.606—Paid Signature Gatherers
- SMC 2.04.607—Former Elected Officials
- SMC 2.04.620-690—Democracy Voucher Program

I-122 established a voucher program that gave each Seattle voter four $25 "democracy vouchers" which they could donate to the candidates of their choice, as long as the candidate in question adheres to certain campaign contribution limits established by the law. The voucher system is funded by an increase in the city's property tax rate.

I-122 also created or strengthened several limits on campaign contributions. The maximum campaign contribution limit was lowered from $700 to $500. I-122 prohibits campaign contributions from any person or entity which currently has, or within the past two years has had, more than $250,000 in contracts with the city. Candidates are now additionally prohibited from accepting contributions from people who have spent $5,000 lobbying the city within the past 12 months.

Furthermore, various reporting and compliance standards were implemented by the law. Measure I-122 increased the brackets for candidate income disclosures, moving the top bracket from "above $25,000" to "above $5,000,000". I-122 also mandates that paid signature gatherers must display a sign or badge reading: "Paid Signature Gatherer". Finally, penalties for violating election laws were increased from $10 per day to $75 per day. Additional penalties ranging from $250 to $1,000 per day were created to punish infractions within 30 days of an election. Finally, I-122 prohibits elected officials and their staff from lobbying the city government within three years of their departure from office.

Initiative I-122 implemented several reforms, including new contribution limits on contractors that lobby the city, revolving door restrictions for city officials, and electronic disclosure requirements.[8] The initiative's backers cite the AACA as "the single most influential model [they] drew from" when crafting I-122.[9] I-122 passed with approval by 63.19% of voters.

=== Establishing Reporting Requirements for Political Consultants: Portland, Oregon ===
On April 20, 2016, voters in Portland Oregon voted to pass Ordinance 187680, thereby adding Chapter 2.14 to the city charter. According to the city's website, "The purpose of the program is to improve transparency by requiring Political Consultants advising City elected officials to meet certain registration and reporting requirements." The program is administered by the city auditor's office.

Ordinance 187680 mandated disclosures for political consultants:

- If providing Political Consultant services to a covered client, the Political Consultant must report the date services began, and related information. A covered client includes a City elected official, a successful candidate for City office, or either individual's principal campaign committee.
- If the Political Consultant also provides services for a City-referred ballot measure, the measure information and date services began must be reported.
- When no longer providing services to a covered client, the Political Consultant must provide a termination of services form within 15 days.

=== Miami-Dade County ===
On May 17, 2016, county commissioners passed a memorandum requiring that all candidates register when they raise money for PACs.

=== Proposition T Restricting Gifts and Campaign Contributions from Lobbyists ===
On November 8, 2016, voters in San Francisco passed Proposition T. The measure, which passed with 87.26% of voter support, requires lobbyists to identify which agencies and officials they intend to target during the city's registration process, prohibits them from making campaign contributions to officials they are registered to lobby and making gifts to any city elected official, and prohibits the facilitation of third-party donations by lobbyists, a process known as "bundling".

=== Revision of South Dakota State Campaign Finance and Lobbying Laws ===
In November 2016, voters in South Dakota approved Initiated Measure 22, also known as the Revision of State Campaign Finance and Lobbying Laws, and referred to by supporters as the South Dakota Anti-Corruption Act. IM-22 passed with 51.83% voter support.

The major features of IM-22 were campaign finance reform, including lowering contribution limits and requiring additional disclosures; the creation of a public financing program for state and legislative candidates; the creation of an ethics commission; and the implementation of "cooling off" periods that establish a duration former legislators must wait before taking work as a lobbyist.

The measure made significant alterations to existing campaign finance laws in the state. Per the State Attorney General explanation:

This measure extensively revises State campaign finance laws. It requires additional disclosures and increased reporting. It lowers contribution amounts to political action committees; political parties; and candidates for statewide, legislative, or county office. It also imposes limits on contributions from candidate campaign committees, political action committees, and political parties.

The measure creates a publicly funded campaign finance program for statewide and legislative candidates who choose to participate and agree to limits on campaign contributions and expenditures. Under the program, two $50 "credits" are issued to each registered voter, who assigns them to participating candidates. The credits are redeemed from the program, which is funded by an annual State general-fund appropriation of $9 per registered voter. The program fund may not exceed $12 million at any time.

The measure creates an appointed ethics commission to administer the credit program and to enforce campaign finance and lobbying laws.

The measure prohibits certain State officials and high-level employees from lobbying until two years after leaving State government. It also places limitations on lobbyists' gifts to certain state officials and staff members.

==== Repeal ====
On December 8, 2016, Judge Mark Barnett of South Dakota's Sixth Circuit enjoined IM-22 on the grounds that it was unconstitutional and violated single-subject law.

On February 2, 2017, South Dakota Governor Dennis Daugaard signed House Bill 1069, effectively repealing IM-22. Because HB 1069 was signed with an emergency clause, it prevented IM-22 from returning to the ballot.

On March 10, 2017, Governor Daugaard signed into effect five bills he claimed were meant to replace concepts from IM-22: HB 1073, which restricts lobbyist gifts to legislators; HB 1076, which establishes a government accountability board; HB 1052, an act to provide certain protections for public employees; HB 1165, an act to provide for annually updated financial interest statements for any person elected to statewide or local office; and SB 131, an act revising certain provisions concerning the period of time certain persons are prohibited from lobbying after leaving office.

=== Measure 26-184: Multnomah County, Oregon ===
On November 8, 2016, voters in Multnomah County, Oregon, passed Measure 26-184, which "limits contributions, expenditures, (and) requires disclosure in Multnomah County candidate elections. The measure created a charter provision, implemented by county ordinance, and went into effect September 2017.

The ballot measure, which passed with 89% of voter support, makes significant alterations to campaign finance law at the county level. Prior to Measure 26-184, there had been no limits to county officials' ability to accept donations. Measure 26-184 established a $500 limit for individuals and political committees. It also allowed for the creation of "small donor committees", which can accept no more than $100 from an individual within a year and can contribute unlimited amounts to candidates or independent expenditures. The measure further limits independent expenditures in county races to $5,000 per individual and $10,000 per political committee.

The measure additionally increases reporting standards. It requires entities that spend "more than $750 per election cycle on independent expenditures" to register as political committees and report the sources of their funding. Communications to voters that are related to county elections must disclose their "five largest true original sources of funding (in excess of $500) for the communication."

=== Open and Accountable Elections: Portland, Oregon ===
On December 14, 2016, the City Council of Portland, Oregon, approved a small-donor matching program, dubbed Open and Accountable Elections. The program allows city candidates who qualify to have their donations matched by public funds. The first $50 will be matched 6:1 by the city, meaning that a donation of $50 would be worth $350 to a candidate and a $100 donation would be worth $400 to a candidate.

In order to qualify, candidates must meet several conditions:

- They must not accept donations from anyone living outside of Portland, Oregon
- They must not accept donations exceeding $250
- Commission candidates would first need to raise $2,500 from 250 individuals
- Mayoral candidates would first need to raise $5,000 from 500 individuals

Participating candidates are required to cap overall spending at $550,000 for a commission race, allocating up to $250,000 for the primary and up to $300,000 for the general election. Participating mayoral candidates' spending is capped at $950,000; they can spend up to $380,000 in the primary and up to $570,000 in the general election.

=== Anti-Corruption Resolutions ===
Anti-Corruption Resolutions are public mandates calling for Anti-Corruption legislation at the state and federal level. On July 14, 2014, Princeton, New Jersey, "became the first municipality in the country to adopt an Anti-Corruption Resolution sponsored by Represent.Us". The Princeton resolution mentions six of the eleven provisions in the original AACA draft

Anti-Corruption Resolutions have been passed in the following locales:

- Princeton, New Jersey
- Genoa, Illinois
- Massachusetts State House District 2
- Massachusetts State Senate District 19
- Ewing Township, New Jersey
- DeKalb County, Illinois
- Winnebago County, Illinois
- Roanoke, Virginia
- South Brunswick, New Jersey
- Leverett, Massachusetts
- Lawrence Township, New Jersey
- Cocoa, Florida
- Southfield, Michigan
- Boone County, Illinois
- McHenry County, Illinois
- Wilkes-Barre, Pennsylvania
- Luzerne County, Pennsylvania
- Pittston, Pennsylvania
- Lexington, Massachusetts
- Rockport, Massachusetts
- Stephenson County, Illinois
- Acton, Massachusetts
- South Hadley, Massachusetts
- Carrboro, North Carolina
- Concord, Massachusetts
- Whately, Massachusetts
- Nahant, Massachusetts
- Marblehead, Massachusetts
- Stoneham, Massachusetts
- Colrain, Massachusetts
- Hadley, Massachusetts
- Cummington, Massachusetts
- Montague, Massachusetts
- Plainfield, Massachusetts
- Shutesbury, Massachusetts
- Conway, Massachusetts
- Andover, Massachusetts
- Hatfield, Massachusetts
- Longmeadow, Massachusetts
- Amherst, Massachusetts
- Swampscott, Massachusetts
- Southampton, Massachusetts
- North Andover, Massachusetts
- Williamsburg, Massachusetts
- Pleasant Ridge, Michigan
- Burnsville, North Carolina
- West Windsor, New Jersey
- South Abington, Pennsylvania
- Ferndale, Michigan
- Yancey County, North Carolina
- Cranbury Township, New Jersey
- Cook County, Illinois
- Erie City, Pennsylvania
- Kingston Township, Pennsylvania
- Foster Township, Pennsylvania
- Tempe, Arizona
- Northumberland County, Pennsylvania
- Nescopeck Township, Pennsylvania
- Sunderland, Massachusetts
- Ohio
- Sudbury, Massachusetts
- Pelham, Massachusetts
- DuPage County, Illinois
- Bridgeport, Connecticut
- Vinton, Virginia
- Hopewell, New Jersey

== Survey results ==
An opinion poll commissioned by Represent.Us found that 90 percent of respondents support tighter limits on campaign finance, and 97 percent would support stronger anti-corruption measures. "The poll also tested the popularity of some potential reforms, giving respondents a menu of 11 options and asking them to pick three. Forty-seven percent picked barring politicians from taking money from industries they regulate ... . Thirty-seven percent picked dramatically reducing the amount of money lobbyists can give to candidates and parties, while 31% picked putting tough limits on super PACs", according to the MSNBC summary of the survey.

== See also ==
- National Popular Vote Interstate Compact. If passed by enough states, this would require all participating states to give all their electoral college votes to the popular vote winner.
