= RepresentUs =

American not-for-profit organization

- Formation: 2012; 14 years ago
- Founders: Josh Silver; Joshua Graham Lynn
- Type: Advocacy
- Legal status: 501(c)(3) charity: RepresentUs Education Fund; 501(c)(4) social welfare organization: RepresentUs
- Location: Florence, Massachusetts
- Chief Executive Officer: Joshua Graham Lynn
- Parent organization: United Republic
- Affiliations: Princeton Gerrymandering Process; VoteSafe; County Every Hero; Princeton Innovation Lab
- Website: represent.us

RepresentUs is a non-partisan not-for-profit organization focused on ending political corruption in the United States. Funded by donations and grants, it is run mostly by volunteers aligned in a grassroots organizing network, and it has brought in high-profile celebrities to advance its message. It advertises, produces videos, and generates publicity with speeches and demonstrations and protests.

== Mission and objectives ==
The chief focus of the organization is to end political corruption. For that end, it pushes for reforms to protect voting rights, eliminate gerrymandering, overhaul lobbying, promote financial transparency particularly regarding political donations, promote ranked choice voting and open primaries and campaign finance reform. It favors independent and bipartisan redistricting commissions for drawing congressional maps. It advocates passage of the Freedom to Vote Act. Its aim is to pass "powerful state and local laws that fix our broken elections and stop political bribery," according to an account in The Verge. It supports the John Lewis Voting Rights Advancement Act and the For the People Act. It tries to put "power back in the hands of the voters." Along these lines, spokespersons including Jennifer Lawrence and Khloé Kardashian have called for greater access for at-home voting in presidential primaries.

An initial stated goal was to pass the American Anti-Corruption Act. It was written with the insights of political strategists, democratic reformers, and constitutional attorneys from various parts of the political spectrum; one of the authors was RepresentUs's co-founder, Josh Silver (nonprofit director). It was unveiled in 2012. It is an example of model legislation in that it was drafted in such a way that it could be used by various jurisdictions with a minimal need for editing, while continuing to be consistent with the current constitutional structure. The act overhauls lobbying, encourages greater political transparency, and reforms campaign finance laws.

RepresentUs generally focuses not on the federal government but instead on local and state governments, since it figures it has the most leverage there; accordingly, it ignores United States territories such as Guam. It chose not to go to Congress directly because, in its view, congresspersons have already been corrupted by special interests and are unlikely to support substantive reform. It calls for a national voting standard by enacting laws at the local level. It has achieved results in progressive states, conservative states, and so-called "toss-up" states, and it tailors its efforts according to the particulars of each locality. It promotes ballot initiatives which allow citizens to vote on reform measures directly, and it ignores in-office politicians hobbled by political gridlock at the federal level. The idea is to build momentum for national reform by starting at the local level with a grassroots approach.

RepresentUs figures that if it can enlist the engagement of eleven million Americans, or about 3.5 percent of the population, it can effect substantive change to protect democracy, citing studies that show that that percentage is needed to effect change.

RepresentUs received the Candid Platinum Seal of Transparency (formerly Guidestar) in 2021.

== Leadership and organization ==
Josh Silver and Joshua Graham Lynn co-founded the group in 2012. In January 2022, Lynn became the chief executive officer and Silver became the Executive Chairman. Lynn's professional background is in marketing and creative services. The organization that they founded is a project of the 501(c)4 organization United Republic which is a principal sponsor of the American Anti-Corruption Act. RepresentUs is headquartered in Florence, Massachusetts.

The management of RepresentUs is divided into several branches: a board of directors, an advisory council, a cultural council, and a full-time staff. They include numerous high-profile leaders, including former FEC commissioner Trevor Potter, Harvard law professor Lawrence Lessig, disgraced lobbyist-turned-reformer Jack Abramoff, representatives from Occupy Wall Street and the DC Tea Party Patriots, and the great-grandson of the former president, Theodore Roosevelt IV. Actor Jennifer Lawrence is on the board of directors.

Numerous chapters nationwide are led by volunteers. They organize public education and activities to support local anti-corruption initiatives. There are more than forty local chapters including ones in Tallahassee, Illinois, the Roanoke Valley of Virginia, and New Orleans. Volunteer Mary Richards of Clarksville, Tennessee explained why she is leading a local chapter; as a nurse, she realized that the problems with the healthcare system were a "direct result of a broken political system" and she became frustrated with a system that is "rigged against us." Volunteer John House, president of the New Mexico branch, feels that "our democracy is under siege", so he organized a demonstration in Santa Fe to call for filibuster reform and for approval of the John Lewis Voting Rights Act. Volunteer Renaldo Pearson walked six hundred miles from Atlanta to Washington, D.C. as a media stunt to show his support for voter protections, safer elections and an end to political corruption. During his journey, he received a positive tweet of support from actor Kerry Washington. Volunteer Ash Orr of the West Virginia chapter organized small business owners into a coalition to support the For the People Act.

RepresentUs is organized into two affiliated nonprofit entities for tax purposes. Its 501(c)(3) education fund engages in public education, movement building and advocacy; for example, it publishes an online blog which chronicles campaign finance news, called The Bulletin. Its 501(c)(4) fund engages in legislative lobbying at the municipal and state levels. It is funded by individual donations as well as grants from philanthropic foundations. Donors are listed on its website. It does not accept money from governments, intergovernmental organizations, political parties, or corporations to avoid their influence. In one virtual gala event entitled United To Save The Vote, RepresentUs raised $2.1 million to help promote secure absentee ballots and safe in-person voting locations.

RepresentUs has been working with the organization Princeton Gerrymandering Process to identify and rate each state's congressional redistricting plans. It has worked with organizations such as VoteSafe and the County Every Hero coalitions, to counter misinformation about alleged voter fraud and to educate the public about the need for safe and secure elections. They've reached out to other groups of voters, such as military people; their "Count Every Hero" effort is an effort to make sure that service members' votes are counted appropriately.

== Communications ==
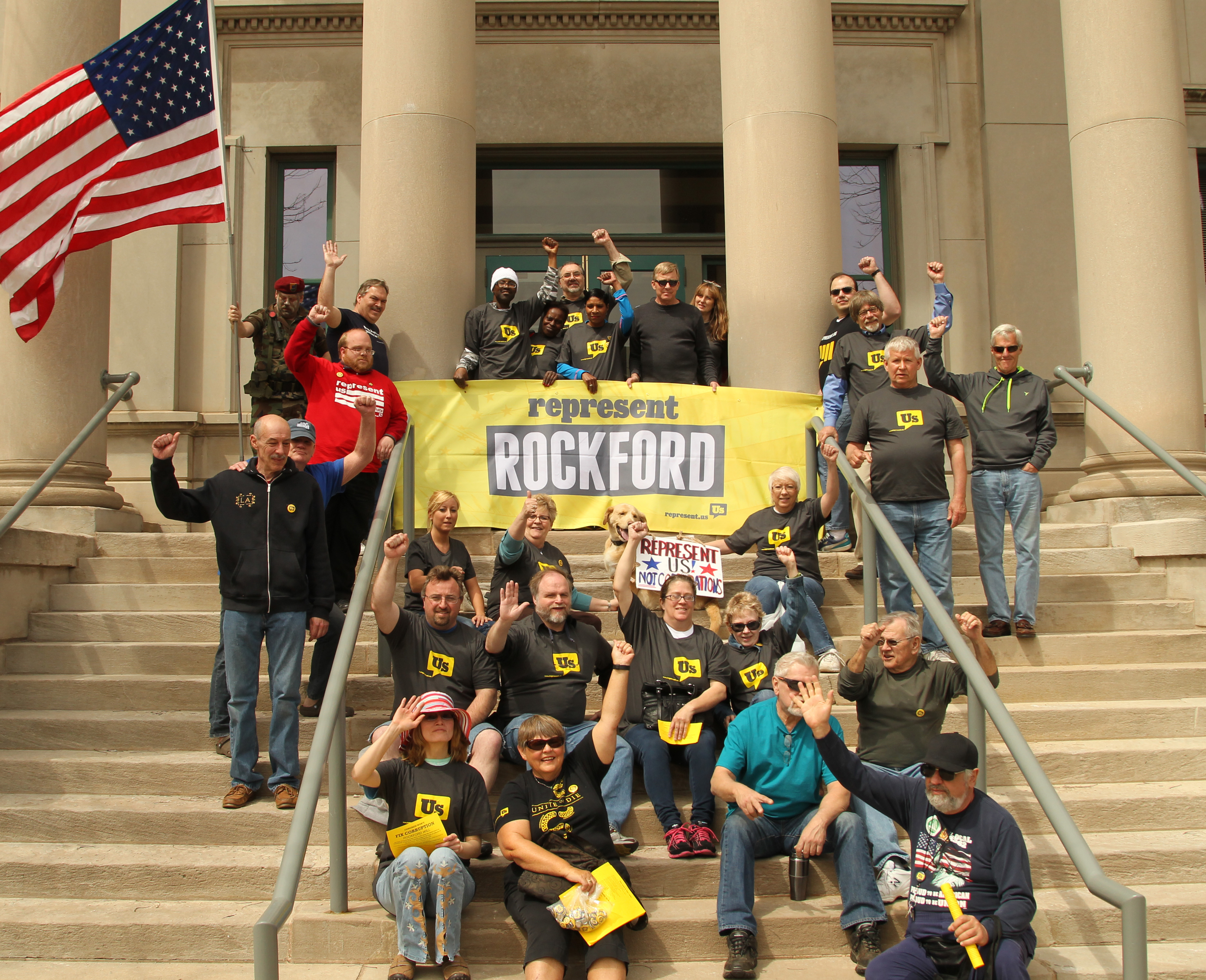
Represent Rockford, a volunteer-led RepresentUs chapter based in Rockford, Illinois

RepresentUs engages in a variety of communications strategies to try to reach and persuade people. They partner with advertising agencies and public relations firms and marketing professionals to create innovative advertisements and promotions as well as manage creative media stunts. They are active on social media. Their leaders write op-ed opinion pieces in major media and make speeches in public venues; for example, actor Jennifer Lawrence and co-founder Lynn appeared together at a high school in Cleveland to speak with students about the pressing need to fight political corruption. The group criticized a redistricting proposal by Florida governor Ron DeSantis in early 2022 to further gerrymander Florida's congressional districts.

=== Advertising and media campaigns ===
RepresentUs created a fictional presidential candidate played by actor Frank Ridley to be the character 'Gil Fulbright'. The intent was to focus public attention on corruption. They ran a fake senate campaign in 2014, and in 2016, the Fulbright character "ran" for president. The presidential launch video garnered over one million views in less than 24 hours. The fictional Fulbright character went on to beat several real candidates in a 2016 presidential straw poll, and out-fundraised legitimate Democratic presidential candidate Lincoln Chafee.

RepresentUs launched a campaign entitled Justice for Sale in 2020 that focused on highlighting problems with America's criminal justice system. Actor Omar Epps and voting rights activist Desmond Meade narrated the video.

The organization hired the advertising firm named Mischief @ No Fixed Address to cause a pizza parlor to restrict its deliveries to within gerrymandered delivery zones, so that persons who lived outside the zone were excluded from getting pizza. The purpose of the stunt was to illustrate the absurdity of gerrymandering with a consumer delivery issue, and it garnered national media attention.

Working with the Leo Burnett advertising agency, RepresentUs had them create a font based on the shapes of gerrymandered congressional districts, called Ugly Gerry; it features gerrymandered characters for the letters A through Z, no numbers, and below each character it says "No rights reserved".

Board member and actor Jennifer Lawrence starred in a short film produced by RepresentUs entitled Unbreaking America: Solving the Corruption Crisis which described how the United States is a "broken democracy" and what actions people can take to remedy the situation. In the Lawrence-narrated plan which proceeded for twelve minutes, she outlined a solution as adopting the American Anti-Corruption Act. She warned, "If you do nothing, nothing changes."

A video starring the comedian Amy Schumer urged support for the For The People Act so that "politicians can't steal our goddamn elections."

The group enlisted the support of various podcasters to promote pro-democracy issues on their podcasts; the podcasters included the publisher Pushkin Industries, Radiotopia, The Sporkful, Avery Trufelman, and Dan Le Batard.

RepresentUs produced an advertisement entitled Transmissions from the Future featuring pop singer Katy Perry and actor Orlando Bloom which issued a dire warning to Americans about the possible upcoming death of democracy. The Perry-Bloom spot was displayed prominently in New York City, on the NASDAQ, at Reuters and at One Times Square.

In another advertisement in 2021, RepresentUs spoofed erectile dysfunction ads with one about electile dysfunction; in it, Mark Ruffalo appeared with comedian and actor Jake Johnson and actor Jonathan Scott to use humor to urge passage of the Freedom to Vote Act. The ad debuted on The Rachel Maddow Show and garnered 300,000 views on social media.

The actor Ed Helms urged action in another video on the student loan debt crisis.

In 2020 the group made a video using deepfake technology which showed current dictators warning about the death of democracy. The intent was to try to show Americans how serious the current issues are.

Often advertisements are bolstered with simultaneous social media campaigns. For example, when they released their deepfake advertisement, they supplemented the advertisements with tandem social media posts by Katy Perry, Orlando Bloom, Lawrence, Ed Helms, Alyssa Milano, and Kathy Griffin.

In another advertisement, they enlisted prominent celebrities to appear "naked" to illustrate how a ballot is considered unusable, or "naked", if it is not filled out properly before being mailed. The spot included Tiffany Haddish, Chris Rock, Amy Schumer, Chelsea Handler, Naomi Campbell, Mark Ruffalo, Sarah Silverman and her father Donald, Josh Gad, Ryan Michelle Bathe, and a fully dressed Sacha Baron Cohen. RepresentUs gave it out unbranded to allow various media platforms to copy it without charge, to enable further dissemination of its message.

=== Protests and demonstrations ===
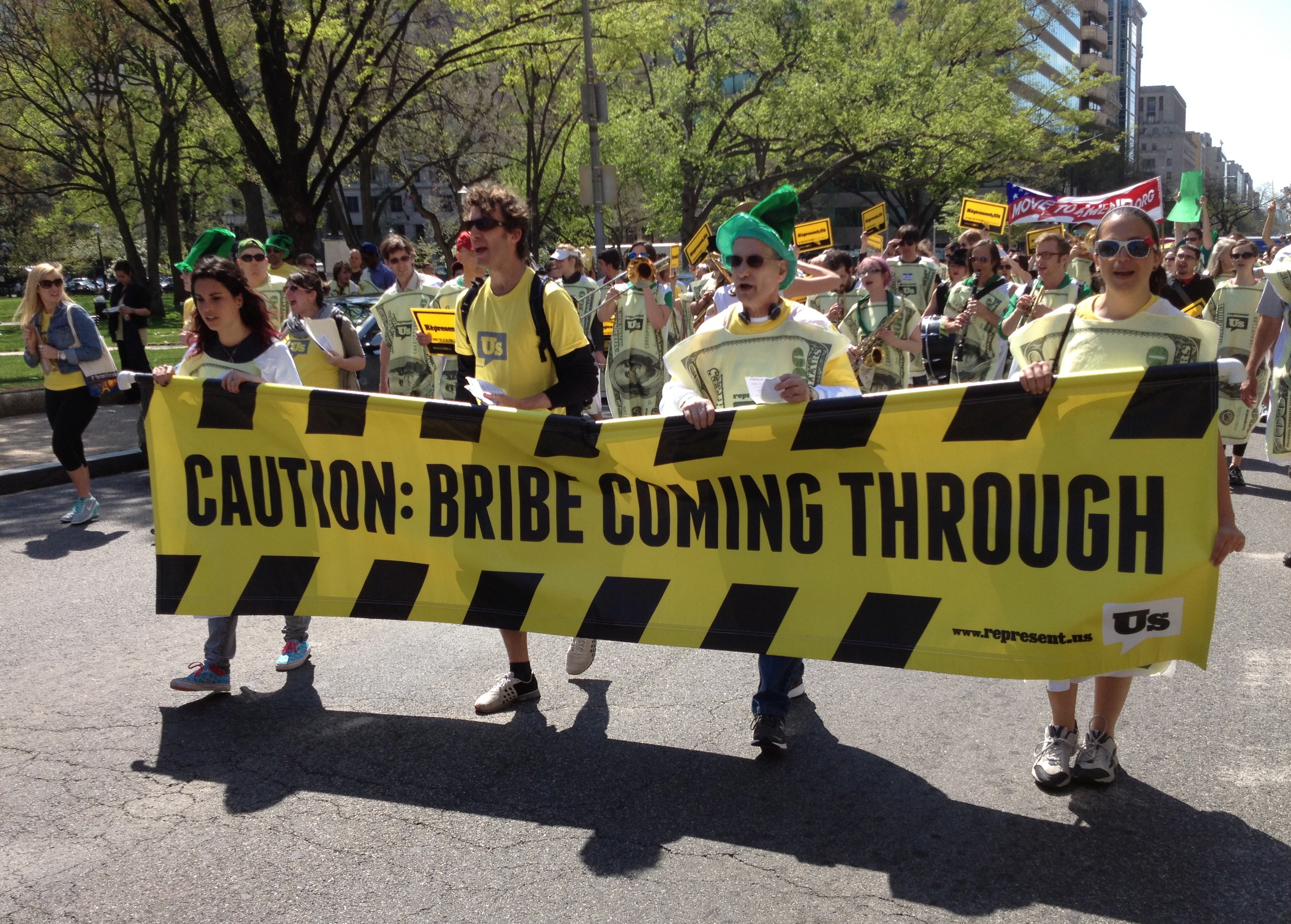
RepresentUs volunteers in Washington, D.C.

RepresentUs has sponsored and promoted demonstrations to win media attention to their cause. A chapter instigated rallies to protest gerrymandered congressional districts in La Crosse, Wisconsin. Another one participated in a candlelight vigil in Princeton, New Jersey in January 2022, to remember the one year anniversary following the 2021 United States Capitol attack.

Silver explained the logic of an unusual protest in Washington D.C. Approximately 700 people dressed up as $100 bills ran down K Street toward the Capitol, knowing that they would be blocked from entry by the Capitol police; at that point, the demonstrators would honor the police with a golden plaque for doing what Congress has been afraid of doing, namely, keeping money out of Congress. In its hundred dollar bills demonstration, leaders from the Tea Party as well as from the Bold Progressives participated by giving speeches, a further sign according to Silver that RepresentUs includes persons from across the ideological divide.

=== Celebrity involvement ===
The organization has attracted the volunteer help of celebrities from the entertainment and sporting world. The list of participants includes actors for example: Jennifer Lawrence, singer Katy Perry and comedian Kathy Griffin. It also includes basketball star Stephen Curry, actor Michael Douglas and voting rights activist Desmond Meade What inspired Lawrence to become more active in politics was the election of Donald Trump in 2016, prompting her to no longer be a "little Republican", as she described herself, and she joined RepresentUs soon thereafter. Lawrence and Kardashian called for greater access for at-home voting in presidential primaries in one video.

== Research ==
RepresentUs has a research department that studies corruption-related issues. One such issue is gerrymandering which was particularly important in 2020 and 2021 when congressional district maps were being redrawn based on the 2020 census. RepresentUs monitored redistricting efforts to assess fairness. It publishes a Gerrymandering Threat Index, and in conjunction with the Princeton Innovation Lab, it issues a Redistricting Report Card. It reported that Michigan did a better job of redistricting than Virginia. Texas and Ohio have extremely gerrymandered congressional districts. On its extreme threat list were the states of Nevada, Utah and Wyoming since politicians are heavily involved in the congressional cartography. It graded the state of Texas with an 'F' for having a "significant Republican advantage," and described it as dangerous since it "gives politicians complete control over an often-secretive, poorly-protected redistricting process". Both parties engage in gerrymandering; if Texas is heavily gerrymandered toward Republicans, Illinois is heavily gerrymandered toward Democrats. According to Silver, gerrymandering can tilt the balance of power in the House of Representatives; he faults gerrymandering for leading to extremism and partisan gridlock.

In addition, RepresentUs conducts public opinion polls on selected issues. It sponsored a poll in North Carolina which found that 90% of voters oppose drawing voting districts to favor one party or candidate. Its research suggests that wide swaths of the public "across partisan lines" are dissatisfied with the current system of American governance and are ready for reform measures.

Further, it shares its findings with other organizations; for example, Axios used research from RepresentUs to help build an interactive information resource for voters.

== Annual conferences ==
RepresentUs holds an annual conference called Unrig Summit in a different city each year. Its first conference was held in February 2018 in New Orleans. In March 2019, 2,000 persons attended the conference in Nashville including United Nations official Kate Gilmore, gun control advocate X González, voting rights activist Desmond Meade, and actress and comedian Sasheer Zamata. Actress and RepresentUs board member Lawrence released a short film detailing the organization's political aims to a general audience. According to RepresentUs, the summit is the largest national event that attempts to address underlining causes of dysfunction in the United States government. In 2020 and 2021, no in-person conferences were held because of the COVID-19 pandemic.

== History ==
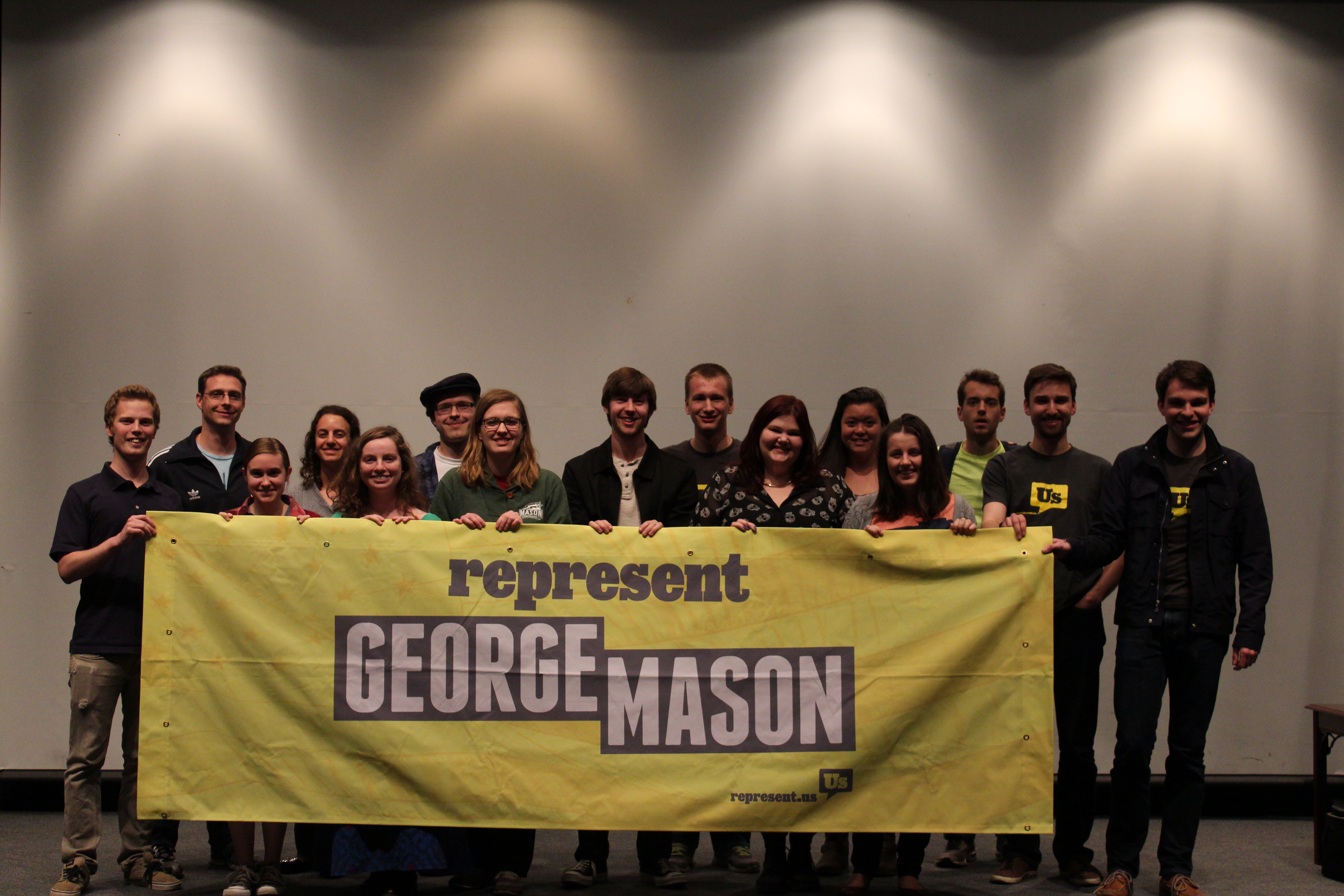
Represent George Mason, a volunteer-led RepresentUs chapter at George Mason University

=== Beginnings ===
The organization was co-founded by Josh Silver and Joshua Graham Lynn in 2012. What partially spurred them to act was the 2010 Supreme Court decision on Citizens United. The pair studied statistics and research which led them to believe that a root cause of American political dysfunction was failed elections. They wanted to focus on "bridging the ideological divide". They learned that the preferences of average Americans were having zero impact on public policy.

We basically need to build a nonpartisan countervailing force to those who are countermanding democracy, the followers of the Big Lie.

— Lynn in 2022.

Silver saw a steady erosion of ethical standards in Congress during the past fifty years, with money flowing into and out of the US Capitol in the form of campaign contributions to elected officials or going to lawmakers who oversee regulated industries.

You’ve got a political system that has become basically coin operated — where those with the money set the parameters of the debate in Washington; they are the most influential in who gets elected and who doesn’t and they are ensuring that the public interest is marginalized so that they can increase their profits, increase their own interests. And that’s happening on every issue virtually, from environment to healthcare to poverty, you name it.

— Silver in 2013

One of the first acts of RepresentUs was to support the 2011 American Anti-Corruption Act. It had been written by former FEC Commissioner Trevor Potter in consultation with Lawrence Lessig and other constitutional lawyers and scholars. As an example of model legislation, it was designed to be fully compatible with previous decisions by the Supreme Court such as its Citizens United v. FEC 2010 decision as well as subsequent rulings, so that local governments could use it as a model and adapt it to write their own anti-corruption legislation. The purposes of the act were to stop political bribery by making it illegal for politicians to accept money from the special interests that they regulate, as well as ending secret money, so people could identify the sources of all political contributions and move elections toward small-dollar, voter-funded campaigns. In 2014 in Tallahassee, Florida, voters approved a city charter amendment modeled after the act that established a city ethics commission, imposed stricter contribution limits on candidates for city office, and created a public financing system. What was instructive to the co-founders was that the initiative succeeded with support from a politically diverse coalition which included the Chair of the Florida Tea Party Network, the former President of the Florida League of Women Voters, the Chairman of Florida Common Cause, and a former Democratic County Commissioner.

=== 2016 election year ===
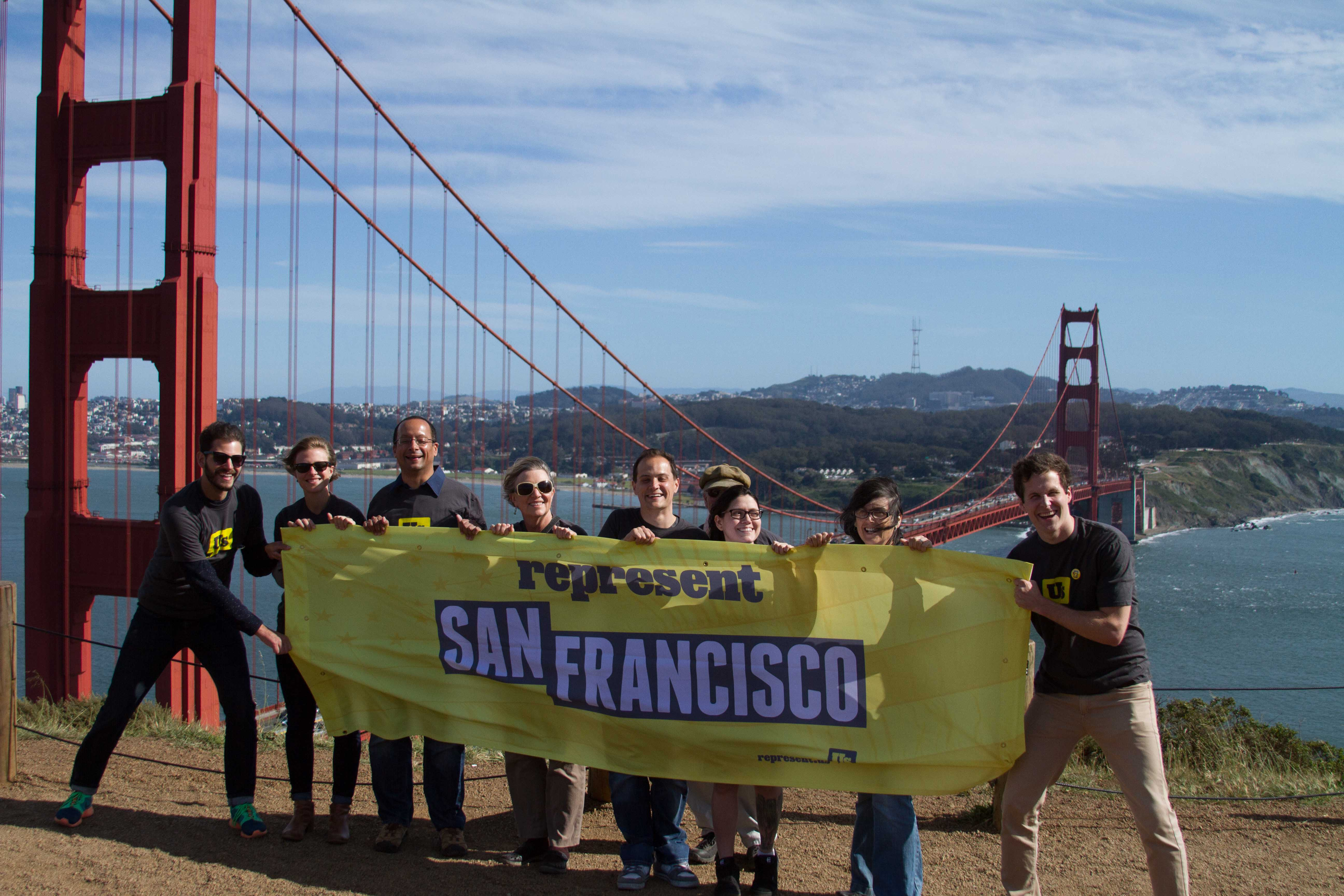
Represent San Francisco, a volunteer-led RepresentUs chapter based in San Francisco, California

In 2016 the organization succeeded in bringing about thirteen successful state and local anti-corruption acts and resolutions. In South Dakota, it brought about the sweeping political reform package known as IM-22 which overhauled campaign finance rules and banned secret and unlimited gifts from lobbyists to politicians, as well as required greater transparency for campaign contributions and toughened the enforcement of state ethics laws. In Maine, it established ranked choice voting with its 2016 Maine Question 5 for all statewide elections. In Missouri, with its Amendment 2, it limited individual contributions to candidates running for state or judicial office to the amount of $2,600 per election, and to $25,000 to political parties per election; before that, there had been no limits on such contributions. In Rhode Island with its Question 2, it restored the constitutional authority of the state's ethics commission, giving it the power to police ethics violations by members of the General Assembly. In Washington, it passed a state call to overturn the Citizens United v. FEC|Citizens United decision with its Washington Initiative 735. It promoted a similar effort in California with a statewide call to overturn Citizens United with California Proposition 59.

In 2016 the organization achieved similar results at the municipal level. Resolutions are often initiated by members of the local chapters, which get technical assistance and organizational support from RepresentUs's national staff. Anti-Corruption resolutions are mandates demonstrating public support for such measures. In San Francisco, the city banned gifts from lobbyists to elected officials and from hiding contributions by bundling them together with its Proposition T. In the neighboring city of Berkeley, Measure X1 encouraged candidates to accept only donations from Berkeley residents, and to impose a maximum donation per person of only $50; candidates who agree to such terms are then rewarded with six dollars of public financing for every one dollar donation from residents. In Howard County, Maryland, an amendment to the county charter, dubbed 'Question A', established the Citizens Election Fund for races for the county's council and executive positions. In Benton County, Oregon, Measure 2-100 established ranked choice voting for local elections. In Multnomah County, Oregon, Measure 26-184 limited contributions from individuals and PACs to $500, limited independent spending, and requires donors to disclose the original sources of monies for campaign advertising. In Boone County, Illinois and in McHenry County, Illinois, ballot questions were added calling on local and federal officials to pass legislation based on the American Anti-Corruption Act. Anti-corruption legislation and resolutions have been passed in Tallahassee, Florida, Seattle, Washington, Princeton, New Jersey, Genoa, Illinois, Massachusetts State House Districts 2 and 19, Ewing Township, New Jersey, DeKalb County, Illinois, Winnebago County, Illinois, and Roanoke, Virginia.

=== 2018 election year ===
RepresentUs expanded their activity in the succeeding years and led a number of successful efforts in the 2018 election year. In Colorado, they helped thwart gerrymandering by creating a twelve-member independent commission to draw fair congressional districts as well as state legislative districts, by passing Amendments Y&Z. In Michigan, activist Katie Fahey spearheaded an effort to reduce gerrymandering by creating an impartial citizen commission to draw up congressional and state districts, with its Proposal 2. In Missouri, it pushed for the Clean Missouri Amendment 1 to work against gerrymandering by creating a nonpartisan office called "The State Demographer" to draw impartial district lines. In Ohio, it promoted Issue 1, an anti-gerrymandering initiative that forces bipartisan agreement on the drawing of congressional district lines. In Utah, the ballot measure Proposition 4 created a seven-member redistricting commission which required, among other things, that they release draft plans to the public before finalizing any maps. In Massachusetts, statewide Question 2 created a commission to study the effects of Citizens United. In Maine, a people's veto referendum entitled Question 1 protected ranked choice voting.

=== 2019–present ===
Lynn sees serious threats to American democracy; if threats were assigned color codes, he would not use a yellow or orange but a red code to warn of imminent danger. While he describes himself as "fiercely nonpartisan", he claimed that Donald Trump pursued an "electoral coup" in early 2021.

As of January 2022, RepresentUs has helped to pass about 130 anti-corruption and pro-democracy laws, according to an internal assessment made by Ross Sherman, a strategist working for RepresentUs.

Silver unsuccessfully lobbied Democratic senators Joe Manchin and Kyrsten Sinema to "protect voting rights" and to end the filibuster. While the efforts of RepresentUs have borne fruit in many states during the past ten years, with resolutions and laws passed, Silver claimed there would be "a decline into authoritarianism" if the reforms pursued by his organization are not passed. Silver would like all elected officials to state a formal pledge, on the record, that they support anti-corruption measures to earn them a "seal of approval" devised by his organization.
