= Ugly Gerry =

Font using shapes of US Congress districts

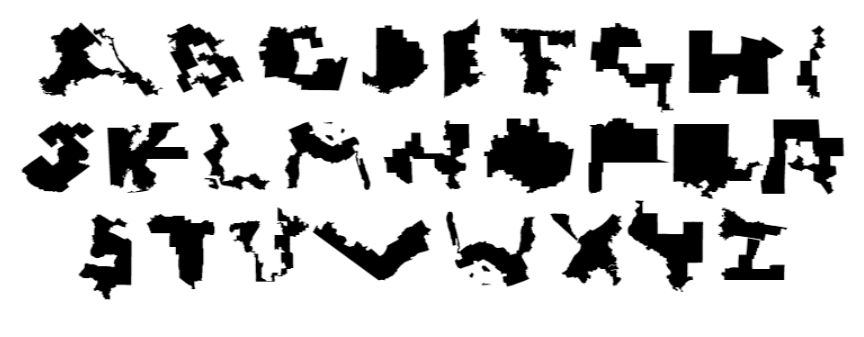
- Category: Script (typefaces)
- Designers: Ben Doessel and James Lee
- Date released: September 2019; 7 years ago

Ugly Gerry is a font that uses the shapes of United States congressional districts for each of its characters, created in 2019 as a protest against gerrymandering. It was designed by Ben Doessel and James Lee of the Leo Burnett Agency in a project for RepresentUs.

== Design ==
The designers' intention was to draw attention to gerrymandering:

The team is from Chicago, and after seeing how janky our Illinois 4th district had become, we became interested in this issue. ... Its notorious earmuff shape looked like a U, then after seeing other letters on the map, the idea hit us, let's create a typeface so our districts can become digital graffiti that voters and politicians can't ignore.

Shapes that loosely resemble the letters 'A' through 'Z' were used to create the (uppercase) font. Some of these shapes are not of single districts but instead combine pairs.

Ugly Gerry has been called "the world's most revolting font".

Letter	District(s)
A	California's 3rd and Texas's 35th
B	Ohio's 12th and 7th
C	Connecticut's 1st
D	Missouri's 8th
E	Missouri's 6th
F	Oregon's 5th
G	Ohio's 4th
H	North Carolina's 6th
I	Texas's 15th
J	Illinois's 18th
K	Alabama's 1st
L	New York's 7th
M	New York's 8th
N	Illinois's 11th
O	Arizona's 6th
P	Florida's 25th
Q	Texas's 12th
R	Ohio's 10th and Michigan's 13th
S	Tennessee's 4th
T	California's 43rd
U	Illinois's 4th
V	New Jersey's 5th
W	New York's 8th
X	California's 8th and 14th
Y	Illinois's 12th
Z	Indiana's 8th and Ohio's 8th

== Usability ==
The Ugly Gerry font has no numerals or special characters. It provides only the capital letters 'A' to 'Z' (no lowercase) and some punctuation. At the foot of each page of its website is "No rights reserved".

== Recognition ==
Ugly Gerry won the 2020 ADC Award for typography.

== See also ==
- List of typefaces
- Protest art
