= Democracy voucher =

Political campaign public financing method

A democracy voucher is a method of public financing of campaigns used in municipal elections in Seattle, Washington, United States. It was approved in 2015 and debuted during the 2017 election cycle. The program provides city residents with four vouchers, each worth $25, that can be pledged to eligible candidates running for municipal offices. It is funded by a property tax and is applied on a first-come, first-served basis.

The repealed Revision of South Dakota State Campaign Finance and Lobbying Laws included provisions for democracy vouchers. The Andrew Yang 2020 presidential campaign proposed a similar "Democracy Dollars" plan, and a "Democracy Dollars" program, modeled after Seattle, was approved in Oakland, California in 2022. As of 2026, it has yet to be rolled out.

== Implementation in Seattle ==
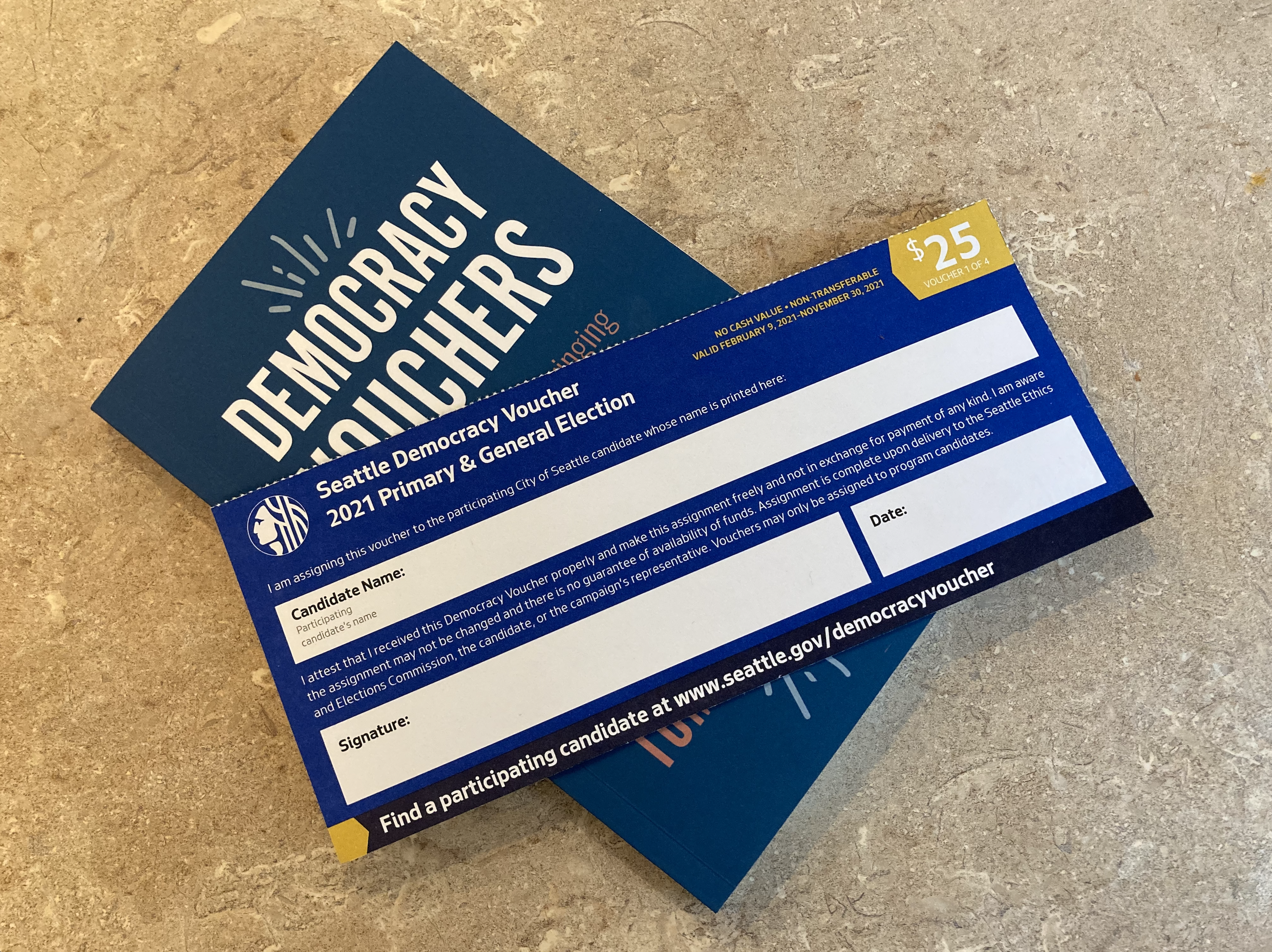
A democracy voucher issued for the 2021 primary and general elections in Seattle

The Seattle democracy voucher program was approved in a 2015 citywide referendum. Municipal elections in 2017 were the first year the program was implemented. It is the first program of its kind in the United States.

Under the program, each registered voter in Seattle received four $25 vouchers which they were eligible to give to any eligible candidates standing for election to municipal office (other Seattle residents who would normally be eligible to donate to campaigns could request vouchers as well). To be eligible, candidates must have

1. already raised between $1,500 and $6,000 from a minimum number of donors;
2. agreed to campaign finance restrictions, including accepting no more than $250 of non-voucher funds from any individual contributor (or $500 for candidates standing for the office of mayor), and
3. agreed to cap campaign spending to a determined limit. In addition, participating candidates must not have received any contributions from a person or organization with more than $250,000 in service contracts with the city. People who are not eligible to vote, such as permanent residents, were also eligible.

Seattle City Council members serve 4-year terms, with roughly half of the seats contested every other year. The program was funded by a $3 million citywide increase in the property tax. The system was "first come, first served", with just 47,000 vouchers honored.

The 2021 election was the first mayoral election to use democracy vouchers. During the primary election, the number of city residents contributing financially to election campaigns increased from 1.5 percent in 2017 to 3.6 percent in 2021.

== Outcomes ==
In 2022, a first of its kind study was conducted by the Journal of Public Economics on the effects of Seattle's democracy vouchers program for city council races within the two subsequent election cycles following the programs implementation. The study found a substantial increase in the number of unique donors at 350%, with a 53% increase in the total dollar amount of contributions, which the authors of the study attributed to the significant increase in small donations, or donations totaling less than $200.

Moreover, the study also saw a statistically significant increase in the number of candidates taking part in the elections, at 86%, with attendant decreases in the electoral success of incumbent candidates.

The total of contributions per city council race remained relatively stable from before and after the adoption of the program, at $2 million to 1.75 million, respectively. There was some evidence that suggested a slight depression of private donations compared to before the rollout of the program, though more scholarship and research on the subject is necessary to make any additional definitive claims.

== Oakland, California ==
In 2022, voters in Oakland, California, approved a "Democracy Dollars" program with 74% approval. It was modeled on the Seattle program, and will use money from the general fund. Budget pressure delayed the rollout from 2024 to 2026.

== Proposals ==
A similar plan was put forward by the 2020 presidential campaign of Andrew Yang. The campaign's "Democracy Dollars" would have given each registered voter $100 to put towards the political campaign of their choice annually.

In 2016 in a statewide ballot initiative, South Dakota voters supported a bill that included provisions for democracy vouchers as part of a larger ethics reform bill called "the government accountability and anti-corruption act". The democracy voucher part of this bill provided voters two $50-dollar vouchers to be given to state candidates. The bill passed with over 51% of the vote, but South Dakota Republicans repealed the bill in early 2017. An "emergency clause" was included in the repeal preventing resubmission of the ballot initiative.

Advocates in other cities have put forward similar proposals, including in Los Angeles, California. Los Angeles advocates have argued that democracy vouchers would lead to "a more diverse group of donors, and a more representative set of candidates and officeholders" were the policy enacted.

There have also been proposals for national democracy vouchers in Australia to improve political participation and party accountability.

== Response ==
Supporters argue that the program makes campaign donors more representative of the overall population, lets candidates fundraise for competitive campaigns without relying on big money, and limits the influence of special interests over elected officials.

Opponents claimed that, because the vouchers would be distributed ten months before the general election and were assigned on a first come, first served basis, the program would largely benefit incumbent political candidates rather than challengers, because the latter typically launch their campaigns at a later date than incumbents. As a result, they suggested that incumbents might receive all funds from the program, with available money completely depleted by the time challengers were able to organize campaigns.

In Elster vs. City of Seattle, two Seattle property owners sued the city of Seattle in King County Superior Court in 2017, alleging the Democracy Voucher program violated their First Amendment rights by using their tax contribution to subsidize political speech. The city responded with a motion to dismiss rather than engaging with the complaint, and the motion was granted by the court. The plaintiffs appealed the decision, and the case was taken up by the Washington State Supreme Court, who affirmed the lower court's decision.

== See also ==
- Government and politics of Seattle
- Washington State Public Disclosure Commission
