= Theodore Roosevelt V =

American diplomat (born 1942)

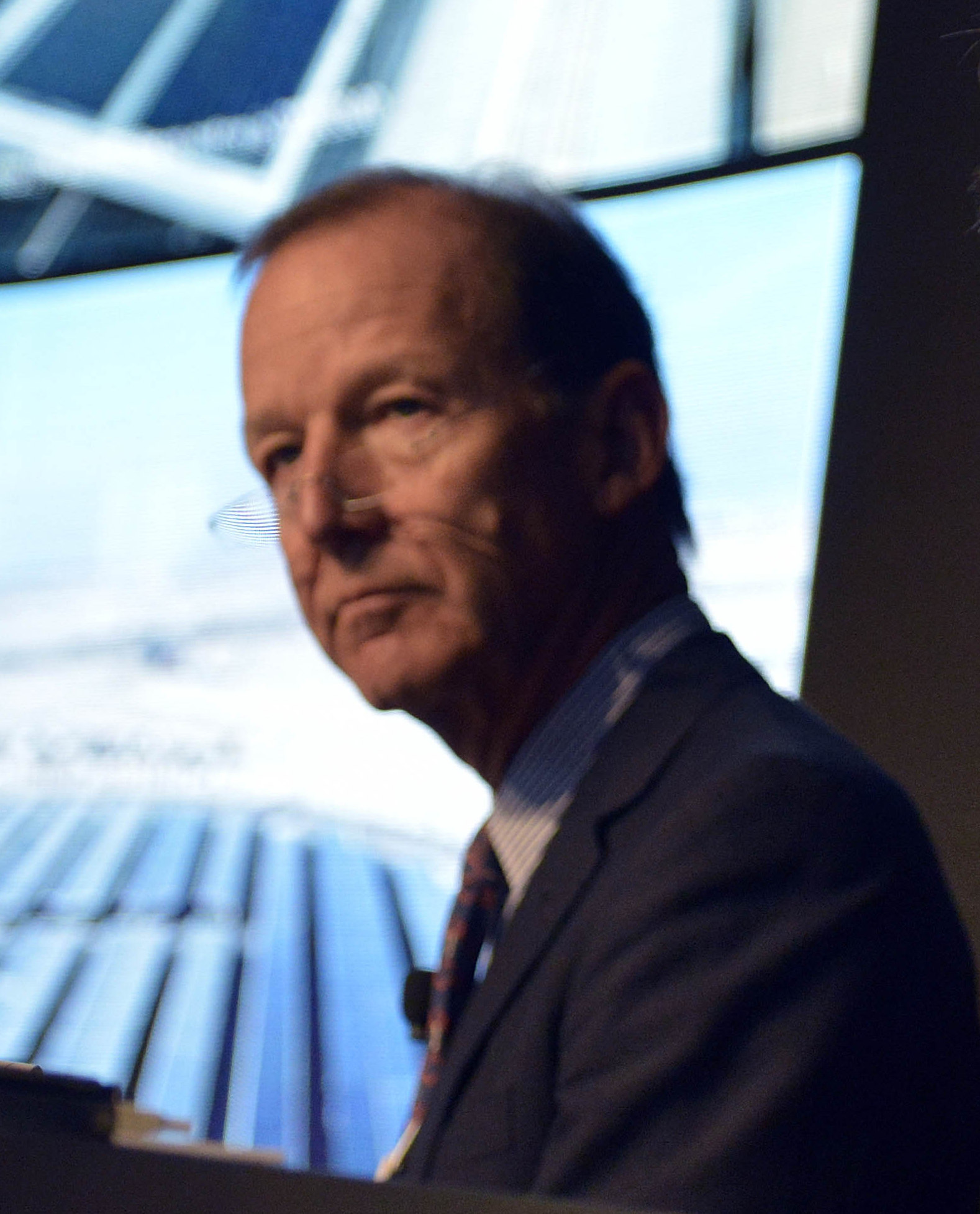
- Roosevelt at the World Economic Forum Annual Meeting of the New Champions in 2012
- Born: November 27, 1942 (age 83); Jacksonville, Florida, U.S.
- Education: Harvard University (BA, MBA)
- Known for: Business, Conservationist, Former Navy SEAL (1965–1974)
- Political party: Republican
- Spouse: Constance Lane Rogers (m. 1970)
- Children: 1
- Parent(s): Theodore Roosevelt IV; Anne Mason Babcock
- Relatives: Roosevelt family

Theodore Roosevelt V (/ˈroʊzəvɛlt/ ROH-zə-velt; born November 27, 1942), also called Theodore IV, is an American investment banker and managing director at Barclays Investment Bank. He is a member of the Council on Foreign Relations, the Economic Club of New York, and the Foreign Policy Association, and serves on the Advisory Council of Represent.Us, a nonpartisan anti-corruption organization. Roosevelt is also a prominent conservationist. His name suffix varies since his great-grandfather, President Theodore Roosevelt, was a son of Theodore Roosevelt Sr., though the same-named son did not commonly use a "Jr." name suffix.

== Early years ==
Theodore Roosevelt V was born on November 27, 1942. He is the only son of Theodore Roosevelt IV (1914–2001) and Anne Mason Babcock (1917–2001). Roosevelt earned a bachelor's degree from Harvard University in 1965. At Harvard, he was a member of the Porcellian Club. In 1972, Roosevelt earned an MBA from the Harvard Business School, where he was a member of the HBS Rugby Club.

Roosevelt is a great-grandson of President Theodore Roosevelt. As an Oyster Bay Roosevelt, and through his ancestor Cornelius Van Schaack Jr., he is a descendant of the Schuyler family. His maternal grandparents were George Wheeler Babcock (1879—1950) and Anne Mason Bonnycastle Robinson (1886—1923).

== Career ==
After college, he was commissioned as an ensign in the U.S. Naval Reserve on June 16, 1965, and served as a U.S. Navy officer with Underwater Demolition Team 11 (BUD/S Class 36). After completing BUDS he served for two years in Vietnam with the Navy SEALs. He remained in the Naval Reserve after leaving active duty and was promoted to lieutenant commander on April 1, 1974.

He would later then go onto serving in the U.S. State Department as a foreign service officer in Washington, D.C. and the Upper Volta.

=== Public service ===
Roosevelt is Chair of the Center for Climate and Energy Solutions, a Trustee of the Alliance for Climate Protection, a member of the Governing Council of The Wilderness Society (United States), and a Trustee for the American Museum of Natural History, the World Resources Institute, and The Cultural Institutions Retirement System. He is also a Counselor for the China–U.S. Center for Sustainable Development. He sits on the Advisory Council of the nonpartisan anti-corruption organization Represent.Us, where he served as a consultant in the crafting of the American Anti-Corruption Act.

At the Republican Convention in 2000, Roosevelt delivered an address on the environment. He gave the keynote speech at the National Governors Association Annual Meeting in 2001 as well as the keynote address at the Governors Conference on Climate Change in April 2008 sponsored by Yale University. Most recently, he spoke at the Conference of Parties Climate Summit in December 2009 in Copenhagen sponsored by the European Union Parliament.

On April 18, 2016, the day before the New York Republican primary, Roosevelt endorsed Ohio Governor John Kasich for president of the United States.

Roosevelt suggested on Twitter that Donald Trump was the "loser" following a report in The Atlantic that Trump chose not to visit an American military cemetery in France, with Trump allegedly saying "Why should I go to that cemetery? It's filled with losers."

== Personal life ==
In 1970, Roosevelt married Constance Lane Rogers. They have one son, Theodore Roosevelt VI, who was born in 1976.
