= Inter-American Convention Against Corruption =

- Signed: 29 March 1996
- Location: Caracas, Venezuela
- Effective: 6 March 1997
- Condition: 2 ratifications
- Parties: 34
- Depositary: General Secretariat of the Organization of American States
- Languages: English, French, Portuguese, and Spanish

The Inter-American Convention Against Corruption (IACAC) was adopted by the member countries of the Organization of American States on 29 March 1996; it came into force on 6 March 1997. It was the first international convention to address the question of corruption.

According to Article II of the convention's text, it has two goals:

1. To promote and strengthen the development by each of the States Parties of the mechanisms needed to prevent, detect, punish and eradicate corruption; and,
2. To promote, facilitate and regulate cooperation among the States Parties to ensure the effectiveness of measures and actions to prevent, detect, punish and eradicate corruption in the performance of public functions and acts of corruption specifically related to such performance.

== See also ==
- United Nations Convention against Corruption of 31 October 2003
