= United Federation =

United Federation may refer to:

== Organizations ==
- United Federation of Postal Clerks, the former name of the American Postal Workers Union
- United Federation of Teachers, a labor union that represents most teachers in New York City's public schools
- United Federation of Trade Unions, a trade union in Norway
- United Retail Federation, an Australian industrial organisation of employers

== In fiction ==
- United Federation of Planets, a fictional interstellar federal republic in the Star Trek science fiction franchise
- United Citizen Federation, a fictional government from the movie Starship Troopers
- United Federations, a fictional government from the movie The Fifth Element
- United Federation, a territory in Papers, Please
- United Federation, a fictional country from the Sonic the Hedgehog franchise
