= Josh Silver (nonprofit director) =

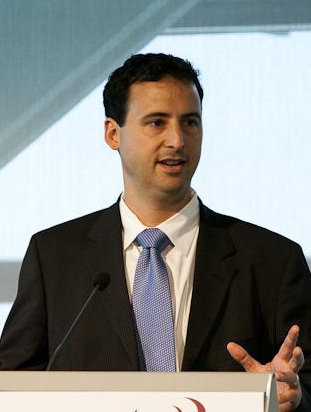
- Free Press event 2013
- Born: April 16, 1968 (age 57); New York City, United States
- Education: University of Grenoble; The Evergreen State College
- Occupation: Nonprofit director
- Employer: RepresentUs

Josh Silver (born April 16, 1968) is an American political consultant, and former nonprofit executive who is the co-founder of RepresentUs, a post-partisan, nonprofit organization whose stated mission is to build the movement that fixes America's corrupt political system. Silver formerly worked as CEO and co-founder of Free Press, an "activist group that promotes accountability journalism and Internet openness". Josh Silver left Free Press in 2011 to become founding CEO of the Democracy Fund. He was the director of development for a cultural arm of the Smithsonian Institution, and was the campaign manager of the successful 1998 "Clean Elections" ballot measure in Arizona. He has published on democracy, media, telecommunications, campaign finance and a range of other public policy issues. Silver has been profiled in the Wall Street Journal.

== Early life and education ==
In 1995, he was on a river trip in Peru with a friend, Patchen Miller, when they were ambushed and shot; Silver was seriously wounded but survived; Miller did not.

Silver attended The Evergreen State College in Olympia, Washington and The University of Grenoble in France.

== Views ==
Silver posits that a broken and corrupt political system has a paralyzing effect on nearly every issue. He advocates using the term "corruption" to describe the combined influence of lobbying, the "revolving door", and campaign contributions, as well as broken election laws that foster extremism and block competition. Silver sees this corruption as afflicting politicians of both parties.

Silver argues that past democracy reform efforts have failed partly because they were overly focused on appealing to the political Left and/or overly focused on passing reform legislation through Congress; he points out that members of Congress, who have achieved their positions under current election and campaign finance laws, are unlikely to approve legislation that would change those laws in order to increase political competition and/or limit the influence of the special interests and moneyed donors who have financed their political careers.

For over a decade, Silver advocated for a grassroots campaign of citizen-led legislative lobbying and ballot initiatives passed at the city and state level to fix policy locally while building momentum towards national reform. The organization he co-founded and directed until 2022, RepresentUs, was established to support these grassroots anti-corruption efforts.
