= Trevor Potter =

Lawyer and member of the United States Federal Election Commission

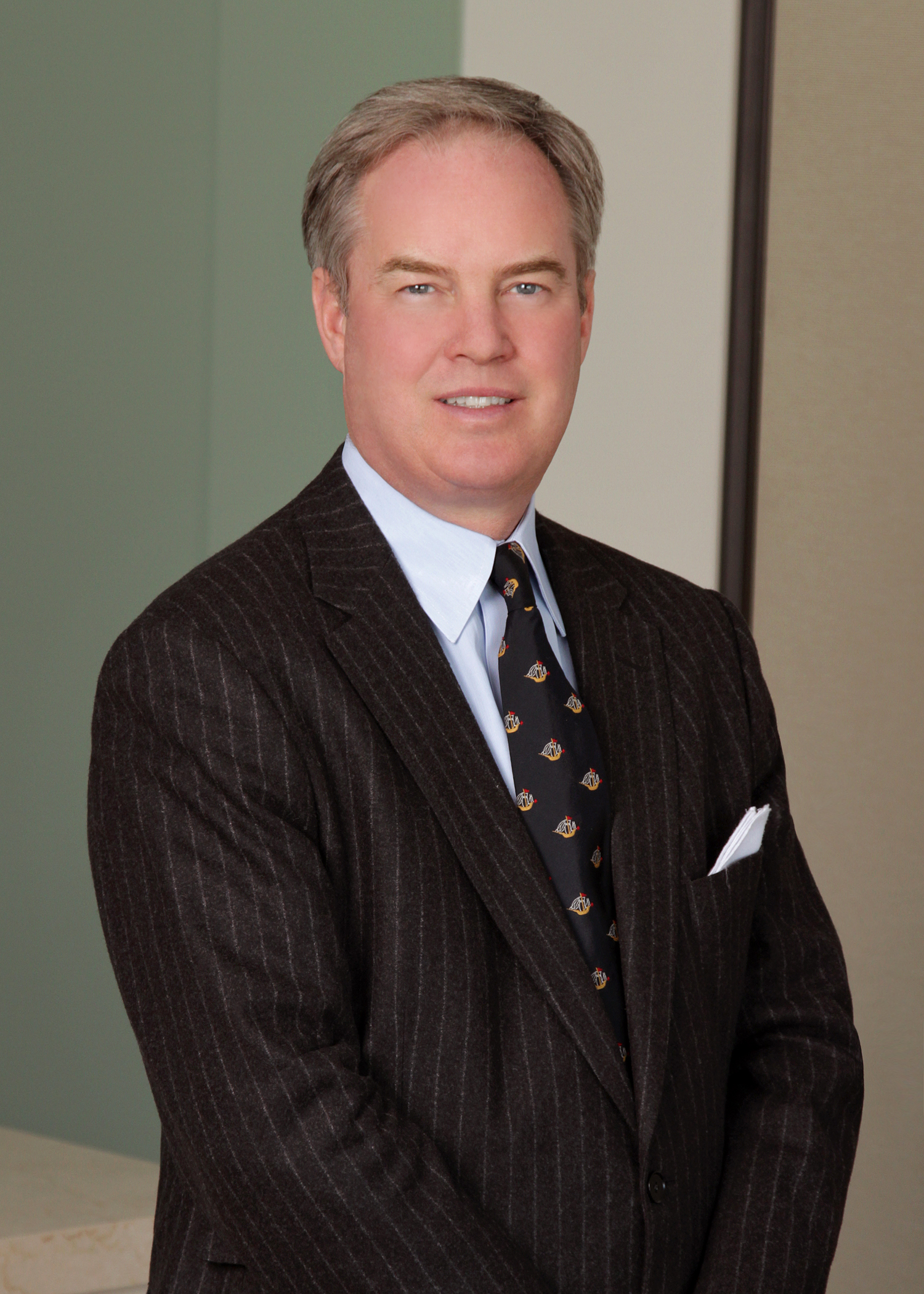
- Born: October 24, 1955 (age 70); Chicago, Illinois, U.S.
- Education: Harvard University (BA); University of Virginia (JD)
- Occupation: Lawyer
- Years active: 1982–present
- Political party: Republican

Trevor Alexander McClurg Potter (born October 24, 1955) is an American election lawyer who served as a commissioner and chairman of the United States Federal Election Commission (FEC). He was nominated as a Republican to the FEC by President George H.W. Bush and confirmed in 1991, serving until 1995. Potter is the founder and president of Campaign Legal Center, a nonpartisan nonprofit organization focused on voting rights, elections, campaign finance, redistricting, ethics and the rule of law. Potter is a vocal critic of unlimited corporate spending and dark money in politics allowed by the Supreme Court of the United States' Citizens United v. FEC ruling.

He has been described by the American Bar Association Journal as "hands-down one of the top lawyers in the country on the delicate intersection of politics, law and money".

== Early life and education ==
Potter attended Brooks School in North Andover, Massachusetts. He earned his Bachelor of Arts from Harvard University in 1978, and his Juris Doctor from University of Virginia School of Law in 1982.

== Career ==
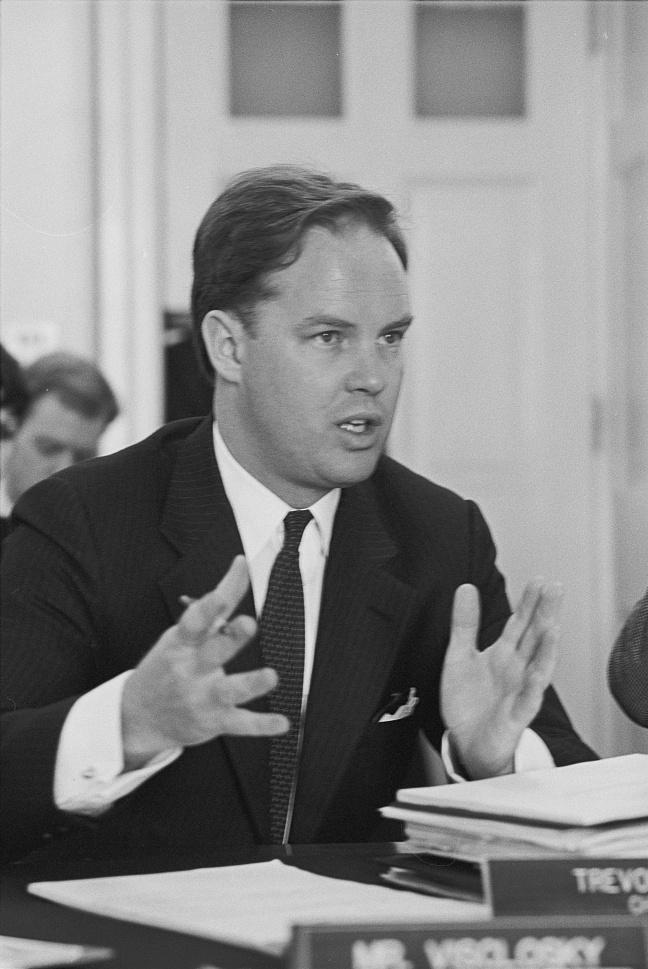
Potter giving testimony at a hearing of the House Appropriations Committee in March 1994

Potter's government experience includes service as assistant general counsel of the United States Federal Communications Commission (FCC) (1984–1985) and attorney with the United States Department of Justice (1982–1984). He served as General Counsel to the 2000 and 2008 Presidential campaigns of John McCain and Deputy General Counsel to the George H. W. Bush 1988 campaign.

Potter was an advisor to the drafters of the 2002 McCain-Feingold campaign finance law, the Bipartisan Campaign Reform Act (BCRA). In 2002, Potter co-founded Campaign Legal Center for the purpose of providing independent oversight of BCRA's implementation and defending the law from legal challenges. Campaign Legal Center's mission has since expanded to encompass additional issue areas, but it continues to be at the forefront of legal battles to enforce campaign finance laws and disclosure requirements.

Potter gained national attention for his legal guidance to comedian Stephen Colbert during the creation of the "Americans for a Better Tomorrow, Tomorrow" Super-PAC in 2011. Through humor and satire, Colbert and Potter highlighted the issues surrounding Super PACs and the role of money in politics. The Colbert Report's segments on "Super PACs" were recognized in 2011 with a Peabody Award for parody reporting as an "innovative means of teaching American viewers about the landmark court decision". Reflecting on the experience in 2015, Potter said, "I was his lawyer for the venture, which meant I did everything from drafting a Federal Election Commission Advisory Opinion Request to accompanying Colbert to hearings. I even figured out how to make the money "disappear" from public view when the PAC was closing. (Hint: It's not that hard.) ... The final takeaway from my work with Colbert was a sense of the enormous and detrimental impact Citizens United has had on our campaigns and elections." Speaking in 2014, Potter said:

[Colbert] was able to show America the loopholes (or "loop-chasms" as he called them) in the laws designed to regulate coordination between candidates and supposedly "independent" groups. By having his own Super PAC and 501(c)(4), Stephen could evolve right alongside the campaigns—or often be a step ahead of them. His understanding of the possibilities inherent in the legal confusion was keen enough to discover and exploit absurd legalities before it became clear that actual candidates and political activists were doing the same thing.

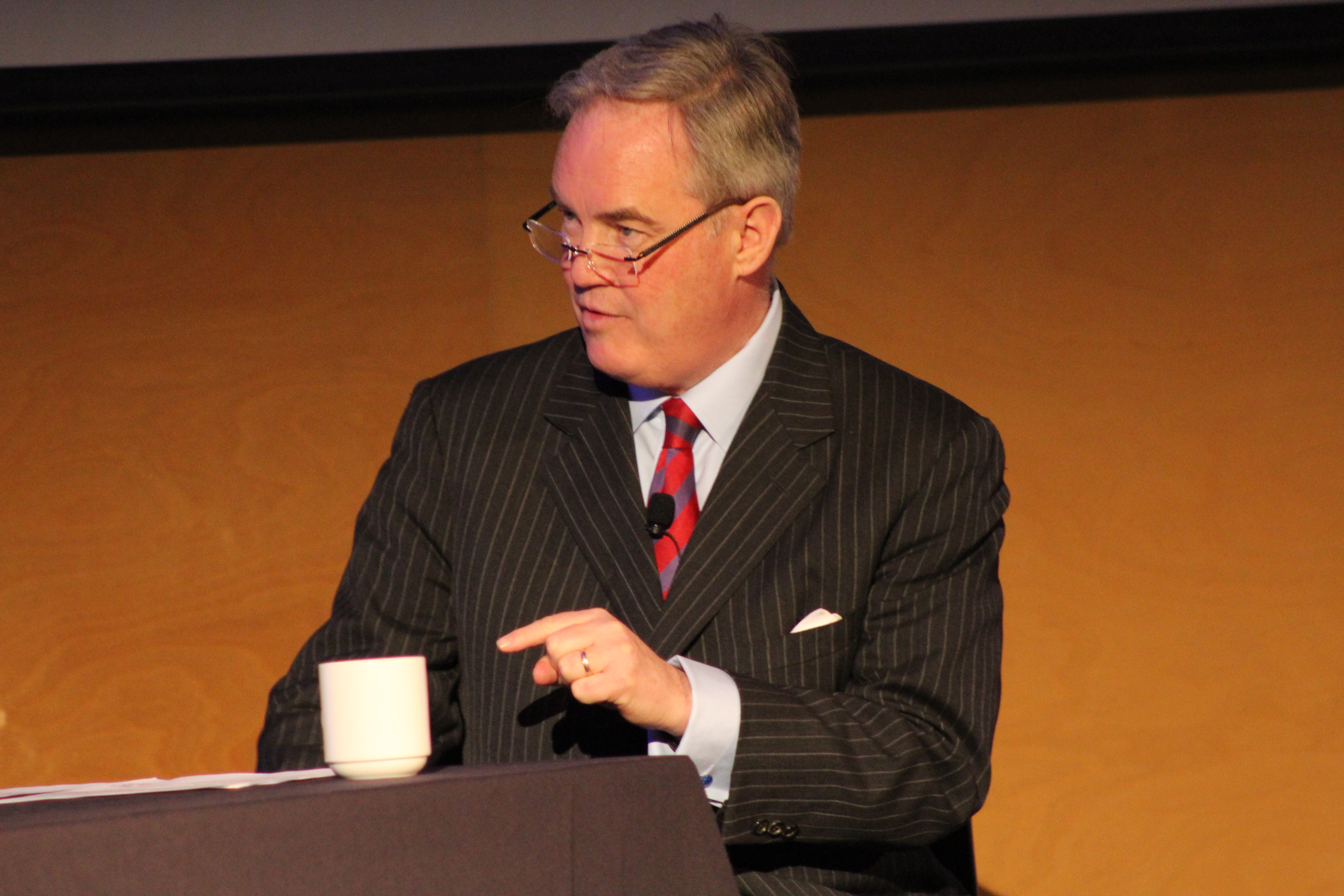
Potter at Tulane University in February 2018

Potter was elected to the American Law Institute in 2013 and serves as an Adviser on ALI's Principles of Election Law: Resolution of Election Disputes project.

== Works ==
- Anthony Corrado (Editor), Thomas E. Mann (Editor), Daniel R. Ortiz (Editor), Trevor Potter (Editor), Frank J. Sorauf (Editor), Campaign Finance Reform: A Sourcebook, Brookings Institution Press (1997), ISBN 978-0815715818
- Anthony Corrado (Editor), Thomas E. Mann (Editor), Trevor Potter (Editor), Inside the Campaign Finance Battle: Court Testimony on the New Reforms, Brookings Institution Press (2003), ISBN 978-0815715832
- Anthony Corrado, Thomas E. Mann, Daniel R. Ortiz, Trevor Potter, The New Campaign Finance Sourcebook, Brookings Institution Press (2005), ISBN 978-0815700050
- Trevor Potter, Political Activity, Lobbying Laws and Gift Rules Guide, Thomson West (2008), ISBN 978-0314979483
- Joseph Birkenstock, Trevor Potter, Political Activity, Lobbying Laws and Gift Rules Guide, 2009-2010 ed., LegalWorks (2009), ISBN 978-0314988300
- Joseph Birkenstock, Trevor Potter, Political Activity, Lobbying Laws and Gift Rules Guide, 2010-2011 ed., LegalWorks (2010), ISBN 978-0314999054
- Joseph Birkenstock, Trevor Potter, Political Activity, Lobbying Laws and Gift Rules Guide, 3d, 2011-2012 ed., LegalWorks (2011), ISBN 978-0314925923

== See also ==
- Federal Election Commission
- Dark Money (film)
