= James Freis =

American businessman (born 1970)

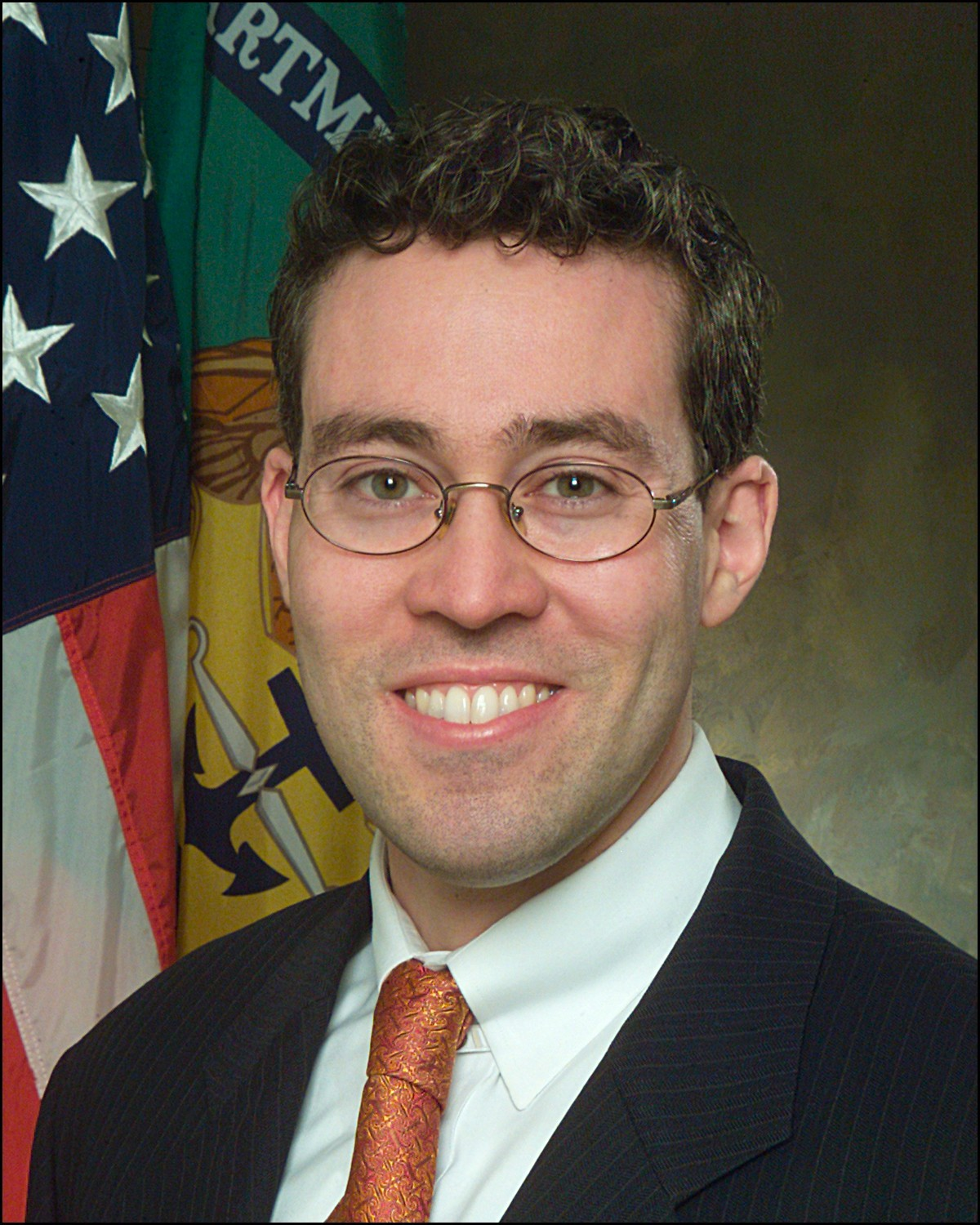

6th Director of the United States Treasury Department's Financial Crimes Enforcement Network
- In office March 2007 – September 2012
- President: George W. Bush; Barack Obama
- Preceded by: Robert W. Werner
- Succeeded by: Jennifer Shasky Calvery

Deputy Assistant General Counsel of the United States Department of the Treasury
- In office September 2005 – March 2007
- President: George W. Bush
- Preceded by: Office established
- Succeeded by: Mike Maher

Personal details
- Born: James H. Freis Jr. October 27, 1970 (age 55) Aberdeen, Maryland, U.S.
- Education: Georgetown University (AB); Harvard University (JD)
- Occupation: Attorney
- Awards: Cressey Award (2009); Treasury Medal (2012)
- Hometown: Metuchen, New Jersey

James H. Freis Jr. (born October 27, 1970) is an American lawyer and financial industry executive who from 2007 to 2012 served as the United States Department of the Treasury's 6th Director of the Financial Crimes Enforcement Network (FinCEN), where he expanded the scope of the anti-money laundering regulations and became known for spearheading efforts to combat fraud and implementing modern data analysis. He was an attorney and central banker at the Federal Reserve Bank of New York and the Bank for International Settlements.

From 2014 to 2020, he was the Group Chief Compliance Officer of the Deutsche Börse Group, Europe's largest provider of systemically significant financial market infrastructures. In June 2020, he joined Wirecard AG, where he is credited for promptly substantiating and initiating actions to stop the largest financial fraud in Germany's modern history, known publicly as the Wirecard scandal. Since 2021, he has been active with fintech and startup companies.

== Early life and education ==
Freis was born in Aberdeen, Maryland, to James Henry Freis and Maria Freis, and raised in Metuchen, New Jersey, where he attended St. Joseph High School. His mother is a retired nurse and social worker. His father, who died in August 2020, was a first-generation student at St. Peter's College, graduating cum laude in 1966. He graduated in 1969 from Villanova Law School, before departing to Germany with the U.S. Army from 1970 to 1972. Freis Sr. spent his career practicing corporate law with a single law firm, which later became Drinker Biddle & Reath through mergers.

Freis attended Georgetown University, graduating magna cum laude in 1992 with an A.B. in economics with honors and government/international relations, a certificate in German area studies and Phi Beta Kappa. While at Georgetown, he competed on the varsity heavyweight rowing crew. He then earned his Juris Doctor cum laude from Harvard Law School in 1995. While at Harvard, Freis was a Senior Editor of the Harvard Environmental Law Review. He became a Chartered Financial Analyst charterholder in 2002.

After graduating from Harvard, Freis served as a fellow of the Robert Bosch Foundation in Germany. From 1995 to 1996 he worked in the German Federal Banking Supervisory Office in Berlin and Bayerische Vereinsbank, a German universal bank in Munich.

== Early career ==
=== Federal Reserve Bank of New York ===
Freis joined the Federal Reserve Bank of New York's legal department as an Attorney in 1996, where he advised on financial market regulations, payment and settlement system issues at wholesale and retail levels, and foreign government and central bank accounts. He worked on the successful defense before the Iran–United States Claims Tribunal of claims brought against the Bank by the Central Bank of Iran arising out of the hostage crisis.

=== Bank for International Settlements ===
In 1999, Freis moved to Basel, Switzerland and became Senior Counsel in the Legal Service at the Bank for International Settlements, an international organization known as the "bank for central banks." There he supported the provision of financial services to central banks; advised on international law such as privileges and immunities; and supported the Basel-based experts’ committees of global financial standard setters, through 2005.

== United States Department of the Treasury ==
Freis joined the United States Department of the Treasury in September 2005 as the first-ever Deputy Assistant General Counsel for Enforcement & Intelligence. Freis provided legal support and helped staff the Treasury's Office of Terrorism and Financial Intelligence which was created in 2004, including supervising the legal counsel to the Financial Crimes Enforcement Network, the Office of Foreign Assets Control, and the Treasury Executive Office for Asset Forfeiture.

Freis served as lead negotiator on behalf of the United States Government on sensitive counter-terrorism programs and contributed to the Terrorist Finance Tracking Program, and was also responsible for developing international financial measures against rogue states, such as part of Treasury's efforts against Iran and North Korea.

=== Financial Crimes Enforcement Network (FinCEN) ===
Freis was appointed Director (CEO) of the Financial Crimes Enforcement Network (FinCEN) on March 5, 2007, by United States Secretary of the Treasury Hank Paulson. At the time, FinCEN's mission was "to safeguard the financial system from the abuses of financial crime, including terrorist financing, money laundering, and other illicit activity." FinCEN had faced criticism from the financial industry over difficulties of complying with anti-money laundering regulations, which had been expanded in 2001 under USA PATRIOT Act, Title III. On June 22, 2006, Secretary Paulson visited FinCEN and together with Director Freis launched initiatives to improve FinCEN's Regulatory efficiency and effectiveness.

Freis also oversaw FinCEN's broad IT Modernization Program to collect, analyze, and share data collected under FinCEN's regulatory authority, estimated to cost $120 million. While earlier FinCEN IT projects had failed, under Freis the modernization project was managed on time and budget.

On the regulatory front, Freis expanded cooperation with State financial services regulators, and he expanded FinCEN's regulations to non-bank mortgage lenders, Fannie Mae and Freddie Mac, and initiated the rules for investment advisors. He amended the regulations for money services businesses and in July 2011, issued regulations for "prepaid access." The latter changes formed the basis for FinCEN regulation of virtual currency. In testifying before the Congress, Freis explained, "Recognizing that payment systems evolve rapidly,... The rule was developed to be technologically neutral and hopefully cover new developments for years to come."

Freis initiated rulemaking requiring financial institutions to collect information on beneficial owners of accounts. The final rule was issued in 2016, at which time President Obama in referencing the regulation “call[ed] on Congress to pass new legislation that requires all companies formed inside the United States to report information about their real owners to the Treasury Department's Financial Crimes Enforcement Network." On December 11, 2020, Congress mandated the remaining component of the decade old policy proposal, by including in the National Defense Authorization Act of 2021 a chapter expanding FinCEN's powers, most prominently requiring companies to disclose information about their beneficial owners which would be available to law enforcement through a national database to be developed and maintained by FinCEN. Freis also initiated rulemaking to implement a Congressional mandate to collect data on cross-border electronic transfers of funds, which was supported by law enforcement but faced criticism from the financial industry for potentially collecting too much data, and which has not yet been implemented.

On an international basis, Freis also oversaw FinCEN's role as the financial intelligence unit of the United States, and a member of the Egmont Group of Financial Intelligence Units. He promoted greater sharing of information among financial institutions, including on a cross-border basis. Under Freis, FinCEN worked closely with counterpart regulators and the financial intelligence unit in Mexico, and in law enforcement efforts along the Southwest Border.

Freis left FinCEN after an apparent disagreement over how independent FinCEN should be as a Bureau of the Treasury Department. In September 2012, he was awarded the Treasury Medal as the longest serving FinCEN Director.

== Post-Treasury career ==
In January 2013, Freis joined the international law firm Cleary Gottlieb Steen & Hamilton as counsel based in its Washington, D.C., office. He joined the firm's international banking and financial institutions practice and also advised on enforcement and regulatory matters.

=== Deutsche Börse Group ===
He was appointed effective April 1, 2014, as the new Chief Compliance Officer for the Deutsche Börse Group, to oversee compliance as well as responsibilities towards supervisory authorities, among all Group entities. Based in Frankfurt, Germany, the international financial market infrastructure provider includes the Frankfurt Stock Exchange; the Eurex Exchange offering futures and options derivatives; Eurex Clearing central counterparty (CCP); Clearstream, the International Central Securities Depository (ICSD); commodities and FX trading platforms; and various IT, financial index providers, and analytics businesses. Freis served concurrently as the Chief Compliance Officer for the Clearstream Group holding company with about EUR 15 trillion in assets under custody.

=== Wirecard ===
On May 8, 2020, Wirecard AG, the payments processor and financial services provider based in Germany announced that effective July 1, 2020, James Freis would be joining as executive board member ("Vorstand"). Wirecard had faced criticism and allegations of accounting irregularities over the prior two decades as it grew globally, but that notwithstanding, by 2018 it had become a member of the DAX stock index of German blue chip companies. Wirecard was viewed as needing a "new start."

Freis's appointment was described as part of a "comprehensive change" in the management board, and he would be responsible for a newly created department "Integrity, Legal and Compliance." Together with the announcement of Freis's appointment, then CEO Markus Braun apologized for past turbulence at Wirecard, and both he and chairman of the supervisory board, Thomas Eichelmann, described Wirecard's business model as "sustainable and highly profitable."

On June 18, 2020, Wirecard announced Freis had joined the management board with immediate effect, earlier than his planned start date of July 1. Later that evening, Freis was introduced by Markus Braun in a video in which Braun announced that Wirecard might have been the victim of fraud in connection with its funds held in overseas bank trustee accounts. Working through the night to investigate, Freis quickly concluded that there was obvious fraud in the purported Wirecard accounts and in the morning informed the supervisory board.

On June 19, 2020, Wirecard announced the resignation of Markus Braun as CEO and the appointment of James Freis, one day after being appointed to the management board, as interim CEO with sole power of representation. After working through the weekend in reviewing the company's business activities and finances, Freis wrote an announcement published by Wirecard in the early morning of Monday, June 22, 2020, that the bank trustee account balances in the amount of 1.9 billion euro likely did not exist, and that previous Wirecard descriptions of its so-called third party acquiring business were not correct. Freis was in constructive discussions with Wirecard's lending banks and was considering restructuring options, yet from Thursday to Monday, Wirecard's stock price had lost 90% of its value.

On June 25, 2020, less than a full week after having joined Wirecard, Freis decided to initiate insolvency proceedings. Bank creditors of Wirecard had been willing to roll over credit lines for a period of months, and some initially criticized Freis for the decision to place Wirecard into insolvency, because they became forced to book losses immediately. A year later, the insolvency administrator had generated only about €600 million selling most of Wirecard's assets, against more than €3 billion in banks and bondholder claims, and over €14 billion of total claims filed in the insolvency proceedings.

Freis continued to oversee day-to-day operations of Wirecard, and announced to staff on September 11, 2020, that he was stepping down from management at Wirecard. The Wirecard scandal is likened to a "German Enron" in light of the company's inflated financial accounts and failure of its auditors to detect them and as the greatest financial fraud in modern German history.

In September 2020, the German Parliament launched an investigation of Wirecard generating voluminous records through the June 2021 final reports. Opposition lawmakers characterized the Wirecard scandal as a “collective failure of supervision”, criticizing numerous government authorities, the board of directors, and auditors.

== 2021–present ==
More recently, Freis has founded a consulting firm advising on financial regulation and good governance.

He is active with fintech and startup companies, including these affiliations:

- Advisory Board of Starling, a RegTech applied behavioral sciences technology company.
- Co-founder and Chairman of CRINDATA, offering financial institutions solutions for operational risk management to oversee outsourcing and third party service providers.
- Advisor to Moonpay, which serves as an on-ramp for customers to buy crypto, and is active in NFTs.
- Regulatory Technology Officer to FQX AG, a Blockchain startup in Switzerland, leading a project to compose programmable corporate debt offerings stored as NFTs on blockchain.

== Memberships ==
As an attorney, Freis is a member of the bar associations of New York, New Jersey and the District of Columbia. Current affiliations include:

- The Committee on International Monetary Law of the International Law Association (MOCOMILA)
- Council on Foreign Relations
