= Cevdet Caner =

Austrian entrepreneur

- Born: July 1973 (age 52); Austria
- Occupations: Businessman, real estate entrepreneur
- Known for: Founder of Level One, CEO of Aggregate Holdings (2022–2025), Principal shareholder of NIU Invest

Cevdet Caner (born July 1973) is an Austrian businessman and real estate entrepreneur. He is the principal shareholder of NIU Invest and the former chief executive of Aggregate Holdings. He resides in Monaco.

Caner founded his first business, Call and Logistik Center (CLC), during his undergraduate studies in the mid-1990s; the company, which provided call center services, food delivery logistics, and a phone directory, held its initial public offering in Austria in 2001. After leaving CLC in 2002, Caner became a major investor in the European real estate market, particularly in Germany, through his company Level One and later as an investor in the publicly traded real estate conglomerate Adler Group. He was CEO of Aggregate Holdings, an Adler shareholder, from mid-2022 until early 2025.

Through NIU Invest, founded in 2022, Caner has investments in the mining and real estate sectors, including mining assets in Chile, Botswana, the United States, and the Democratic Republic of the Congo (DRC). NIU describes its investment strategy as focusing on critical minerals positioned to rise in demand with the growth of sectors like semiconductors, electric vehicles, and alternative energy.

== Early life and education ==
Caner was born in Austria. He grew up in Linz, where he attended high school and graduated in 1994.

Caner was active in youth politics, and was president of the Socialist Youth Austria (SJÖ) in Linz. He founded his first company, CLC, while studying business administration. He left university without a degree after starting the company.

== Career ==
In 1997, Caner founded Call & Logistik Center GesmbH (CLC) and became its managing director. In 2001, he listed CLC on the Vienna Stock Exchange with a turnover of EUR 34 million. CLC then took over the larger call centre group Camelot. After three years, Caner sold his shares and left the company. By 2004, CLC was bankrupt and ceased operations shortly afterwards. Caner and media have attributed CLC’s bankruptcy to a change in the company’s strategy after his departure.

In 2005, Caner founded the real estate holding company Level One, registered on the Channel Island of Jersey. By 2008, the portfolio had grown to around 28,000 residential units with a total value of 1.85 billion euros. Credit Suisse, JP Morgan, Royal Bank of Scotland and other British firms invested into Level One. Credit Suisse, the largest lender, approved a total of €1.3 billion in loans to Level One, and was leading bank for the IPO planned for March 2007. Level One’s IPO plans were postponed amid the subprime crisis.

In 2008, the real estate group filed for bankruptcy for its German property companies. Around 20,000 apartments and 500 commercial properties, primarily in Berlin and eastern Germany, were affected. Credit Suisse’s creditors accused Level One’s management, including Caner, of fraud and misappropriating the company’s assets. Caner attributed the company’s collapse to Credit Suisse’s reneging on agreed bridge financing in order to seize control of the company.

German and Austrian authorities investigated the matter, with German authorities closing their inquiry by 2012 after finding that there was insufficient evidence of wrongdoing. Austrian prosecutors continued their investigation for several years without charging Caner, who secured a 2018 judgment from the European Court of Human Rights finding that the prolonged investigation without charges violated his rights to fair judicial process. Austrian prosecutors charged Caner and five other Level One executives shortly after the ECHR decision, with a Vienna court fully acquitting all the defendants in 2020.

In late 2021, controversial short-seller research firm Viceroy Research published a report making various allegations against Adler Group, a publicly traded German real estate conglomerate, indicating that Caner, a longtime investor, held improper influence over its operations. The Viceroy report received extensive coverage in English- and German- language media and led to probes by German financial regulators and prosecutors of Adler’s accounting, including 2023 searches of Adler’s and Caner’s offices as part of an investigation by the Frankfurt am Main Public Prosecutor’s Office.

German financial regulator BaFin ultimately closed its investigation of Adler in December 2023 without ordering any corrections or imposing fines, although it disagreed with some of Adler’s property valuations. A forensic audit by KPMG also was unable to confirm the allegations in Viceroy’s report. Adler announced in late 2024 that its auditors had found no wrongdoing in their review of the group’s books.
