= John Hempton =

Australian investor

John Hempton is an Australian investor. He is the founder, co-owner and CIO of Bronte Capital Management Pty Ltd, a hedge fund management company.

== Career ==
Hempton was educated at Sydney Boys High School and received a Bachelor in Economics from the University of Adelaide in 1991. He later worked at the Australian Treasury until 1997 mostly on tax policy and analysing accounts to investigate company tax avoidance. He then worked for the ANZ Bank in strategic planning through 1997. Between 1998 and 1999 Hempton was the Chief Analyst of Tax Policies in New Zealand Treasury, In 1999 he joined Platinum Asset Management which was started by billionaire Kerr Neilson.

Hempton was the Head of Financials at Platinum Asset Management and the youngest partner at the firm. The company listed in on the Australian Securities Exchange in 2007. Hempton retired at age 39 but later founded Bronte Capital in 2009. The company manages over US$1 Billion dollars for investors including the former Australian Prime Minister Malcolm Turnbull.

=== Wirecard ===
Hempton began to suspect irregularities at German payments company Wirecard in 2012 following a Wirecard acquisition in Indonesia, and in 2014 he tipped off Financial Times journalist Dan McCrum. While the firm did collapse in 2020 following McCrum's investigation, Hempton's fund lost money in his short positions, as many had expired prior to Wirecard's collapse.

=== Valeant ===
He repeatedly warned investors of problems at Valeant Pharmaceuticals between 2014 and 2017, including billionaire investors and traders such as Bill Ackman and Bill Miller, prior to its share price collapsing. Hempton made US$5 million profit on short selling Valeant stock.

Hempton appeared as himself in the Netflix series Dirty Money in the episode Drug Short.

=== Herbalife ===
Hempton's conflict with Ackman is not confined to Valeant. Ackman announced as US$1 billion short on Herbalife in late 2012 claiming that the company was a pyramid scheme preying on low income earners. Although mid-2013 Hempton appeared on CNBC stating that Herbalife were “scumbags” but that he was still investing in them. Hempton has since researched the company further and continued to invest in it while viewing it as highly ethical. In 2018 Ackman exited his near billion-dollar investment position against Herbalife after the company's stock price continued to rise.
