= U Account =

Defunct UK digital current-account alternative

- Industry: Financial services
- Founded: 2012
- Headquarters: Sheffield, United Kingdom
- Key people: Sam Hardwick (General Manager)
- Products: Current account alternative
- Website: www.uaccount.uk

U Account is a UK-based digital current account alternative founded by Alex Letts, ex-owner of Ffrees Family Finance, and U Holdings Ltd. In 2019, the business was acquired by Shelby Finance Ltd, a subsidiary of Morses Club PLC. U Account is closing in May 2022.

== History ==
With backing from Finance Yorkshire, U was originally founded as Ffrees in Sheffield in 2012 as a family savings initiative and a modern-day challenger to the 'Big Four' banks. In 2019, U was bought by U Holdings Ltd, a company with the same team and management that founded the product under Ffrees Family Finance. In June 2019, U Holdings Ltd was acquired by Shelby Finance Ltd, a subsidiary of Morses Club PLC.

The company now trades under the name of U Account.

Since launch, U Account has secured £11m of funding from UK and citywide investors and amassed over 50,000 account holders.

== Technology ==
The U platform integrates multiple banking systems, including those of partners GPS, Bottomline Technologies and Wirecard in a centralised account.

In early 2017, U added a free Android and iOS mobile app to its existing product offerings. With the app, users can check their account balance as well as view recent transaction history, transfer money to and from sub-accounts known as 'Extra Accounts' and seek help and support. Work is currently in progress on the development of functionalities surrounding card status and activation, as well as external payments.

In April 2018, U integrated PayPoint, enabling their customers to pay cash into their accounts at any of the 29,000 participating retailers in the UK. PayPoint integration has been a significant development for U Account holders, who had previously only been able to add funds via BACS or Faster Payment.

In June 2020, U was forced to temporarily suspend activities on customer's accounts due to an investigation into their card provider, Wirecard, by the Financial Conduct Authority (FCA).
