= Alphaville =

Alphaville may refer to:

== Arts and entertainment ==
- Alphaville (film), a 1965 French science fiction film directed by Jean-Luc Godard
- Alphaville (band), a German music group
- Alphaville, album from the metal band Imperial Triumphant
- "Alphaville", a song from Bryan Ferry's 2010 album Olympia
- Alphaville, a fictional city in The Sims Online game
- Alphaville, a fictional city in ALPH, a science fiction novel by Charles Eric Maine
- FT Alphaville, a blog-style online publication of the Financial Times newspaper

== Other uses ==
- Alphaville, São Paulo, a real estate and gated communities development in Brazil

== See also ==
- Lost in Alphaville, 2014 album by The Rentals
