= Hempton (surname) =

Hempton is a surname. Notable people with the surname include:

- Celia Hempton (born 1981), British artist
- David N. Hempton (born 1952), Northern Irish historian
- John Hempton, Australian investor
