= Greinke =

Greinke is a surname. Notable people with the surname include:

- Gary Greinke, Australian rugby league player and coach
- Jeff Greinke (born 1959), American ambient music and jazz artist
- Zack Greinke (born 1983), Major League Baseball pitcher

== See also ==
- Grenke, German company
