= Educomp Solutions =

Indian educational technology company

Educomp Solutions Limited
- Native name: एडुकॉम्प सॉल्यूशंस
- Company type: Public company
- Traded as: BSE: 532696; NSE: EDUCOMP
- Industry: Educational technology
- Founded: September 7, 1994; 31 years ago
- Founder: Shantanu Prakash
- Headquarters: 514 Udyog Vihar Phase III, Gurgaon, Haryana 122001, India
- Area served: Worldwide
- Website: www.educomp.com

Educomp Solutions Limited (ESL) is an Indian multinational educational technology company, headquartered in Gurgaon, Haryana, India. Founded in 1994 as a private limited company by Shantanu Prakash, it has offices across 18 Indian states besides having overseas presence in Singapore and the United States. The company was popular for its flagship product Educomp Smartclass which once served thousands of schools in India, United States, Canada, Singapore and Sri Lanka before the brand's acquisition by Ebix in 2018. It was once described as India's largest technology-driven education company by The Economic Times.

== History ==
Educomp Solutions Limited was founded as a private limited company by Shantanu Prakash, an alumnus of Indian Institute of Management Ahmedabad and Shri Ram College of Commerce in September 1994. The organization was engaged the business of setting up and maintaining of computer labs in private schools under the BOOT model and in government-run schools under subcontracts awarded by Indian government undertakings. The company launched eCampus and PlanetVidya.com in 1998. In 2000, the company started its trading operations with CD-ROMs. In September 2000, the firm was converted into a public limited company. In October 2000, the company received a US$2.5 million strategic investment from The Carlyle Group. The company entered the India's e-learning market in 2002 by launching LearningMate in partnership with US-based educational technology company Blackboard Inc. In June 2003, it launched Educomp Smartclass, a hardware for digitally equipping classrooms. In August 2004, it entered the American market by signing a US pilot project with Santa Barbara-based Franklin Elementary School. In 2005, Educomp was conferred the "CNBC-ICICI Bank Emerging India Award" as the ‘Company of the year 2005’ in the ICE and ITeS category. In 2008, it acquired 51% stake in Takshila Management Services. The company was on the height of its success between the years 2008 and 2012. In 2013, the firm signed a memorandum of understanding with Singapore's Raffles Institution. In July 2016, ESL announced a joint venture called Ebix Educomp Solutions in which ESL held 49% stake, while the remaining 51% stake is held by Ebix Software. In May 2017, the company filed for insolvency in National Company Law Tribunal. In January 2018, Educomp launched an e-learning platform, SmartclassOnline. In April 2018, Ebix purchased a majority stake of US$8 million for Smartclass Educational Services Pvt. Ltd (SESPL), thus paving the way for the former to enter India's 30 billion dollar digital education market. In May 2018, the International Finance Corporation submitted a petition to the National Company Law Tribunal asking to probe Educomp's alleged 'preferential transactions' after the company filed for bankruptcy. In June 2021, the State Bank of India filed a criminal complaint with the Central Bureau of Investigation accusing former director Rajat Khare of Appin and others of embezzling ₹8.06 billion ($97 million) from loans to Educomp. In September 2021, Supreme Court of India rejected Ebix's plea to withdraw its ₹4 billion offer for Educomp.
