= Dan McCrum =

English journalist (born 1978/1979)

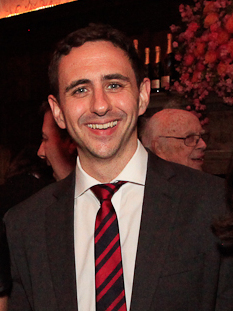
- McCrum in 2013
- Born: 1978 or 1979 (age 47–48)
- Education: Durham University
- Occupations: Journalist, writer
- Organization: Financial Times

Dan McCrum (born 1978/1979) is an English journalist who is an investigative journalist for the Financial Times, having joined the newspaper in 2007. He is best known for his investigation into the Wirecard scandal between 2014 and 2020. McCrum's 2022 book on the scandal Money Men: A Hot Startup, A Billion Dollar Fraud, A Fight for the Truth was adapted by Netflix as the documentary called Skandal!.

== Career ==
According to McCrum's personal website, he had worked as a paperboy at a newsagent's shop owned by his family, and lives with them in St Albans.

McCrum read economics and politics at Durham University (University College), graduating in 2001. He then worked at Citigroup as part of its equity research department. He began writing for the Investors Chronicle in 2006, and joined the Financial Times in 2007 as a reporter. Early in his Financial Times career, McCrum covered the 2008 financial crisis and the Madoff investment scandal from New York as the paper's US investment correspondent. In 2011, he joined the FT Alphaville team, writing for the commentary until 2015.

=== Wirecard scandal ===
In summer 2014, McCrum received a tip from hedge fund manager John Hempton on potential fraud at Wirecard, a German financial services firm. Following an investigation, McCrum noticed a number of acquisitions of obscure Asian firms by Wirecard. After a trip to Manama, Bahrain found an apparent local client of Wirecard to be bogus, McCrum brought his findings back to Alphaville. His initial findings were published in 2015. In response to the publication, Wirecard executive Jan Marsalek arranged several meetings with Alphaville founder Paul Murphy, attempting to persuade Murphy to prevent further investigation into Wirecard.

In 2018, McCrum received 70 GBs of leaked email correspondence from a former Wirecard lawyer. After analysing the acquired information for several months, his findings were published on 30 January 2019. The publication, and a follow-up article, resulted in Wirecard's valuation falling by €8 billion, with the German Federal Financial Supervisory Authority banning the short selling of Wirecard stock and German prosecutors opening investigations into the Financial Times. During this period, McCrum continued investigating Wirecard's claimed Asian clients along with Singapore correspondent Stephania Palma. Another story related to the newer investigation was published on 28 March, and on 15 October, the paper had published an article directly accusing Wirecard of committing fraud. Prosecutors based in Munich opened an investigation into McCrum and Palma, who were accused of market manipulation regarding the investigation. In the following year, as auditors scrutinised the company, the scale of the fraud became public and Wirecard declared bankruptcy in 2020. According to later German investigators, it was the largest case of financial fraud in the country's history. McCrum also testified before a German parliamentary committee regarding the scandal in 2020. The investigation into McCrum and Palma was dropped in September 2020.

McCrum was later named Journalist of the Year in 2020 by the Press Gazette for his role in the Wirecard investigation. He received the 2021 Gerald Loeb Award for Breaking News and Gerald Loeb Award for Investigative for his Wirecard articles. He published his accounts of the investigation as a book in 2022, and the investigation was subject to a documentary at Netflix.

=== Other works ===
McCrum has also written investigative pieces on accounting issues at UK law firm Quindell, Greek firm Folli Follie and Indian conglomerate Adani Group.
