= Jennifer Shasky Calvery =

American attorney

7th Director of the United States Treasury Department's Financial Crimes Enforcement Network
- In office September 2012 – May 2016
- President: Barack Obama
- Preceded by: James Freis

Personal details
- Education: George Washington University (BA), University of Arizona College of Law (JD)
- Occupation: Attorney

Jennifer Shasky Calvery is an American attorney. She is the global head of financial crime threat mitigation for HSBC. She served as director of the U.S. Treasury Department's Financial Crimes Enforcement Network (FinCEN) from September 2012 to May 2016.

== Education ==
Calvery holds a JD from the University of Arizona College of Law. She graduated summa cum laude with a BA in international affairs from George Washington University's Elliott School of International Affairs, where she was also an All-American basketball player.

== Career ==
Working to prosecute money-laundering and related crimes, she spent 15 years at the U.S. Department of Justice, including as an Organized Crime and Racketeering Section prosecutor, and two years as senior counsel with the Office of the Deputy Attorney General, through two federal administrations.

She was director of Treasury's Financial Crimes Enforcement Network (FinCEN) from September 22, 2012, until May 27, 2016.

During her tenure at FinCEN, while representing the Asset Forfeiture and Money Laundering Section of the Department of Justice, had been "considering seeking a guilty plea from HSBC" as early as September 2012.

On April 16, 2016, she announced she would be leaving the position effective on May 27, 2016, to join banking group HSBC.
