= Wirecard scandal =

Series of accounting scandals in Germany

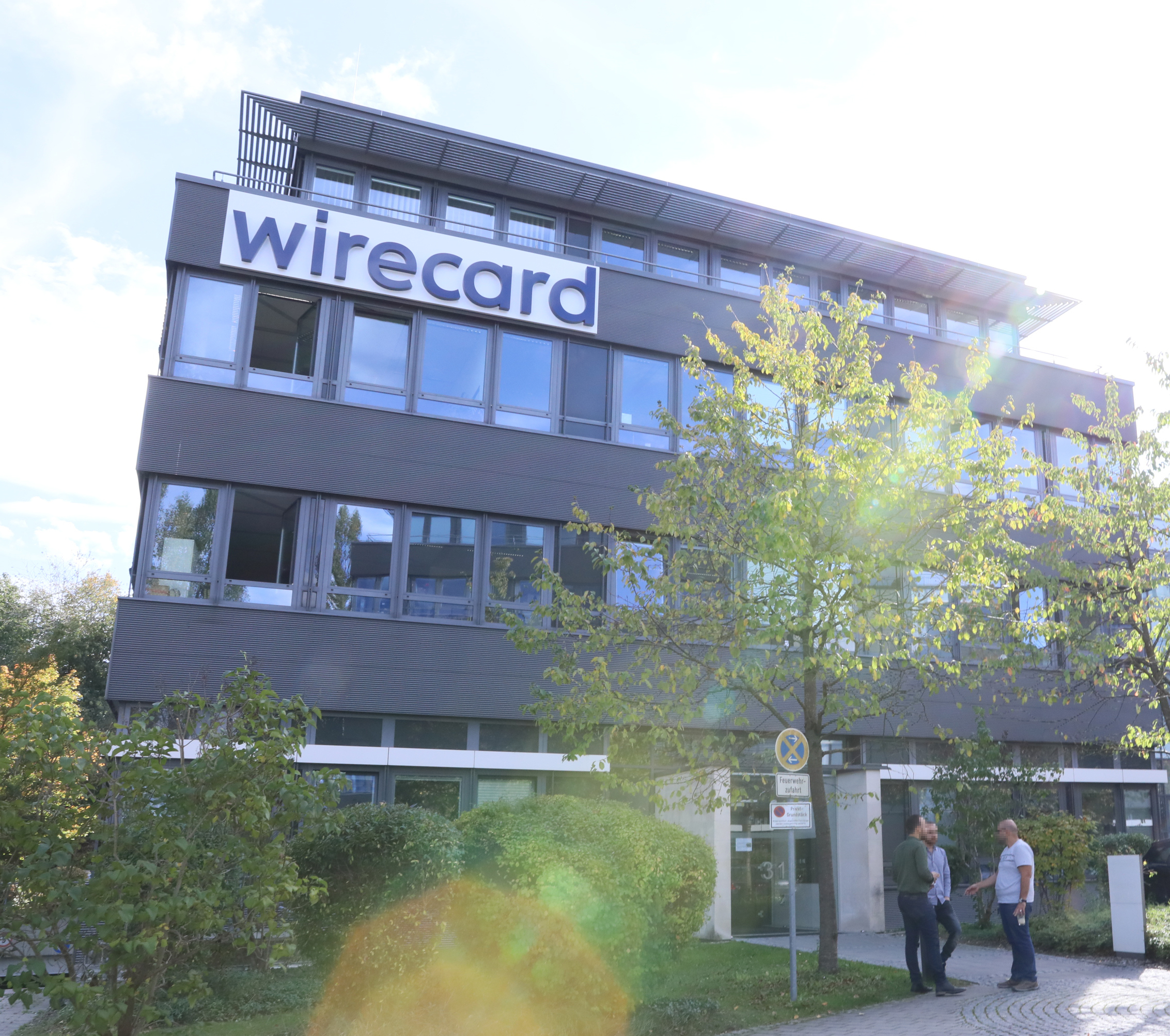
Wirecard's headquarters, raided on 1 July 2020 by German authorities

The Wirecard scandal (German: Wirecard-Skandal) was a series of corrupt business practices and fraudulent financial reporting that led to the insolvency of Wirecard, a payment processor and financial services provider, headquartered in Munich, Germany together with the failure of watchdogs over a number of years. The company was part of the DAX index. They offered customers electronic payment transaction and risk management services, as well as the issuance and processing of physical cards. The subsidiary, Wirecard Bank AG, held a banking licence and had contracts with multiple international financial services companies.

Allegations of accounting malpractices had trailed the company since the early days of its incorporation, reaching a peak in 2019 after the Financial Times published a series of investigations along with whistleblower complaints and internal documents. On 25 June 2020, Wirecard filed for insolvency after revealing that €1.9 billion was "missing", and the termination and arrest of its CEO Markus Braun. Questions have been raised about regulatory failure on the part of Federal Financial Supervisory Authority (BaFin), Germany's top financial watchdog, and possible malpractice of Wirecard's long time auditor Ernst & Young.

== Rise of Wirecard ==
The company was founded in 1999. After Markus Braun joined as CEO in 2002, the company focused on online payment services, starting with porn and gambling websites as clients. By taking over the listing of InfoGenie AG, a defunct call centre group, Wirecard entered the Neuer Markt stock market segment, an action that has been criticised as avoidance of proper scrutiny during an initial public offering (IPO). This was achieved through a decision in an InfoGenie general meeting to transfer the non-listed Wirecard to InfoGenie AG by way of a capital increase against investment in kind, making Wirecard a stock corporation listed in the Prime Standard stock market segment through a reverse IPO. A clean audit from EY in 2007 allayed investors concerns. Wirecard was included in the TecDAX since 2006 and in the DAX since 2018. In 2018, Wirecard shares reached a peak, valuing the company at €24bn.

Wirecard attributed its fast growth to fast international expansion achieved through acquisition of local businesses, resulting in its revenue growth often outpacing general industry trends. In March 2017, Wirecard acquired Citi Prepaid Card Services and created Wirecard North America, entering the US market. Also in 2007, Wirecard expanded into banking by purchasing XCOM Bank AG, allowing it to issue credit and debit cards through licensing agreements with both Visa and Mastercard. In November 2019, Wirecard entered the Chinese market by acquiring Beijing-based AllScore Payment Services.

== Causes of downfall ==
Wirecard is suspected to have engaged in a series of fraudulent accounting activities to inflate its profit. Despite the allegations, BaFin ultimately took little action against the company before its eventual collapse, opting instead to file complaints against critics of the company and short sellers of the company's stock.

=== Accounting irregularities ===
Wirecard's combined banking (through its subsidiary Wirecard Bank) and non-banking (mainly payment processing) operations make its financial results harder to compare with peers, so investors had to rely on adjusted versions of the financial statements of the company. The "adjusted" accounts, unlike the reporting adhering to International Financial Reporting Standards, resulted in inflated earnings and cash flow figures.

Red flags were raised as early as 2008 when the head of a German shareholder association attacked Wirecard's balance sheet irregularities. After EY conducted a special audit in response to the criticisms, it took over as the main auditor for Wirecard and would remain so for the rest of the company's history. As a response, German authorities prosecuted two persons due to insufficient disclosure of holding Wirecard's stock.

In 2015, the Financial Times reported what it saw as a significant gap between the short-term assets and liabilities in Wirecard's payment business. This was a result of Wirecard's taking only a small commission from its payment processing volume, and the transient payment flow through Wirecard's accounts was adjusted to reflect Wirecard's small cut. In response, Wirecard retained the services of Schillings, a UK law firm, and FTI Consulting's public relations agency in London. Later in 2015, J Capital Research published a report that recommended shorting Wirecard's stock, as it saw the company's Asian operations to be much smaller than claimed. In 2016, a critical report published by a previously unknown entity named Zatarra Research led to share price crashes, prompting BaFin to launch an investigation into possible market manipulation.

In July 2021, Wirecard hired corporate investigations firm Alix Partners to perform a forensic investigation of the accounting practices that led to its insolvency.

=== Opaque acquisitions and corporate structure ===
Critics point to Wirecard's global acquisitions as a means to mask trouble with organic growth by adding revenues from external sources, a tactic referred to as a rollup. Early criticisms were directed towards Wirecard's purchases of smaller businesses at significantly above market value. In 2015, Wirecard purchased an Indian payments group for €340m, despite the founders of those businesses failing to raise funding while valuing their key assets at €46m. Wirecard responded to the reports by claiming that its payment technologies were superior and arguing that the rapid growth of the cashless fintech industry justified such valuations. A series of deals involving Wirecard's “buy and build” strategy, which intended to buy customers for the company's payment services, were criticized as being structured in an unusual manner, resulting in difficulty in verifying €670m of intangible assets.

In 2018, the Southern Investigative Reporting Foundation (now the Foundation for Financial Journalism) concluded after a seven-month investigation that according to documents filed, at least €175m from Wirecard's €340m purchase of an India-based payment processor in October 2015 were not transferred to the seller.

=== Artificial inflation of profit ===
In January 2019, Financial Times reported on irregularities uncovered by Wirecard's Singapore investigation, which began in March 2018 internally but a whistleblower feared was being squashed. Edo Kurniawan, head of accounting for Wirecard's Asian-Pacific operations, was accused of creating forged and backdated contracts in order to artificially inflate profit, creating questions about the reliability of Wirecard's accounts. In one instance, €37m was moved between Wirecard subsidiaries and external businesses, in a practice known as round-tripping. A preliminary report commissioned by Rajah & Tann and seen by FT pointed to several years of book-padding across Wirecard's Asian operations, with some degree of knowledge by Wirecard's Munich operation teams.

Despite the report, no actions were taken against key personnel named in the report. Singaporean authorities raided Wirecard as part of an ongoing investigation in February 2019. BaFin banned short selling of Wirecard's stock for two months citing falling investor confidence.

=== Third-party acquirers ===
Third-party acquirers are local companies who processed client transactions on behalf of Wirecard in exchange for a portion of the processing fees. According to Wirecard, they are used in transactions where Wirecard does not hold the necessary license, or when the nature of the transaction is unsuitable for direct processing on the part of Wirecard. In practice, this worked as follows: if a dubious dealer wanted to use Wirecard, for example an online shop, for ineffective hair restorers, then that was interesting for Wirecard, because such a customer pays high fees. However, Wirecard did not want to run such a shop as a Wirecard customer in its own database. So they referred such merchants to third-party acquirers who made sure the problem merchant could process payments.

According to internal whistleblowers, as of 2018, transactions originating from third-party acquirers accounted for half of global transaction volumes reported by Wirecard. Due to Wirecard's singular approach to counting its cash reserves, the cash held in trustee accounts of its third-party acquirers was counted in Wirecard's balance sheets. In 2019, it was reported that half of Wirecard's worldwide revenue and almost all of its profit were processed through three opaque and poorly audited third-party processors.

Wirecard announced lawsuits against the Singaporean authorities and the Financial Times in response to the allegations.

=== Aggressive attack on critics ===
Wirecard had a pattern of unusually aggressive tactics towards those who raised questions about the company's business operations or accounting. In 2019, the company hired former head of Libyan foreign intelligence Rami El Obeidi to conduct sting operations against journalists and public short sellers. El Obeidi presented evidence that the Financial Times colluded with short sellers, which the newspaper rejected after an investigation by an external law firm. And while prosecutors did not name his clients directly, the convicted felon Aviram Azari, a private detective caught in hacking-for-hire schemes, had targeted companies critical of Wirecard.

=== Auditing and regulatory failure ===
BaFin conducted multiple investigations against journalists and short sellers because of alleged market manipulation, in response to negative media reporting about Wirecard. BaFin lacked the authority to investigate Wirecard's core business or its accounting practices, and in fact, only had authority over Wirecard's bank business subsidiary.

As revealed by KPMG's special audit, Wirecard's long time auditor EY failed to verify the existence of cash reserves in what appeared to be fraudulent bank statements. KPMG was unable to verify the majority of Wirecard profits from 2016 to 2018 as part of its audit due to a lack of cooperation from Wirecard and its partners. During the special audit, Wirecard made misleading statements to investors, resulting in a criminal investigation after a complaint was referred to prosecutors by BaFin.

=== Role of sell side analysts ===
Sell side analysts were almost universally positive about Wirecard until as late as February 2020. Analysts at Goldman Sachs had a "Conviction Buy" rating until as late as September 2019. Commerzbank analysts who were positive on the shares even dubbed FT articles questioning the company "fake news". Analysts at Bank of America Merrill Lynch were among the very few skeptics. In 2018, they questioned Wirecard's poor positioning within the German e-commerce payments market and raised concerns related to financial controls.

=== Whistleblower ===
On 20 May 2021, Pav Gill, Wirecard's senior legal counsel based in Singapore who looked after all legal aspects of Wirecard's business and operations in the Asia-Pacific region, revealed himself to be the whistleblower who provided documents exposing the fraud to the Financial Times.

== Aftermath ==
=== Convictions ===
During June 2023, Singapore's State Court sentenced James Wardhana, Wirecard's international finance manager to 21 months and Chai Ai Lim, Wirecard Asia's Head of Finance, to 10 months of imprisonment.

In November 2023, the United States District Court for the Southern District of New York sentenced Aviram Azari, the founder of an Israeli intelligence firm, to 80 months of imprisonment and 3 years of supervised release, as well as the forfeiture of the proceeds from his hacking activities.

=== Investors ===
With respect to criticisms against Wirecard, a set of smaller investors has long been supportive of the company by joining in both the company's and regulator's accusations against short sellers and market manipulation. Critics cite the German regulator, press and investor community's tendency to rally around Wirecard against what they perceive as unfair attack. Softbank invested in Wirecard with a €900m cash injection in 2019. After the company's failure was made public, Softbank's executives blamed what they saw as failures on the auditor's part and announced plans to sue EY for damages, joining other efforts to launch legal actions against the auditor.

=== Regulators ===
After initially defending BaFin's actions, its president Felix Hufeld later admitted the Wirecard scandal was a "complete disaster". In response, the European Commission called for an investigation into whether BaFin broke EU rules on financial reporting. Berlin announced plans to strengthen accounting regulations, beginning by severing ties with the Financial Reporting Enforcement Panel (FREP), a quasi-official accounting watchdog, and transferring its duties to BaFin. FT noted that FREP only had 15 employees and an annual budget of €6m. FREP was thought to be too under-resourced to adequately audit Wirecard, and only concluded that the published accounts were inadequate after the company became insolvent. Investors joined calls for union-wide regulation of market rules and for an EU body in charge of regulatory actions.

On 1 September 2020, the German parliament announced that it would organise an inquiry in order to fully investigate the reasons why the government failed to prevent corporate fraud. The scandal has highlighted the close ties between German politicians and Wirecard. On 29 January 2021, Hufeld and deputy Elisabeth Roegele left BaFin as part of a plan to reform the agency.

=== Suspects ===
Former Wirecard CEO Markus Braun was arrested shortly after his resignation. Former COO Jan Marsalek disappeared shortly after he was fired from the company and was later found to have fled to Belarus. He is a fugitive wanted by the German police, he is listed on Europol's list of Europe's most wanted fugitives, and Interpol issued a Red Notice against him. Christopher Bauer, the company's former Asia manager and son of Paul Bauer-Schlichtegroll, former chairman of the advisory board, died in Manila, Philippines. Bauer was very close to Marsalek.

In 2020, the FinCEN Files showed that Aktif Bank helped launder money for Wirecard.

In January 2026, a Singaporean court sentenced R Shanmugaratnam and James Henry O’Sullivan to 10 and 6.5 years in prison respectively for falsification of accounts related to Wirecard. Shanmugaratnam ran Citadelle Corporate Services in Singapore and issued false confirmation letters for O’Sullivan, claiming that Citadelle held €1.1 billion for Wirecard in various accounts.

=== Money Men book ===
In June 2022, Financial Times investigative reporter Dan McCrum released a book, Money Men: A Hot Startup, A Billion Dollar Fraud, A Fight for the Truth, based on his and his colleagues’ investigation into the scandal. The Economist called it “required reading for investors and financial regulators.”

=== Skandal! documentary ===
In 2022, Netflix released Skandal! Bringing Down Wirecard, a documentary that consists of "the lying, the spying, the dirty tricks" and how through it all, Financial Times journalists and KPMG uncovered the truth behind Wirecard's fraudulent financial reporting.

== See also ==
- 1992 Indian stock market scam
- NSE co-location scam
- Satyam scandal
