= Gerald Loeb Award winners for Investigative =

American journalism award

The Gerald Loeb Award is given annually for multiple categories of business reporting. The "Investigative" category was first awarded in 2013.

== Gerald Loeb Award for Investigative (2013–2022) ==
- 2013: "Wal-Mart Abroad" by David Barstow, Alejandra Xanic von Bertrab and Stephanie Clifford, The New York Times

Articles in Series
1. "Vast Mexico Bribery Case Hushed Up by Wal-Mart After Top-Level Struggle", April 22, 2012
2. "Turmooil at Wal-Mart: The Players", April 22, 2012
3. "Wal-Mart Takes A Broader Look at Bribery Cases", November 16, 2012
4. "The Bribery Aisle: How Wal-Mart Used Payoffs To Get Its Way in Mexico", December 18, 2012

- 2014: "Breathless and Burdened: Dying from Black Lung, Buried by Law and Medicine" by Chris Hamby, Brian Ross, Matthew Mosk, Rhonda Schwartz, Chris Zubak-Skees, Ronnie Greene, and Jim Morris, The Center for Public Integrity in partnership with ABC News

Articles in Series:
1. "Coal industry's go-to law firm withheld evidence of black lung, at expense of sick miners", October 29, 2013
2. "Johns Hopkins medical unit rarely finds black lung, helping coal industry defeat miners' claims", October 30, 2013
3. "As experts recognize new form of black lung, coal industry follows familiar pattern of denial", November 1, 2013

- 2015: “Medicare Unmasked” by Christopher S. Stewart, Christopher Weaver, John Carreyrou, Rob Barry, Anna Wilde Mathews and Tom McGinty, The Wall Street Journal
- 2016: “Seafood from Slaves” by Margie Mason, Martha Mendoza, Robin McDowell and Esther Htusan, Associated Press
- 2017 (tie): “Dangerous Doses” by Sam Roe, Karisa King and Ray Long, Chicago Tribune

Articles in Series:
1. "Big data offers new way to find hidden drug interactions", February 11, 2016
2. "Mix of medications leaves woman fighting for life", February 11, 2016
3. "Pharmacies miss half of dangerous drug combinations", December 1, 2016

- 2017 (tie): "Allegiant Air" by William R. Levesque, Nathaniel Lash and Anthony Cormier, Tampa Bay Times
- 2018: "Culture of Harassment" by Emily Steel, Michael S. Schmidt, Jodi Kantor, Megan Twohey, Susan Chira, and Catrin Einhorn, The New York Times
- 2019: "Facebook, Disinformation and Privacy" by Nicholas Confessore, Matthew Rosenberg, Carole Cadwalladr, Sheera Frenkel, Cecilia Kang, Paul Mozur, Jack Nicas, Gabriel J.X. Dance, Michael LaForgia and Brian X. Chen, The New York Times
- 2020: "Exploited", Michael H. Keller, Gabriel J.X. Dance, Nellie Bowles, The New York Times

Articles in Series:
1. "The Internet Is Overrun With Images of Child Sexual Abuse. What Went Wrong?", September 29, 2019
2. "Child Abusers Run Rampant as Tech Companies Look the Other Way", November 9, 2019
3. "Video Games and Online Chats Are 'Hunting Grounds' for Sexual Predators", December 7, 2019
4. "Fighting the Good Fight Against Online Child Sexual Abuse", December 23, 2019

- 2021 (tie): "Addicted to Profit" by Cam Simpson, Michael Smith, and Nacha Cattan, Bloomberg News

Article:

"Heroin's Hidden Ingredient Is a Chemical Made by U.S. Companies", August 26, 2020

- 2021 (tie): "Inside Wirecard" by Dan McCrum, Olaf Storbeck, Sam Jones, Paul Murphy, Helen Warrell, Henry Foy, Max Seddon, Andrew England, and Erika Solomon, The Financial Times
- 2022: "Poisoned" by Corey G. Johnson, Rebecca Woolington and Eli Murray, Tampa Bay Times and PBS Frontline

Articles:
1. "Poisoned Part 1: The Factory", March 24, 2021
2. "Poisoned Part 2: The Failings", March 29, 2021
3. "Poisoned Part 3: The Fallout", December 2, 2021

- 2023: "Profit, Pain, and Private Equity" by Kendall Taggart, John Templon, Anthony Cormier, and Jason Leopold, BuzzFeed News
