= Hack-for-hire operation =

Type of hacking

Hack-for-hire operations are services that provide clients with illicit access to information by infiltrating digital systems or networks, typically for a fee. Unlike surveillance companies that supply clients with intrusion software, these vendors typically carry out hacking operations on customers’ behalf. This form of hacking on demand has seen a surge in popularity over recent years, with the trend being attributed to advancements in technology, growing digital connectivity, heightened demand for corporate espionage and personal data breaches, increasingly privatized national security, and weak accountability mechanisms. Victims of these attacks have included governments, journalists, human rights defenders, political opponents, business rivals, lawyers, ordinary Internet users, and more.

== History ==
The concept of hack-for-hire services can be traced back to the early years of the internet, when hackers were contracted for a variety of reasons, such as to perform penetration tests which was considered "ethical hacking" . Over time, however, the scope of these operations expanded to include illegal activities, like industrial espionage, personal data breaches, and illicit political interference.

== Operation ==
Hack-for-hire operations typically involve a client who pays a hacker or a group of hackers to infiltrate a specified digital system or network to gather information. The services offered by these hackers can range from simple password cracking to sophisticated techniques such as phishing, ransomware attacks, or advanced persistent threats (APTs).

Operators employ a variety of marketing techniques, including advertisements and posts on Internet forums and social media platforms. In some cases, firms present themselves as “ethical hackers” as a way to attract clients for their illicit services. Hack-for-hire operations can also utilize the dark web, an encrypted part of the internet that is not indexed by traditional search engines, to advertise their services and connect with potential clients. Transactions are typically made using cryptocurrencies to maintain anonymity.

== Legality ==
Hack-for-hire services are typically considered illegal, as they involve unauthorized access to private digital systems and computer networks. They are generally punishable under the computer crime laws of many countries, including the Computer Fraud and Abuse Act (CFAA) in the United States and the Computer Misuse Act in the United Kingdom.

== Recent developments ==
In 2023, an extensive Reuters investigation revealed a massive scheme of hack-for-hire operations, uncovering several groups operating globally. The investigative report showed the complex and sophisticated nature of such operations, which often involved multiple layers of hackers subcontracting work to maintain anonymity and evade legal repercussions.

The London-based National Cyber Security Centre (NCSC) said in a report published on June 22, 2023 that it was increasingly seeing "hackers-for-hire" brought in "to gain the upper hand in business dealings or legal disputes."

== Notable cases ==
Several high-profile hack-for-hire operations have made headlines in recent years:

1. Operation Aurora (2009): A cyber-attack which began in mid-2009 targeted several high-profile organizations, including Google and Adobe. Later investigations linked the attacks to the Chinese government, suggesting state-sponsored hack-for-hire activity.
2. Appin (2013): An Indian company that began as a cybersecurity training firm but evolved into a hack-for-hire operation targeting executives, politicians, and officials worldwide. Security researchers tracked their extensive hacking campaigns for years across multiple countries.
3. Hacking Team (2015): An Italian cybersecurity firm known for providing hacking services to governments worldwide, Hacking Team itself was hacked in 2015. The breach exposed the company's internal documents and revealed its controversial clients, such as repressive governments. The company was dissolved in 2020.
4. Dark Basin (2020): A group of hack-for-hire operators known as Dark Basin targeted a wide range of industries and individuals worldwide and was uncovered in 2017 by Citizen Lab. The group was found to have links to an Indian IT firm called BellTroX, which was founded by former Appin employees who continued similar operations.

== See also ==
- Cybersecurity
- Cyber espionage
- Advanced Persistent Threat
