= Matthew Rosenberg =

American journalist

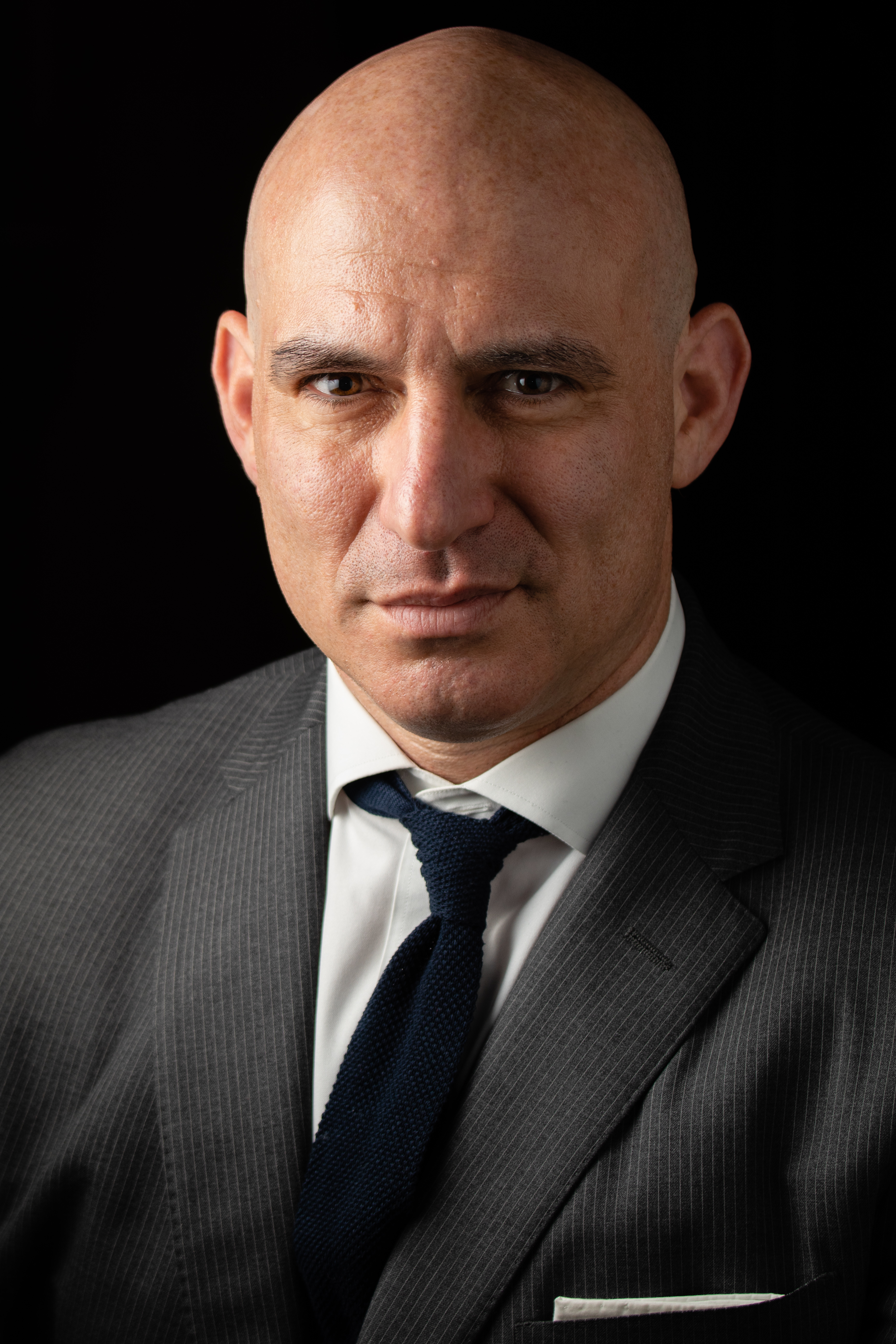
- Matthew Rosenberg at the 2018 Pulitzer Prizes
- Born: August 2, 1974 (age 50)
- Education: McGill University (BA)
- Occupation: Journalist
- Employer: The New York Times

Matthew Rosenberg (born August 2, 1974) is a Pulitzer-Prize winning American journalist. He worked at The New York Times from 2011 to April, 2024. He spent 15 years as a foreign correspondent in Asia, Africa and the Middle East, and was expelled from Afghanistan in August 2014 on the orders of President Hamid Karzai, the first expulsion of a Western journalist from Afghanistan since the Taliban ruled the country.

== Early life ==
Rosenberg was born in New York City. He holds a bachelor's degree from McGill University in Montreal, Quebec, Canada.

== Career ==
Rosenberg began his reporting career at The Associated Press, and served as a foreign correspondent for the news agency in South Asia, the Middle East, East Africa and the Caribbean.

=== Awards ===
Rosenberg was part of a team of New York Times reporters who won a Pulitzer Prize for national reporting in 2018 for reporting on Donald Trump's advisers and their connections to Russia. He also won two George Polk Awards, and was a finalist for the Pulitzer Prize in international reporting in 2016.

He received the 2019 Gerald Leb Award for Investigative reporting for his contributions to the series "Facebook, Disinformation and Privacy".

=== Expulsion and espionage accusations ===
On November 5, 2009, The Nation (Pakistan) newspaper in Pakistan printed a front-page story that accused Rosenberg of being a spy. The story claimed that Rosenberg worked for the CIA and the U.S. security contractor formerly known as Blackwater. It also alleged he had ties to Israeli intelligence. The Wall Street Journal Managing Editor Robert Thomson wrote to the editor of The Nation, Shireen Mazari, to protest the story soon after the article was published. The Wall Street Journal's Daniel Pearl, kidnapped and killed in 2002 in Pakistan, had been labeled a Jewish spy similarly by some members of the Pakistani media before his death. Twenty-one editors from the world's major international news organizations also signed a letter of protest, calling the article's accusation "unsubstantiated" and criticizing it for compromising Rosenberg's security.

In August 2014, Rosenberg was barred from leaving Afghanistan and interrogated by the country's attorney general after writing a story about how senior Afghan security officials were considering whether to stage what would, in essence, amount to a coup because of a mounting political crisis. The following day, the travel ban was abruptly reversed, and Rosenberg was ordered to leave Afghanistan within 24 hours. He departed Afghanistan on August 21 in compliance with the government order. Defending the decision to order out Rosenberg, a government statement called his story "an act of espionage," and Aimal Faizi, a spokesman for President Karzai, said the expulsion had been ordered at "the highest levels."

=== Project Veritas video ===
On March 9, 2022, Project Veritas released an undercover video showing Rosenberg talking about his colleagues exaggerating the events of the January 6, 2021 Capitol attack. In the video, Rosenberg said, "These fucking little dweebs who keep going on about their trauma … Shut the fuck up. They’re fucking bitches." He also said of the political left, "They were making it too big a deal" and "They were making this some organized thing that it wasn't."

During a March 11, 2022 meeting, New York Times executive editor Dean Baquet address the Rosenberg sting operation and the resulting tensions among Times staff. Baquet reportedly criticized Rosenberg for being careless and stupid and said Project Veritas was attempting to, "make our heads explode" by dividing the reporters.

== Personal life ==
Rosenberg is based in Washington, DC.
