= MiMedx =

American Biomedical company

- Company type: Public company
- Traded as: Nasdaq: MDXG
- Industry: Biomedical
- Founded: 2008; 18 years ago
- Founder: Parker H. Petit
- Headquarters: Marietta, Georgia, United States
- Area served: Worldwide
- Key people: Tim Wright (CEO)
- Products: Skin grafts, allografts
- Number of employees: 710 (2020)
- Website: www.mimedx.com

MiMedx is an American biomedical company based in Marietta, Georgia, founded in 2008. Using tissues from birth such as the placenta, amniotic sac, and umbilical cord, MiMedx creates skin for skin grafts for medical use.

During 2016-2019, the company went through a period of financial difficulty after allegations of mismanagement which resulted in Petit being terminated in 2018. With the arrival of Wright as CEO in May 2019, the company worked with auditors and regulators to resolve legal and financial issues created by the previous management (see ‘History’). Wright also began a cultural and financial turnaround, assembling a new senior management team by August 2019 to instill “transparency, truthfulness, and timeliness” in communications and business dealings.

By August 2020, MiMedx had raised $150 million in concurrent private equity and debt financings; completed a required financial restatement; and filed its 2019 annual report and 2020 first-quarter report. MiMedx's application to relist its common stock on the NASDAQ was approved on October 30, 2020. The company had been delisted from the NASDAQ in November 2018 and had traded on OTC Pink until relisting.

As of November 2020, MiMedx had supplied more than two million allografts for skin grafts to address persistent wounds such as diabetic foot ulcers that often result in amputation, burns, and other urgent health issues.

== History ==
=== Foundation and early years ===
In 2008, Parker H. Petit, who formed Life Systems in the 1970s, founded MiMedx and became CEO in 2009. Life Systems went public as Healthdyne Inc. in 1981. Healthdyne split into multiple companies, one of which became Matria Healthcare and Petit was named CEO in 2000. He retired from Matria in 2008 when it was acquired by Alere.

MiMedx joined the NASDAQ exchange in April 2012 as MDXG. The company's 2012 revenue was around $27 million and MiMedx was named one of Fortune's fastest-growing companies in 2017. MXDG was delisted in November 2018 after fraud and other impropriety and began trading on OTC Pink. Motley Fool said "delisting might be the least of the company's problems." After several fraud scandals, Petit was terminated from MiMedx in June 2018.

=== FDA investigations 2013-2016 ===
In 2013, the FDA investigated MiMedx's amniotic products to determine if they were Section 361 eligible. If not, they would need to meet the more stringent requirements of a pharmaceutical. In August 2013, the FDA stated the products weren't Section 361 eligible, making them unlawful for sale until meeting more stringent standards. Petit suspected a rival, Organogenesis, had lobbied for this.

Also in 2013, the U.S. Department of Veterans Affairs reclassified allografts from MiMedx and stopped purchasing from the company. Parker Petit suspected that Organogenesis lobbied for this reclassification and the VA reversed the policy change a week later. However, after this reclassification, according to Bloomberg, Georgia Senator Johnny Isakson made at least eight calls on behalf of MiMedx and Petit to the VA, the FDA and the FBI. Although the federal agencies provided some relief to MiMedx, there was no evidence that Isakson influenced the relief.

In December 2014, MiMedx sued Organogenesis for interfering in its VA business, but withdrew the suit a month later.

In 2016, a VA rule change on the storage of medical products meant MiMedx would have to take product back, causing a revenue drop since the sales were already booked. Petit reported to MiMedx executives that this wouldn't happen, as they had been talking to the VA and were "having our senator make some phone calls", referring to Isakson. The VA rule change was reinterpreted, causing lower impact to the company than previously expected.

=== Financial issues 2017-2019 ===
Beginning in 2017, investors and short-sellers such as Marc Cohodes started publicizing fraud, accusing the company of channel stuffing. John Fichthorn of Dialectic Capital said the company was in a "revenue fraud situation". Petit blasted the "'wolf pack' of short sellers with making 'fraudulent and unethical accusations' .. [taking] short selling into a fraudulent and also illegal mode", filing a lawsuit against three blogs run by Dialectic, Sparrow Fund Management, and Viceroy Research, all short sellers. Other investors investigating the company at the time included Aurelius Value and Citron Research. Cohodes accused Petit of defamation, and wrote a series of threatening tweets toward Petit. Following this, Sen. Isakson reached out to the Atlanta FBI on Petit's behalf, and the FBI arrived at Cohodes's doorstep in response. MiMedx's website contained a section rebutting the short sellers. In March 2017 the company announced that a yearlong internal audit didn't uncover any wrongdoing. In August 2017 the company fired their outside auditor, Cherry Bekaert LLP and hired Ernst & Young.

The accounting fraud allegations led to a SEC investigation in September 2017, a Justice Department investigation in 2018, and subpoenas from the VA Department. Petit (CEO), William Taylor (COO), and Michael Senken (CFO) resigned in June 2018, but MiMedx stated the three had not resigned but were terminated for cause. The SEC opened a lawsuit, naming Petit and Senken. Three VA employees were indicted in May 2018 for accepting bribes from the company.

The company delayed its earnings announcement in February 2018 and stated it wasn't aware of any Justice Department investigations. A week later the Justice Department investigation was made public.

In 2018, the Wall Street Journal reported that the company considered the 2013 Physician Payments Sunshine Act not applicable to their business as they were part of FDA Section 361. Competitors reported payments through the act. WSJ found at least 20 physicians who received payments that would normally be reported. MiMedx's website stated they had "received an opinion from HHS's CMS department which confirms that MiMedx does not have a need to report", though CMS stated they do not provide such opinions.

By August 2018, Petit listed had his $15 million mansion in the Florida panhandle for sale. New York Post called him "the Trump of Georgia". Petit is a top Republican fundraiser in Georgia, as well as being the finance chair for Trump's 2016 campaign.

=== Turn around 2019-2020 ===
In May 2019, Timothy Wright had been named as CEO, replacing David Coles. By August 2019, 13 of 16 executives were no longer with MiMedx. The company stated that Petit, Taylor, Senken, and former Controller John Cranston had ordered the installation of a secret video surveillance system to expose and undermine whistleblowers, called Project Snow White. They also stated the four had "repeatedly misled or withheld information" from auditors, including Petit in a sworn deposition and Senken in a letter to the SEC. They stated Petit and Taylor "purposely took action to disregard revenue-recognition rules".

In November 2019, MiMedx settled a SEC lawsuit for "wide-ranging fraud" to inflate revenue in quarterly and annual filings, paying $1.5 million. The company hired auditors from Ernst & Young and said they would restate earnings back to 2012 and that they would be delisted. The auditors resigned from the MiMedx audit in December 2018, which is "never a good sign" according to Bloomberg, also stating that Cohodes had gone too far in his attacks.

On the same day, indictments were unsealed by SDNY's Geoffrey Berman, charging Petit and Taylor with securities fraud over "materially inflated revenue in the second, third, and fourth quarters of 2015, and for the full year 2015", inflating annual revenue by $9.5 million. Bloomberg stated a dozen "current and former executives and employees of his companies describe a hard-charging leader -- one who didn’t dwell on the rules as he pursued revenue growth". In November 2020, after a four week long jury trial, Petit was found guilty on commission of securities fraud, and not guilty on conspiracy to commit securities fraud. Taylor, on the other hand, received the opposite outcome; he was found guilty on the conspiracy charge, but not guilty on the commission charge. They were both sentenced to one year in prison and Petit was ordered to pay a $1,000,000 fine, while Taylor only had to pay a $250,000 fine.

On April 6, 2020, MiMedx settled a Department of Justice lawsuit regarding MiMedx charging inflated prices to the VA Department. MiMedx agreed to pay $6.5 million to settle the suit, which was uncovered through whistleblowers.

On April 21, 2020, MiMedx announced they had received $10 million in federally backed small business loans, the maximum allowable amount, as part of the Paycheck Protection Program. The company received scrutiny over this loan, which was aimed at small businesses suffering from the COVID-19 pandemic. The New York Times noted that this payment was given to a company that has had "serious scrapes" with the government, while a company spokesperson stated MiMedx needed the loan since the problems have caused other funding channels to be closed to them.

=== Growth 2020-Present ===
By April 2020, the company had approximately 710 employees.
