= Pockit =

British financial technology company

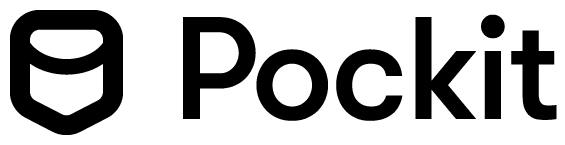
- Company type: Private company
- Industry: Internet
- Founded: 2014; 11 years ago
- Founder: Virraj Jatania
- Headquarters: London, United Kingdom
- Key people: CEO - Virraj Jatania.
- Products: Pockit app
- Website: pockit.com

Pockit is a British financial technology company offering pre-paid spending cards, current accounts, and a range of other pseudo-bank financial services. The mobile-first service aimed to make money simple for low-income 'unbanked' customers, with products and services tailored specifically for them.

Since its foundation, the company has 500,000 customers.

== History ==
Pockit was founded in 2014 by Virraj Jatania to provide a better banking product to financially underserved customers and tackle issues around financial inclusion in the UK. Their digital current account supported online payments, direct debits and had built in tools to help people take control of their spending.

In 2018, Pockit introduced a feature to help customers build their credit score, provided in partnership with LOQBOX. There are an estimated ten million people who have previously been neglected or excluded by traditional high street banks that Pockit aims to serve better, regardless of their income or credit history.

In 2019 Pockit published its ‘Banking Poverty Premium’ report which revealed how people without access to a bank account pay up to £485 extra each year because they miss out on preferential discounts on everyday bills and basic services such as utility bills, mobile phone contracts, broadband and personal loans.

At the end of June 2020, some accounts became inaccessible due to the FCA suspending Wirecard's ability to move money. The restrictions were lifted on 29 June and operations returned to normal.

In November 2020 Pockit obtained a further round of speculative funding and crowdsourced investment.

== Awards ==
In 2018, Pockit won The Spectator Economic Disrupter of the year award.
