= Wirecard =

Insolvent German financial services company

Wirecard AG
- Type: Aktiengesellschaft
- Industry: Financial services Payment processor Technology
- Genre: Financial
- Predecessor: InfoGenie AG (until 6 April 2005)
- Founded: 1 January 1999; 27 years ago
- Defunct: June 2020
- Fate: Insolvent after accounting scandal
- Headquarters: Aschheim, Upper Bavaria, Bavaria, Germany
- Area served: Worldwide
- Key people: Thomas Eichelmann (chairman of the supervisory board)
- Products: Electronic payment processing Banking; Card issuance Mobile payment Risk management
- Revenue: ▲€2.02 billion (under question) (US$2.31 billion) (2018)
- Net income: ▲€347.4 million (under question) (US$397.7 million) (2018)
- Total assets: ▲€5.855 billion (under question) (US$6.697 billion) (2018)
- Number of employees: 5,300 (Jun 2019)
- Website: www.wirecard.com

Wirecard AG is an insolvent German payment processor and financial services provider whose former CEO, COO, two board members, and other executives have been arrested or otherwise implicated in criminal proceedings. The company offered electronic payment transaction services and risk management, and issued and processed physical and virtual cards. As of 2017, the company was listed on the Frankfurt Stock Exchange, and was a part of the DAX stock index from September 2018 to August 2020.

The company is at the center of an international financial scandal. Allegations of accounting malpractices had trailed the company since the early days of its incorporation, reaching a peak in 2019 after the Financial Times published a series of investigations along with whistleblower complaints and internal documents. On 25 June 2020, Wirecard filed for insolvency following revelations that an amount of €1.9 billion was "missing". Long-time CEO Markus Braun subsequently resigned and was later arrested. Former COO Jan Marsalek disappeared, after being fired from his position and board seat, and remains a fugitive wanted by the German police. He has been on Europe's Most Wanted list since 2020.

In June 2020, the company announced that €1.9 billion in cash was missing. It owed €3.2 billion in debt. In November 2020, the company was dismantled after it sold the assets of its main business unit to Santander Group for €100 million. Other assets, including its North American, UK and Brazilian units had been previously sold at nondisclosed prices. On 25 August 2020, the court-appointed insolvency administrator issued a statement that "under the preliminary insolvency administration, it has since been possible to stabilize the ongoing business and create a basis for its continuation." The statement mentioned how "far-reaching cuts are therefore necessary in order to make any kind of continuation possible" and announced the impending layoff of around 730 employees, in addition to all members of the management board.

In March 2022, Munich public prosecutors charged former CEO, Markus Braun, with fraud, breach of trust and accounting manipulation. If found guilty on all these charges, he could face up to 15 years in prison. Braun was held in the Stadelheim prison as a pre-trial custody until the trial began.

== History ==
=== Founding and early business model ===
Wirecard was founded in 1999 and took care of the technical processing of credit card payments for online vendors. According to Der Spiegel, its clientele initially "consisted primarily of porno and gambling sites". In 2002, when it was close to folding at the end of the dot-com bubble, Markus Braun injected capital and joined as CEO. He consolidated the company and focused the business model on providing internet payment services, initially mainly to porn and gambling websites.

=== Stock listing and relation to InfoGenie AG ===
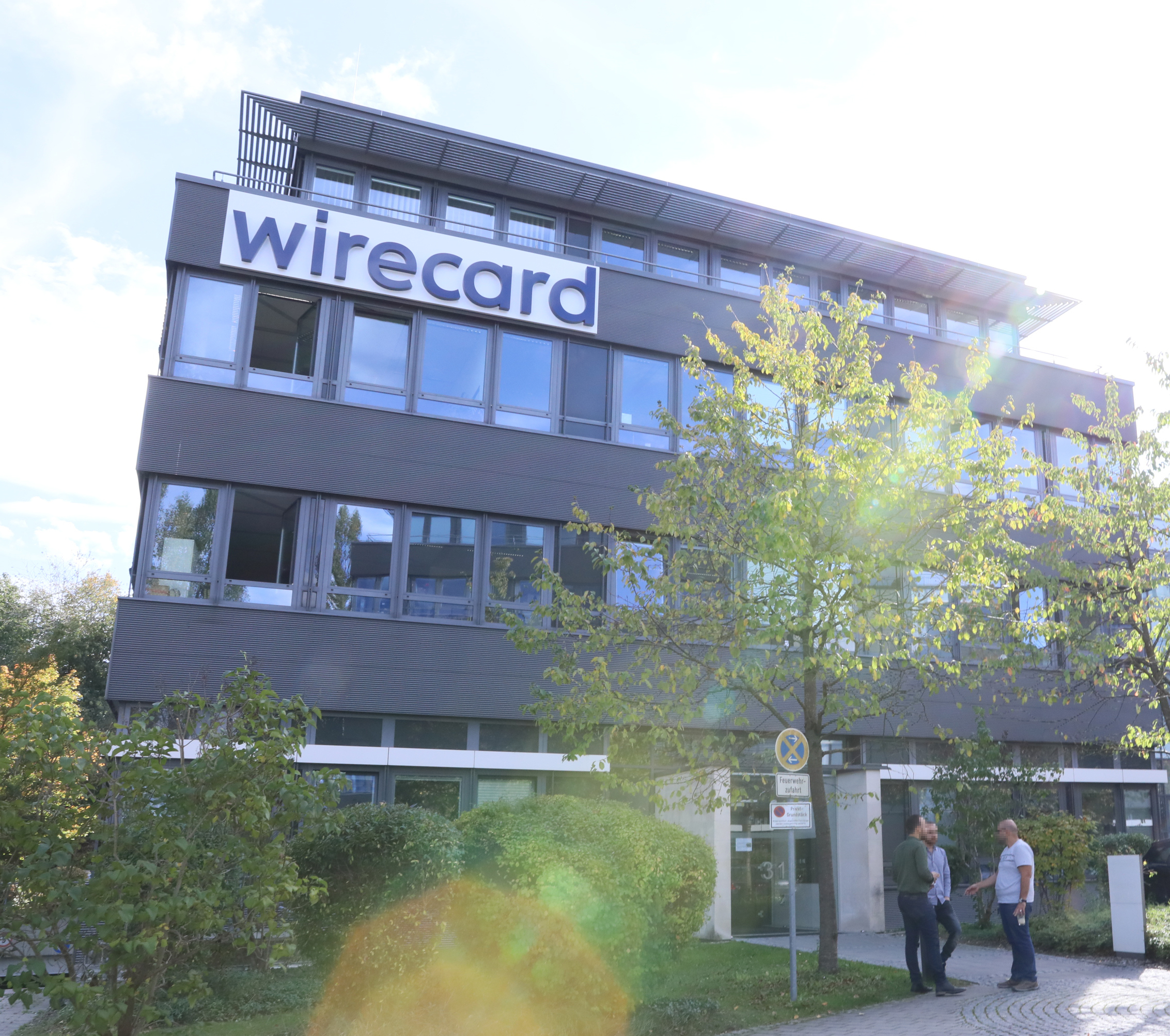
Headquarters of Wirecard AG in Aschheim (near Munich), 2019

Wirecard became a public stock corporation (listed in the Prime Standard stock market segment) through a reverse IPO, merging with a struggling existing public corporation, InfoGenie AG. Based in Berlin, InfoGenie shares had been listed in the Neuer Markt stock market segment since October 2000 as an information service provider offering telephone advice hotlines on various topics. When the shares became penny stocks following price losses, the stock exchange operator Deutsche Börse wanted to exclude InfoGenie from the Neuer Markt, but this was disallowed by a court in April 2002. In mid-December 2004, InfoGenie decided to merge with the non-listed Wirecard by way of a capital increase against investment in kind, and to change its name to Wire Card. This proceeded on 1 January 2005, and Wire Card became a public corporation. In 2006, Wirecard was included in the TecDAX and in September 2018 in the DAX.

=== International expansion ===
Wirecard Asia Pacific was founded in Singapore in 2007. In 2008, Wirecard introduced virtual prepaid credit cards for online payments and in the following year a fraud prevention suite for fraud detection. In 2014, Wirecard expanded to New Zealand, Australia, South Africa and Turkey. With the purchase of Prepaid Card Services from Citigroup, Wirecard also began to be represented in the United States in 2016. In the same year, the company acquired a South American Internet payment service provider in Brazil. In 2019, SoftBank invested in Wirecard. With the acquisition of AllScore Payment Services from Beijing, Wirecard also began to be represented in China as of November 2019.

== Scandal and insolvency ==
Beginning in April 2015, the Financial Times blog FT Alphaville wrote a series of blog posts that questioned Wirecard's business model and criticised the company's accounting practices.

In February 2016, the 101-page "Zatarra Report" appeared, documenting alleged fraud and money laundering at Wirecard. It was co-written by British short sellers Fraser Perring of Viceroy Research and Matthew Earl of ShadowFall, who sent the report to the German financial agency BaFin. On the urging of Wirecard, BaFin and Bavarian prosecutors then initiated criminal investigations against Perring and other short sellers for market manipulation. The cases were dropped in March 2020. In February 2017, the German Manager Magazin published a lengthy article about Wirecard in which it alleged misleading reporting practices.

On 30 January 2019, Wirecard shares plunged after the Financial Times reported that a senior executive was suspected of "falsification of accounts" and "money laundering" and round-tripping in the company's Asia-Pacific operations. Wirecard issued a statement calling the report "false, inaccurate, misleading and defamatory". Wirecard also announced a lawsuit against the Financial Times for "unethical reporting" and a lawsuit for market manipulation.

The public prosecutor's office Munich I in February 2019 launched criminal investigations against Financial Times journalist Dan McCrum because of alleged violations of the German Securities Trading Act (Wertpapierhandelsgesetz, WpHG). The German Federal Financial Supervisory Authority BaFin banned short selling Wirecard shares on 18 February 2019 until 18 April 2019. According to BaFin, the measure was not meant to take sides in the controversy between Wirecard and the Financial Times. On 15 October 2019, the Financial Times published documents which it claimed to be Wirecard's internal accounting spreadsheets.

In 2019, the accounting firm KPMG was hired by Wirecard for an independent audit to address the mentioned allegations. In March 2020, Wirecard claimed that KPMG concluded that no discrepancy was determined during the audit. However, on 28 April 2020 the auditor KPMG announced that it had not received sufficient documentation to address all allegations of accounting irregularities, with Wirecard shares tumbling 26%. London Based Hedge-Fund TCI and others shortsellers like Armin S. filed criminal complaints against Wirecard. On 5 June, Wirecard's headquarters were searched by police as part of a criminal investigation into potentially misleading statements to investors by CEO Markus Braun and three other board members regarding the audit. The company then reported on 18 June 2020 that €1.9 billion was missing in cash from the company's accounts, this following an audit by Ernst & Young. Braun resigned as CEO the following day, to be replaced by James Freis. Over two days, the company's stock fell 72%. On 22 June 2020, Braun was arrested by German police under accusations of "inflating Wirecard AG's sales volume with fake income". On 11 September 2020, Freis announced in an email that he had stepped down from the CEO position, after 85 days, with immediate effect.

In January 2020, Wirecard announced that a contract extension would be offered to chief executive Markus Braun. At the same time, its long-time chairman stepped aside. In April, an auditor found questionable accounting practices. According to auditing firm Ernst & Young, a trustee of Wirecard tried to "deceive the auditor", resulting in the bank processor being unable to release the share results for 2019. In a statement, Wirecard announced that it was "working intensively together with the auditor towards a clarification of the situation".

In June 2020, it was revealed that €1.9 billion was "missing". As a result, Wirecard's share value decreased by over 72%, and its CEO, Markus Braun, resigned. Wirecard appointed James Freis to the position on an interim basis. Freis had only joined the company the evening before. A few days later, the management board stated that the €1.9 billion amount likely did not exist. Two banks in the Philippines who were allegedly holding the money said that they did not have the sum and never did. The firm's Moodys credit rating was demoted to B3 on 19 June 2020, before this rating was removed entirely 3 days later.

A criminal investigation began on 22 June 2020; Wirecard's recently resigned CEO, Markus Braun, was arrested the same day. On 25 June, Wirecard filed for bankruptcy, citing "over-indebtedness". On 25 August 2020, the firm's administration axed the contracts of its chief executive manager as well as two additional managers. Furthermore, 730 company staff were also cut. In September 2020, the German parliament announced that it would organize an inquiry in order to fully investigate the reasons why the government failed to prevent the corporate fraud.

The UK Financial Conduct Authority froze the activities of Wirecard's British subsidiary, Wirecard Card Solutions Limited, between 26 June 2020 and 30 June 2020, after which Wirecard UK operations were allowed to resume, albeit with restrictions. Singapore's central bank, the Monetary Authority of Singapore (MAS), announced in September 2020 that it has directed Wirecard's Singapore branch to stop their payment services there, and return all funds owed, in light of the company's insolvent business and inability to continue providing payment services in Singapore.

A report published in June 2020 by the interdisciplinary journalism laboratory Citizen Lab at the University of Toronto stated that persons and organisations publicly critical of Wirecard had been the target of sustained hacking and phishing attempts by a hackers-for-hire group dubbed Dark Basin. According to the report, some of the critical entities, which included hedge funds, short sellers, investigators, and journalists, were "targeted almost daily for months, and continued to receive messages for years". The report linked the attacks "with high confidence" to the Indian company BellTroX InfoTech which has a history of other hacking-for-hire operations. U.S. prosecutors in New York and the FBI reportedly started an investigation into the hacker-for-hire allegations. Wirecard denied any wrongdoing.

On 20 May 2021, Pav Gill, Wirecard's senior legal counsel based in Singapore who looked after all legal aspects of Wirecard's business and operations in the Asia-Pacific region, revealed himself to be the whistleblower who provided the material exposing the fraud to the Financial Times.

During June 2023, Singapore's State Court sentenced James Wardhana, Wirecard's international finance manager to 21 months and Chai Ai Lim, Wirecard Asia's Head of Finance, to 10 months of imprisonment.

In January 2026, a Singaporean court sentenced R Shanmugaratnam and James Henry O’Sullivan to 10 and 6.5 years in prison respectively for falsification of accounts related to Wirecard. Shanmugaratnam ran Citadelle Corporate Services in Singapore and issued false confirmation letters for O’Sullivan, claiming that Citadelle held €1.1 billion for Wirecard in various accounts.

The criminal trial of Braun, former chief accountant Stephan von Erffa and Oliver Bellenhaus, the former head of Wirecard's Dubai subsidiary, began in Munich on 8 December 2022. Braun denied the charges, which included commercial gang fraud, breach of trust, accounting fraud and market manipulation, while Bellenhaus admitted wrongdoing and became a key prosecution witness. In a separate civil case in September 2024, a Munich court ordered Braun and two other former executives to pay €140 million in damages, upholding claims by insolvency administrator Michael Jaffé that they had breached their duties by approving loans to a Singaporean company. As of July 2026, the criminal trial had run for more than 270 hearing days without a verdict, and closing arguments were scheduled to begin on 19 October 2026.

== Products and services ==
Wirecard was an international supplier of electronic payment and risk management services. Wirecard offered products and services in the areas of mobile payments, e-commerce, digitisation and finance technology. This comprised the integration of payment methods, payment transactions via e-commerce as well as payment transactions at the stationary checkout (POS). In these areas, Wirecard claimed working in cooperation with 280,000 companies (as of December 2018), including Allianz, KLM, Qatar Airways, Rakuten.com and Transport for London, among others. The transaction volume in 2018 was US$125 billion and in the first half of 2019 the transaction volume grew by 37.5 per cent to EUR 77.3 billion.

=== Mobile payments ===
Starting in 2015, Wirecard offered consumers the fully digitalised, mobile payment-app Boon, which works independently of banks or network operators. Boon is based on a virtual Mastercard and runs on mobile devices with the Android or iOS operating systems. The Android version is currently available in Germany, Austria, Belgium, the Netherlands, Spain and Ireland. In addition, Boon can be used via Apple Pay in France, Great Britain, Switzerland, Spain, Italy, Ireland and Germany. Google Pay supports Boon in France. Boon offers contactless payments via smartphone and tablet through NFC as well as online payments and peer-to-peer transactions.

In the mobile payments sector, Wirecard negotiated several contracts with telecommunications providers for technical services with regard to mobile smartphone payments based on near-field communication (NFC). The payment processor offers its partners a mobile card reader as a white label programme for the acceptance of card payments via smartphones or tablets.

=== eCommerce ===
In terms of acquiring, one focus is travel and transport. Already in 2007, Wirecard took over payments and credit control for the tour operator TUI, and in 2014 for KLM Royal Dutch Airlines. The product Supplier and Commission Payments (SCP) by Wirecard is also made to measure the travel sector. It is based on the automatic output of virtual credit cards and enables electronic payments to partners and suppliers, for instance for commission payments. In this way international payments can be made via electronic transfer of virtual credit card numbers.

Since 2014, Wirecard has offered its Checkout Portal – a fully automated application for easily connecting different payment methods in online shops, with a focus on SMEs and virtual marketplaces.

=== Digitalization of the retail sector ===
Wirecard also supports high-street retail with digitisation; an example of this is the collaborative project with T-Systems. In 2016, together with the WMF Group, Wirecard developed a mobile app which connects store purchases with online sales.

=== Alternative Chinese payment methods ===
Wirecard has been collaborating with Alipay since 2015, to offer Chinese tourists a familiar payment method during their travels in Europe. As part of this, Wirecard has integrated this alternative payment method into the till systems of retailers such as Printemps, The Body Shop and The National Bank of Greece. The payment procedure has also been integrated with retailers at Munich Airport.

Since July 2017, Wirecard has partnered with Tencent to also offer WeChat Pay.

=== Card issuing ===
Many companies worked with Wirecard to issue their own payment cards of various kinds. Some well-known partnerships include: Curve; start-up banks such as Atom and money apps including Revolut and Pokit, and spending management apps such as Loot.

== Financial data ==
Financial data in € millions
| Year | 2013 | (2014) | (2015) | (2016) | (2017) | (2018) |
|---|---|---|---|---|---|---|
| Revenue | 482 | 601 | 771 | 1,028 | 1,490 | 2,016 |
| Net income | 83 | 108 | 143 | 267 | 260 | 347 |
| Assets | 1,431 | 1,995 | 2,935 | 3,482 | 4,528 | 5,855 |
| Employees | 1,025 | 1,750 | 2,300 | 3,766 | 4,449 | 5,300 |

On June 22, 2020, Wirecard announced that financial data for the previous years might be incorrect. According to a report by the Süddeutsche Zeitung, the public prosecutor's office assumes that the company has manipulated balance sheets since 2014.

== List of subsidiaries ==
By 2017, Wirecard was a global company, with major presence on all continents.

Wirecard Card Solutions Ltd. (WDCS) was a wholly owned subsidiary headquartered in Newcastle upon Tyne, UK, with an e-money licence that allows it to issue virtual cards. It provided numerous mobile payment applications and Wirecard's own mobile payment app, Boon.

It entered the U.S. market in 2017 following completion of the takeover of Citi Prepaid Card Services, indicating that the business would increase fiscal-year EBITA by $20 million. Wirecard took over the Brazilian company MOIP in 2016. The previous year, in 2015, it entered the Indian market with the acquisition of the Great Indian Retail Group's payment business. Wirecard has been strengthening its operations in the Asia-Pacific region, the Middle East and Africa since 2014.

In August 2020, it was announced that Railsbank, a start-up sponsored by Visa, is set to buy the Wirecard's UK-based businesses. No financial information was disclosed and the deal is set to be finished in November 2020. Additionally, the Brazilian business of the company was sold to PagSeguro Digital, a firm based in New York City. In 2021, NomuPay acquired payment licenses from Wirecard's operations in several Asia-Pacific markets (Malaysia, Hong Kong, Philippines, and Thailand) as well as Turkey..

See below a list of some Wirecard subsidiaries (Partial list):

| Subsidiary company | City | Country |
|---|---|---|
| Wirecard Bank AG | Aschheim | Germany |
| Wirecard Technologies GmbH | Aschheim | Germany |
| Wirecard Acceptance Technologies GmbH | Aschheim | Germany |
| Wirecard Retail Services GmbH | Aschheim | Germany |
| Wirecard Global Sales GmbH | Aschheim | Germany |
| Wirecard Communication Services GmbH | Leipzig | Germany |
| Wirecard Technologies Indonesia | Jakarta | Indonesia |
| Wirecard Card Solutions Ltd | Newcastle upon Tyne | United Kingdom |
| Wirecard Central Eastern Europe GmbH | Graz | Austria |
| Wirecard S.A. | Bucharest | Romania |
| Wirecard Ödeme ve Elektronik Para Hizmetleri A.Ş. | Istanbul | Turkey |
| Wirecard Processing FZ LLC | Dubai | United Arab Emirates |
| Wirecard Singapore Pte Ltd | Singapore | Singapore |
| Wirecard Payment Solutions Malaysia Sdn Bhd | Kuala Lumpur | Malaysia |
| Wirecard India Private Ltd | Chennai | India |
| Wirecard NZ Limited | Auckland | New Zealand |
| Wirecard Hong Kong Limited | Hong Kong | Hong Kong SAR |
| Wirecard Africa Holdings Proprietary Ltd | Cape Town | South Africa |
| Wirecard Brasil S.A. | São Paulo | Brazil |
| Wirecard North America Inc. | Conshohocken | US |
| Wirecard UK and Ireland | Dublin | Ireland |
| Wirecard Australia A&I Pty Ltd | Melbourne | Australia |

== Bibliography ==
- Dan McCrum, Money Men: A Hot Startup, A Billion Dollar Fraud, A Fight for the Truth (Bantam Press, 2022) ISBN 9781787635043

== See also ==
- List of corporate collapses and scandals
- List of banks in Germany
