= Viceroy Research =

Investigative financial research group

Viceroy Research LLC is an international investigative financial research group registered in Delaware, United States. It was founded by a British short seller Fraser John Perring together with Australian partners Aiden Lau and Gabriel Bernarde in 2016. Perring and Viceroy have stirred considerable media interest because of their reports on firms like Wirecard. Of late, Viceroy has been known to bet against companies like Tesla, or Grenke.

In 2021, the South African Financial Sector Conduct Authority (FSCA) has fined Viceroy R50 million for damaging remarks that the short-selling firm made about South Africa's Capitec Bank.

In October 2021, it issued a damning report against Adler Real Estate for inflated valuations and undisclosed related party deals. KPMG probed the allegations and cleared the company of systemic fraud, but was unable to refute all the claims. In May 2022, KPMG quit its contract. Adler eventually was unable to repay its debt. In April 2023, it won approval in court, against the opposition of some bondholders, to suspend coupon payments and extend maturities of bonds due in 2024.

In September 2024, OCCRP reported that following Viceroy's investigations into Steward Health Care's involvement with the 2019 Maltese hospital corruption scandal Fraser Perring became subject of a "wide 'false flag' campaign" by Audere International, on behalf of Steward. This included Labour MP Liam Byrne "suggesting" in March 2023 during UK Parliament that Perring was a Russian agent.

== List of short attack reports ==
The following table displays the companies Viceroy Research has published reports about.

Target	Ticker	First report	Last report	Number of reports
Hexagon	Nasdaq Stockholm: HEXA B	2023-7-19	2023-7-29	3
Abalance	TYO: 38560	2023-5-16	2023-5-16	3
Medical Properties Trust	NYSE: MPW	2023-1-26	2023-3-17	15
Samhällsbyggnadsbolaget i Norden	Nasdaq Stockholm: SBB B	2022-2-21	2022-12-9	9
Home REIT	LSE: HOME	2022-11-23	2022-11-30	2
Truecaller	Nasdaq Stockholm: TRUE B	2022-9-28	2022-10-5	3
Adler Group	FWB: ADJ	2021-10-6	2022-5-3	5
SANT	XTRA:SANT	2021-12-16	2022-1-25	2
Pagseguro	NYSE: PAGS	2021-10-27	2021-10-27	1
Reconnaissance Energy Africa	TSX-V: RECO	2021-6-24	2021-9-7	8
Tyro	ASX:TYR	2021-1-14	2021-1-19	3
Wirecard (note: as Zatarra)	n/a:	2020-7-3	2020-11-6	2
Grenke AG	VIE:GLJ	2020-9-15	2020-10-22	9
Sorrento Therapeutics	Nasdaq: SRNEQ	2020-5-20	2020-5-20	1
Athenex	Nasdaq: ATNXQ	2019-10-22	2019-11-20	10
Pareteum	Nasdaq: TEUM	2018-9-6	2019-7-17	9
Ebix	Nasdaq: EBIX	2018-12-3	2019-7-1	7
MiMedx	Nasdaq: MDXG	2017-9-20	2019-6-17	28
NEPI Rockcastle	JSE: NRP	2018-11-28	2018-12-6	3
Capitec	JSE: CPI	2018-1-30	2018-7-12	7
AMD	Nasdaq: AMD	2018-3-13	2018-3-22	2
ProSieben	FWB: PSM	2018-3-6	2018-3-6	1
Steinhoff ETR	JSE: SNH	2017-12-6	2017-12-6	1
Neuroderm	Nasdaq: NDRM	2017-8-30	2017-9-6	4
Caesarstone	Nasdaq: CSTE	2017-6-14	2017-8-1	2
Quintis	ASXL:QIN	2017-5-14	2017-5-14	1
Syrah Resources	ASX:SYR	2016-12-23	2016-12-23	1

== Controversies ==
=== Allegations ===
- On 16 March 2023, a question was raised in the UK's House of Commons by Liam Byrne MP about Viceroy Research involvement in a short-selling attack on Babcock International (involved with build and maintenance of UK's nuclear submarines) and Fraser John Perring's links and frequent trips to Moscow:
- "Can we have a debate in Government time on the activities of short-selling attack group Viceroy Research and its leader Fraser Perring? I am told that it is working hand in glove with Boatman Capital, which launched the short-selling attack on Babcock International while it was overhauling our nuclear submarines. Mr Perring is a not infrequent visitor to Moscow, and is now targeting Home REIT, which provides homelessness services, including to homeless veterans. We must ensure that short-selling groups are not another weapon in Putin's arsenal. Where there are links between short-selling attack groups and the Kremlin, we need to know."
- In 2022, allegations were made against Viceroy Research as part of continued investigations into Viceroy's short attack against Capitec (for which Viceroy had already been fined for misleading reports) that Viceroy was paid R10M for production of its reports into Capitec.

=== Legal cases ===
- Medical Properties Trust, Inc. v. Viceroy Research LLC (2023): MPT filed a lawsuit against Viceroy Research in federal court, alleging that Viceroy had defamed the company by publishing false and misleading statements about its business practices. In June 2023, Medical Properties Trust won a preliminary ruling in its defamation lawsuit over an alleged “short and distort” scheme by Viceroy Research.

=== Regulatory investigations and fines ===
- In 2022, the FCA in the United Kingdom opened questions into Viceroy Research's relationship with Cayman Island hedge fund Oasis Management with regards to collusion and insider trading.
- In 2021, the South African FSCA fined Viceroy Research R50M for false and misleading statements about the company Capitec in Viceroy's 2018 reports which caused a 23% share price drop.
