= Adler Real Estate =

Real estate company

- Type: Private
- ISIN: DE0005008007
- Industry: real estate
- Founded: 2002 in Berlin, Germany
- Headquarters: Berlin, Germany
- Area served: Germany
- Key people: Thierry Beaudemoulin (CEO; COO); Sven-Christian Frank (CLO)
- Website: adler-ag.com

ADLER Real Estate AG (formerly Adlerwerke, formerly H. Kleyer AG) is a listed real estate company in Germany, formerly based in Luxembourg. The main activities are the purchase and management of residential real estate all over Germany. The company owned about 52.000 residential units in 2020.

== History ==
Short-seller Fraser Perring's investment firm Viceroy Research put pressure on the Adler Group in October 2021 with releases in which it made serious allegations. This involved, among other things, the valuation of real estate projects.

Adler Group presented its balance sheet in 2022 at the last minute before the deadline. Operating profit increased in 2021, but Adler Group has a loss of almost 1.2 billion euros due to depreciation. Adler announced that the commissioned auditing company KPMG was unable to issue an opinion on the consolidated and individual financial statements for 2021. As a result, several members of the Board of Directors resigned at the end of April 2022.

In June 2022, it became known that Adler intentionally fails to pay bills on a large scale. The broadcasters NDR and rbb had a list from April 2021 that lists thousands of open claims that the Adler subsidiary Consus apparently did not or not fully complied with.

== Specialty ==
Adler Real Estate specializes in the purchase and operation of affordable real estate. These are rented out to poor and low-income tenants. Nationwide, tenants keep complaining about the unsustainable condition of the properties. Rent cuts against Adler are usually not implemented because the rent comes directly from the state unemployment benefit (Jobcenter).

Holsten Areal, Hamburg

In 2016 Holsten Brewery sold its former area in Hamburg-Altona. In 2019, Adler Real Estate bought the area for 328 Millionen Euro, five times its worth in 2016. Adler said, they will build 1300 units for housing. In 2022 the area was still fallow.

== Criticism ==
In 2021, investors called for a significant reduction in leverage. The former Wirecard-hunter, the British short seller Fraser Perring, allegations against the company, which include an allegedly inflated balance sheet. The company denied the allegations. ADLER Real Estate sold a fifth of its housing stock in 2021. 15,350 apartments and 186 commercial units worth EUR 1.485 billion were sold to competitor LEG Immobilien. Adler Group presented its balance sheet in 2022 at the last minute before the deadline. Operating profit increased in 2021, but Adler Group has a loss of almost 1.2 billion euros due to depreciation.
