= Cam Simpson =

Cam Simpson is a London-based writer and journalist. He is currently the senior international correspondent for Bloomberg Businessweek in London, and Bloomberg News. Previously, he worked for The Wall Street Journal, with posts in the Middle East and Washington. and as a foreign correspondent for the Chicago Tribune where he was responsible for covering US foreign policy and investigative projects in Washington and overseas.

== Early life and education ==
Simpson was raised in St. Charles, Illinois. He obtained his degree in political science and journalism from Eastern Illinois University.

== Career ==
In an interview with the Poynter Institute, Simpson said many of his investigative pieces for Businessweek focus on connecting people who pull the levers of power in the world with "the people who get caught in the gears." Several of Simpson's investigative features for Businessweek have focused on the world's technology giants. A 2014 piece detailed how Samsung tried to silence or thwart the families of young women who contracted rare cancers working on its assembly lines (the company issued an apology on South Korean television for its treatment of the families). After a 2013 story about the exploitation of foreign migrant workers who made iPhone cameras, Apple said it banned all forms of bonded labor from its supplier factories worldwide. A 2012 cover story exposed death and environmental destruction in the global supply chain for all smartphones and tablets, for which Apple also later acknowledged its role.

Beyond tech companies, Simpson's reporting also included a 2014 piece detailing the role of the largest-listed hedge fund on Wall Street in providing a $100 million cash infusion for Robert Mugabe's government as he was rolling out a campaign of violence, torture and murder to hold onto power in Zimbabwe. Simpson also has done features for the magazine on the corporate structure and financial power of the Islamic State. In September 2015, Publisher's Marketplace announced that HarperCollins had signed Simpson to write a narrative non-fiction book about a trio of human rights lawyers and a journalist who unravel the mysterious murders of a dozen unlikely victims of the Iraq war, following a trail of profiteers from the Himalayas to Houston.

Previously, he worked for The Wall Street Journal, with posts in the Middle East and Washington and as a correspondent for the Chicago Tribune where he was responsible for covering US foreign policy and investigative projects in Washington and overseas. He previously covered federal crime and organized crime for the Tribune in Chicago. Before his time at the Tribune, he worked for the Chicago Sun-Times covering federal and organized crime, the FBI, and US courts. Simpson has also worked for The Indianapolis Star, the Evansville Courier, and The News-Gazette in Champaign, Illinois.

== Awards ==
- 2015 Overseas Press Club of America
- 2014 Overseas Press Club of America (Joe and Laurie Dine Award for best reporting on human rights in any medium)
- 2005 Overseas Press Club of America
- 2003 Overseas Press Club of America (citation for human rights reporting)
- 2014 Gerald Loeb Award for Magazine business journalism for "Stranded: An iPhone Tester Caught in Apple's Supply Chain"
- 2005 George Polk Award, International Reporting
- 2003 George Polk Award, National Reporting
- Robert F. Kennedy Journalism Award, International Reporting
- The Hillman Prize
- Foreign Press Association Media Awards (London)
- National Press Club Award
- Edward Scott Beck Award for Foreign Reporting
- 2021 Gerald Loeb Award for Investigative business journalism for "Addicted to Profit", Bloomberg News
