= Paul Murphy (British journalist) =

British journalist

Paul Murphy is the founder editor of FT Alphaville, a financial blog owned by the Financial Times. He was appointed in early 2006 to develop the FT's online capability. Murphy was previously financial editor of The Guardian newspaper and, prior to that, worked at Sunday Business, The Daily Telegraph and The Banker.

In 2009 he relocated from London to New York City to expand Alphaville's influence there.

In 2011, Murphy launched an emerging markets focused service, FT Tilt, with Stacy-Marie Ishmael, although this was closed down later in the year and Murphy returned to run FT Alphaville in London.

He was named Wincott Senior Financial Journalist in 2003.

He was succeeded in 2017 by Izabella Kaminska.

== Awards ==
- 2021 Gerald Loeb Award for Investigative business Journalism for "Inside Wirecard", The Financial Times
