= Markus Braun =

Austrian tech investor (born 1969)

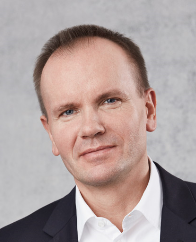
- Born: 1969 (age 56–57); Vienna, Austria
- Education: Technical University of Vienna; University of Vienna
- Occupation: Businessman
- Title: Former CEO and CTO, Wirecard
- Term: 2002–2020
- Parent

Criminal details
- Arrested: 22 June 2020

Markus Braun (born 1969) is an Austrian tech investor, the former CEO and CTO at the now insolvent payment processor, Wirecard AG from January 2002 until his resignation and arrest in June 2020. Braun stepped down from Wirecard amidst fraud allegations, but has denied any wrongdoing. Braun was in pre-trial detention at the Augsburg-Gablingen prison and was transferred to Stadelheim prison in Munich on November 10, 2022. On December 8, 2022, the criminal proceedings against him and two other former Wirecard managers began at the Munich regional court. Court cases were pending as of 2024.

== Early life ==
Markus Braun was born in Vienna. He is the son of a director of a Folk high school and a school teacher.

Braun graduated from the Technical University of Vienna with a degree in commercial computer science and business studies, and then went on to earn a PhD in social and economic sciences from the University of Vienna in 2000.

== Career ==
Braun started his career as a consultant at Contrast Management Consulting GmbH, a position he held until November 1998. Between 1998 and 2001, he worked with KPMG Consulting AG in Munich.

=== Wirecard ===
In 2002, Braun joined the management board of Wirecard AG and became CEO and CTO of the company. Wirecard was one of the world's largest digital platforms in the area of financial commerce and is headquartered in Germany. It was one of Germany's Top 30 most valuable companies on the German stock market (DAX) and has been ranked in the “Top 100 Most Innovative Growth Companies in the World” by Forbes Magazine.

Much of what Braun said was questioned long before Wirecard admitted fraud in June 2020. In 2017, for example, Braun told investors that Wirecard was using the latest artificial intelligence technology to analyze data. However according to third parties, staff were instead cobbling together spreadsheets of customer information. Braun owned more than 7% of Wirecard shares, making him the largest single shareholder of Wirecard at the time.

In 2017, Braun was reappointed as a CEO of Wirecard. He responded to his reappointment by stating: "We will drive the digitization of payment processes using internet technology on a global level, and we will make Wirecard a global leader in this sector." In 2018, Braun was introduced as having more than 15 years of experience in the digital payment industry and was a regular speaker at industry related events and different national and international media.

According to Braun in 2018, the entire retail payment infrastructure was to be replaced by technology merging all payment streams into a single, fully digital system within the following decade. The FAZ reported in 2018 that according to Braun digitalization, if done right, would generate an increase in sales for the brick and mortar business similar to the expanding online commerce. He considers cash to become an exception and says, that technology can never be justified by itself and can only be successful when it delivers visible value-added for customers and merchants.

In September 2018, Braun's shares were worth over EUR 1.6 billion. He reduced his stake to around 2.5 percent through sales on June 24, 2020, resulting in a sales value of EUR 155 million.

=== Resignation and arrest ===
In early June 2020, the German Federal Financial Supervisory Authority (BaFin) filed a complaint against Braun and his fellow board members for making misleading statements in two mandatory disclosures by Wirecard. On June 18, 2020, Wirecard's share price fell by more than 70 percent due to fraud suspicions, a lack of transparency and other uncertainties after auditors refused to certify the annual report due to a lack of supporting documents.

On June 19, 2020, Braun resigned as CEO of Wirecard, after more than US$2 billion was found to be missing from the company's accounts. In late 2017, Deutsche Bank loaned Braun €150 million and accepted half of his 7% share in Wirecard as collateral. The loan was not renewed after the company was accused of accounting fraud. On 22 June, Braun was detained by German police "on suspicion of accounting fraud and market manipulation" after he had turned himself in. On 23 June, he was released on bail, set at 5 million Euros ($5.7 million). On June 30, Braun was dismissed by the supervisory board of Wirecard AG. On 22 July, he was arrested again.

In March 2022, Munich public prosecutors charged him and two former Wirecard managers with fraud, breach of trust and accounting manipulation. If found guilty on all these charges, he could face up to 15 years in prison. Braun maintains that he is innocent and himself a victim of fraud.

In court, public prosecutors accuse Braun of fabricating fictitious third-party transactions. The accusations are based on the statements made by ex-manager Oliver Bellenhaus. The missing 1.9 billion euros from third-party transactions led to the collapse of Wirecard in the summer of 2020. Insolvency administrator Michael Jaffe has not found any traces of the alleged transactions and considers it proven that these deals had never taken place.

== Advisory roles ==
Braun advised Deutsche Bank, in particular on issues related to digital banking. Since 2017, he was a member of the "Staff Unit for Strategy, Analysis and Planning" (also known as Think Austria) of the Austrian chancellor Sebastian Kurz, which was set up in the Federal Chancellery after the First Kurz government took office. After the dissolution of this government, the body was dissolved by the Bierlein government, but was re-established after the 2019 Austrian legislative election under the Second Kurz government. While Antonella Mei-Pochtler, the head of the staff unit, named him as one of the experts involved in January 2020, a spokesperson for the Federal Chancellery stated that Braun had not been working in the staff unit since the government took office, after investigations into accounting fraud began. Kurz also publicly distanced himself from Braun on June 23, 2020.

== Party donations ==
According to the party's financial statements, Braun donated a total of EUR 125,000 to NEOS between 2014 and 2016. During the 2017 Austrian legislative election campaign, the Austrian People's Party, which had recently been taken over by Sebastian Kurz, received a total of EUR 70,000 and Braun publicly endorsed Kurz.

== Bibliography ==
- Dan McCrum, Money Men: A Hot Startup, A Billion Dollar Fraud, A Fight for the Truth (Bantam Press, 2022) ISBN 9781787635043
