= Round-tripping (finance) =

Form of barter where a company sells then buys back an asset

Round-tripping, also known as round-trip transactions or Lazy Susans (from the turntable of the same name), is defined by The Wall Street Journal as a form of barter that involves a company selling "an unused asset to another company, while at the same time agreeing to buy back the same or similar assets at about the same price." Swapping assets on a round-trip produces no net economic substance, but may be fraudulently reported as a series of productive sales and beneficial purchases on the books of the companies involved, violating the substance over form accounting principle. The companies appear to be growing and very busy, but the round-tripping business does not generate profits. Growth is an attractive factor to speculative investors, even if profits are lacking; such investment benefits companies and motivates them to undertake the illusory growth of round-tripping. They played a crucial part in temporarily inflating the market capitalization of energy traders such as Enron, CMS Energy, Reliant Energy, Dynegy and financial service provider Wirecard.

In international scenarios, round-tripping is a method of structuring to evade taxes and/or to launder money.

Companies have used round-tripping to distort the market by establishing false revenue benchmarks, aiming to meet or beat the numbers put out by Wall Street stock analysts. As a result of abusive round trips, barter between publicly held companies has become discredited among professional investors.

== See also ==
- Accounting scandals
- Bill and hold
- Channel stuffing
- Forensic accounting
- List of corporate collapses and scandals
- Painting the tape
