= Pav Gill =

Singaporean whistleblower

Pav Gill is a Singaporean lawyer who was the whistleblower that uncovered the Wirecard scandal, one of the largest corporate frauds in history. Gill was the former Singapore-based legal head for Wirecard's Asia-Pacific region.

== Early life ==
Born in Singapore, Gill is the only child of a Singaporean single mother, and grew up in subsidized public housing. Note: 77.2% of Singaporeans live in public housing. He attended Victoria School and graduated in law from the National University of Singapore in 2008. In September 2017, he was hired by Wirecard as their first in-house Head of Legal for Asia-Pacific, covering 11 markets in the region.

== 2023 ==
In September 2023, Gill founded the whistleblowing platform, Confide Platform, to facilitate the detection and reporting of misconduct at companies.

== Awards ==
Gill has been awarded the ACFE Cliff Robertson Sentinel Award and the Blueprint for Free Speech Special Recognition Award, for integrity and bravery in the public interest.
