= Grenke =

German leasing and factoring company

Grenke AG

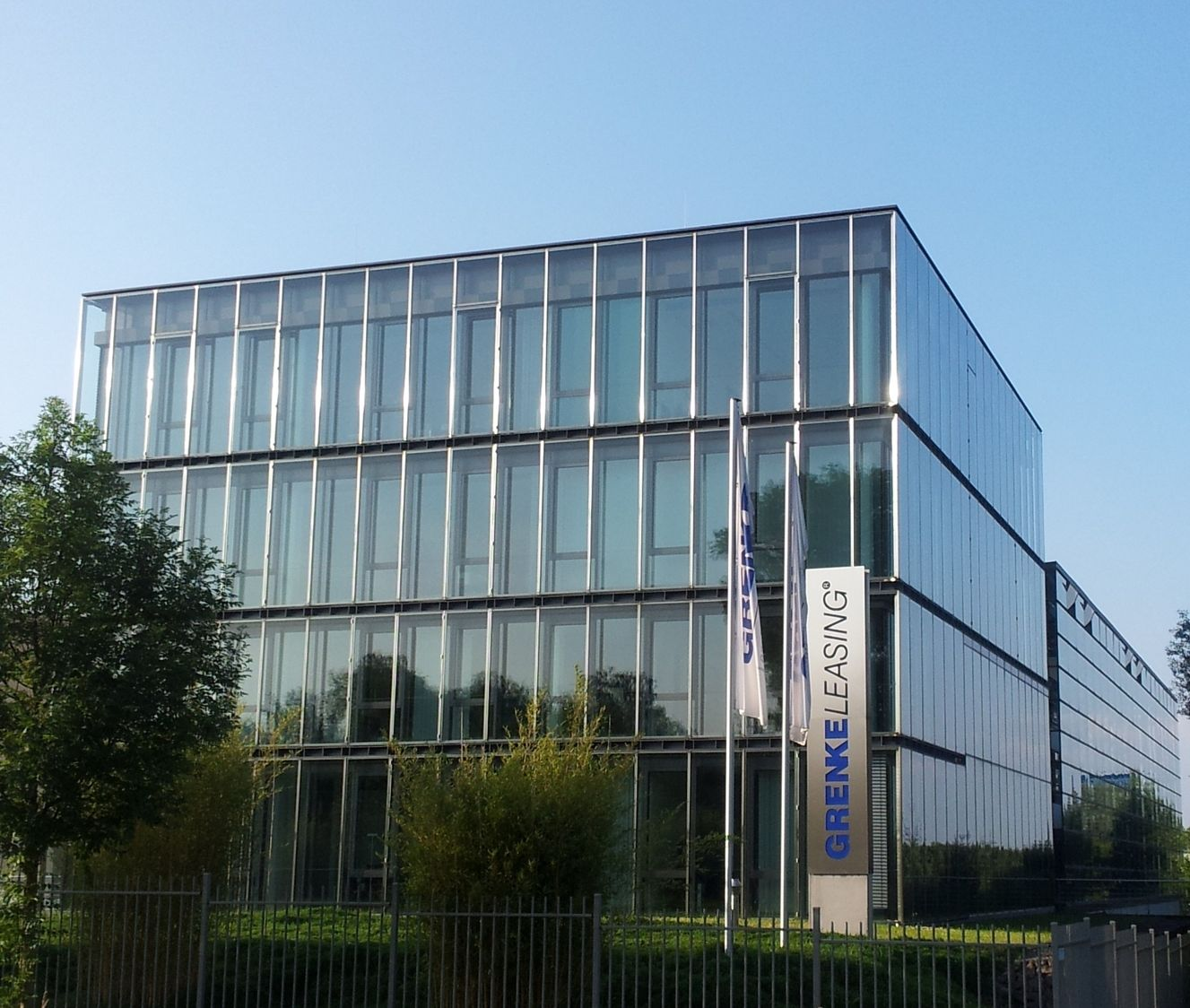
- Headquarters Baden-Baden
- Company type: Aktiengesellschaft
- Traded as: FWB: GLJ; SDAX
- ISIN: DE000A161N30
- Industry: Leasing
- Founded: 1978; 48 years ago
- Headquarters: Baden-Baden, Germany
- Key people: Dr Sebastian Hirsch (Chair of the Board)
- Revenue: €3.46 billion (2023)
- Number of employees: 2,068
- Website: www.grenke.de

Grenke AG is a German manufacturer-independent leasing company which is specialized in office communication-products, including printers, copiers, telephone systems, servers and laptop computers. Besides its leasing-activities, Grenke makes a notable portion of its revenue with factoring services. By acquiring the German private bank Hesse Newman in 2009, the company obtained a banking license. The most important markets for the company are Germany, France and Italy.

== History ==
The company was founded by Wolfgang Grenke in 1978. Internationalization was driven forward, especially since the 2000s. Since June 2019, Grenke is included in the MDAX index on the Frankfurt Stock Exchange.

In early 2009, the company acquired a banking license through the purchase of the former private bank Hesse Newman, which was then renamed Grenke Bank.

On May 3, 2016, the general meeting of Grenkeleasing AG decided to change its name to Grenke AG. This step was justified by the increasing importance of the areas of factoring and banking.

At the end of February 2018, company founder Grenke resigned from the management board after his term of office had expired. His previous deputy, Antje Leminsky, took over as CEO on March 1. Wolfgang Grenke was elected to the supervisory board at the company's annual general meeting on May 3, 2018. Since August 1, 2021, the former capital markets director of Bayern LB Michael Bücker was CEO of Grenke AG. Wolfgang Grenke left the supervisory board on July 29, 2021. Since February 16, 2023 the former CFO Dr Sebastian Hirsch has been CEO of the Grenke AG.

On June 24, 2019, the Grenke share rose from the SDAX to the MDAX. Due to the slump in the share price as a result of allegations of accounting fraud, Grenke shares were relegated to the SDAX on December 21, 2020.

In 2020, Grenke entered the US-market by establishing a franchising company headquartered in Phoenix, Arizona.

== See also ==
- List of banks in Germany
