= FT Alphaville =

Blog of the Financial Times

- Available in: English
- Owner: Financial Times
- Editor: Robin Wigglesworth
- Website: ftalphaville.ft.com
- Registration: Optional
- Launched: 2006; 20 years ago

FT Alphaville is a daily news and commentary service for financial market professionals created by the Financial Times in October 2006. The founding editor was Paul Murphy. He was succeeded in 2017 by Izabella Kaminska. Kaminska resigned in 2022 and was replaced by Robin Wigglesworth.

== Overview ==
The service includes an email-based morning financial brief, a blog, and two message boards, one called "Markets Live" and another, added two years after its founding, called "The Long Room". Commenting on the blog or participating on either of the message boards require registration; the Long Room is limited to current and retired financial professionals.

== Camp Alphaville ==
On 2 July 2014 the FT Alphaville team organised Camp Alphaville, a one-day finance festival in the heart of the City of London, in which over 500 people took part. The camp featured a main stage that hosted rolling discussions and interviews ranging from the future of money to "nuts markets". More focused discussions were held on the sidelines in inflatable igloos. Speakers and attendees were also able to beam into the event via autonomous telepresence robots.

The event returned in 2015, and in 2016 under the name of "FT Festival of Finance".

== Naming ==
The service is called "Alphaville", in reference to "the City term 'Alpha', meaning 'absolute returns' … above and beyond the industry benchmark." "The Long Room" is named after a dining room of a City of London bar/restaurant on Throgmorton Street that used to be frequented by stockbrokers, bankers and insurance brokers when the London Stock Exchange was located on Threadneedle Street.

== Recognition ==
FT Alphaville won a Harold Wincott Award for 2007, in the category of online journalism. It subsequently won Best Business Blog in both the Judge's Panel and the People's Voice categories, at the 2008 Webby Awards.

== See also ==
- Planet Money
- Investors Chronicle
