= 2022 FIFA World Cup =

Association football tournament in Qatar

كأس العالم لكرة القدم 2022 (Arabic)

Tournament details
- Host country: Qatar
- Dates: 20 November – 18 December
- Teams: 32 (from 5 confederations)
- Venues: 8 (in 5 host cities)

Final positions
- Champions: Argentina (3rd title)
- Runners-up: France
- Third place: Croatia
- Fourth place: Morocco

Tournament statistics
- Matches played: 64
- Goals scored: 172 (2.69 per match)
- Attendance: 3,404,252 (53,191 per match)
- Top scorer: (France national football team) Kylian Mbappé (8 goals)
- Best player: (Argentina national football team) Lionel Messi
- Best young player: (Argentina national football team) Enzo Fernández
- Best goalkeeper: (Argentina national football team) Emiliano Martínez
- Fair play award: England

The 2022 FIFA World Cup was the 22nd FIFA World Cup, the quadrennial world championship for national football teams organised by FIFA. It took place in Qatar from 20 November to 18 December 2022, after the country was awarded the hosting rights in 2010. It was the first World Cup to be held in the Middle East and the Arabian Peninsula, and the second in an Asian country after the 2002 tournament in South Korea and Japan. (Note: The 2018 competition, held in the European part of Russia, also featured one or two Asian venues depending on the definition used for the intercontinental boundary.)

This tournament was the last with 32 participating teams, before increasing to 48 for the 2026 World Cup. To avoid the extremes of Qatar's hot climate in summers, the event was held in November and December, becoming the first to take place in the end of the year and outside the traditional months of May, June, and July. It was held over a reduced time frame of 29 days with 64 matches played in eight venues across five cities. Qatar entered the event—their first World Cup—automatically as the host's national team, alongside 31 teams determined by the qualification process.

Morocco made history by becoming the first African nation to reach the semi-final of a World Cup, falling short 0–2 against France. Argentina were crowned the champions after winning the final against the title holder France 4–2 on penalties following a 3–3 draw after extra time. It was Argentina's third title and their first since 1986. Argentina were the first nation from outside of Europe to win the tournament since 2002. French player Kylian Mbappé became the first player to score a hat-trick in a World Cup final since Geoff Hurst in the 1966 final and won the Golden Boot as he scored the most goals (eight) during the tournament. Mbappé also became the first player to score in two consecutive finals since Vavá of Brazil did the same in 1958 and 1962.

Argentine captain Lionel Messi was voted the tournament's best player, winning his second Golden Ball. The tournament has been considered exceptionally poetic as the capstone of his career, with the win fulfilling for some commentators a previously unmet criterion to be regarded as the greatest player of all time. Teammates Emiliano Martínez and Enzo Fernández won the Golden Glove, awarded to the tournament's best goalkeeper, and the Young Player Award, awarded to the tournament's best young player, respectively. With 172 goals, the tournament set a record for the highest number of goals scored in the 32-team format, with every participating team scoring at least one goal.

The choice to host the World Cup in Qatar attracted significant criticism, with concerns raised over the country's treatment of migrant workers, women, and members of the LGBTQ+ community, as well as Qatar's climate and lack of a strong football culture. There were also allegations that Qatar used bribery to obtain hosting rights, as well as allegations of wider FIFA corruption. (Note: Citations:)

== Schedule ==
Unlike previous FIFA World Cups, which are typically played in June and July, because of Qatar's intense summer heat and often fairly high humidity, the 2022 World Cup was played in November and December. As a result, the World Cup was unusually staged in the middle of the seasons of many domestic association football leagues, which started in late July or August, including all of the major European leagues, which had been obliged to incorporate extended breaks into their domestic schedules to accommodate the World Cup. Major European competitions had scheduled their respective competitions group matches to be played before the World Cup, to avoid playing group matches the following year.

The match schedule was confirmed by FIFA on 15 July 2020. The group stage was set to begin on 21 November, with four matches every day. Later, the schedule was tweaked by moving the Qatar vs Ecuador game to 20 November, after Qatar lobbied FIFA to allow their team to open the tournament. The final was played on 18 December 2022, National Day, at Lusail Stadium. Unlike previous tournaments where the match venues and kick-off times for each fixture were set prior to the draw, the assignment of group fixtures for each matchday to a specific venue and kick-off time was only made after the final draw, with the teams of each specific fixture known. This was due to the close proximity of the venues, which allowed the organisers to optimise stadium allocation for spectators and kick-off times for television audiences.

The matches for each group were allocated to the following stadiums:

- Groups A, B, E, F: Al Bayt Stadium, Khalifa International Stadium, Al Thumama Stadium, Ahmad bin Ali Stadium
- Groups C, D, G, H: Lusail Stadium, Stadium 974, Education City Stadium, Al Janoub Stadium

FIFA confirmed the group stage venue and kick-off times on 1 April 2022, following the draw.

== Prize money ==
In April 2022, FIFA announced the prizes for all participating nations. Each qualified team received $1.5 million before the competition to cover preparation costs with each team receiving at least $9 million in prize money. This edition's total prize pool was $440 million, $40 million greater than the prize pool of the previous tournament.

Place	Teams	Amount (in millions)	
Place	Teams	Per team	Total
Champions	1	$42	$42
Runner-up	1	$30	$30
Third place	1	$27	$27
Fourth place	1	$25	$25
5th–8th place (quarter-finals)	4	$17	$68
9th–16th place (round of 16)	8	$13	$104
17th–32nd place (group stage)	16	$9	$144
Total	32	$440	

== Rule changes ==
The tournament featured new substitution rules whereby teams could make up to five substitutions in normal time, and an additional substitution in extra time. In addition, it was the first World Cup to feature concussion substitutions, whereby each team was permitted to use a maximum of one concussion substitute during a match. A concussion substitution did not count towards a team's quota of regular substitutions. Iranian goalkeeper Alireza Beiranvand suffered a concussion in his country's opening match against England and was replaced by Hossein Hosseini. This was the first use of a dedicated concussion substitute during a World Cup.

== Host selection ==
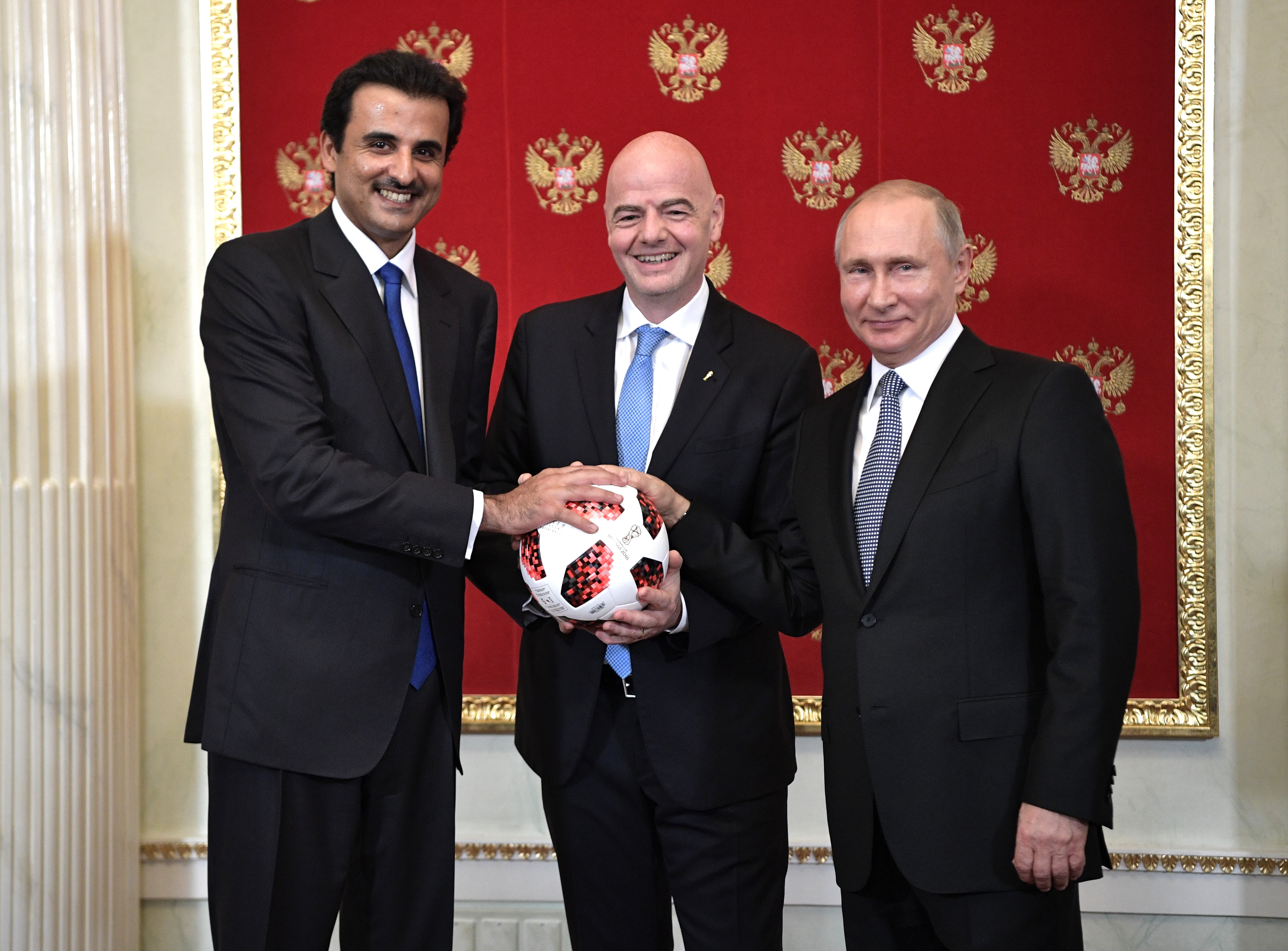
Russian President Vladimir Putin handing over the symbolic relay baton for the hosting rights of the 2022 FIFA World Cup to Qatar's Emir Tamim bin Hamad Al Thani in June 2018.

The bidding procedure to host the 2018 and 2022 FIFA World Cups began in January 2009. National associations had until 2 February 2009 to register interest. Initially, 11 bids were made for the 2018 FIFA World Cup, but Mexico withdrew from proceedings, and Indonesia's bid was rejected by FIFA in February 2010 after the Indonesian Football Association failed to submit a letter of Indonesian government guarantee to support the bid.

After UEFA were guaranteed to host the 2018 event, members of UEFA were no longer in contention to host in 2022. There were five bids remaining for the 2022 FIFA World Cup: Australia, Japan, Qatar, South Korea, and the United States. The 22-member FIFA Executive Committee convened in Zürich, Switzerland, on 2 December 2010 to vote to select the hosts of both tournaments. Two FIFA executive committee members were suspended before the vote in relation to allegations of corruption regarding their votes. The decision to host the 2022 World Cup in Qatar, which was graded as having "high operational risk", generated criticism from media commentators. It was criticised by many as being part of the FIFA corruption scandals, which led to the 2015 FIFA corruption case.

The voting patterns were as follows:

2022 FIFA bidding (majority 12 votes)
Bidders	Votes			
Bidders	Round 1	Round 2	Round 3	Round 4
Qatar	11	10	11	14
United States	3	5	6	8
South Korea	4	5	5	Eliminated
Japan	3	2	Eliminated	
Australia	1	Eliminated		

=== Cost of hosting the tournament ===
At an estimated cost of over $220 billion, it is the most expensive World Cup ever held to date; this figure is disputed by Qatari officials, including organising CEO Nasser Al Khater, who said the true cost was $8 billion, and other figures related to overall infrastructure development since the World Cup was awarded to Qatar in 2010.

== Venues ==
Seven of the eight venues, including Lusail Stadium, the venue for the final, were new stadiums built specifically for the 2022 FIFA World Cup. The eighth was heavily renovated.

The first five proposed venues for the World Cup were unveiled at the beginning of March 2010. Qatar intended that the stadiums should reflect its history and culture, and for the designs to meet the following terms of reference: legacy, comfort, accessibility, and sustainability. The stadiums were equipped with cooling systems that aim to reduce temperatures within the stadium by up to 20 °C (36 °F).

Their marketing included statements describing the stadiums as zero waste, and the upper tiers of the stadiums will be disassembled after the World Cup and donated to countries with less developed sports infrastructure. Qatar aspired to be compliant and certified by the Global Sustainability Assessment System (GSAS) for all the World Cup stadiums. All of the five stadium projects launched were designed by German architect Albert Speer & Partners. The Al Bayt and Al Wakrah stadiums were the only indoor stadiums of the eight used.

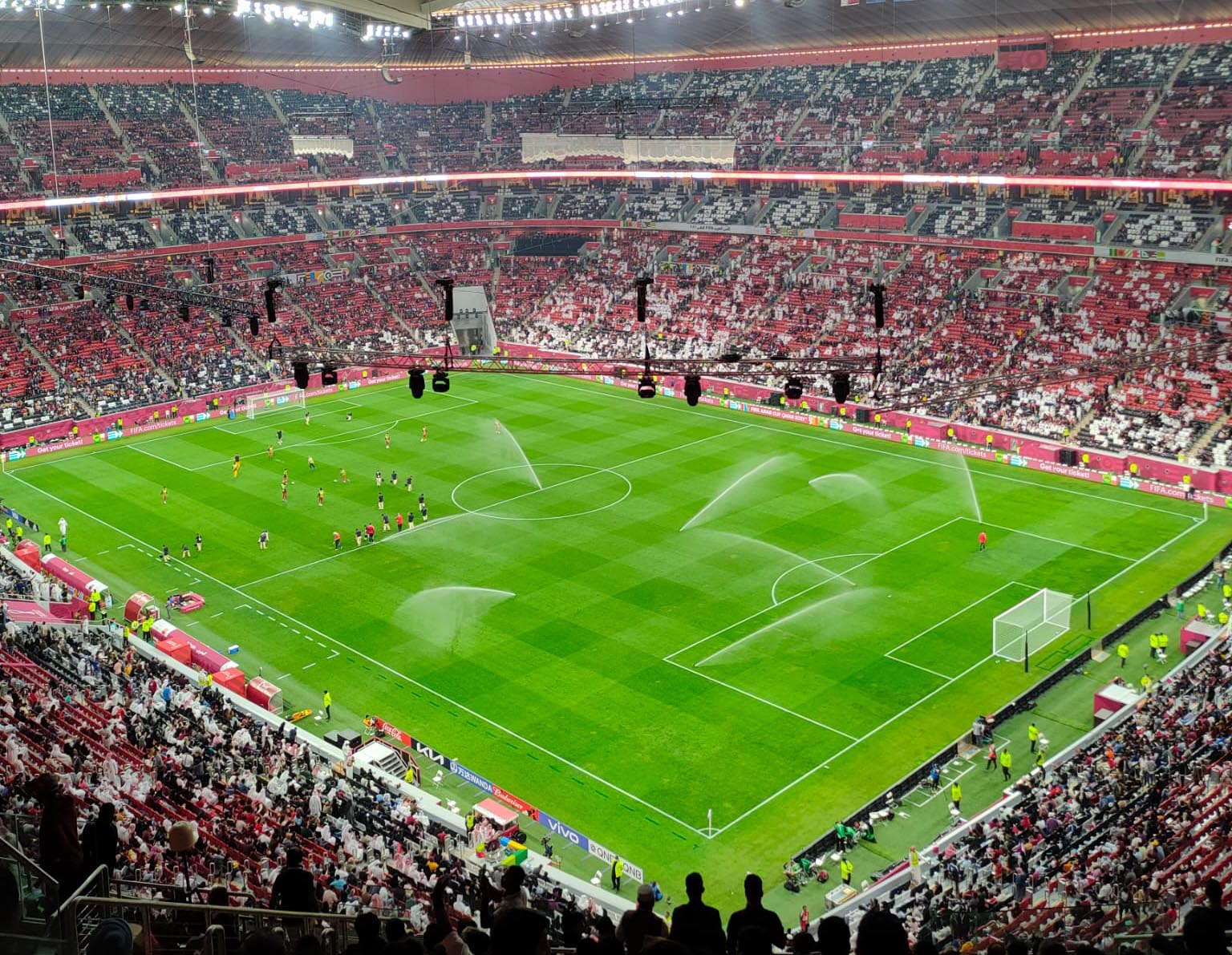
Some venues, such as the 68,000-seat Al Bayt Stadium, were planned to have their upper tiers of seating removed to reduce capacity after the tournament, however this is yet to happen.

In an April 2013 report by Merrill Lynch, the organisers in Qatar requested that FIFA approve a smaller number of stadiums due to the growing costs. Bloomberg said that Qatar wished to cut the number of venues to eight or nine from the twelve originally planned. By April 2017, FIFA had yet to finalise the number of stadiums Qatar must have readied in five years' time. Qatar's Supreme Committee for Delivery and Legacy (SC) said it expected there would be eight in and near Doha, with the exception of Al Khor.

Eight stadiums in five Qatari cities were built or renovated for the FIFA World Cup. Between 2010 (when Qatar were announced as hosts) and 2022, seven of the eight stadiums were built (some in place of older, outdated venues) and the Khalifa International Stadium was renovated for the tournament.

- Al Khor: Al Bayt Stadium (new). The first piles were driven into the ground in 2014. On 30 November 2021 it hosted its first match.
- Lusail: Lusail Stadium (new). The construction of the stadium was started on 11 April 2017. It was completed on 21 November 2021.
- Al Rayyan: Ahmad bin Ali Stadium (new). The stadium was built on the demolished former stadium site. It was commissioned on 18 December 2020.
- Al Rayyan: Education City Stadium (new). It was completed on 15 June 2020.
- Al Rayyan: Khalifa International Stadium (heavily renovated). The largest stadium in the country at the time, it was closed for renovation in 2014. It was commissioned in May 2017.
- Doha: Al Thumama Stadium (new). Construction was completed on 21 October 2021.
- Doha: Stadium 974 (new). Construction commenced in 2018. It was completed on 30 November 2021 and had hosted some of the matches in 2021 FIFA Arab Cup.
- Al Wakrah: Al Janoub Stadium (new). Construction officially started in 2014 and was completed on 16 May 2019.

Of these eight stadiums, all but two have since been either dismantled, or have been moderately or heavily modified. The Stadium 974 was supposed to be dismantled after the tournament; as of November 2024 however, this has not happened and the stadium has sat abandoned in its original site—this stadium was the first planned temporary stadium ever used for a FIFA World Cup. Lusail Stadium, Al Bayt Stadium, Ahmad bin Ali Stadium, Education City Stadium, Al Thumama Stadium and Al Janoub Stadium will be moderately or heavily modified so as to reduce their capacity by half. The Khalifa International Stadium (latter along with the Stadium 974) are the only largely unmodified stadium that were used for this tournament.

=== Host cities and stadiums ===
Locations of the stadiums of the 2022 FIFA World Cup in the Doha metropolitan area and surrounding regions.

List of host cities and stadiums
City	Stadium	Capacity	Image
Al Khor	Al Bayt Stadium	68,895	
Lusail	Lusail Stadium	88,966	
Al Rayyan	Ahmad bin Ali Stadium	45,032	
Al Rayyan	Education City Stadium	44,667	
Al Rayyan	Khalifa International Stadium	45,857	
Doha	Al Thumama Stadium	44,400	
Doha	Stadium 974	44,089	
Al Wakrah	Al Janoub Stadium	44,325	

=== Team base camps ===
Each participating team established a "base camp", where they stayed and trained before and during the tournament. This World Cup was the most compact since the inaugural edition in 1930, with 24 of the 32 teams being within a 10 km radius of each other, and concentrated in the Doha Area. It was the first World Cup since 1930 in which players did not need to take flights to matches, and could remain at the same base camp during the entire tournament.

List
Team	Training site
Argentina	Qatar University Training Site 3
Australia	Aspire Zone Training Facilities 5
Belgium	Salwa Training Site
Brazil	Al Arabi SC Stadium
Cameroon	Al Sailiya SC Stadium
Canada	Umm Salal SC Training Facilities
Costa Rica	Al Ahli SC Stadium
Croatia	Al Ersal Training Site 3
Denmark	Al Sailiya SC 2
Ecuador	Mesaimeer SC Training Facilities
England	Al Wakrah SC Stadium
France	Al Sadd SC Stadium
Germany	Al Shamal SC Stadium
Ghana	Aspire Zone Training Facilities 1
Iran	Al Rayyan SC Training Facilities 1
Japan	Al Sadd SC New Training Facilities 1
Mexico	Al Khor SC Stadium
Morocco	Al Duhail SC Stadium
Netherlands	Qatar University Training Site 6
Poland	Al Kharaitiyat SC Training Facilities
Portugal	Al Shahaniya SC Training Facilities
Qatar	Aspire Zone Training Facilities 3
Saudi Arabia	Sealine Training Site
Senegal	Al Duhail SC 2
Serbia	Al Arabi SC Training Facilities
South Korea	Al Egla Training Site 5
Spain	Qatar University Training Site 1
Switzerland	University of Doha for Science and Technology Training Facilities
Tunisia	Al Egla Training Sites 3
United States	Al Gharafa SC Stadium
Uruguay	Al Ersal Training Site 1
Wales	Al Sadd SC New Training Facilities 2

=== Security ===
The Qatari government employed about 50,000 security personnel, including police departments and military forces. These personnel came from at least thirteen countries, including Poland, Germany, France, Kuwait, Jordan, Italy, Palestine, Spain, Pakistan (4,500 Army troops), Turkey (3,000 riot police personnel), the US, Saudi Arabia and the United Kingdom.

== Teams ==
=== Qualification ===
FIFA's six continental confederations organised their own qualifying competitions. All 211 FIFA member associations were eligible to enter qualification. The Qatari national team, as hosts, qualified automatically for the tournament. They still participated in the Asian qualifying stage as the first two rounds also acted as qualification for the 2023 AFC Asian Cup. Since Qatar reached the final stage as winners in their group, Lebanon, the fifth-best second place team, advanced instead. Qatar were the only team making their debut in the FIFA World Cup, becoming the first hosts to make their tournament debut since Italy in 1934.

Of the 32 nations qualified to play at the 2022 FIFA World Cup, 24 countries competed at the previous tournament in 2018, including France, the reigning World Cup champions, who qualified for the event through European qualification rather than automatically as champions.

==== Debutant and returnees ====
- Qatar were the only team making their debut in the FIFA World Cup, becoming the first hosts to make their tournament debut since Italy in 1934.
- Wales made their first appearance in 64 years, the longest-ever gap for any team; their only previous participation having been in 1958.
- Canada returned after 36 years, their only prior appearance being in 1986.
- The Netherlands, Ecuador, Ghana, Cameroon, and the United States returned to the tournament after missing the 2018 edition.
- Ghana were the lowest ranked team to qualify, ranked 61st.

The qualified teams, listed by region, with numbers in parentheses indicating final positions in the FIFA Men's World Ranking before the tournament were:

AFC (6)

- Australia (38)
- Iran (20)
- Japan (24)
- Qatar (50) (hosts) (debut)
- Saudi Arabia (51)
- South Korea (28)

CAF (5)

- Cameroon (43)
- Ghana (61)
- Morocco (22)
- Senegal (18)
- Tunisia (30)

CONCACAF (4)

- Canada (41)
- Costa Rica (31)
- Mexico (13)
- United States (16)

CONMEBOL (4)

- Argentina (3)
- Brazil (1)
- Ecuador (44)
- Uruguay (14)

OFC (0)

- None qualified

UEFA (13)

- Belgium (2)
- Croatia (12)
- Denmark (10)
- England (5)
- France (4)
- Germany (11)
- Netherlands (8)
- Poland (26)
- Portugal (9)
- Serbia (21)
- Spain (7)
- Switzerland (15)
- Wales (19)

Teams qualified Teams eliminated Teams withdrew or suspended Not a FIFA member

As of 2026, this was the last time Cameroon, Costa Rica, Denmark, Poland, Serbia, and Wales qualified for the World Cup, and the last time Algeria, Austria, Bosnia and Herzegovina, Cape Verde, Colombia, Curaçao, the Czech Republic, DR Congo, Egypt, Haiti, Iraq, Ivory Coast, Jordan, New Zealand, Norway, Panama, Paraguay, Scotland, South Africa, Sweden, Turkey and Uzbekistan failed to qualify.

=== Squads ===
Before submitting their final squad for the tournament, teams named a provisional squad of up to 55 players. Teams were required to have their 55-player roster submitted to FIFA by 21 October. Teams were required to name their final squads by 13 November. In August 2022, FIFA increased the final squad size to 26 players from a total of 23 players at the 2018 World Cup. All teams had a total of 26 players in their final squads except for France and Iran, who chose 25 players.

=== Draw ===
The final draw was held at the Doha Exhibition and Convention Center in Doha, Qatar, on 1 April 2022, 19:00 AST, prior to the completion of qualification. The two winners of the inter-confederation play-offs and the winner of the Path A of the UEFA play-offs were not known at the time of the draw. The draw was attended by 2,000 guests and was led by Carli Lloyd, Jermaine Jenas and sports broadcaster Samantha Johnson, assisted by the likes of Cafu (Brazil), Lothar Matthäus (Germany), Adel Ahmed Malalla (Qatar), Ali Daei (Iran), Bora Milutinović (Serbia/Mexico), Jay-Jay Okocha (Nigeria), Rabah Madjer (Algeria), and Tim Cahill (Australia).

For the draw, 32 teams were allocated into four pots based on the FIFA Men's World Rankings of 31 March 2022. Pot 1 contained host Qatar (who were automatically assigned to position A1) and the best seven teams. Pot 2 contained the next best eight teams, with the next best eight teams into pot 3. Pot 4 contained the five lowest-ranked teams, along with the placeholders for the two inter-confederation play-off winners and the UEFA Path A play-off winner. Teams from the same confederation could not be drawn into the same group except for UEFA teams, for which there was at least one and no more than two per group.

This principle also applied to the placeholder teams, with constraints applying based on the confederation of both potential winners of each play-off tie. The draw started with pot 1 and ended with pot 4, with each team selected then allocated into the first available group alphabetically. The position for the team within the group would then be drawn (for the purpose of the match schedule), with the pot 1 teams automatically drawn into position 1 of each group. The pots for the draw are shown below.

Pots
Pot 1	Pot 2	Pot 3	Pot 4
Qatar (51) (H); Brazil (1); Belgium (2); France (3); Argentina (4); England (5); Spain (7); Portugal (8)	Mexico (9); Netherlands (10); Denmark (11); Germany (12); Uruguay (13); Switzerland (14); United States (15); Croatia (16)	Senegal (20); Iran (21); Japan (23); Morocco (24); Serbia (25); Poland (26); South Korea (29); Tunisia (35)	Cameroon (37); Canada (38); Ecuador (46); Saudi Arabia (49); Ghana (60); UEFA Path A winners (Note: Team not determined at time of draw, as those matches were held in June 2022.); CONCACAF–OFC play-off winners AFC–CONMEBOL play-off winners

Notes

- H : Hosts

==== Draw result ====
The eight groups were formed randomly, selecting one team from each of the four pots. Two teams from the same confederation could not be placed into the same group, with the exception of UEFA teams, where up to two teams could be in the same group. The only team whose position in the draw was predetermined was the host Qatar, who were placed into position A1.

Group A
Pos	Team
A1	Qatar
A2	Ecuador
A3	Senegal
A4	Netherlands

Group E
Pos	Team
E1	Spain
E2	Costa Rica (Note: CONCACAF–OFC play-off winners)
E3	Germany
E4	Japan

Group B
Pos	Team
B1	England
B2	Iran
B3	United States
B4	Wales (Note: UEFA Path A winners)

Group F
Pos	Team
F1	Belgium
F2	Canada
F3	Morocco
F4	Croatia

Group C
Pos	Team
C1	Argentina
C2	Saudi Arabia
C3	Mexico
C4	Poland

Group G
Pos	Team
G1	Brazil
G2	Serbia
G3	Switzerland
G4	Cameroon

Group D
Pos	Team
D1	France
D2	Australia (Note: AFC–CONMEBOL play-off winners)
D3	Denmark
D4	Tunisia

Group H
Pos	Team
H1	Portugal
H2	Ghana
H3	Uruguay
H4	South Korea

== Officiating ==
In May 2022, FIFA announced the list of 36 referees, 69 assistant referees, and 24 video assistant referees for the tournament. Of the 36 referees, FIFA included two each from Argentina, Brazil, England, and France.

For the first time women referees officiated games at a major men's tournament. France's Stéphanie Frappart, Salima Mukansanga from Rwanda, and Yoshimi Yamashita from Japan became the first female referees to be appointed to a men's World Cup. Frappart previously oversaw the 2019 FIFA Women's World Cup final. They were joined by three female assistant referees, Neuza Back, Kathryn Nesbitt, and Karen Díaz Medina. Frappart then officially became the first-ever female referee to officiate a World Cup match when she worked the Costa Rica vs Germany match in Group E on 1 December.

Gambian referee Bakary Gassama and Argentine assistant referee Juan Pablo Belatti were among the officials to serve at their third World Cup. Belatti was an assistant referee in the 2018 final. Other returning officials included referees César Arturo Ramos of Mexico and Janny Sikazwe of Zambia, and Iranian assistant referee Mohammadreza Mansouri.

On 15 December 2022, FIFA announced that Polish referee Szymon Marciniak would adjudicate the final.

== Opening ceremony ==
The opening ceremony took place on Sunday, 20 November 2022 at the Al Bayt Stadium in Al Khor, prior to the opening match of the tournament between hosts Qatar and Ecuador. It included appearances by Morgan Freeman and Ghanim Al-Muftah, along with performances by South Korean singer and BTS member Jungkook and Qatari singer Fahad Al Kubaisi. It was the first time that the Qur'an had been recited as part of the opening ceremony. During the ceremony, Emir Tamim bin Hamad Al Thani declared the tournament open.

== Group stage ==
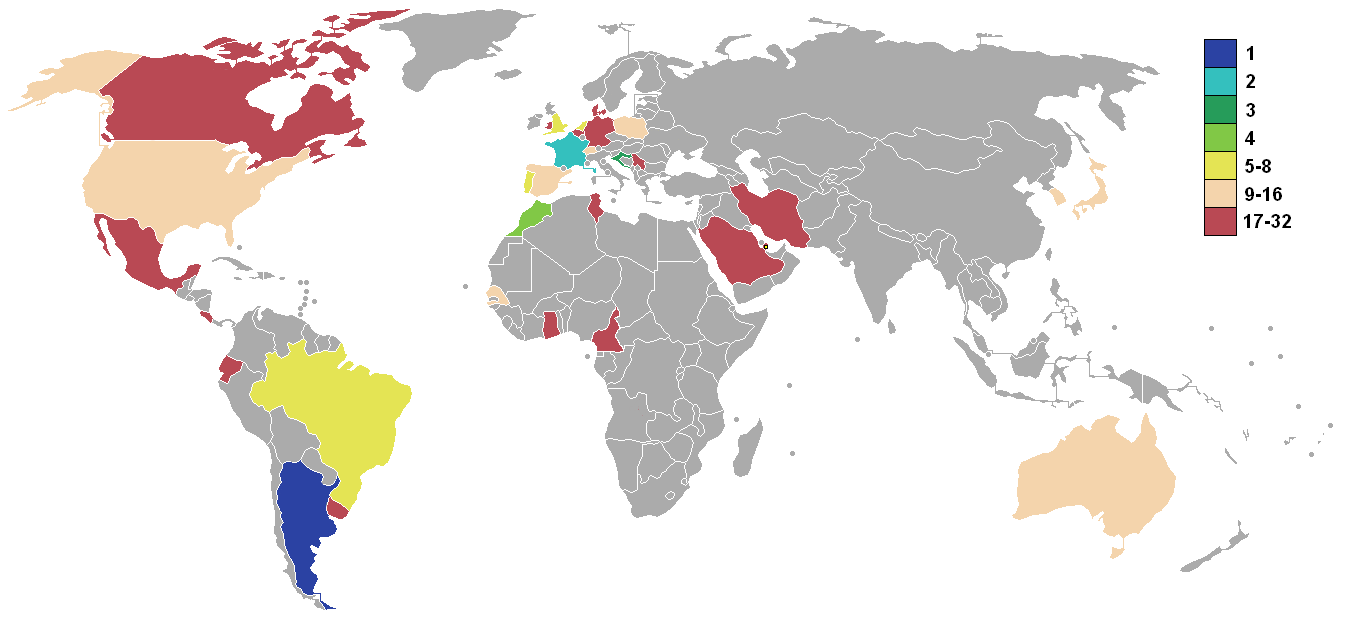
Result of countries participating in the 2022 FIFA World Cup

The group stage was played from 20 November to 2 December. Competing countries were divided into eight groups of four teams (groups A to H). Teams in each group played one another in a round-robin, where the top two teams advanced to the knockout stage.

Tie-breaking criteria for group play
The ranking of teams in the group stage was determined as follows:
1. Points obtained in all group matches;
2. Goal difference in all group matches;
3. Number of goals scored in all group matches;
4. Points obtained in the matches played between the teams in question;
5. Goal difference in the matches played between the teams in question;
6. Number of goals scored in the matches played between the teams in question;
7. Fair play points in all group matches (only one deduction could be applied to a player in a single match):
  - Yellow card: −1 points;
  - Indirect red card (second yellow card): −3 points;
  - Direct red card: −4 points;
  - Yellow card and direct red card: −5 points;
8. Drawing of lots.

=== Group A ===
The first match of the tournament was held between Qatar and Ecuador in Group A. Ecuador had a disallowed goal in the opening minutes, but eventually won 2–0 with two goals from Enner Valencia. Qatar became the first host nation to lose their opening match at a World Cup. Many Qatar natives were seen leaving the game before the end, with ESPN reporting that two-thirds of the attendance had left. The other starting match in group A was won by the Netherlands 2–0 over Senegal. Cody Gakpo scored the opening goal in the 84th minute and Davy Klaassen added a second in stoppage time. Senegal faced Qatar in the third match of the group; Boulaye Dia capitalised on a slip by Boualem Khoukhi to put Senegal 1–0 ahead. Famara Diédhiou scored a second with a header, before Mohammed Muntari scored Qatar's first-ever goal at a World Cup to reduce the deficit back to one. Senegal eventually won the match 3–1 after an 84th-minute goal by Bamba Dieng. With this result, Qatar became the first team to be eliminated from the tournament, as well as becoming the first host nation to ever be knocked out of the tournament after two games. Gakpo scored his second goal of the tournament as the Netherlands led Ecuador; however, Valencia scored an equaliser in the 49th minute. The Netherlands won 2–0 against Qatar following goals by Gakpo and Frenkie de Jong to win the group, while Qatar attained the distinction of being the first home nation to lose all three group matches. Senegal faced Ecuador to determine the second knockout round qualifier. At the end of the first half, Ismaïla Sarr scored a penalty kick to put Senegal ahead. In the 67th minute, Moisés Caicedo scored an equaliser, but shortly after, Kalidou Koulibaly gave Senegal the victory. The win was enough to qualify Senegal as the runners-up of Group A.

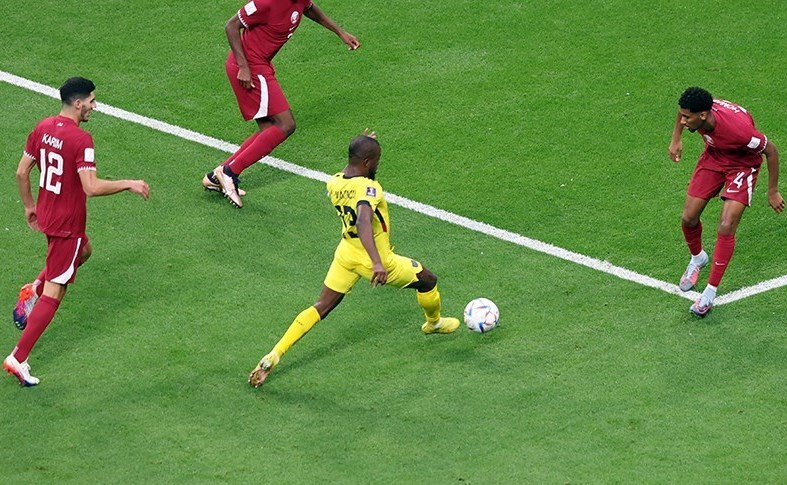
Qatar v Ecuador

Pos	Team	Pld	W	D	L	GF	GA	GD	Pts	Qualification
1	Netherlands	3	2	1	0	5	1	+4	7	Advance to knockout stage
2	Senegal	3	2	0	1	5	4	+1	6	Advance to knockout stage
3	Ecuador	3	1	1	1	4	3	+1	4	
4	Qatar (H)	3	0	0	3	1	7	−6	0	

Source: FIFA
(H) Hosts

20 November 2022
Qatar	0–2	Ecuador	Al Bayt Stadium, Al Khor
21 November 2022
Senegal	0–2	Netherlands	Al Thumama Stadium, Doha
25 November 2022
Qatar	1–3	Senegal	Al Thumama Stadium, Doha
Netherlands	1–1	Ecuador	Khalifa International Stadium, Al Rayyan
29 November 2022
Ecuador	1–2	Senegal	Khalifa International Stadium, Al Rayyan
Netherlands	2–0	Qatar	Al Bayt Stadium, Al Khor

=== Group B ===
Group B began with England completing a 6–2 victory over Iran. Iranian keeper Alireza Beiranvand was removed from the game for a suspected concussion before England scored three first-half goals. Mehdi Taremi scored in the second half after which England defender Harry Maguire was also removed for a concussion. Timothy Weah, of the United States, scored a first-half goal against Wales; however, the match finished as a draw after a penalty kick was won and scored by Gareth Bale. Iran defeated Wales 2–0 following a red card to Welsh goalkeeper Wayne Hennessey after he committed a foul outside of his penalty area. Substitute Rouzbeh Cheshmi scored the first goal eight minutes into stoppage time, followed by Ramin Rezaeian scoring three minutes later. England and the United States played to a 0–0 draw, with only four shots on target between them, and one shot from Christian Pulisic hit the crossbar. England won the group following a 3–0 win over Wales with a goal by Phil Foden and two by Marcus Rashford. With the United States needing no less than a win to advance, Christian Pulisic scored the winning goal while colliding with the opposing goalkeeper as the United States defeated Iran 1–0 to qualify for the round of 16.

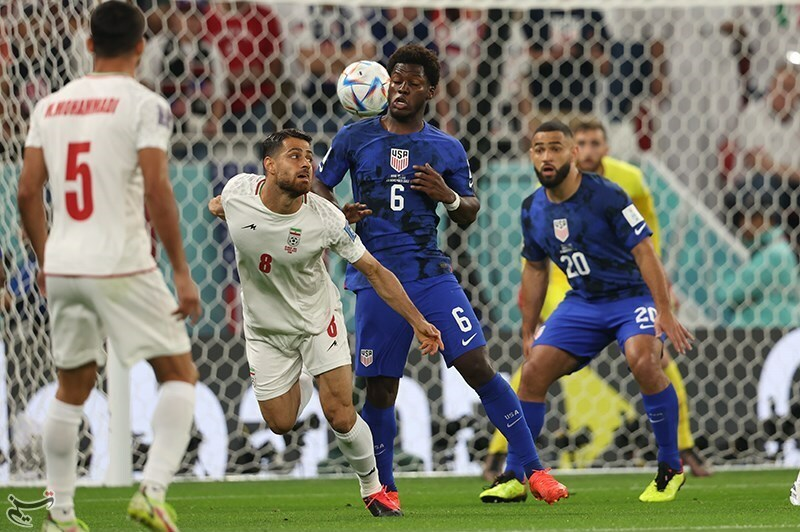
Iran v United States

Pos	Team	Pld	W	D	L	GF	GA	GD	Pts	Qualification
1	England	3	2	1	0	9	2	+7	7	Advance to knockout stage
2	United States	3	1	2	0	2	1	+1	5	Advance to knockout stage
3	Iran	3	1	0	2	4	7	−3	3	
4	Wales	3	0	1	2	1	6	−5	1	

Source: FIFA

21 November 2022
England	6–2	Iran	Khalifa International Stadium, Al Rayyan
United States	1–1	Wales	Ahmad bin Ali Stadium, Al Rayyan
25 November 2022
Wales	0–2	Iran	Ahmad bin Ali Stadium, Al Rayyan
England	0–0	United States	Al Bayt Stadium, Al Khor
29 November 2022
Wales	0–3	England	Ahmad bin Ali Stadium, Al Rayyan
Iran	0–1	United States	Al Thumama Stadium, Doha

=== Group C ===
Argentina took an early lead against Saudi Arabia after Lionel Messi scored a penalty kick after ten minutes; however, second-half goals by Saleh Al-Shehri and Salem Al-Dawsari won the match 2–1 for Saudi Arabia, a result the media considered one of the biggest upsets in the history of the event. The match between Mexico and Poland ended as a goalless 0–0 draw after Guillermo Ochoa saved Robert Lewandowski's penalty kick attempt. Lewandowski scored his first career World Cup goal in a 2–0 win over Saudi Arabia four days later. Argentina defeated Mexico 2–0, with Messi scoring the opener and later assisting teammate Enzo Fernández who scored his first international goal. Argentina won their last game against Poland with goals from Alexis Mac Allister and Julián Álvarez, which was enough to win the group; Poland qualified for the knockout stage on goal difference, thanks to Saudi Arabia scoring an injury-time consolation goal against Mexico in a match already lost.

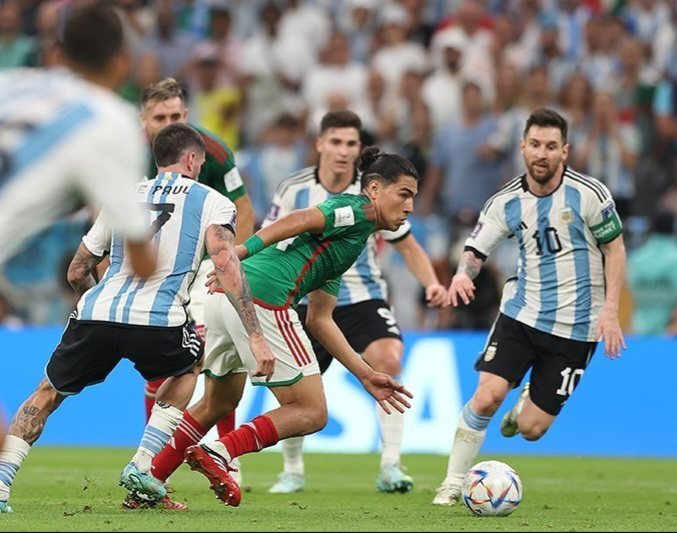
Argentina v Mexico

Pos	Team	Pld	W	D	L	GF	GA	GD	Pts	Qualification
1	Argentina	3	2	0	1	5	2	+3	6	Advance to knockout stage
2	Poland	3	1	1	1	2	2	0	4	Advance to knockout stage
3	Mexico	3	1	1	1	2	3	−1	4	
4	Saudi Arabia	3	1	0	2	3	5	−2	3	

Source: FIFA

22 November 2022
Argentina	1–2	Saudi Arabia	Lusail Stadium, Lusail
Mexico	0–0	Poland	Stadium 974, Doha
26 November 2022
Poland	2–0	Saudi Arabia	Education City Stadium, Al Rayyan
Argentina	2–0	Mexico	Lusail Stadium, Lusail
30 November 2022
Poland	0–2	Argentina	Stadium 974, Doha
Saudi Arabia	1–2	Mexico	Lusail Stadium, Lusail

=== Group D ===
The match between Denmark and Tunisia ended as a goalless draw; both teams had goals disallowed by offside calls. Danish midfielder Christian Eriksen made his first major international appearance since suffering a cardiac arrest at the UEFA Euro 2020. Defending champions France went a goal behind to Australia, after a Craig Goodwin goal within ten minutes. France, however, scored four goals, by Adrien Rabiot, Kylian Mbappé and two by Olivier Giroud to win 4–1. The goals tied Giroud with Thierry Henry as France's all-time top goalscorer. Mitchell Duke scored the only goal as Australia won against Tunisia. This was their first World Cup win since 2010. Mbappé scored a brace as France defeated Denmark 2–1. This was enough for France to qualify for the knockout round—the first time since Brazil in 2006 that the defending champions progressed through the opening round. Mathew Leckie scored the only goal as Australia defeated Denmark 1–0, qualifying for the knockout round as runners-up with the win. Wahbi Khazri scored for Tunisia against France in the 58th minute. Although Antoine Griezmann equalised in stoppage time it was overturned for offside. Tunisia finished third in the group, as they required a draw in the Denmark and Australia game.

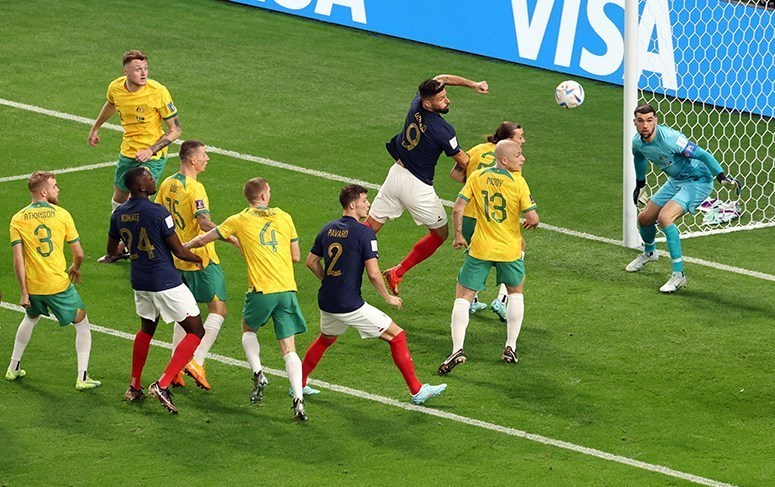
France v Australia

Pos	Team	Pld	W	D	L	GF	GA	GD	Pts	Qualification
1	France	3	2	0	1	6	3	+3	6	Advance to knockout stage
2	Australia	3	2	0	1	3	4	−1	6	Advance to knockout stage
3	Tunisia	3	1	1	1	1	1	0	4	
4	Denmark	3	0	1	2	1	3	−2	1	

Source: FIFA

22 November 2022
Denmark	0–0	Tunisia	Education City Stadium, Al Rayyan
France	4–1	Australia	Al Janoub Stadium, Al Wakrah
26 November 2022
Tunisia	0–1	Australia	Al Janoub Stadium, Al Wakrah
France	2–1	Denmark	Stadium 974, Doha
30 November 2022
Australia	1–0	Denmark	Al Janoub Stadium, Al Wakrah
Tunisia	1–0	France	Education City Stadium, Al Rayyan

=== Group E ===
Group E began with Japan facing 2014 champions Germany. After an early penalty kick was converted by Germany's İlkay Gündoğan, Japan scored two second-half goals by Ritsu Dōan and Takuma Asano in a 2–1 win. In the second group match, Spain defeated Costa Rica 7–0. First-half goals by Dani Olmo, Marco Asensio, and Ferran Torres were followed by goals by Gavi, Carlos Soler, Alvaro Morata, and a second by Torres. This was the largest defeat in a World Cup since Portugal's victory over North Korea in the 2010 event by the same scoreline. Costa Rica defeated Japan 1–0, with Keysher Fuller scoring with Costa Rica's first shot on target of the tournament. Germany and Spain drew 1–1, with Álvaro Morata scoring for Spain and Niclas Füllkrug scoring for Germany. Morata scored the opening goal for Spain against Japan as they controlled the first half of the match. Japan equalised on Ritsu Doan before a second goal by Ao Tanaka was heavily investigated by VAR for the ball potentially being out of play. The goal was awarded, and Japan won the group following a 2–1 win. Disputes over the VAR's call was only settled when the Associated Press released an iconic bird's eye photo of the ball after the match. Serge Gnabry scored on ten minutes for Germany against Costa Rica and they led until half-time. Germany required a win, and for Japan to not win their match, or for both teams to win their matches by a combined goal difference of at least 9 goals, to qualify. In the second half, goals by Yeltsin Tejeda and Juan Vargas gave Costa Rica a 2–1 lead, which would have qualified them into the knockout stages ahead of Spain despite the heavy earlier defeat. Germany scored three further goals—two by Kai Havertz and a goal by Niclas Füllkrug, ending in a 4–2 win for Germany—which was not enough to qualify them for the final stages. This was the second time in a row that the four-time champions failed to progress past the group stages. Japan won the group ahead of Spain.

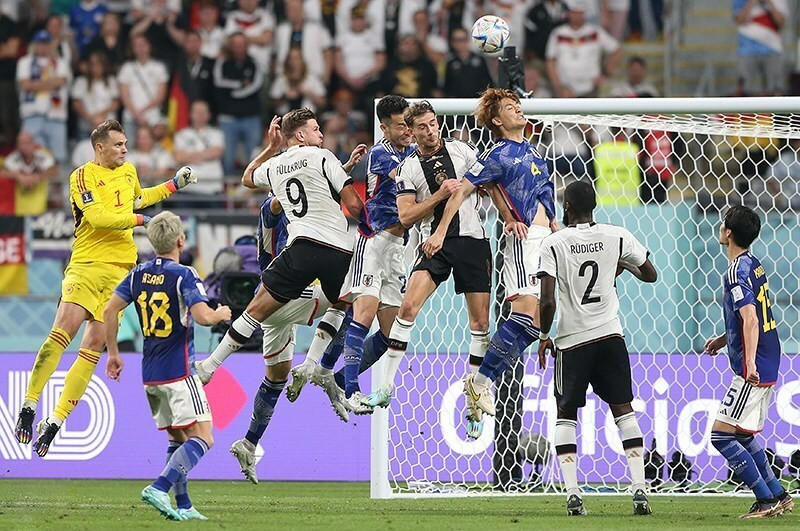
Germany v Japan

Pos	Team	Pld	W	D	L	GF	GA	GD	Pts	Qualification
1	Japan	3	2	0	1	4	3	+1	6	Advance to knockout stage
2	Spain	3	1	1	1	9	3	+6	4	Advance to knockout stage
3	Germany	3	1	1	1	6	5	+1	4	
4	Costa Rica	3	1	0	2	3	11	−8	3	

Source: FIFA

23 November 2022
Germany	1–2	Japan	Khalifa International Stadium, Al Rayyan
Spain	7–0	Costa Rica	Al Thumama Stadium, Doha
27 November 2022
Japan	0–1	Costa Rica	Ahmad bin Ali Stadium, Al Rayyan
Spain	1–1	Germany	Al Bayt Stadium, Al Khor
1 December 2022
Japan	2–1	Spain	Khalifa International Stadium, Al Rayyan
Costa Rica	2–4	Germany	Al Bayt Stadium, Al Khor

=== Group F ===
Group F's first match was a goalless draw between Morocco and Croatia. Canada had a penalty kick in the first half of their match against Belgium which was saved by Thibaut Courtois. Belgium won the match by a single goal by Michy Batshuayi. Belgium lost 2–0 to Morocco, despite Morocco having a long-range direct free kick goal by Hakim Ziyech overturned for an offside on another player in the lead up to the goal. Two second-half goals from Zakaria Aboukhlal and Romain Saïss helped the Morocco win their first World Cup match since 1998. The match sparked riots in Belgium, with fires and fireworks being set off by residents. Alphonso Davies scored Canada's first World Cup goal to give Canada the lead over Croatia. Goals by Marko Livaja, Lovro Majer, and two by Andrej Kramarić for Croatia completed a 4–1 victory. Morocco scored two early goals through Hakim Ziyech and Youssef En-Nesyri in their game against Canada and qualified following a 2–1 victory. Canada's only goal was an own goal by Nayef Aguerd. Croatia and Belgium played a goalless draw which eliminated Belgium, whose team was ranked second in the world, from the tournament.

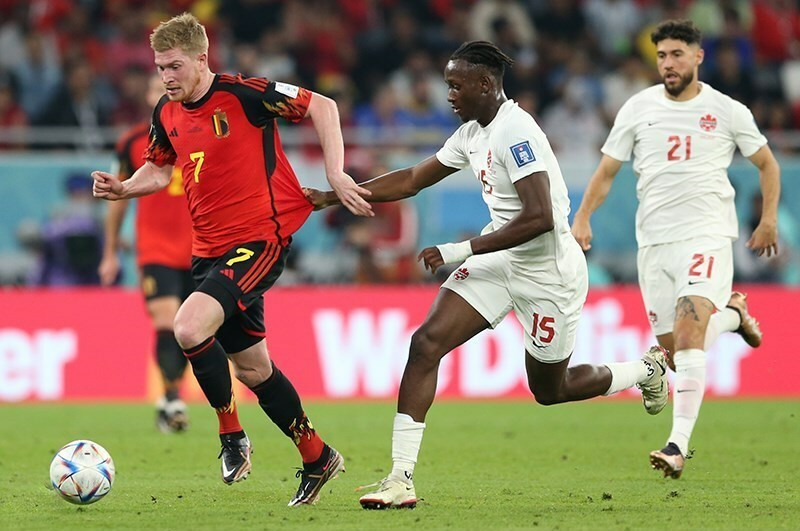
Belgium v Canada

Pos	Team	Pld	W	D	L	GF	GA	GD	Pts	Qualification
1	Morocco	3	2	1	0	4	1	+3	7	Advance to knockout stage
2	Croatia	3	1	2	0	4	1	+3	5	Advance to knockout stage
3	Belgium	3	1	1	1	1	2	−1	4	
4	Canada	3	0	0	3	2	7	−5	0	

Source: FIFA

23 November 2022
Morocco	0–0	Croatia	Al Bayt Stadium, Al Khor
Belgium	1–0	Canada	Ahmad bin Ali Stadium, Al Rayyan
27 November 2022
Belgium	0–2	Morocco	Al Thumama Stadium, Doha
Croatia	4–1	Canada	Khalifa International Stadium, Al Rayyan
1 December 2022
Croatia	0–0	Belgium	Ahmad bin Ali Stadium, Al Rayyan
Canada	1–2	Morocco	Al Thumama Stadium, Doha

=== Group G ===
Breel Embolo scored the only goal in Switzerland's 1–0 defeat of Cameroon. Richarlison scored two goals as Brazil won against Serbia, with star player Neymar receiving an ankle injury. Cameroon's Jean-Charles Castelletto scored the opening goal against Serbia, but they were quickly behind as Serbia scored three goals by Strahinja Pavlović, Sergej Milinković-Savić, and Aleksandar Mitrović either side of half time. Cameroon, however, scored goals through Vincent Aboubakar and Eric Maxim Choupo-Moting, completing a 3–3 draw. An 83rd-minute winner by Casemiro for Brazil over Switzerland was enough for them to qualify for the knockout stage. Having already qualified, Brazil were unable to win their final group game, as they were defeated by Cameroon 1–0 following a goal by Vincent Aboubakar. Already having a yellow card, he was later sent off for removing his shirt in celebrating the goal. Cameroon, however, did not qualify, as Switzerland defeated Serbia 3–2.

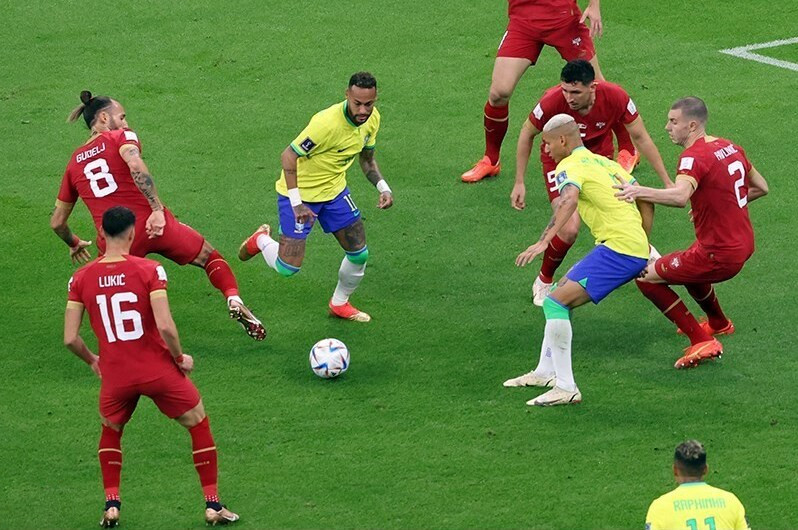
Brazil v Serbia

Pos	Team	Pld	W	D	L	GF	GA	GD	Pts	Qualification
1	Brazil	3	2	0	1	3	1	+2	6	Advance to knockout stage
2	Switzerland	3	2	0	1	4	3	+1	6	Advance to knockout stage
3	Cameroon	3	1	1	1	4	4	0	4	
4	Serbia	3	0	1	2	5	8	−3	1	

Source: FIFA

24 November 2022
Switzerland	1–0	Cameroon	Al Janoub Stadium, Al Wakrah
Brazil	2–0	Serbia	Lusail Stadium, Lusail
28 November 2022
Cameroon	3–3	Serbia	Al Janoub Stadium, Al Wakrah
Brazil	1–0	Switzerland	Stadium 974, Doha
2 December 2022
Serbia	2–3	Switzerland	Stadium 974, Doha
Cameroon	1–0	Brazil	Lusail Stadium, Lusail

=== Group H ===
Uruguay and South Korea played to a goalless draw. A goalless first half between Portugal and Ghana preceded a penalty converted by Cristiano Ronaldo to give Portugal the lead. In scoring the goal, Ronaldo became the first man to score in five World Cups. Ghana responded with a goal by André Ayew before goals by João Félix, and Rafael Leão by Portugal put them 3–1 ahead. Osman Bukari scored in the 89th minute to trail by a single goal, while Iñaki Williams had a chance to equalise for Ghana ten minutes into stoppage time, but slipped before shooting. The match finished 3–2 to Portugal. Ghanaian Mohammed Salisu opened the scoring against South Korea, with Mohammed Kudus following it up. In the second half, Cho Gue-sung scored a brace for South Korea, levelling the score. Mohammed Kudus scored again in the 68th minute, winning the match 3–2 for Ghana. Portugal defeated Uruguay 2–0 with two goals from Bruno Fernandes, advancing them to the knockout stage. A controversial penalty decision was called late in the game, with a suspected handball from José María Giménez. Portugal led South Korea through Ricardo Horta after 10 minutes. However, goals by Kim Young-gwon and Hwang Hee-chan won the match 2–1 for South Korea. Giorgian de Arrascaeta scored two goals as Uruguay defeated Ghana 2–0. However, with South Korea winning, Uruguay required another goal to progress as they finished third on goals scored. Several Uruguay players left the pitch after the game surrounding the referees and followed them off the pitch.

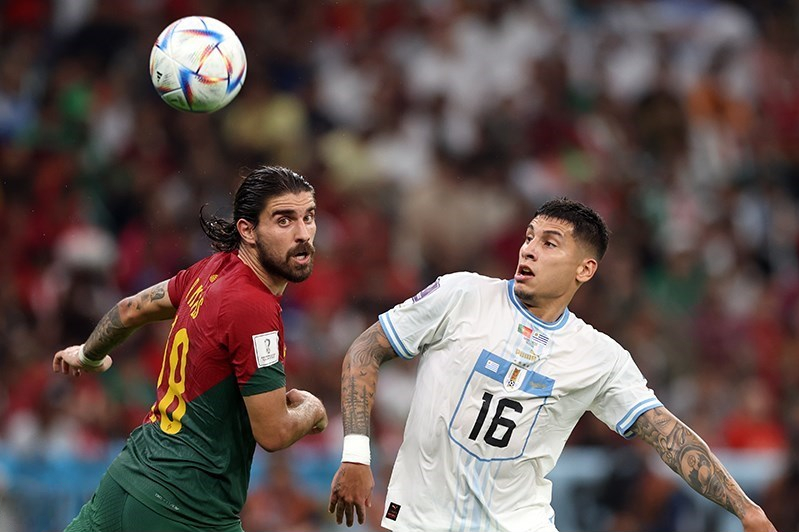
Portugal v Uruguay

Pos	Team	Pld	W	D	L	GF	GA	GD	Pts	Qualification
1	Portugal	3	2	0	1	6	4	+2	6	Advance to knockout stage
2	South Korea	3	1	1	1	4	4	0	4	Advance to knockout stage
3	Uruguay	3	1	1	1	2	2	0	4	
4	Ghana	3	1	0	2	5	7	−2	3	

Source: FIFA

24 November 2022
Uruguay	0–0	South Korea	Education City Stadium, Al Rayyan
Portugal	3–2	Ghana	Stadium 974, Doha
28 November 2022
South Korea	2–3	Ghana	Education City Stadium, Al Rayyan
Portugal	2–0	Uruguay	Lusail Stadium, Lusail
2 December 2022
Ghana	0–2	Uruguay	Al Janoub Stadium, Al Wakrah
South Korea	2–1	Portugal	Education City Stadium, Al Rayyan

== Knockout stage ==
In the knockout stage, if the scores were equal when normal playing time expired, extra time was played for two periods of 15 minutes each. This was followed, if required, by a penalty shoot-out to determine the winners.

=== Bracket ===
Round of 16
3 December – Al Rayyan (Khalifa)
Netherlands	3
United States	1
3 December – Al Rayyan (Ahmad bin Ali)
Argentina	2
Australia	1
5 December – Al Wakrah
Japan	1 (1)
Croatia (p)	1 (3)
5 December – Doha (974)
Brazil	4
South Korea	1
4 December – Al Khor
England	3
Senegal	0
4 December – Doha (Al Thumama)
France	3
Poland	1
6 December – Al Rayyan (Education City)
Morocco (p)	0 (3)
Spain	0 (0)
6 December – Lusail
Portugal	6
Switzerland	1

Quarter-finals
9 December – Lusail
Netherlands	2 (3)
Argentina (p)	2 (4)
9 December – Al Rayyan (Education City)
Croatia (p)	1 (4)
Brazil	1 (2)
10 December – Al Khor
England	1
France	2
10 December – Doha (Al Thumama)
Morocco	1
Portugal	0

Semi-finals
13 December – Lusail
Argentina	3
Croatia	0
14 December – Al Khor
France	2
Morocco	0

Final
18 December – Lusail
Argentina (p)	3 (4)
France	3 (2)
Match for third place
17 December – Al Rayyan (Khalifa)
Croatia	2
Morocco	1

=== Round of 16 ===
The round of 16 was played from 3 to 7 December, which for the first time ever included teams from each of the six inhabited continents. Group A winners Netherlands scored goals through Memphis Depay, Daley Blind, and Denzel Dumfries as they defeated the United States 3–1, with Haji Wright scoring for the United States. Messi scored his third of the tournament alongside Julián Álvarez to give Argentina a two-goal lead over Australia, and despite an Enzo Fernández own goal from a Craig Goodwin shot, Argentina won 2–1. Olivier Giroud's goal and Mbappé's brace enabled France to have a 3–1 victory over Poland, with Robert Lewandowski scoring the lone goal for Poland from a penalty. England beat Senegal 3–0, with goals coming from Jordan Henderson, Harry Kane, and Bukayo Saka. Daizen Maeda scored for Japan against Croatia in the first half before a leveller from Ivan Perišić in the second. Neither team could find the winner, with Croatia defeating Japan 3–1 in a penalty shoot-out. Vinícius Júnior, Neymar, Richarlison, and Lucas Paquetá all scored for Brazil, but a volley from South Korean Paik Seung-ho reduced the deficit to 4–1. Pablo Sarabia had the best chance for Spain to break the deadlock against Morocco in stoppage time after two goalless hours, but he hit the goalie's right-hand post after a shot from the left; Morocco won the match 3–0 on penalties. A hat-trick by Gonçalo Ramos led Portugal to defeat Switzerland 6–1, with goals from Portugal's Pepe, Raphaël Guerreiro, and Rafael Leão and from Switzerland's Manuel Akanji.

3 December 2022
18:00

Netherlands	3–1	United States
Depay 10'; Blind 45+1'; Dumfries 81'		Wright 76'

Khalifa International Stadium, Al Rayyan
Attendance: 44,846
Referee: Wilton Sampaio (Brazil)

3 December 2022
22:00

Argentina	2–1	Australia
Messi 35'; Alvarez 57'		Fernández 77' (o.g.)

Ahmad bin Ali Stadium, Al Rayyan
Attendance: 45,032
Referee: Szymon Marciniak (Poland)

4 December 2022
18:00

France	3–1	Poland
Giroud 44'; Mbappé 74', 90+1'		Lewandowski 90+9' (pen.)

Al Thumama Stadium, Doha
Attendance: 40,989
Referee: Jesús Valenzuela (Venezuela)

4 December 2022
22:00

England	3–0	Senegal
Henderson 38'; Kane 45+3'; Saka 57'

Al Bayt Stadium, Al Khor
Attendance: 65,985
Referee: Iván Barton (El Salvador)

5 December 2022
18:00

Japan	1–1 (a.e.t.)	Croatia
Maeda 43'		Perišić 55'
Penalties
Minamino (penalty missed); Mitoma (penalty missed); Asano (penalty scored); Yoshida (penalty missed)	1–3	(penalty scored) Vlašić; (penalty scored) Brozović; (penalty missed) Livaja; (penalty scored) Pašalić

Al Janoub Stadium, Al Wakrah
Attendance: 42,523
Referee: Ismail Elfath (United States)

5 December 2022
22:00

Brazil	4–1	South Korea
Vinícius 7'; Neymar 13' (pen.); Richarlison 29'; Paquetá 36'		Paik Seung-ho 76'

Stadium 974, Doha
Attendance: 43,847
Referee: Clément Turpin (France)

6 December 2022
18:00

Morocco	0–0 (a.e.t.)	Spain
Penalties
Sabiri (penalty scored); Ziyech (penalty scored); Benoun (penalty missed); Hakimi (penalty scored)	3–0	(penalty missed) Sarabia; (penalty missed) Soler; (penalty missed) Busquets

Education City Stadium, Al Rayyan
Attendance: 44,667
Referee: Fernando Rapallini (Argentina)

6 December 2022
22:00

Portugal	6–1	Switzerland
Ramos 17', 51', 67'; Pepe 33'; Guerreiro 55'; Leão 90+2'		Akanji 58'

Lusail Stadium, Lusail
Attendance: 83,720
Referee: César Arturo Ramos (Mexico)

=== Quarter-finals ===
The quarter-finals were played on 9 and 10 December. Croatia and Brazil ended 0–0 after 90 minutes and went to extra time. Neymar scored for Brazil in the 15th minute of extra time. Croatia, however, equalised through Bruno Petković in the second period of extra time. With the match tied, a penalty shoot-out decided the contest, with Croatia winning the shoot-out 4–2. The second quarter-final match, between Argentina and the Netherlands, later dubbed as the Battle of Lusail saw Nahuel Molina and Messi score for Argentina before Wout Weghorst equalised with two goals shortly before the end of the game. The match went to extra time and then penalties, where Argentina would go on to win 4–3. Morocco defeated Portugal 1–0, with Youssef En-Nesyri scoring at the end of the first half. Morocco became the first African and the first Arab nation to advance as far as the semi-finals of the competition. Despite Harry Kane scoring a penalty for England, it was not enough to beat France, who won 2–1 by virtue of goals from Aurélien Tchouaméni and Olivier Giroud and a late missed penalty by Kane, sending them to their second consecutive World Cup semi-final and becoming the first defending champions to reach this stage since Brazil in 1998.

9 December 2022
18:00

Croatia	1–1 (a.e.t.)	Brazil
Petković 117'		Neymar 105+1'
Penalties
Vlašić (penalty scored); Majer (penalty scored); Modrić (penalty scored); Oršić (penalty scored)	4–2	(penalty missed) Rodrygo; (penalty scored) Casemiro; (penalty scored) Pedro; (penalty missed) Marquinhos

Education City Stadium, Al Rayyan
Attendance: 43,893
Referee: Michael Oliver (England)

9 December 2022
22:00

Netherlands	2–2 (a.e.t.)	Argentina
Weghorst 83', 90+11'		Molina 35'; Messi 73' (pen.)
Penalties
Van Dijk (penalty missed); Berghuis (penalty missed); Koopmeiners (penalty scored); Weghorst (penalty scored); L. de Jong (penalty scored)	3–4	(penalty scored) Messi; (penalty scored) Paredes; (penalty scored) Montiel; (penalty missed) Fernández; (penalty scored) La. Martínez

Lusail Stadium, Lusail
Attendance: 88,235
Referee: Antonio Mateu Lahoz (Spain)

10 December 2022
18:00

Morocco	1–0	Portugal
En-Nesyri 42'

Al Thumama Stadium, Doha
Attendance: 44,198
Referee: Facundo Tello (Argentina)

10 December 2022
22:00

England	1–2	France
Kane 54' (pen.)		Tchouaméni 17'; Giroud 78'

Al Bayt Stadium, Al Khor
Attendance: 68,895
Referee: Wilton Sampaio (Brazil)

=== Semi-finals ===
The semi-finals were played on 13 and 14 December. Messi scored a penalty kick before Julián Álvarez scored twice to give Argentina a 3–0 victory over Croatia. Théo Hernandez scored after five minutes as France led Morocco for most of the game. Randal Kolo Muani scored in the 78th minute to complete a 2–0 victory for France over Morocco as they reached their second consecutive final.

13 December 2022
22:00

Argentina	3–0	Croatia
Messi 34' (pen.); Alvarez 39', 69'

Lusail Stadium, Lusail
Attendance: 88,966
Referee: Daniele Orsato (Italy)

14 December 2022
22:00

France	2–0	Morocco
T. Hernandez 5'; Kolo Muani 79'

Al Bayt Stadium, Al Khor
Attendance: 68,294
Referee: César Arturo Ramos (Mexico)

=== Match for third place ===
The match for third place was played on 17 December. The two teams had played against each other in their opening game in Group F which finished 0–0. Joško Gvardiol promptly scored for Croatia, with Achraf Dari equalising just 2 minutes later. Mislav Oršić scored the winner for Croatia as the match finished 2–1. Morocco earned 4th place, a record for the team and the best World Cup finish of any African or Arab nation.

17 December 2022
18:00

Croatia	2–1	Morocco
Gvardiol 7'; Oršić 42'		Dari 9'

Khalifa International Stadium, Al Rayyan
Attendance: 44,137
Referee: Abdulrahman Al-Jassim (Qatar)

=== Final ===
The final was played on 18 December between Argentina and France. Both teams had won the event twice previously. Early goals from Lionel Messi and Ángel Di María gave Argentina a 2–0 lead against the French. Despite substitutions in the first half, France did not record a shot until after the 70th minute but were energised by additional substitutions in the 71st. A few minutes later, France were awarded a penalty as Randal Kolo Muani was brought down in the penalty area by Nicolás Otamendi. Mbappé scored the penalty and added a second goal less than two minutes later to equalise the scores. With the score tied at two goals apiece, the match went to extra time. Messi scored his second goal in the 108th minute, once again giving Argentina the lead. However, Mbappé was awarded a second penalty in the 115th minute after his shot hit the arm of Gonzalo Montiel. Mbappé scored his third goal, becoming the second player ever to complete a hat-trick in the final of a World Cup after Geoff Hurst for England in 1966. With the score tied at 3–3, the match was determined via a penalty shoot-out. Argentina won the final after scoring all of their penalties, winning 4–2. This marked their third World Cup win and their first since 1986, and also the second team (after Spain in 2010) to win the tournament after having lost their opening game.

18 December 2022
18:00

Argentina	3–3 (a.e.t.)	France
Messi 23' (pen.), 108'; Di María 36'		Mbappé 80' (pen.), 81', 118' (pen.)
Penalties
Messi (penalty scored); Dybala (penalty scored); Paredes (penalty scored); Montiel (penalty scored)	4–2	(penalty scored) Mbappé; (penalty missed) Coman; (penalty missed) Tchouaméni; (penalty scored) Kolo Muani

Lusail Stadium, Lusail
Attendance: 88,966
Referee: Szymon Marciniak (Poland)

== Statistics ==
=== Goalscorers ===
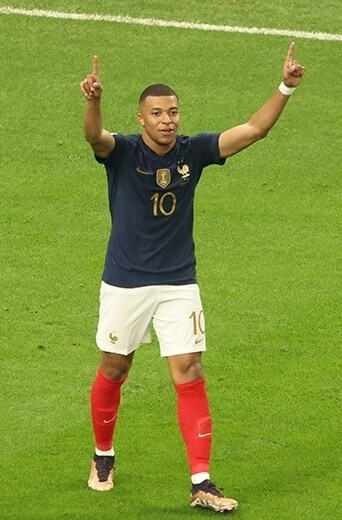
France forward Kylian Mbappé won the Golden Boot award after scoring eight goals in the tournament, the most since Ronaldo in 2002.

There were 172 goals scored in 64 matches, for an average of 2.69 goals per match.

Two own goals were scored throughout the tournament.

This was the most goals ever scored at a FIFA World Cup.

8 goals

- (France national football team) Kylian Mbappé

7 goals

- (Argentina national football team) Lionel Messi

4 goals

- (Argentina national football team) Julián Álvarez
- (France national football team) Olivier Giroud

3 goals

- (Brazil national football team) Richarlison
- (Ecuador national football team) Enner Valencia
- (England national football team) Marcus Rashford
- (England national football team) Bukayo Saka
- (Netherlands national football team) Cody Gakpo
- (Portugal national football team) Gonçalo Ramos
- (Spain national football team) Álvaro Morata

2 goals

- (Brazil national football team) Neymar
- (Cameroon national football team) Vincent Aboubakar
- (Croatia national football team) Andrej Kramarić
- (England national football team) Harry Kane
- (Germany national football team) Niclas Füllkrug
- (Germany national football team) Kai Havertz
- (Ghana national football team) Mohammed Kudus
- (Iran national football team) Mehdi Taremi
- (Japan national football team) Ritsu Dōan
- (Morocco national football team) Youssef En-Nesyri
- (Netherlands national football team) Wout Weghorst
- (Poland national football team) Robert Lewandowski
- (Portugal national football team) Bruno Fernandes
- (Portugal national football team) Rafael Leão
- (Saudi Arabia national football team) Salem Al-Dawsari
- (Serbia national football team) Aleksandar Mitrović
- (South Korea national football team) Cho Gue-sung
- (Spain national football team) Ferran Torres
- (Switzerland national football team) Breel Embolo
- (Uruguay national football team) Giorgian de Arrascaeta

1 goal

- (Argentina national football team) Ángel Di María
- (Argentina national football team) Enzo Fernández
- (Argentina national football team) Alexis Mac Allister
- (Argentina national football team) Nahuel Molina
- (Australia men's national soccer team) Mitchell Duke
- (Australia men's national soccer team) Craig Goodwin
- (Australia men's national soccer team) Mathew Leckie
- (Belgium national football team) Michy Batshuayi
- (Brazil national football team) Casemiro
- (Brazil national football team) Lucas Paquetá
- (Brazil national football team) Vinícius Júnior
- (Cameroon national football team) Jean-Charles Castelletto
- (Cameroon national football team) Eric Maxim Choupo-Moting
- (Canada men's national soccer team) Alphonso Davies
- (Costa Rica national football team) Keysher Fuller
- (Costa Rica national football team) Yeltsin Tejeda
- (Costa Rica national football team) Juan Pablo Vargas
- (Croatia national football team) Joško Gvardiol
- (Croatia national football team) Marko Livaja
- (Croatia national football team) Lovro Majer
- (Croatia national football team) Mislav Oršić
- (Croatia national football team) Ivan Perišić
- (Croatia national football team) Bruno Petković
- (Denmark national football team) Andreas Christensen
- (Ecuador national football team) Moisés Caicedo
- (England national football team) Jude Bellingham
- (England national football team) Phil Foden
- (England national football team) Jack Grealish
- (England national football team) Jordan Henderson
- (England national football team) Raheem Sterling
- (France national football team) Théo Hernandez
- (France national football team) Randal Kolo Muani
- (France national football team) Adrien Rabiot
- (France national football team) Aurélien Tchouaméni
- (Germany national football team) Serge Gnabry
- (Germany national football team) İlkay Gündoğan
- (Ghana national football team) André Ayew
- (Ghana national football team) Osman Bukari
- (Ghana national football team) Mohammed Salisu
- (Iran national football team) Rouzbeh Cheshmi
- (Iran national football team) Ramin Rezaeian
- (Japan national football team) Takuma Asano
- (Japan national football team) Daizen Maeda
- (Japan national football team) Ao Tanaka
- (Mexico national football team) Luis Chávez
- (Mexico national football team) Henry Martín
- (Morocco national football team) Zakaria Aboukhlal
- (Morocco national football team) Achraf Dari
- (Morocco national football team) Romain Saïss
- (Morocco national football team) Hakim Ziyech
- (Netherlands national football team) Daley Blind
- (Netherlands national football team) Memphis Depay
- (Netherlands national football team) Denzel Dumfries
- (Netherlands national football team) Frenkie de Jong
- (Netherlands national football team) Davy Klaassen
- (Poland national football team) Piotr Zieliński
- (Portugal national football team) João Félix
- (Portugal national football team) Raphaël Guerreiro
- (Portugal national football team) Ricardo Horta
- (Portugal national football team) Pepe
- (Portugal national football team) Cristiano Ronaldo
- (Qatar national football team) Mohammed Muntari
- (Saudi Arabia national football team) Saleh Al-Shehri
- (Senegal national football team) Boulaye Dia
- (Senegal national football team) Famara Diédhiou
- (Senegal national football team) Bamba Dieng
- (Senegal national football team) Kalidou Koulibaly
- (Senegal national football team) Ismaïla Sarr
- (Serbia national football team) Sergej Milinković-Savić
- (Serbia national football team) Strahinja Pavlović
- (Serbia national football team) Dušan Vlahović
- (South Korea national football team) Hwang Hee-chan
- (South Korea national football team) Kim Young-gwon
- (South Korea national football team) Paik Seung-ho
- (Spain national football team) Marco Asensio
- (Spain national football team) Gavi
- (Spain national football team) Dani Olmo
- (Spain national football team) Carlos Soler
- (Switzerland national football team) Manuel Akanji
- (Switzerland national football team) Remo Freuler
- (Switzerland national football team) Xherdan Shaqiri
- (Tunisia national football team) Wahbi Khazri
- (United States men's national soccer team) Christian Pulisic
- (United States men's national soccer team) Timothy Weah
- (United States men's national soccer team) Haji Wright
- (Wales national football team) Gareth Bale

1 own goal

- (Argentina national football team) Enzo Fernández (against Australia)
- (Morocco national football team) Nayef Aguerd (against Canada)

=== Discipline ===
A player was automatically suspended for the next match for the following offences:

- Receiving a red card (red card suspensions could be extended for serious offences)
- Receiving two yellow cards in two matches; yellow cards expired after the completion of the quarter-finals (yellow card suspensions were not carried forward to any other future international matches)

The following suspensions were served during the tournament:

Player	Offence(s)	Suspension(s)
(Ecuador) Jhegson Méndez	(yellow card) in Group A vs Qatar (matchday 1; 20 November); (yellow card) in Group A vs Netherlands (matchday 2; 25 November)	Group A vs Senegal (matchday 3; 29 November)
(Wales) Wayne Hennessey	(red card) in Group B vs Iran (matchday 2; 25 November)	Group B vs England (matchday 3; 29 November)
(Iran) Alireza Jahanbakhsh	(yellow card) in Group B vs England (matchday 1; 21 November); (yellow card) in Group B vs Wales (matchday 2; 25 November)	Group B vs United States (matchday 3; 29 November)
(Saudi Arabia) Abdulellah Al-Malki	(yellow card) in Group C vs Argentina (matchday 1; 22 November); (yellow card) in Group C vs Poland (matchday 2; 26 November)	Group C vs Mexico (matchday 3; 30 November)
(Costa Rica) Francisco Calvo	(yellow card) in Group E vs Spain (matchday 1; 23 November); (yellow card) in Group E vs Japan (matchday 2; 27 November)	Group E vs Germany (matchday 3; 1 December)
(Belgium) Amadou Onana	(yellow card) in Group F vs Canada (matchday 1; 23 November); (yellow card) in Group F vs Morocco (matchday 2; 27 November)	Group F vs Croatia (matchday 3; 1 December)
(Cameroon) Vincent Aboubakar	(yellow card) (yellow-red card) in Group G vs Brazil (matchday 3; 2 December)	Suspension served outside tournament
(Senegal) Idrissa Gueye	(yellow card) in Group A vs Netherlands (matchday 1; 21 November); (yellow card) in Group A vs Ecuador (matchday 3; 29 November)	Round of 16 vs England (4 December)
(Japan) Kō Itakura	(yellow card) in Group E vs Costa Rica (matchday 2; 27 November); (yellow card) in Group E vs Spain (matchday 3; 1 December)	Round of 16 vs Croatia (5 December)
(Argentina) Marcos Acuña	(yellow card) in Group C vs Poland (matchday 3; 30 November); (yellow card) in Quarter-finals vs Netherlands (9 December)	Semi-finals vs Croatia (13 December)
(Argentina) Gonzalo Montiel	(yellow card) in Group C vs Mexico (matchday 2; 26 November); (yellow card) in Quarter-finals vs Netherlands (9 December)	Semi-finals vs Croatia (13 December)
(Netherlands) Denzel Dumfries	(yellow card) (yellow-red card) in Quarter-finals vs Argentina (9 December)	Suspension served outside tournament
(Morocco) Walid Cheddira	(yellow card) (yellow-red card) in Quarter-finals vs Portugal (10 December)	Semi-finals vs France (14 December)

=== Tournament ranking ===
Per statistical convention in football, matches decided in extra time are counted as wins and losses, while matches decided by penalty shoot-outs are counted as draws.

Pos	Grp	Team	Pld	W	D	L	GF	GA	GD	Pts	Final result
1	C	Argentina	7	4	2	1	15	8	+7	14	Champions
2	D	France	7	5	1	1	16	8	+8	16	Runners-up
3	F	Croatia	7	2	4	1	8	7	+1	10	Third place
4	F	Morocco	7	3	2	2	6	5	+1	11	Fourth place
5	A	Netherlands	5	3	2	0	10	4	+6	11	Eliminated in quarter-finals
6	B	England	5	3	1	1	13	4	+9	10	Eliminated in quarter-finals
7	G	Brazil	5	3	1	1	8	3	+5	10	Eliminated in quarter-finals
8	H	Portugal	5	3	0	2	12	6	+6	9	Eliminated in quarter-finals
9	E	Japan	4	2	1	1	5	4	+1	7	Eliminated in round of 16
10	A	Senegal	4	2	0	2	5	7	−2	6	Eliminated in round of 16
11	D	Australia	4	2	0	2	4	6	−2	6	Eliminated in round of 16
12	G	Switzerland	4	2	0	2	5	9	−4	6	Eliminated in round of 16
13	E	Spain	4	1	2	1	9	3	+6	5	Eliminated in round of 16
14	B	United States	4	1	2	1	3	4	−1	5	Eliminated in round of 16
15	C	Poland	4	1	1	2	3	5	−2	4	Eliminated in round of 16
16	H	South Korea	4	1	1	2	5	8	−3	4	Eliminated in round of 16
17	E	Germany	3	1	1	1	6	5	+1	4	Eliminated in group stage
18	A	Ecuador	3	1	1	1	4	3	+1	4	Eliminated in group stage
19	G	Cameroon	3	1	1	1	4	4	0	4	Eliminated in group stage
20	H	Uruguay	3	1	1	1	2	2	0	4	Eliminated in group stage
21	D	Tunisia	3	1	1	1	1	1	0	4	Eliminated in group stage
22	C	Mexico	3	1	1	1	2	3	−1	4	Eliminated in group stage
23	F	Belgium	3	1	1	1	1	2	−1	4	Eliminated in group stage
24	H	Ghana	3	1	0	2	5	7	−2	3	Eliminated in group stage
25	C	Saudi Arabia	3	1	0	2	3	5	−2	3	Eliminated in group stage
26	B	Iran	3	1	0	2	4	7	−3	3	Eliminated in group stage
27	E	Costa Rica	3	1	0	2	3	11	−8	3	Eliminated in group stage
28	D	Denmark	3	0	1	2	1	3	−2	1	Eliminated in group stage
29	G	Serbia	3	0	1	2	5	8	−3	1	Eliminated in group stage
30	B	Wales	3	0	1	2	1	6	−5	1	Eliminated in group stage
31	F	Canada	3	0	0	3	2	7	−5	0	Eliminated in group stage
32	A	Qatar (H)	3	0	0	3	1	7	−6	0	Eliminated in group stage

Source: FIFA
(H) Hosts

== Awards ==
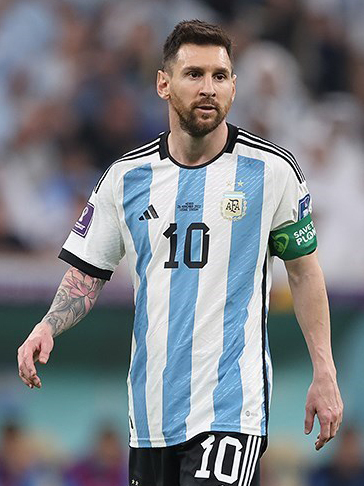
Argentina captain and forward Lionel Messi won the Golden Ball award, becoming the first player to win it twice.

The following World Cup awards were given at the conclusion of the tournament: the Golden Boot (top scorer), Golden Ball (best overall player) and Golden Glove (best goalkeeper).

Golden Ball	Silver Ball	Bronze Ball
(Argentina national football team) Lionel Messi	(France national football team) Kylian Mbappé	(Croatia national football team) Luka Modrić
Golden Boot	Silver Boot	Bronze Boot
(France national football team) Kylian Mbappé 8 goals, 2 assists	(Argentina national football team) Lionel Messi 7 goals, 3 assists	(France national football team) Olivier Giroud 4 goals, 0 assists
Golden Glove
(Argentina national football team) Emiliano Martínez
FIFA Young Player Award
(Argentina national football team) Enzo Fernández
FIFA Fair Play Trophy
England

Additionally, FIFA.com shortlisted 10 goals for users to vote on as the tournament's best. The award was won by Brazil's Richarlison for his second goal in the group stage match against Serbia.

== Marketing ==
=== Branding ===
The official emblem was designed by Unlock Brands and unveiled in September 2019, during simultaneous events at the Doha Tower, Katara Cultural Village amphitheatre, Msheireb Downtown Doha, and Zubarah. It is based on a shawl (reflecting upon the tournament's late-Autumn scheduling) and desert dunes, and was shaped to resemble the tournament trophy, the infinity symbol, and the number "8"—reflecting upon the "interconnected" event and the eight host stadiums. The typography of the emblem's wordmark incorporated kashida—the practice of elongating certain parts of characters in Arabic script to provide typographical emphasis.

H.E Ambassador Dr. Hend Al-Muftah, Permanent Representative of the State of Qatar to the United Nations Office at Geneva, explained to WIPO Magazine that the tournament provided an opportunity to "promote our culture and showcase our signature hospitality in a multicultural environment", and highlighted that the country has used sports to demonstrate its "commitment to sustainable development, social inclusion and the values of community and mutual respect among peoples from different cultures and nations."

=== Merchandise ===
Electronic Arts' licensed video games FIFA Mobile and FIFA 23 (except on Nintendo Switch) received free updates with tie-in content for the 2022 World Cup on 8 and 9 November 2022, respectively. The update for FIFA 23 added World Cup-themed tournament modes with all teams and two of the stadiums from the event, campaigns and World Cup-themed unlockable content for Ultimate Team mode, and real-time squad and fixture updates during the tournament.

On 24 August 2022, the Panini Group produced themed stickers and a sticker album for a 14th consecutive World Cup. This year, rare cards with coloured borders were included and could be collected, traded, or sold.

On 12 April 2022, FIFA released an over-the-top media service and app revolving around the World Cup called FIFA+, where fans could play games, predict matches, and compete with others.

=== Broadcasting rights ===
In May 2022, Infantino projected that the 2022 FIFA World Cup could be the most-watched in its history, with a global audience of at least 5 billion. The 2018 tournament was seen by 3.57 billion across the tournament. The various controversies surrounding the World Cup in Qatar led to questions over how the tournament would be covered in the media, and whether they would be discussed or addressed during coverage. The match between England and the United States in the group stage was seen by approximately 20 million viewers across both Fox and Telemundo, ranking among the highest-rated associated football broadcasts in the United States (behind a 2014 World Cup match that drew 24.7 million).

=== Sponsorship ===
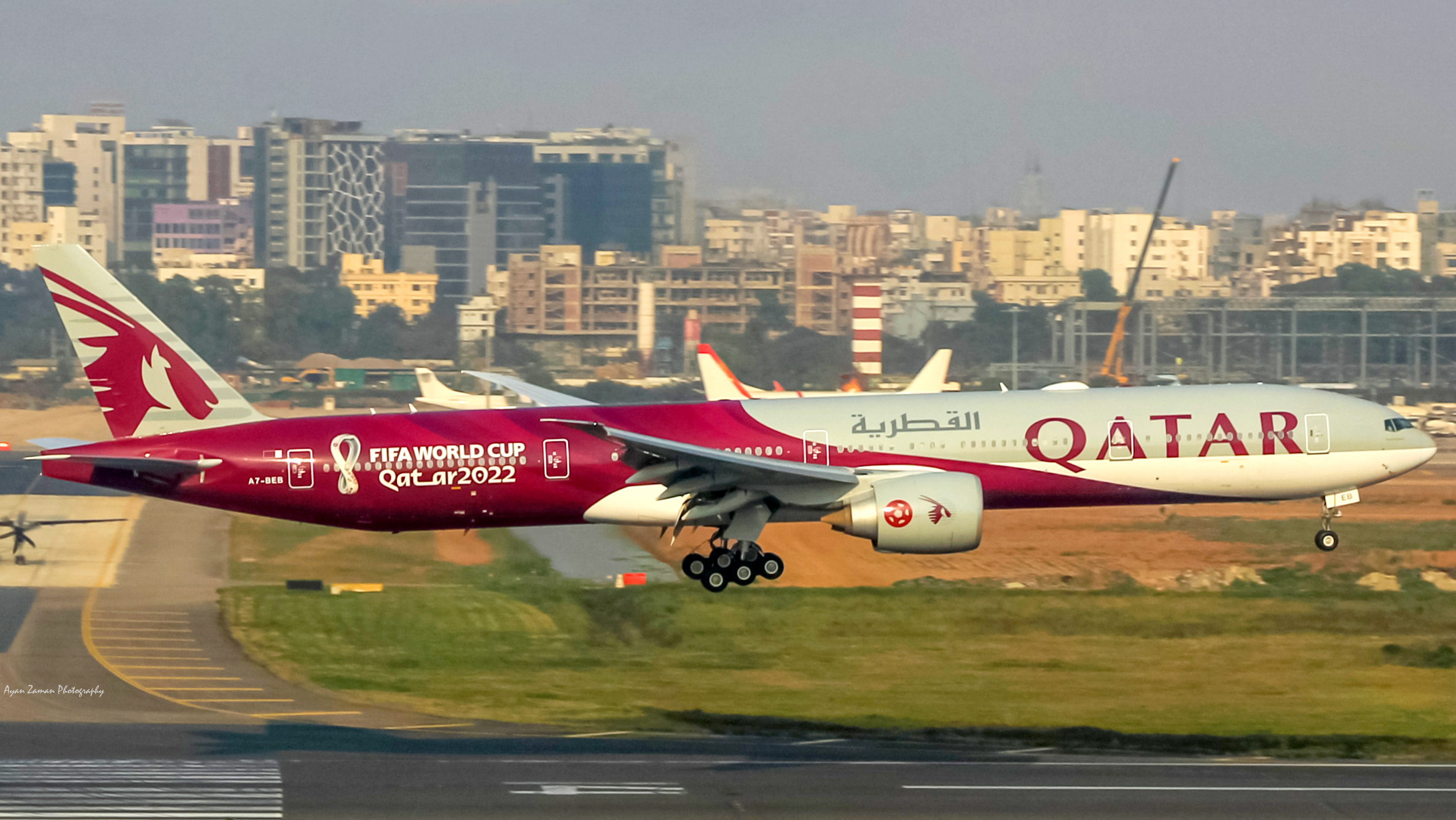
Qatar Airways was one of the sponsors of FIFA World Cup 2022.

The sponsors of the 2022 World Cup are divided into seven categories: FIFA Partners, FIFA World Cup Sponsors and African and Middle Eastern, Asian, European, North American and South American supporters. This marks the first time a FIFA World Cup is sponsored by supporters from seven different regions.

FIFA partners	FIFA World Cup sponsors	African and Middle Eastern supporters	Asian supporters	European supporters	North American supporters	South American supporters
Adidas; Coca-Cola; Hyundai–Kia; Qatar Airways; QatarEnergy; Visa; Wanda Group	Anheuser-Busch InBev; Byju's; Crypto.com; Hisense; McDonald's; Mengniu Dairy; Vivo	Fine Hygienic Holding; GWC Logistics; Ooredoo; Saudi Tourism Authority; QNB Group	BOSS Zhipin; Yadea	Betano; Globant; YouTube	Algorand; Frito-Lay; Look Company; Visit Las Vegas	Claro; Inter Rapidísimo; Nubank; UPL

== Symbols ==
=== Mascot ===
The tournament's official mascot was unveiled on 1 April 2022, during the group stage draw. Its name is "Laʼeeb" (Arabic: لعيب, romanised: Laʿīb), which is an Arabic word meaning "super-skilled player". The official website of FIFA says: "Laʼeeb will be known for his youthful spirit; spreading joy and confidence everywhere he goes", and the official backstory of the character, published there, claims that it comes from a parallel world where tournament mascots live, "a world where ideas and creativity form the basis of characters that live in the minds of everyone".

=== Match balls ===
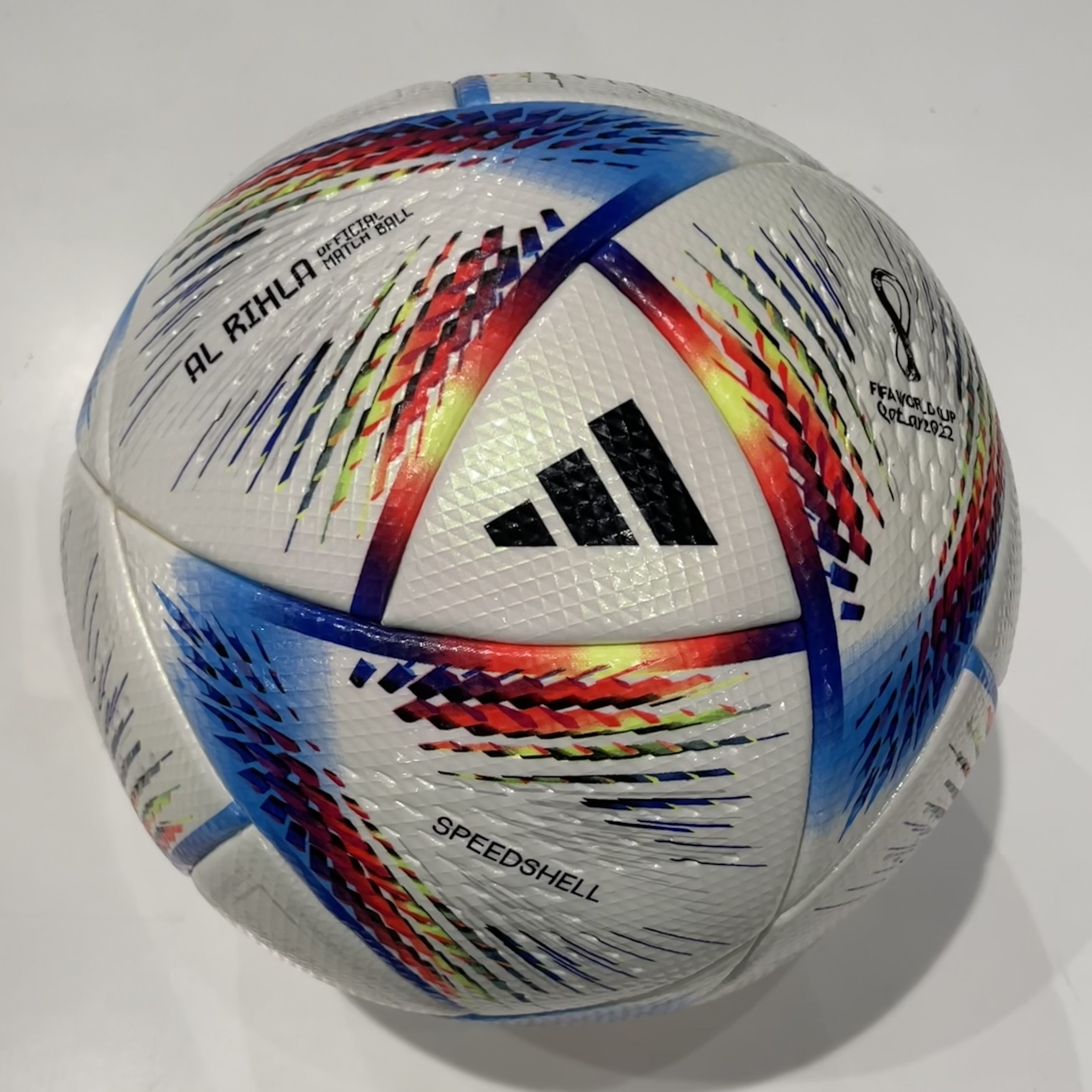
Adidas Al Rihla

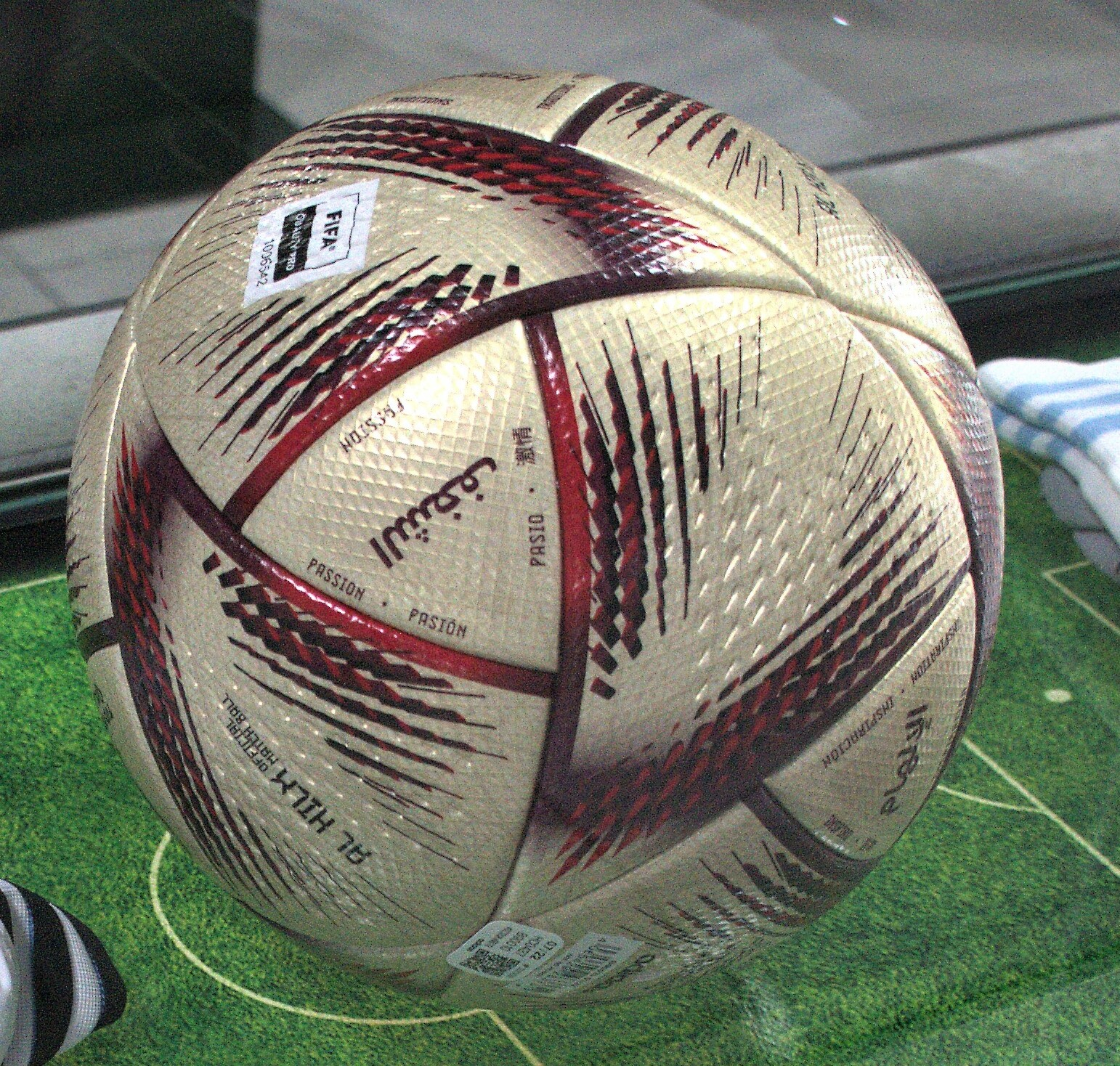
Adidas Al Hilm

The first official match ball, "Adidas Al Rihla", was unveiled on 30 March 2022. It was mainly inspired by the culture, architecture, iconic boats and flag of Qatar. In Arabic, the word Al-Rihla (الْرِّحْلَة ar-riḥla) means "the journey". The ball was designed with sustainability as a priority, making it the first-ever official match ball created with water-based glues and inks. As "the game is getting faster" and "speeds up", the ball has internal electronic sensors, allowing detection of its speed and position, updated 500 times per second and it has to be charged before each game. Two of the match balls were sent and returned from space by FIFA and Qatar Airways on a SpaceX falcon 9 suborbital mission for promoting the World Cup.

The match ball for the semi-finals, match for third place and final was announced on 11 December 2022. It is a variation of the Al Rihla named the "Adidas Al Hilm" (Arabic: الحلم, romanised: al-ḥulm, lit. ''the dream'', a reference to "every nation's dream of lifting the FIFA World Cup"). While the technical aspects of the ball are the same, the colour is different from the Al Rihla balls used in the group stages and preceding knockout games, with a Gold Metallic, maroon, Collegiate Burgundy, and red design, a reference to the national colours of host nation Qatar and the golden colours shared by the Final's venue and the FIFA World Cup Trophy.

=== Music ===
For the first time, a multi-song FIFA World Cup official soundtrack has been released, instead of one official song. The first song of the album is "Hayya Hayya (Better Together)", performed by Trinidad Cardona, Davido, and AISHA, released on 1 April 2022 along with the music video. The second song is "Arhbo", performed by Gims and Ozuna, released on 19 August 2022 along with the music video. The third song is "The World Is Yours to Take" performed by American rapper Lil Baby, released on 23 September 2022 along with a music video. The fourth song is "Light The Sky" performed by Nora Fatehi, Manal, Rahma Riad, and Balqees, composed by RedOne and released on 7 October 2022 along with the music video. A fifth song, "Tukoh Taka", performed by Nicki Minaj, Maluma and Myriam Fares, was released on 17 November 2022 along with the music video, serving as the official song of the FIFA Fan Festival. The final song is "Dreamers" by Jungkook of BTS released on 20 November 2022. It was performed with Fahad Al-Kubaisi during the tournament's opening ceremony.

== Controversies ==
Criticism of the 2022 World Cup focused on Qatar's human-rights record, namely its treatment of migrant workers and women and its position on LGBT rights, which led to allegations of sportswashing. (Note: Citations:) Qatar's climate and lack of a strong football culture were also criticised. There were allegations that Qatar used bribery to obtain hosting rights, as well as allegations of wider FIFA corruption. Boycotts of the event were declared by several countries, clubs, and individual players, with former FIFA president Sepp Blatter twice stating that allowing Qatar to host was a mistake, and that it won the bid thanks to pressure applied by then-president of France Nicolas Sarkozy on former UEFA president Michel Platini.

=== Host selection criticism ===
There have been allegations of bribery and corruption in the selection process involving FIFA's executive committee members. These allegations are being investigated by FIFA. In May 2011, allegations of corruption within the FIFA senior officials raised questions over the legitimacy of the World Cup 2022 being held in Qatar. The accusations of corruption were made relating to how Qatar won the right to host the event. A FIFA internal investigation and report cleared Qatar of any violation, but chief investigator Michael J. Garcia described FIFA's report on his enquiry as containing "numerous materially incomplete and erroneous representations."

In May 2015, Swiss federal prosecutors opened an investigation into corruption and money laundering related to the 2018 and 2022 World Cup bids. In August 2018, former FIFA president Sepp Blatter claimed that Qatar had used "black ops", suggesting that the bid committee had cheated to win the hosting rights. Some investigations found that Qatar sought an edge in securing hosting by hiring a former CIA officer turned private contractor, Kevin Chalker, to spy on rival bid teams and key football officials who picked the winner in 2010.

In September 2018, a delegation from al-Ghufran tribe lodged a complaint to FIFA's president to reject the establishment of the World Cup in Qatar unless its government restored the Qatari nationality to all those affected from the tribe and returned land allegedly stolen from them to build the sport facilities.

In September 2023 it was reported that court documents show a transfer of $300M dollars were sent to people who voted on the 2022 World Cup host.

Qatar faced strong criticism for the treatment of foreign workers involved in preparation for the World Cup, with Amnesty International referring to "forced labour" and poor working conditions, while many migrant workers reported having to pay large "recruitment fees" to obtain employment. The Guardian newspaper reported that many workers were denied food and water, had their identity papers taken away from them, and that they were not paid on time or at all, making some of them in effect slaves. The Guardian estimated that up to 4,000 workers could die from lax safety and other causes by the time the competition was held. Between 2015 and 2021, the Qatari government adopted new labour reforms to improve working conditions, including a minimum wage for all workers and the removal of the kafala system. Furthermore, in November 2017, the International Labour Organization concluded that no rights were violated and made the decision to close the complaint against Qatar regarding the alleged violation of migrant workers' rights. According to Amnesty International, however, living and working conditions of the foreign workers did not improve in the last years.

Qatar was the smallest nation by area ever to have been awarded a FIFA World Cup – the next smallest by area was Switzerland, host of the 1954 World Cup, which was more than three times as large as Qatar and only needed to host 16 teams instead of 32. Qatar also became only the second country (not including Uruguay and Italy, hosts of the first two World Cups) to be awarded a FIFA World Cup despite having never qualified for a previous edition: Japan was awarded co-hosting rights of the 2002 World Cup in 1996 without ever having qualified for the finals, although they qualified for the 1998 edition. Of the eight stadiums used in the tournament, six were located in the Doha metropolitan area, making it the first World Cup since 1930 in which most of the stadiums were in one city. While this decreased the distance that fans and players needed to commute, Qatar itself struggled to accommodate the numbers of arriving fans with its diminutive amount of space.

Due to Qatar's laws on alcohol consumption, World Cup organisers announced the creation of designated "sobering-up" zones as an alternative to wide-scale arrests of intoxicated fans during the World Cup. Qatar's World Cup chief executive of the Supreme Committee for Delivery and Legacy, Nasser Al Khater, stated that the purpose of the designated sobering-up areas was to ensure the fans' safety. If a fan was sent to the "sobering up" zone, they were permitted to leave when they could display clearheaded behaviour. Multiple news agencies described the controversy as a "cultural clash" between social conservatism and Islamic morality against the "norms" of secular Western liberal democracies.

A number of groups and media outlets expressed concern over the suitability of Qatar to host the event. Issues ranged from human rights, worker conditions, the rights of LGBT fans, and the illegality of homosexuality in Qatar. In December 2020, Qatar said rainbow flags would be allowed at the 2022 FIFA World Cup. Qatari officials initially stated that they would not prohibit the display of pride flags at tournament venues, although the country still advised LGBT attendees to comply with the country's modesty and avoid public displays of affection. Hassan Abdulla al-Thawadi, chief executive of the country's World Cup bid, said that Qatar would permit alcohol consumption during the event, even though drinking in public was not permitted. There were plans to allow the sale of alcohol inside stadiums and at fan villages. Normally, the sale of alcohol is restricted to non-Muslim guests at selected luxury hotels only. However, in the months preceding the tournament, the display of LGBT material and the sale of alcohol were banned.

The climate conditions caused some to call hosting the tournament in Qatar infeasible, with initial plans for air-conditioned stadiums giving way to a potential date switch from summer to November and December. In May 2014, Sepp Blatter, who was FIFA president at the time of the selection, remarked that awarding the World Cup to Qatar was a "mistake", and that the Qatari bid won because former UEFA president Michel Platini, under pressure from France's then-president Nicolas Sarkozy, got four countries to vote for Qatar instead of the United States. While addressing delegates from African and Asian confederations, Blatter said allegations of corruption and some of the criticism, including those from sponsors, were "very much linked to racism and discrimination". The attendance figures at the matches also came under scrutiny as the reported crowd attendance was more than the stadium capacities despite games having visible empty seats.

Prior to the tournament, a reporter for Denmark's TV 2 was threatened by security during a live report from the Katara Cultural Village; the organising committee apologised, stating that they were "mistakenly interrupted". Tony O'Donoghue of Ireland's RTÉ also accused Qatari police of interrupting him while filming.

Phaedra Almajid, a former media officer for Qatar's 2022 World Cup bid, has alleged that three African football officials were offered bribes to support Qatar's bid. In a Netflix documentary series "FIFA Uncovered," Almajid claims that Hassan Al Thawadi, who led Qatar's bid, offered €2.3 million each to Issa Hayatou of Cameroon, Jacques Anouma of Ivory Coast, and Amos Adamu of Nigeria in exchange for their votes. Qatar was competing with Australia, Japan, South Korea and the US for their bid for the 2022 World Cup. The alleged offer was made during a meeting of African football federations in January 2010. Almajid states that the money was intended for the football federations, not as personal bribes. She initially disclosed these allegations anonymously to the Sunday Times after being dismissed from her position, but later retracted her claims, citing threats from Qatar. Al Thawadi has denied these allegations, calling them false and expressing disappointment at the situation. The controversy adds to the ongoing scrutiny surrounding Qatar's successful bid to host the 2022 World Cup.

=== Targeted hacking campaigns against critics ===
On 2 November 2022, Swiss media outlet SRF Investigativ published an investigative piece about Qatar's elaborate and extensive espionage operation to secure the World Cup hosting rights. The operation, dubbed "Project Merciless", involved hacking emails and phones of FIFA officials and critics of Qatar's corruption and poor human rights record. It also targeted their friends and family members to run smear campaigns and influence FIFA policy. Starting on 5 January 2012, a cyberattack targeted Peter Hargitay, a Zurich-based FIFA insider and consultant for Australia's 2022 World Cup bid. Hargitay and his son hired an expert who traced the hack to a server linked to Rajat Khare of the mercenary Indian hack-for-hire firm Appin. In November 2022, a lower court in Geneva ordered the publication to provisionally remove Rajat Khare's name and photo from the article. As a result, he is currently referred to as an entrepreneur, though his name still appears in a Reuters article about his involvement in the hacking.

On 5 November 2022, The Sunday Times and the Bureau of Investigative Journalism published an investigation reporting that a group from an Indian hacking company had compromised the email accounts of various politicians, reporters, and other prominent individuals that had been critical of Qatar's hosting of the World Cup. It was also reported that the group had been hired by Jonas Rey, private investigators based in Switzerland, which were in turn hired by Qatari officials.

=== Migrant workers ===
There was criticism regarding the state of human rights in Qatar and of the conditions of migrant workers brought in to build the required infrastructure, including indentured servitude and working conditions leading to deaths. On 23 October 2022, an article published by The Guardian included statements from migrants working on the event infrastructure. Surveying 1,000 workers, 86% of participants said that the labour changes had improved their lives and that better working conditions are negotiable. Legislation has also been proposed on the minimum wage, summertime worker safety, and the election of migrant worker representatives in businesses. Labour mobility is a result of changes to the Kafala system.

According to Sharan Burrow, general secretary of the International Trade Union Confederation, prior to the tournament, "the new Kafala system tranche of law will put an end to Kafala and establish a contemporary industrial relations system."

FIFA President Gianni Infantino has defended Qatar's decision to host the tournament. The Economist has asserted that Qatar has a better human rights record than Russia and China, and that the country has received excessive criticism after being selected to host the event.

=== Move to November and December ===
Owing to the climate in Qatar, concerns were expressed over holding the World Cup in its traditional time frame of June and July. In October 2013, a task force was commissioned to consider alternative dates and report after the 2014 FIFA World Cup in Brazil. On 24 February 2015, the FIFA Task Force proposed that the tournament be played from late November to late December 2022, to avoid the summer heat and also avoid clashing with the 2022 Winter Olympics in February, the 2022 Winter Paralympics in March and Ramadan in April.

The notion of staging the tournament in November was controversial because it would interfere with the regular season schedules of some domestic leagues around the world. Commentators noted the clash with the Christian Christmas season was likely to cause disruption, while there was concern about how short the tournament was intended to be. FIFA executive committee member Theo Zwanziger said that awarding the event to Qatar was a "blatant mistake".

Frank Lowy, chairman of Football Federation Australia, said that if the 2022 World Cup were moved to November and thus upset the schedule of the A-League, they would seek compensation from FIFA. Richard Scudamore, chief executive of the Premier League, stated that they would consider legal action against FIFA because a move would interfere with the Premier League's popular Christmas and New Year fixture programme. In 2015, FIFA confirmed that the final would be played in December. Critics condemned the Euro-centrism of these allegations, and questioned why global sporting events must be held within the traditional European summer season.

=== Bidding corruption allegations, 2014 ===
Some allegations were made over the role of former football official Mohammed bin Hammam played in securing the bid. A former employee of the Qatar bid team alleged that several African officials were paid $1.5 million by Qatar. She retracted her claims, but later said that she was coerced to do so by Qatari bid officials. In March 2014, it was discovered that former CONCACAF president Jack Warner and his family were paid almost $2 million from a firm linked to Qatar's successful campaign.

The Sunday Times published bribery allegations based on a leak of millions of secret documents. Five of FIFA's six primary sponsors, Sony, Adidas, Visa, Hyundai, and Coca-Cola, called upon FIFA to investigate the claims. Jim Boyce, vice-president of FIFA, stated he would support a re-vote to find a new host if the corruption allegations are proven. FIFA completed a lengthy investigation into these allegations and a report cleared Qatar of any wrongdoing. Despite the claims, the Qataris insisted that the corruption allegations were being driven by envy and mistrust while Blatter said it was fuelled by racism in the British media.

In the 2015 FIFA corruption case, Swiss officials, operating under information from the United States Department of Justice, arrested many senior FIFA officials in Zürich and seized physical and electronic records from FIFA's main headquarters. The arrests continued in the United States, where several FIFA officers were arrested, and FIFA buildings were raided. The arrests were made on the information of at least a $150 million corruption and bribery scandal. From those arrested, $40 million was forfeited under guilty pleas. In 2022, the president of the El Salvador soccer association, Reynaldo Vasquez, was sentenced to 16 months in prison in connection to over $350,000 in bribes.

Following the corruption case, Phaedra Almajid, the former media officer for the Qatar bid team, claimed that the allegations would result in Qatar not hosting the World Cup. In an interview published on the same day, Domenico Scala, the head of FIFA's Audit and Compliance Committee, stated that "should there be evidence that the awards to Qatar and Russia came only because of bought votes, then the awards could be cancelled."

In 2014, FIFA appointed Michael Garcia as its independent ethics investigator to look into bribery allegations against Russia and Qatar. Garcia investigated all nine bids and eleven countries involved in the 2018 and 2022 bids. At the end of the investigation, Garcia submitted a 430-page report. The FIFA governing body then appointed a German judge, Hans Joachim Eckert, who reviewed and presented a 42-page summary of the report two months later. The report cleared Qatar and Russia of bribery allegations, stating that Qatar "pulled Aspire into the orbit of the bid in significant ways" but did not "compromise the integrity" of the overall bid process. Michael Garcia reacted almost immediately, stating that the report is "materially incomplete" and contains "erroneous representations of the facts and conclusions".

In 2017, a German journalist Peter Rossberg claimed to have obtained the report and wrote that it "does not provide proof that the 2018 or 2022 World Cup was bought" and stated that he would publish the full report. This forced FIFA to release the original report. The full report did not provide any evidence of corruption against the host of the 2022 World Cup but stated that bidders tested the rules of conduct to the limit.

=== Russian participation ===
On 9 December 2019, the World Anti-Doping Agency (WADA) handed Russia a four-year ban from all major sporting events, after RUSADA was found non-compliant for handing over manipulated lab data to investigators. The Russian national team were still permitted to enter qualification, as the ban only applied to the final tournament to decide the world champions. A team representing Russia, which used the Russian flag and anthem, could not participate under the WADA decision whilst the ban was active. The decision was appealed to the Court of Arbitration for Sport, and on 17 December 2020, Russian teams were banned from competing at world championships organised or sanctioned by a WADA signatory until 16 December 2022, the day before the match for third place.

After the Russian invasion of Ukraine, Russia's participation was further thrown into doubt. On 24 February 2022, the three teams in Russia's qualifying path—Czech Republic, Poland, and Sweden—announced their unwillingness to play any matches in Russian territory. Poland and Sweden extended the boycott on 26 February to any qualifying games, and the Czech Republic made the same decision one day later.

On 27 February 2022, FIFA announced a number of sanctions impacting Russia's participation in international football. Russia was prohibited from hosting international competitions, and the national team was ordered to play all home matches behind closed doors in neutral countries. Under these sanctions, Russia would not be allowed to compete under the country's name, flag, or national anthem; similarly to the Russian athletes' participation in events such as the Olympics, the team would compete under the abbreviation of their national federation, the Russian Football Union ("RFU"), rather than "Russia". The next day, FIFA decided to suspend Russia from international competitions "until further notice", including its participation in the 2022 FIFA World Cup.

=== LGBTQ and women's rights ===
There are no LGBTQ rights in Qatar, with homosexuality as well as campaigning for LGBTQ+ rights criminalised. As such, when Qatar was selected to host the 2022 FIFA World Cup, the choice to do so in a restrictive nation saw much criticism, with the security of fans, as well as the homophobic football chants of certain nations, were points of discussion. The main controversy came from a last-minute FIFA decision to hand out player punishments to European captains who had months earlier announced their intention to defy FIFA's equipment regulations on non-mandated armbands and continue wearing third-party rainbow-coloured ones (which began in 2020) in support of anti-discrimination. Typically, kit violations incur a fine, which the teams had said they would pay; on the day of the first match involving one of the teams, FIFA reportedly told the teams that they would receive a yellow card at a minimum for wearing the armbands. Qatari officials stated that all people are welcome as long as they follow the public display of affection laws which apply to everyone.

Security officials at stadiums also confiscated items of rainbow clothing and flags featuring rainbows. American journalist Grant Wahl was briefly detained for wearing a T-shirt with a rainbow on it. Wahl reportedly received death threats for wearing the shirt, later dying at the stadium. Other journalists with Wahl at the time of his death have reported that he began fitting or experiencing a seizure, and called for help himself. They criticised the Qatar Supreme Committee for not providing defibrillators in the stadium, as they had looked for one to try to help Wahl. In response, FIFA said that according to the ambulance service, a defibrillator was made available when paramedics later arrived on scene. An autopsy done on Wahl in New York City later revealed that Wahl died from an aortic aneurysm rupture.

Discrimination against women in Qatar was also criticised. Women in Qatar have few freedoms, as they must obtain permission from their male guardians to marry, study abroad on government scholarships, work in many government jobs, travel abroad, receive certain forms of reproductive health care, and act as the primary guardian of children, even if they are divorced.

Qatar attracted particular criticism for an incident where a Mexican employee of the World Cup Organizing Committee was accused of allegedly having sex outside of marriage. The woman had previously reported rape, while the male claimed to have been in a relationship with her, after which the woman was investigated for extramarital sex. Women in Qatar face the possible penalty of flagellation and a seven-year prison sentence if convicted for having sex outside of marriage. The criminal case was eventually dropped months after she was allowed to leave Qatar.

=== Influence of Iran ===
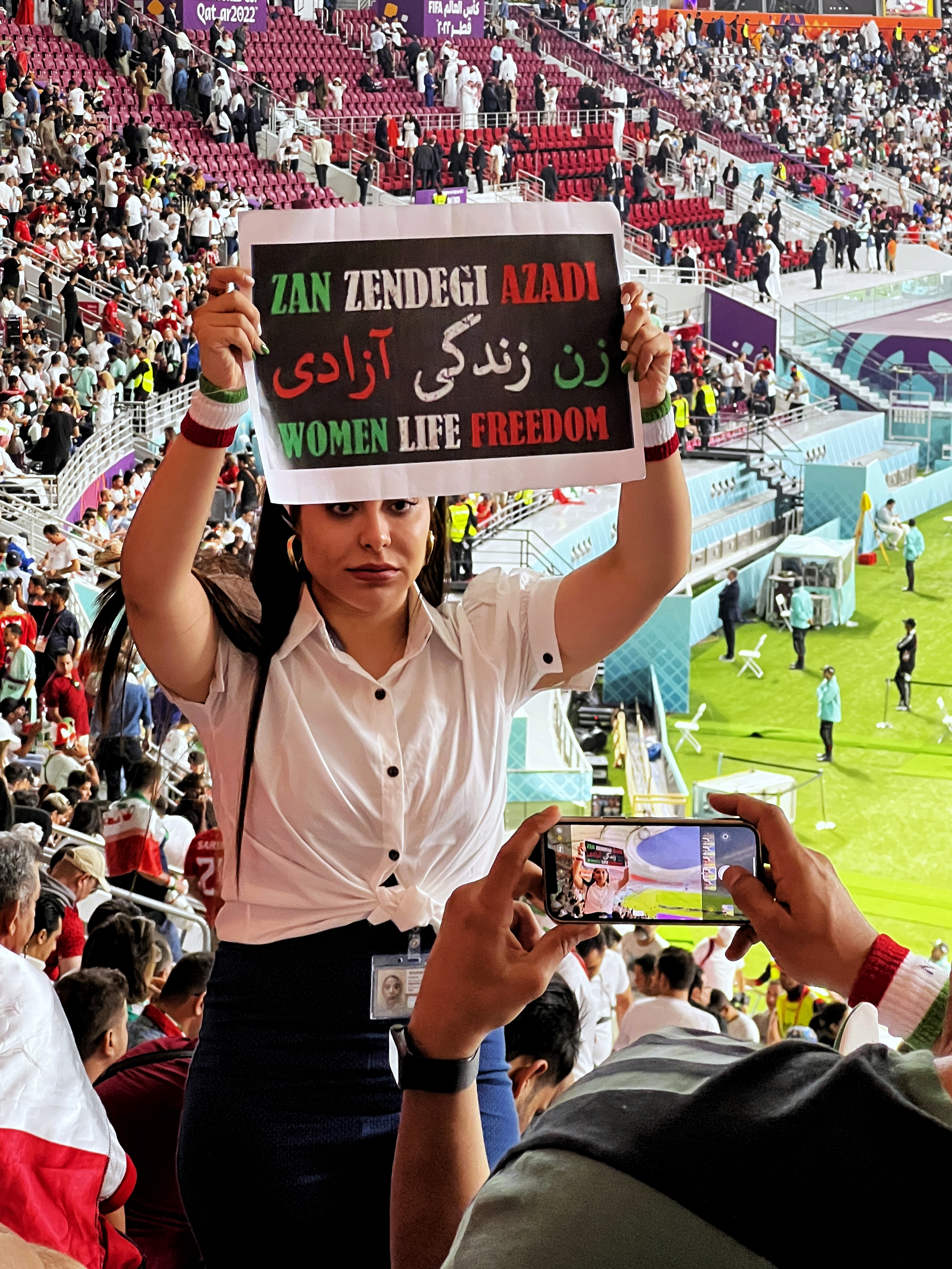
An Iranian fan showing a banner with "Woman, Life, Freedom" slogan.

In November 2022, there were reports suggesting that the government of Iran were working with Qatari officials to suppress anti-government protests at the 2022 FIFA World Cup, in light of the Mahsa Amini protests. Leaked documents and audio clips suggested that Iranian government officials were in correspondence with Qatari authorities in order to handle possible protesters.

In November 2022, the Qatari government revoked the visas of journalists from a London-based Iranian news channel, Iran International, known for being critical of the regime, who were seeking to cover the World Cup. On 21 November 2022, during the first group stage match from Group B, between Iran and England, attempts were reportedly made by the stadium's security forces to block Iranian fans who wore clothing or carried items bearing slogans that were deemed unsympathetic to the Islamic government of Iran. These included T-shirts and signs with "Woman, Life, Freedom" embedded onto them, Iran's previous flags such as the Lion and Sun flag, or any slogans containing the name of Mahsa Amini. This crackdown continued throughout all of Iran's matches at the World Cup. In addition to removing fans from stadiums, reports showed that officials tried to suppress any filming or photography of possible protests. In one case, Qatari police detained Danish TV presenter, Rasmus Tantholdt, for filming fans with "Woman, Life, Freedom" slogans, some of whom who had been earlier abused by a group of pro-government supporters.

=== Treatment of Jewish and Israeli visitors ===
Qatar had previously promised to provide Jewish tourists with cooked kosher food and public Jewish prayer services at the tournament. However, shortly before the World Cup began, both were banned by Qatar, who claimed it could not secure the safety of Jews. Qatar alleged that they could not "secure" the safety of publicly praying Jewish tourists, whilst many foreign Jews complained that they subsequently had no food available to eat. It was estimated that 10,000 religious Jews from Israel and around the world arrived to watch the World Cup in Qatar.

Whilst Jewish organisations complained of being unable to find cooked kosher food, the Israeli government said it was happy with the efforts made by Qatar to meet its requests, including kosher food, direct flights from Israel to Qatar, and temporary diplomatic representation in the country. A kosher kitchen under the supervision of Rabbi Mendy Chitrik was open in time for the first match. Rabbi Marc Schneier, president of The Foundation for Ethnic Understanding, said he had never asked the Qatari government for cooked food, and he had been the only person in communication with the Qataris regarding making the World Cup experience inclusive for Jews.

Multiple Israeli reporters at the tournament reported fans from Arab nations waving Palestinian flags and chanting anti-Israeli slogans while harassing them. Some Israelis reported that they had been escorted out of restaurants when their nationality was revealed. The Israeli government warned its citizens traveling to the tournament to hide their Israeli identity out of safety concerns.

=== Accommodation ===
The Rawdat Al Jahhaniya fan village was criticised for its overpriced "night cabins" (£185 per night) made out of shipping containers. Tourists complained that the air conditioners in the cabins did not function well, facilities were falling apart, and the sleeping experience did not match their expectations. The BBC reported that the tent accommodation at the Qetaifan Island fan village got criticism for having brown-coloured tap water and no air conditioning other than a standing fan. The tent village in Al Khor was criticised for having inconvenient transportation, a lack of alcohol, long waits to check in, and no locks on the tents. The lack of suitable and affordable accommodation raised demand for daily shuttle flights from neighbouring areas, such as Dubai, that had adequate numbers of hotel rooms.

=== Alcohol ban ===
Hassan Al-Thawadi, chief executive of the Qatar 2022 World Cup bid, said the Muslim state would also permit alcohol consumption during the event. Specific fan-zones would be established where alcohol could be bought. Although expatriates may purchase alcohol and certain businesses may sell alcohol with a permit, drinking in public is not permitted as Qatar's legal system is based on Sharia.

In February 2022, the communications executive director at the supreme committee, Fatma Al-Nuaimi, stated in an interview that alcohol would be available in designated fan zones outside stadiums and in other Qatari official hospitality venues. In July 2022, it was reported that while fans would be allowed to bring alcoholic beverages into the stadiums, alcoholic beverages would not be sold inside the stadiums. But according to a source, "the plans are still being finalised." However, on 18 November 2022, days before the first match, Qatar officially banned alcoholic beverages from sale within the eight stadiums. The ban only applied to regular fans, and alcohol was still available to FIFA officials and special guests.

On 30 November 2022, The Times published an interview with some female fans attending 2022 FIFA World Cup games, with some of them saying that less drunkenness among other attendees made them feel safer at the stadiums than they expected.

== See also ==
- FIFA World Cup
- FIFA World Cup hosts – Countries that hosted the FIFA World Cup
- 2021 FIFA Arab Cup – 10th Arab Cup, held in Qatar
- 2023 FIFA Women's World Cup – Football championship
