= Domenico Scala =

Domenico Scala can mean:

- Domenico Scala (manager), chairman of the FIFA audit and compliance committee
- Domenico Scala (cinematographer), Italian cinematographer
