= 2022 FIFA World Cup opening ceremony =

- Date: 20 November 2022
- Time: 17:30 AST (UTC+3)
- Location: Al Bayt Stadium, Al Khor, Qatar

The 2022 FIFA World Cup opening ceremony took place on Sunday, 20 November 2022 at the Al Bayt Stadium in Al Khor, prior to the opening match of the tournament between hosts Qatar and Ecuador. It included appearances by Morgan Freeman and Ghanim Al-Muftah, and a performance by South Korean singer Jungkook of BTS.

== Ceremony ==
Italian creative director Marco Balich, who previously worked on several Olympic opening and closing ceremonies, collaborated with co-artistic director Ahmed Al Baker during production.

The ceremony included many symbolic indications that express welcome, generosity and hospitality in Arab culture, as well as contemporary musical, cultural and visual performances that were used for the first time in the tournament, under a "tent" decoration that represents the Earth, in a message to invite the world to meet and unite. The ceremony, which lasted for about 30 minutes, was dominated by Arab states of the Persian Gulf and Arab heritage.

"The opening ceremony aimed to 'showcase the best of Qatari culture,' using the global stage to highlight Qatar's hospitality and unity while challenging stereotypes about the Arab world"

A conversation between Morgan Freeman and Ghanim Al-Muftah, a motivational speaker from Qatar, was a key component of the ceremony. Their interaction, which focused on the idea of "coming together despite differences," was widely praised for its symbolic representation of inclusion and diversity. A verse from Surat Al-Hujurat was read by Al-Muftah. This incident reinforced Qatar's dedication to respect and intercultural harmony.

=== Panels ===
The ceremony included seven panels that merged the Qatari and international cultures, showing the country's culture and values, the importance of respecting the other, and the need to change the misconception about the Arab world.

The first panel, "The Calling", depicted the sound of "El-Hoon", which is associated with receiving guests. During the "To Get to Know" panel, Qatari personality Ghanim Al-Muftah engaged in a conversation with American artist Morgan Freeman, during which Al-Muftah recited Al-Hujurat 49:13 from the Quran, calling for acceptance of difference and diversity among human beings, within a framework of inclusion.

يَا أَيُّهَا النَّاسُ إِنَّا خَلَقْنَاكُمْ مِنْ ذَكَرٍ وَأُنْثَى وَجَعَلْنَاكُمْ شُعُوبًا وَقَبَائِلَ لِتَعَارَفُوا إِنَّ أَكْرَمَكُمْ عِنْدَ اللَّهِ أَتْقَاكُمْ إِنَّ اللَّهَ عَلِيمٌ خَبِيرٌ
O mankind, indeed We have created you from male and female and made you peoples and tribes that you may know one another. Indeed, the most noble of you in the sight of Allah [God] is the most righteous of you.

FIFA described Al-Muftah's role as central to the ceremony's theme of "promoting peace and mutual respect".

The "Rhythm of Nations" panel combined Qatari music with the most famous cheers of encouragement for the 32 participating teams. This was followed by the "Football Nostalgia" panel, which collects former official mascots in honour of the previous host countries of the World Cup, followed by the "Dreamers" panel, which included performances by member of the Korean band BTS, Jungkook, who was later joined by Qatari artist Fahad Al Kubaisi.

An archival historical film was shown for the first time during the "Roots of the Dream" panel, showing the former Emir, Sheikh Hamad bin Khalifa Al Thani, playing football with a group of his friends. The ceremony concluded with the panel "Here and Now", which consisted of a speech by the Emir of Qatar, Sheikh Tamim bin Hamad Al Thani, and ended with the appearance of the official logo of the 2022 FIFA World Cup at a height of 15 meters coupled with a fireworks display.

== Dignitaries in attendance ==
A number of foreign politicians and dignitaries attended the opening ceremony, including 17 heads of state, government and international organizations.

- President of FIFA – Gianni Infantino and all members of the FIFA Council
- President of the International Olympic Committee – Thomas Bach and all members of the IOC
- Secretary-General of the United Nations – António Guterres
- (World Health Organization) Director-General of WHO – Tedros Adhanom Ghebreyesus
- President of Algeria – Abdelmadjid Tebboune
- Crown Prince of Bahrain – Salman bin Hamad Al Khalifa
- President of Djibouti – Ismail Omar Guelleh
- Vice President of Ecuador – Alfredo Borrero
- President of Egypt – Abdel Fattah el-Sisi
- (European Union) Vice President of the European Commission – Margaritis Schinas
- Vice President of India – Jagdeep Dhankhar
- Minister of Sports of Iran – Hamid Sajjadi
- King of Jordan – Abdullah II and Hussein, Crown Prince of Jordan
- Former President of Kosovo – Atifete Jahjaga
- Crown Prince of Kuwait – Mishal Al-Ahmad Al-Jaber Al-Sabah
- Prime Minister of Lebanon – Najib Mikati
- President of Liberia – George Weah
- Prime Minister of Libya – Fathi Bashagha
- Crown Prince and Sports Minister of Oman – Theyazin bin Haitham
- President of Palestine – Mahmoud Abbas
- Emir of Qatar – Tamim bin Hamad Al Thani
- Former Emir of Qatar – Hamad bin Khalifa Al Thani and members of the Qatari royal family
- Assistant to the President of Russia – Igor Levitin
- President of Rwanda – Paul Kagame
- Crown Prince of Saudi Arabia – Mohammed bin Salman
- President of Senegal – Macky Sall
- King and Queen of the Zulu tribe of South Africa – Misuzulu Sinqobile and Ntokozo Mayisela-Zulu
- President of Turkey – Recep Tayyip Erdoğan
- Prime Minister of the United Arab Emirates – Mohammed bin Rashid Al Maktoum
- Former United States Deputy Secretary of State – Keith J. Krach
- Vice President of Venezuela – Delcy Rodríguez
- First Minister of Wales – Mark Drakeford

== Controversies ==
=== Refusal of broadcast ===
In light of the allegations of human rights abuses and corruption scandal surrounding the World Cup, the British public service broadcaster BBC refused to broadcast the opening ceremony on television, although it was made available through its online and digital TV services.
