= Ghanim Al-Muftah =

Qatari YouTube streamer

Ghanim Muhammad al-Muftah
- غانم محمد المفتاح
- Born: 5 May 2002 (age 24); Doha, Qatar
- Website: https://ghanimalmuftah.org/

Ghanim Muhammad al-Muftah (Arabic: غانم محمد المفتاح, romanized: Ghānim Muḥammad al-Muftāḥ, born 5 May 2002) is a Qatari motivational speaker, activist, entrepreneur, and social media personality with caudal regression syndrome. He gained attention when he appeared alongside Morgan Freeman at the opening ceremony of the 2022 FIFA World Cup in Qatar. In 2017, he was Qatar's youngest entrepreneur at 15.

== Early life and education ==
Ghanim Muhammad Al-Muftah was born in Doha, Qatar on 5 May 2002, with caudal regression syndrome, a rare condition that affects the development of the lower spine. He has a twin brother named Ahmed.

Doctors reportedly gave him a low chance of survival. According to his website, his mother was advised before his birth that an abortion might be preferable, but she chose to continue the pregnancy. He walks on his hands. He receives surgical care in Europe each year.

Al-Muftah studied political science and has said he wants to become a diplomat. He reportedly graduated in political science in July 2024, and completed his studies at Loughborough University in England. He has also memorised the Quran.

== Career ==
Al-Muftah shares his daily life and activities on social media. In 2022 he had over one million YouTube subscribers, over three million Instagram followers, and about seven million TikTok followers. In 2018, he spoke at TEDxQatarUniversity about his living condition. In September 2024, he gave a speech at the Summit of the Future in New York.

=== 2022 FIFA World Cup ===
At the opening ceremony on 20 November 2022, al-Muftah appeared conversing with Morgan Freeman in a segment about unity and diversity during which Al-Muftah recited Al-Hujurat 49:13 from the Quran, calling for acceptance of difference and diversity among human beings, within a framework of inclusion.

يَا أَيُّهَا النَّاسُ إِنَّا خَلَقْنَاكُمْ مِنْ ذَكَرٍ وَأُنْثَى وَجَعَلْنَاكُمْ شُعُوبًا وَقَبَائِلَ لِتَعَارَفُوا إِنَّ أَكْرَمَكُمْ عِنْدَ اللَّهِ أَتْقَاكُمْ إِنَّ اللَّهَ عَلِيمٌ خَبِيرٌ
O mankind, indeed We have created you from male and female and made you peoples and tribes that you may know one another. Indeed, the most noble of you in the sight of Allah [God] is the most righteous of you.

Al-Muftah told crowd, "Everyone is welcome." FIFA president Gianni Infantino and Saudi Crown Prince Mohammed bin Salman were among those watching. FIFA described Al-Muftah's role as central to the ceremony's theme of "promoting peace and mutual respect".

=== Ambassadorships and partnerships ===
Al-Muftah was appointed a goodwill ambassador and brand ambassador at the 2022 FIFA World Cup. In February 2026, Ooredoo announced him as its brand ambassador.

In May 2025 he attended the first leg of the UEFA Champions League semi-final between Arsenal and Paris Saint-German in London, seated alongside president of Paris Saint-German, Nasser Al-Khelaifi.

=== Business ===
Al-Muftah founded an ice cream business, Gharissa Cream, becoming one of Qatar's youngest entrepreneurs.

=== Advocacy and philanthropy ===
Al-Muftah advocates for inclusion and rights of people with disabilities. He runs a charity, the Ghanim Association, which donates specialist chairs to people in need. His family helps run the charity.

== Sports and activities ==
Al-Muftah has climbed Jebel Shams, the highest peak in the Gulf region. As a child he played football at school with shoes on his hands.

He also completed Hajj pilgrimage in Mecca by crawling.

== Honours ==
- 2017: Young Entrepreneur, Takreem Foundation.
- Ghanim Al-Muftah Excellence Scholarship, established in 2026 by Loughborough University. It provides full tuition support for eligible Qatari students pursuing master's dgerees.
