= Kevin Chalker =

American former CIA officer and businessman

Kevin Chalker (born c. 1970) is an American businessman and former Central Intelligence Agency (CIA) officer. He is the founder and chief executive officer of the quantum-security company Qrypt. He previously founded Global Risk Advisors, a security consulting firm. Chalker has been the subject of reporting on his work as a CIA officer involved in operations concerning Iran's nuclear program, and on Global Risk Advisors' work for Qatar before and after the country's successful bid to host the 2022 FIFA World Cup.

== Early life and education ==
In high school and college, Chalker was a Golden Gloves boxer and a nationally-ranked competitor in judo. He attended the United States Air Force Academy (USAFA) for two years before dropping out due to an eye injury that he sustained in a bar fight. He later graduated from Texas Christian University (TCU). At the time of the September 11 attacks, Chalker was a graduate student at Johns Hopkins University's School of Advanced International Studies in Washington, D.C..

== Career ==
Chalker joined the CIA after September 11, and was assigned to counterproliferation work concerning the nuclear program of Iran. He told The New Yorker that he specialized in "cold pitch" approaches to Iranian scientists, seeking to persuade them to defect or cooperate with the United States. The magazine reported that it reviewed partially redacted excerpts of CIA employee evaluations and spoke with former officials in assessing his account. Chalker left the CIA in 2010, and founded Global Risk Advisors, a security consulting company that employed former military and intelligence personnel. He later founded Qrypt, a company focused on quantum-secure encryption.

In 2021, the Associated Press (AP) reported that Qatar had hired Chalker and Global Risk Advisors to gather intelligence on rival bid teams and football officials before the 2010 vote that awarded Qatar the 2022 FIFA World Cup. Global Risk Advisors' work included surveillance and influence projects concerning FIFA officials and critics of Qatar. One 2014 company document cited by the AP described "Project Merciless" and referred to "penetration operations" targeting critics inside FIFA. The AP also reported that the full scope of Chalker's work for Qatar was unclear. Swiss public broadcaster Schweizer Radio und Fernsehen (SRF), in reporting published by SWI swissinfo, also described an alleged Qatari intelligence operation involving former CIA operatives and said Switzerland was a major theatre of the operation because of FIFA's presence there.

== Investigations and legal disputes ==
In 2022, the AP reported that the Federal Bureau of Investigation (FBI) was examining whether Chalker's work for Qatar through Global Risk Advisors violated laws concerning foreign lobbying, surveillance or the export of sensitive technologies and tradecraft. Chalker's lawyer told AP that Global Risk Advisors had not engaged in unlawful activity and was unaware of a federal investigation. The FBI told AP it could neither confirm nor deny the existence of an investigation.

In 2023, Semafor reported that the United States Department of State was investigating Global Risk Advisors over allegations connected to hacking and training provided to Qatar's Ministry of Interior. Semafor reported that Global Risk Advisors denied wrongdoing.

Chalker and Global Risk Advisors were also defendants in litigation brought by Elliott Broidy and Broidy Capital Management. In 2021, the United States District Court for the Southern District of New York granted a motion to dismiss Broidy's amended complaint against Chalker, Global Risk Advisors and other defendants. Reuters reported in 2023 that Qatar, Chalker and Global Risk Advisors had denied Broidy's claims that Qatar hired the firm to hack his emails.
