= Domenico Scala (football administrator) =

- Born: 1965 (age 60–61); Basel, Switzerland
- Education: University of Basel
- Occupation: Manager in the biopharmaceutical industry
- Known for: Former chairman of the FIFA Audit & Compliance Committee

Domenico Scala (born 1965 in Basel, Switzerland) is a Swiss-Italian manager in the biopharmaceutical industry, and the former chairman of the FIFA Audit & Compliance Committee.

== Early life ==
Scala has a university degree in economics from the University of Basel. After his studies he worked for Nestlé, Panalpina and Roche, where he held various senior leadership positions.

== Dental appointments ==
In 2003, he became CFO of Syngenta AG and in 2007 CEO of the Swedish-Swiss dental company Nobel Biocare, specializing in dental implants. He is on the advisory board of Tufts University in Boston, the second largest dental faculty in North America. Since November 2011 he is Vice-Chairman of Basilea Pharmaceutica Ltd. and since January 2015 Chairman of i-net innovation networks Switzerland. In 2004, he was one of a selected few executives to be named "Young Global Leader" by the World Economic Forum (WEF).

== Football ==
In May 2013 the FIFA congress elected Scala as chairman of the Audit & Compliance Committee of FIFA, association football's international governing body. The committee has the task of overseeing FIFA's business practices. On June 2, 2015, he assumed the oversight/leadership of a reform program within FIFA. On September 10, 2015, he published a comprehensive governance reform report on FIFA. On February 26, 2016 the FIFA congress approved significant governance reforms, which have largely been devised by Domenico Scala along his reform "blueprint" published in September 2015. Scala's proposals are essentially looking to reshape FIFA along the lines of a modern corporation. Scala's most significant reforms are to introduce term limits and to split the governing executive committee along the lines of large corporations.

In an interview published on 7 June 2015, Scala stated that Russia and Qatar would possibly no longer be eligible to host the FIFA World Cup competitions in 2018 and 2022 if evidence of bribery was proven, saying "Should there be evidence that the awards to Qatar and Russia came only because of bought votes, then the awards could be cancelled."

Scala resigned from his position at FIFA on May 14, 2016.
