= List of Kean University people =

This is a list of notable people affiliated with Kean University of New Jersey.

== Alumni ==
=== Education ===
- Grace Baxter Fenderson, taught in Newark City Schools for 42 years; co-founded Newark chapter of NAACP in 1914
- Roseann Quinn (1966), schoolteacher whose 1973 murder was the basis for Judith Rossner's 1975 novel Looking for Mr. Goodbar and its derivative 1977 film
- Robert Van Houten, president of the New Jersey Institute of Technology 1947–1970

=== Government and politics ===
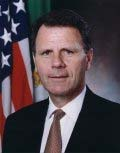
Alumnus James F. Sloan, head of intelligence for the U.S. Coast Guard

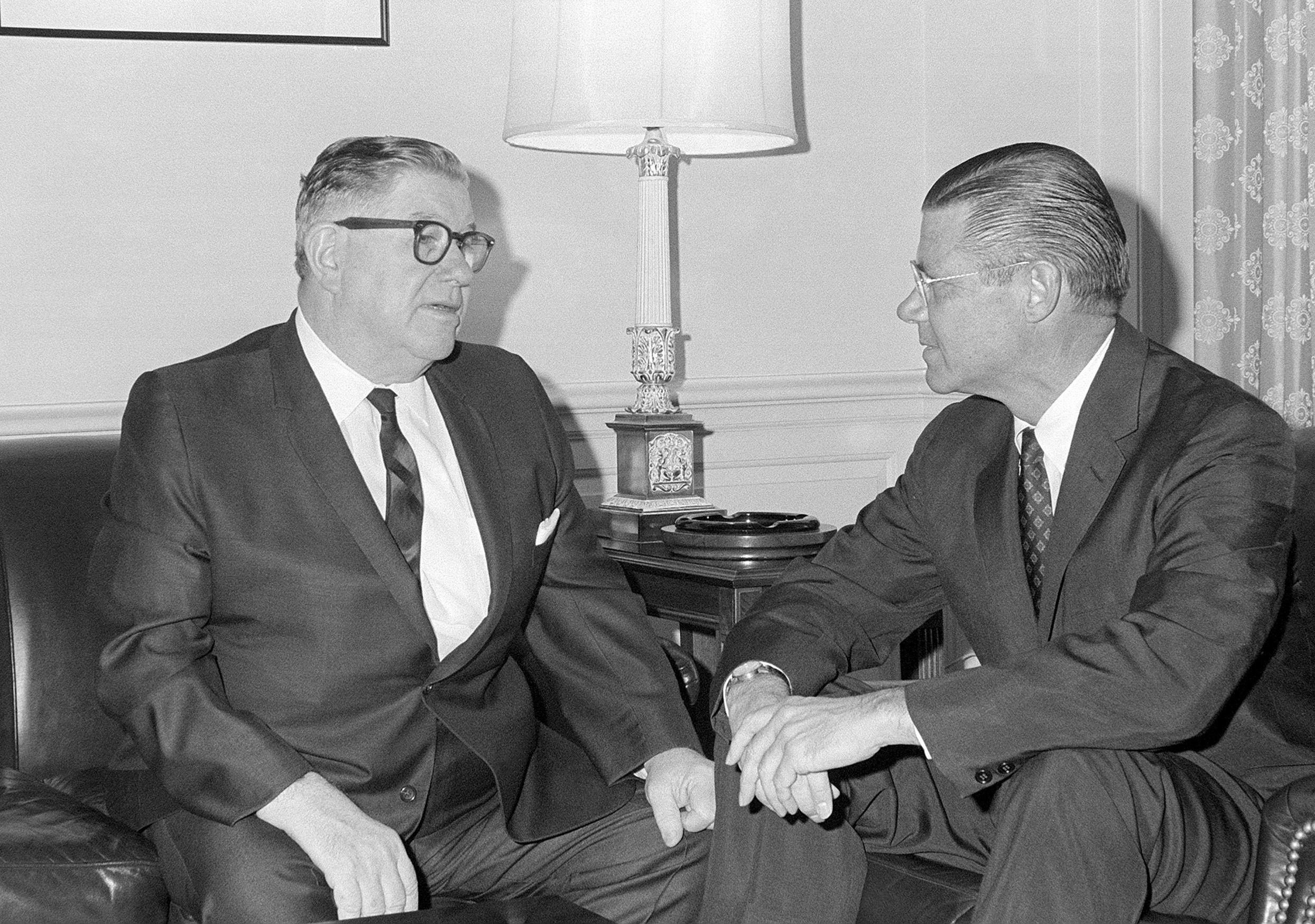
Alumnus Congressman Edward Patten meeting with Defense Secretary Robert McNamara in 1965

- Steve Adubato, Sr., Democratic politician; Kean honorary doctorate recipient
- León Febres Cordero, president of Ecuador (1984–1988)
- Edward J. Patten (Class of 1927), member of the United States House of Representatives from New Jersey's 15th congressional district (1963–1981); former New Jersey secretary of state (1954–1962)
- Donald Payne Jr., U.S. congressman from New Jersey's 10th congressional district (2012–2024)
- Nellie Pou, New Jersey assemblywoman (1997–present); assistant minority leader (2000–2001); deputy speaker of the New Jersey General Assembly (2002–2005)
- Nicholas Scutari, New Jersey senator (2004–present)
- James F. Sloan, assistant commandant for Intelligence and Criminal Investigations; head of intelligence for the United States Coast Guard (2003–2009)
- Joseph Suliga, New Jersey assemblyman (1994–2001); New Jersey senator (2001–2004)
- Oadline Truitt, New Jersey assemblywoman (2006–2008)

=== Music, art, entertainment ===
- Gwen Guthrie (1950–1999), singer
- Alan R. Moon, board game designer
- Richie Sambora, singer

=== Sports ===
- Crowbar (born Devon Storm), professional wrestler; graduated with a degree in Physical Therapy
- Petter Villegas, soccer winger; made his name with the MetroStars of Major League Soccer

=== TV, radio, and film ===
- Joe Bevilacqua (1982), actor, writer, producer, broadcaster, 2013 Kean Distinguished Alumni Award recipient
- Chris Cimino, TV meteorologist
- Christine E. Dickson, cognitive psychologist
- Linda Morris (1969), Emmy Award-winning writer and producer of Frasier
- Ed Naha, writer of science fiction novels and the screenplay for Honey, I Shrunk the Kids
- Roseann Quinn (1966), schoolteacher, literary and television character
- Vic Rauseo (1969), Emmy Award-winning writer and producer of Frasier
- Holly Taylor, actor, The Americans
- Bruce Williams, businessman; radio talk show host; host of The Bruce Williams Show

== Faculty ==
- McKinley Boston, director of athletics at Kean College, 1986–1987; athletics director at University of Rhode Island, 1988–1990; athletics director at University of Minnesota, 1991–1995; vice president for student development and athletics at University of Minnesota, 1995–2000; athletics director at New Mexico State University, 2004–present
- Harriet Frances Carpenter (1868/75 – 1956), kindergarten educator (1898-), writer, suffragist
- Frank J. Esposito, historian; Distinguished Service Professor of History at Kean; 2009 candidate for Lieutenant Governor of New Jersey with independent candidate Christopher Daggett
- Vera King Farris, Kean College vice president for Academic Affairs; third president of the Richard Stockton College of New Jersey, 1983–2003; former administrator at Kean, Stockton, the State University of New York at Stony Brook, the State University of New York at Brockport, and the University of Michigan; first African-American president of a New Jersey public college; New Jersey Woman of the Year in 1992; New Jersey Policymaker of the Year 1994
- John Gerrish, composer (best known for The Falcon); professor of music at Kean University
- Terry Golway, curator of the John T. Kean Center for American History at Kean University; author of several books on American and Irish history; former member of the New York Times editorial board
- Michael Klein, art history professor at Kean (1996–1998); New York City art consultant and curator
- Susan MacLaury, health professor, social worker, Emmy and Academy Award-winning producer
- Frank X. McDermott, former trustee of Kean University; New Jersey delegate to the White House Conference on Education, 1955 (Dwight Eisenhower administration); member of the New Jersey General Assembly 1963–1967, 1975–1977 (assistant majority leader, 1965; minority leader, 1966); president of the New Jersey Senate and acting governor of New Jersey, 1969; New Jersey senator, 1967–1973 (Senate majority leader, 1968); Thomas Kean 1977 gubernatorial campaign chairman
- Jim McGreevey, former governor of New Jersey; former ethics professor at Kean University
- Harold Norman Moldenke, former Kean professor; botanist; taxonomist
- Marysa Navarro, historian
- Richard O'Meara, retired brigadier general in the United States Army; Vietnam War combat veteran; lawyer; member of the Judge Advocate General's Corps, U.S. Army; taught at Kean University, Rutgers University-Newark, Monmouth University, and the Division of Global Affairs
- Ryan Spencer Reed, photojournalist; Kean University visiting artist lecturer
- John J. Wooten, playwright, director, and producer; founding member and Producing Artistic Director of Premiere Stages at Kean University
- Xiaobo Yu, Chinese palaeontologist and professor on biological sciences credited with first describing the lobe-finned fish Psarolepis romeri, a transitional species between fish and amphibians
- Raúl Zamudio, curator, art critic, art historian

== Athletic coaches ==
- Nick DiPillo, former assistant coach for the men's basketball team at Kean; assistant coach for the New York Liberty of the WNBA
- Kirk Jellerson, Kean defensive coordinator, 2000–2002; head football coach at Utica College in Utica, New York and Whittier College in Whittier, California

=== Football coaches ===
- John Audino, former head football coach for Kean University, 1990–1991; head football coach for Union College in Schenectady, New York; Notre Dame University football player
- Brian Carlson, Kean Cougars football head coach, 1992–1999
- Charlie Cocuzza, Kean Cougars football head coach (2003–2005); former assistant coach at Montclair State
- Ron San Fillipo, Cougars head coach, 1973–1974; Kean Cougars baseball head coach, 1973–1975
- Dan Garrett, Cougars head coach since 2006
- Jim Hazlett, Cougars head coach, 1980–1986; Susquehanna University and Edinboro University of Pennsylvania
- Glenn Hedden, Cougars head coach, 1987–1988; assistant football coach at Montclair State University
- Drew Gibbs, Cougars head coach, 1989
- Joe Loth, Cougars head coach, 2000–2002; 2009 guest coach for the Saskatchewan Roughriders; current head football coach for Otterbein College in Westerville, Ohio
- Ray Murphy, Cougars head coach, 1977–1979
- Hawley Waterman, first Cougars head coach, 1970–1971
