= Looking for Mr. Goodbar =

Looking for Mr. Goodbar may refer to:

- Looking for Mr. Goodbar (novel), a 1975 novel by Judith Rossner
- Looking for Mr. Goodbar (film), a 1977 film adaptation, starring Diane Keaton
