= Jamie Lee (comedian) =

American comedian and screenwriter

- Born: Dallas, Texas, U.S.
- Education: University of Texas at Austin
- Occupations: Comedian, actress, writer
- Years active: 2010–present
- Television: Ted Lasso; Girl Code; I Love... Crashing; The Wedding Coach
- Spouse: Sam Aronoff (m. 2024)

Jamie Amanda Lee (born March 15, 1983) is an American comedian, actress, and writer best known for Ted Lasso, Girl Code, Crashing, and The Wedding Coach. Lee is a two-time Primetime Emmy Award winner for her work as a producer on Ted Lasso.

== Early life ==
Lee was born and raised in Dallas, Texas. Her mother's family is Jewish and from New Jersey, whereas her father's Texan family is not Jewish. She attended the University of Texas in Austin, Texas, where she studied film, theatre, and screenwriting. After graduating, she relocated to New York City, where she began her career in stand up comedy, writing, and acting.

She cites her comedic influences as David Cross, Todd Barry, Margaret Cho, Nick Swardson, Joan Rivers, Ellen DeGeneres, and Miss Piggy.

== Career ==
While in New York City, Lee worked in the publicity department at Comedy Central before leaving to focus on stand-up comedy. She then served as a writer's assistant for Jerry Seinfeld, Tom Papa, Jeff Cesario, and Chuck Martin on The Marriage Ref. In 2010, Lee got her career break when she made it to the semi-finals on season 7 of NBC's Last Comic Standing. She then booked college tours, a slot on Conan, a recurring guest place at Chelsea Handler's roundtable on Chelsea Lately, and in 2011, a position as a writer on MTV's Ridiculousness. In 2012, Lee was selected as a New Face in Just For Laughs at the Montreal comedy festival.

Lee is best known for her role as a core cast member on the popular MTV show Girl Code. She stated in an interview: "I love, hopefully, being a voice for girls and also connecting and making them feel heard and saying things that resonate with them. That's very important to me and there's no part of me that feels shame or like I'm somehow denying the other sex by speaking as a woman, to women. Because I think the more specific you can be about your experience, just as a human being, the more it appeals to everybody of both genders."

She has appeared as a stand-up comedian on Late Night with Conan O'Brien, The Late Late Show with James Corden, Last Call with Carson Daly, Chelsea Lately, and @midnight. She is the host of the TruTV series 10 Things and the Entertainment Weekly online series Polished.

In December 2016, Lee released her debut book Weddiculous: The Unfiltered Guide to Being a Bride after marrying comedian Dan Black in April of that year. She co-authored the book with comedian Jaqueline Novak. It was named #1 on Bustle Magazine's list of best wedding books in April 2017. The book also garnered praise from James Corden, Nikki Glaser, Pete Holmes, Conan O'Brien, and Phoebe Robinson. The Laugh Button stated: "What Amy Sedaris has done for hospitality and crafting, Jamie Lee now does for weddings."

In 2017, Elle Magazine named her as one of the top 11 comedians to watch that year. She has also been named as one of the "Top Five Comedians Who Should Be Movie Stars" by Nerve, the "Top 18 Women You Should Be Following on Twitter" by The Huffington Post, and the "52 Female Stand-Up Comedians You Need to Know" by Refinery29.

In 2018, she was the female lead on the second season of the HBO series Crashing, for which she was a writer on the first season.

In 2021, Netflix released The Wedding Coach, a reality TV series about wedding planning hosted by Lee.

Lee has been a writer on Ted Lasso since 2020, and has served as an executive producer since its third season.

In 2022, it was announced that Lee would star in the comedy film Plan B, alongside Jon Heder, Tom Berenger and Shannon Elizabeth.

In 2025, Lee made her Edinburgh Festival Fringe debut with the solo show My Friend Katy. The show recounts Lee's investigation, two decades later, into the 2004 death of her best friend Katy. Reviewing the production for Chortle, Steve Bennett awarded it four stars and described it as "a keen, lean piece of tragicomic storytelling in a crossover genre all of its own."

== Filmography ==
=== Film ===
Year	Title	Role	Notes
2013	Goosey's Big Movie	Newscaster 1	Short film
2013	Paradise	Evangelist	
2014	Dan Klein: This Is Comedy	Herself	TV movie
2024	Plan B	Piper Brennan	

=== Television ===
Year	Title	Role	Notes
2010	Last Comic Standing	Herself (Comedian)	2 episodes Semi-finalist
2010	Undateable	Herself	TV mini-series 2 episodes
2011	Ridiculousness	Writer	8 episodes
2011	Caroline's Comedy Club	Herself (Comedian)	
2011	100 Greatest Songs of the 00's	Herself (Comedian)	Episode: September 10, 2011
2012–17	Conan	Herself (Guest) / Herself (Comic Guest)	2 episodes
2013	The Morning After	Actress	Episode: "Doctor's Appointment feat. Jamie Lee"
2013	Big Morning Buzz Live	Herself (Panelist)	2 episodes
2013	Gotham Comedy Live	Herself (Comedian)	Episode: "Maz Jobrani"
2013	Money From Strangers	Herself	4 episodes
2013	New York Stand-Up Show	Herself	Episode: #4.8
2014	Love's a Bitch	Allison / Veronica	12 episodes
2014	The Pete Holmes Show	Writer	8 episodes
2014	Ridiculousness	Herself	Episode: "Jamie Lee"
2014	@midnight	Herself	Episode: #2.14
2013–14	Chelsea Lately	Herself (Round Table)	5 episodes
2015	Rent Control	Amanda	Episode: "Labor Day"
2015	World's Funniest Falls	Herself (Panelist)	2 episodes
2015	Last Call with Carson Daly	Herself (Comedian)	Episode: "Morgan Spurlock/Jamie Lee/Above & Beyond"
2013–15	Girl Code	Herself	75 episodes
2016	Comedy Knockout	Actress	Episode: "All Shaft"
2016	The Late Late Show with James Corden	Herself	Episode: "Sarah Silverman/Taylor Kinney/Alicia Vikander/Jamie Lee"
2016	10 Things	Herself (Host)	Episode: "10 Things You Didn't Know About America"
2016	The Guest List	Herself	Episode: "Michelle Buteau, Jamie Lee and More"
2016	Guy Code vs. Girl Code	Herself	
2017
2017	Talk Show the Game Show	Writer	3 episodes
2017	Watch Party: The Bachelor	Herself	
2017	Poop Talk	Herself	
2018–2019	Crashing	Ali Reissen	11 episodes (also writer)
2020-2023	Ted Lasso	Writer	Episode: "For the Children", "Man City", "Signs"
2021	The Wedding Coach	Herself (Host)	6 episodes

== Awards and nominations ==
Year	Award	Category	Work	Result	Ref.
2021	Writers Guild Award	Comedy Series	Ted Lasso	Won	
2021	Primetime Emmy Award	Outstanding Comedy Series	Ted Lasso	Won	
2022	Primetime Emmy Award	Outstanding Comedy Series	Ted Lasso	Won	
2022	Producers Guild of America Award	Outstanding Producer of Episodic Television, Comedy	Ted Lasso	Won	
2023	Primetime Emmy Award	Outstanding Comedy Series	Ted Lasso	Nominated	
