= Cocuzza =

Cocuzza is an Italian surname. Notable people with the surname include:

- Charlie Cocuzza, American football coach
- Maria Cocuzza (born 1973), Italian gymnast
- Riccardo Cocuzza (born 1993), Italian footballer

== See also ==
- Cocozza
