= Joseph Eve =

Joseph Eve may refer to:

- Joseph Eve (politician) (1784–1843), American politician and diplomat
- Joseph Eve, Certified Public Accountants, an American public accounting firm

== See also ==
- Eve Joseph (born 1953), Canadian poet and author
