= James Sloan =

James Sloan is the name of:

- James Sloan, co-founder of the Orange Institution in 1795
- James F. Sloan (1947–2009), head of US Coast Guard Intelligence
- James Sloan (congressman) (died 1811), United States Congressman from New Jersey
- James Sloan (Latter Day Saints) (1792–1886), early Latter Day Saint and secretary to Joseph Smith, Jr
- James Park Sloan (born 1945), American writer and critic
- James Blanding Sloan (1886–1975), American etcher, printmaker and theatrical designer

== See also ==
- James Sloan Kuykendall (1878–1928), American lawyer and politician in the U.S. state of West Virginia
