= Closing Time: The True Story of the Goodbar Murder =

Book by Lacey Fosburgh

- First edition
- Author: Lacey Fosburgh
- Language: English
- Publisher: Delacorte Press
- Publication date: 1977
- Publication place: United States

Closing Time: The True Story of the "Goodbar" Murder is a 1977 book by Lacey Fosburgh about the murder of Roseann Quinn, a young New York City schoolteacher who reportedly led a "double life" and was murdered in 1973. Fosburgh appropriated the title of Judith Rossner's Looking for Mr. Goodbar, the acclaimed best-selling novel which had been published two years earlier, and subsequently made into a 1977 film, and whose events were followed by a 1983 made-for-TV semi-sequel, Trackdown: Finding the Goodbar Killer, which was largely based on fact.

Closing Time was nominated for the 1978 Edgar Award as Best Fact Crime book, despite Fosburgh's mixing of fact and fiction in a controversial technique she referred to as "interpretive biography." In 1980, she admitted to The New York Times that she had "created scenes or dialogue I think it reasonable and fair to assume could have taken place, perhaps even did."
