= Trackdown: Finding the Goodbar Killer =

- Genre: Crime; Drama; Mystery
- Written by: Albert Ruben
- Directed by: Bill Persky
- Starring: George Segal; Shelley Hack
- Music by: Stephen J. Lawrence
- Country of origin: United States
- Original language: English

Production
- Producers: Sonny Grosso; Larry Jacobson
- Production location: New York City
- Cinematography: Fred Murphy
- Editor: Norman Gay
- Running time: 100 min.
- Production company: Grosso Jacobson

Original release
- Network: CBS
- Release: October 15, 1983

Trackdown: Finding the Goodbar Killer is a television film starring George Segal, Shelley Hack and Tracy Pollan. It first aired on October 15, 1983, on the CBS television network. Produced by Sonny Grosso and Larry Jacobson, the film was directed by Bill Persky.

== Plot ==
The film follows the investigation into the 1973 rape and murder of a young Manhattan school teacher. The film is a made-for-television sequel to the 1977 theatrical film Looking for Mr. Goodbar (although all parts are recast and renamed), which itself was based on Judith Rossner's acclaimed 1975 best-selling novel of the same title. However, Trackdown opens with a disclaimer, disassociating itself from Rossner's novel.

== Cast ==
- George Segal as John Grafton, police detective investigating the murder of Mary Alice Nolan
- Shelley Hack as Logan Gay, schoolteacher for deaf children and Mary Alice's co-worker
- Alan North as Lieutenant Walter Belden
- Barton Heyman as Alan Cahill, John's lover, based on Geary Guest and George Prince (played by Richard Bright in Looking for Mr. Goodbar)
- Steve Allie Collura as Detective Steve Miscelli
- Shannon Presby as John Charles Turner, the killer, based on John Wayne Wilson and Gary Cooper White (played by Tom Berenger in Looking for Mr. Goodbar)
- Jean DeBaer as Betty Grafton, John's estranged wife
- Tracy Pollan as Eileen Grafton, John's daughter
- Marek Johnson as Mary Alice Nolan, the victim, based on Roseann Quinn and Theresa Dunn (played by Diane Keaton in Looking for Mr. Goodbar)

== See also ==
- Looking for Mr. Goodbar (novel) by Judith Rossner
- Closing Time: The True Story of the Goodbar Murder
