= Lacey Fosburgh =

American journalist (1942–1993)

- Born: October 3, 1942; Manhattan, New York, U.S.
- Died: January 11, 1993 (aged 50); San Francisco, California, U.S.
- Occupations: Journalist, author
- Notable work: Closing Time: The True Story of the "Goodbar" Murder (1977)
- Spouses: Marc Libarle (m. 1973; div. 1975); David Harris (m. 1977)
- Children: 1

Lacey Fosburgh (October 3, 1942 – January 11, 1993) was an American journalist, author, and academic best known for her controversial book, Closing Time: The True Story of the Goodbar Murder (1977).

== Early life ==
Fosburgh was born in Manhattan, New York, U.S., to the journalist Hugh Whitney Fosburgh, author of View from the Air and other books, and his wife, Helen Edwards Fosburgh. She graduated from the Brearley School in Manhattan and Sarah Lawrence College.

== Career ==
She began her writing career for The New York Times, where she worked as a staff reporter from 1968 to 1973. After leaving the Times, Fosburgh continued to work as a freelance journalist for that publication and others, covering the Patty Hearst/Symbionese Liberation Army case from 1974 to 1976, and the Peoples Temple case in 1978. She was also one of the few people to interview reclusive author J. D. Salinger, in 1974. She taught journalism at the University of California at Berkeley.

In 1977, Fosburgh—appropriating the title of Judith Rossner's acclaimed best-selling novel, Looking for Mr. Goodbar (1975)--published her first book, Closing Time: The True Story of the "Goodbar" Murder, the story of the 1973 slaying of young schoolteacher Roseann Quinn, which Fosburgh had covered for The New York Times. The book was selected by both the Literary Guild and Doubleday Book Club, and received a 1978 Edgar Award nomination for Best Fact Crime book. Although Truman Capote remarked that the book proved Fosburgh "a skillful, selective reporter and also a literary artist", her mixing of fact and fiction (in a technique she called "interpretive biography") proved controversial. In 1980, Fosburgh admitted to The New York Times that she had "created scenes or dialogue I think it reasonable and fair to assume could have taken place, perhaps even did."

Her second book, Old Money (1983), was a novel that was understood to be largely autobiographical, about growing up in a wealthy, troubled family. Her third book was India Gate (1991), a fictional family saga and mystery involving the children of American expatriates in India.

== Personal life ==
Fosburgh was married to Marc Libarle from 1973 to 1975. In 1977, she married the activist and author David Harris, and they had one child, Sophie. Fosburgh died aged 50 on January 11, 1993, of breast cancer, at California Pacific Hospital in San Francisco.

== Bibliography ==
- Closing Time: The True Story of the Goodbar Murder (1977) (ISBN 0-440-01371-2)
- Old Money (1983) (ISBN 0-385-15310-4)
- India Gate (1991) (ISBN 0-517-58493-X)

== Other works ==
- "J. D. Salinger Speaks About His Silence", November 3, 1974, The New York Times interview with Salinger.
