= Financial Crimes Enforcement Network =

Bureau of the U.S. Treasury Department

Agency overview
- Formed: April 25, 1990; 36 years ago
- Headquarters: Vienna, Virginia
- Annual budget: $114.222 million (2018)
- Agency executive: Director, Andrea Gacki
- Parent agency: Office of Terrorism and Financial Intelligence
- Website: fincen.gov

The Financial Crimes Enforcement Network (FinCEN) is a bureau within the United States Department of the Treasury that collects and analyzes information about financial transactions to combat domestic and international money laundering, terrorist financing, and other financial crimes.

== Mission ==
FinCEN's stated mission is to "safeguard the financial system from illicit activity, counter money laundering and the financing of terrorism, and promote national security through strategic use of financial authorities and the collection, analysis, and dissemination of financial intelligence." FinCEN serves as the U.S. Financial Intelligence Unit (FIU) and is one of 147 FIUs making up the Egmont Group of Financial Intelligence Units. It is a network bringing people and information together, by coordinating information sharing with law enforcement agencies, regulators and other partners in the financial industry. The agency insignia includes its name, FinCEN, spelled out in binary to "represent the financial data FinCEN uses" in its work.

== History ==
FinCEN was established by Treasury Order 105-08 on April 25, 1990. In May 1994, its mission expanded to involve regulatory responsibilities. In October 1994, Treasury's Office of Financial Enforcement merged with FinCEN. On September 26, 2002, after passage of Title III of the PATRIOT Act, Treasury Order 180-01 designated FinCEN as an official bureau within the Department of the Treasury.

Since 1995, FinCEN has employed the FinCEN Artificial Intelligence System (FAIS).

In September 2012, FinCEN's information technology called FinCEN Portal and Query System, migrated with 11 years of data into FinCEN Query, a search engine similar to Google. It is a "one stop shop" [sic] accessible via the FinCEN Portal allowing broad searches across more fields than before and returning more results. Since September 2012 FinCEN generates 4 new reports: Suspicious Activity Report (SAR), Currency Transaction Report (CTR), the Designation of Exempt Person (DOEP), and Registered Money Service Business (RMSB).

== Organization ==
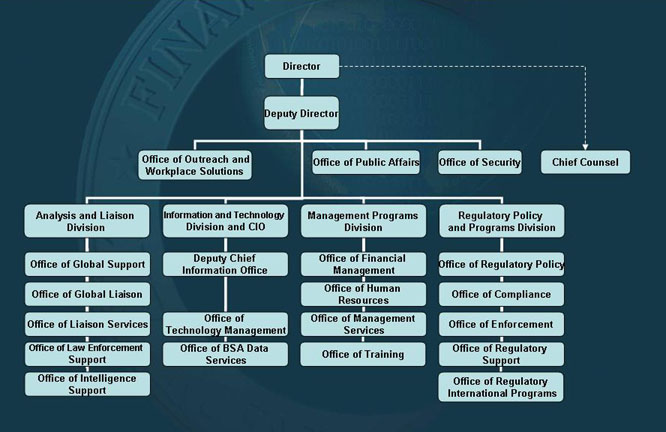
FinCEN organization chart

As of November 2013, FinCEN employed approximately 340 people, mostly intelligence professionals with expertise in the financial industry, illicit finance, financial intelligence, the AML/CFT (anti-money laundering / combating the financing of terrorism) regulatory regime, computer technology, and enforcement". The majority of the staff are permanent FinCEN personnel, with about 20 long-term detailees assigned from 13 different regulatory and law enforcement agencies. FinCEN shares information with dozens of intelligence agencies, including the Bureau of Alcohol, Tobacco, and Firearms; the Drug Enforcement Administration; the Federal Bureau of Investigation; the U.S. Secret Service; the Internal Revenue Service; the Customs Service; and the U.S. Postal Inspection Service.

=== FinCEN directors ===
- Brian M. Bruh (1990–1993)
- Stanley E. Morris (1994–1998)
- James F. Sloan (April 1999 – October 2003)
- William J. Fox (December 2003 – February 2006)
- Robert Werner Duemling (March 2006 – December 2006)
- James H. Freis, Jr. (March 2007 – August 2012)
- Jennifer Shasky Calvery (September 2012 – May 2016)
- Jamal El-Hindi (Acting, June 2016 – November 2017)
- Kenneth Blanco (November 2017 – April 2021)
- Michael Mosier (Acting, April 2021 – August 2021)
- Himamauli Das (Acting, August 2021 – September 2023)
- Andrea Gacki (July 2023 – Present)

== 314 program ==
The 2001 USA PATRIOT Act required the Secretary of the Treasury to create a secure network for the transmission of information to enforce the relevant regulations. FinCEN's regulations under Section 314(a) enable federal law enforcement agencies, through FinCEN, to reach out to more than 45,000 points of contact at more than 27,000 financial institutions to locate accounts and transactions of persons that may be involved in terrorist financing and/or money laundering. A web interface allows the person(s) designated in §314(a)(3)(A) to register and transmit information to FinCEN. The partnership between the financial community and law enforcement allows disparate bits of information to be identified, centralized, and rapidly evaluated.

== Hawala ==
In 2003, FinCEN disseminated information on "informal value transfer systems" (IVTS), including hawala, a network of people receiving money for the purpose of making the funds payable to a third party in another geographic location, generally taking place outside of the conventional banking system through non-bank financial institutions or other business entities whose primary business activity may not be the transmission of money. On September 1, 2010, FinCEN issued a guidance on IVTS referencing United States v. Banki and hawala.

== Office of Special Investigations ==
The Enforcement Division is structured into three offices: Compliance and Enforcement, Special Measures, and Special Investigations. The Office of Special Investigations is responsible for investigating unauthorized BSA disclosures and providing criminal investigatory expertise and support to the rest of the division. The Office is staffed by FinCEN's special agents.

== Virtual currencies ==
In July 2011, FinCEN added "other value that substitutes for currency" to its definition of money services businesses in preparation for adapting the respective rule to virtual currencies. On March 18, 2013, FinCEN issued a guidance regarding virtual currencies, according to which, exchangers and administrators, but not users of convertible virtual currency are considered money transmitters, and must comply with rules to prevent money laundering/terrorist financing ("AML/CFT") and other forms of financial crime, by record-keeping, reporting and registering with FinCEN. Jennifer Shasky Calvery, director of FinCEN said, "Virtual currencies are subject to the same rules as other currencies. ... Basic money services business rules apply here."

At a November 2013 Senate hearing, Calvery stated, "It is in the best interest of virtual currency providers to comply with these regulations for a number of reasons. First is the idea of corporate responsibility," contrasting Bitcoin's understanding of a peer to peer system bypassing corporate financial institutions. She stated that FinCEN collaborates with the Federal Financial Institutions Examination Council, a congressionally-chartered forum called the "Bank Secrecy Act (BSA) Advisory Group" and BSA Working Group to review and discuss new regulations and guidance, with the FBI-led "Virtual Currency Emerging Threats Working Group" (VCET) formed in early 2012, the FDIC-led "Cyber Fraud Working Group", the Terrorist Financing & Financial Crimes-led "Treasury Cyber Working Group", and with a community of other financial intelligence units. According to the Department of Justice, VCET members represent the FBI, the Drug Enforcement Administration, multiple U.S. Attorney's Offices, and the Criminal Division's Asset Forfeiture and Money Laundering Section and Computer Crime and Intellectual Property Section.

In 2021, amendments to the Bank Secrecy Act and the federal AML/CTF framework officially incorporated existing FinCEN guidelines on digital assets. The legislation was updated to encompass "value that substitutes for currency," reinforcing FinCEN's authority over digital assets. As a result, exchanges dealing in these assets were required to register with FinCEN and adhere to specific reporting and recordkeeping obligations for transactions involving certain types of digital assets. In 2021, FinCEN received 1,137,451 Suspicious Activity Reports (SARs) from both traditional financial institutions and cryptocurrency trading entities. Within this total, there were reports of 7,914 suspicious cyber events and 284,989 potential money laundering activities. In 2026, the US Treasury proposed enhanced anti-money laundering and sanctions compliance requirements for payment stablecoin issuers, including obligations related to the Bank Secrecy Act, suspicious activity reporting, and Office of Foreign Assets Control compliance.

== Beneficial Ownership Information Reports ==
FinCEN is the regulatory agency tasked with overseeing the Beneficial Ownership Information Reporting (BOIR) system in the U.S. This responsibility was established under the Corporate Transparency Act (CTA), which mandates that certain business entities must disclose information about their beneficial owners to FinCEN. CTA aims to enhance transparency and combat financial crimes by preventing the use of anonymous shell companies for illicit purposes. On December 3, 2024, the U.S. District Court for the Eastern District of Texas issued a preliminary injunction against nationwide implementation of the CTA, citing concerns about its constitutionality and impact on small businesses. Treasury filed a notice of appeal on December 5, 2024.

FinCEN administers the BOIR system to collect and maintain accurate records of beneficial ownership information. This information includes details such as the names, addresses, dates of birth, and identification numbers of individuals who ultimately own or control companies. By centralizing this data, FinCEN supports law enforcement efforts to investigate and prosecute financial crimes, ensuring greater accountability and integrity within the corporate sector.

== Controversies ==
In 2009, the GAO found "opportunities" to improve "interagency and state examination coordination", noting that the federal banking regulators issued an interagency examination manual, that SEC, CFTC, and their respective self-regulatory organizations developed Bank Secrecy Act (BSA) examination modules, and that FinCEN and IRS examining nonbank financial institutions issued an examination manual for money services businesses. Therefore, multiple regulators examine compliance of the BSA across industries and for some larger holding companies even within the same institution. Regulators need to promote greater consistency, coordination and information-sharing, reduce unnecessary regulatory burden, and find concerns across industries. FinCEN estimated that it would have data access agreements with 80 percent of state agencies that conduct BSA examinations after 2012.

Since FinCEN's inception in 1990, the Electronic Frontier Foundation in San Francisco has debated its benefits compared to its threat to privacy. FinCEN does not disclose how many Suspicious Activity Reports result in investigations, indictments or convictions, and no studies exist to tally how many reports are filed on innocent people. FinCEN and money laundering laws have been criticized for being expensive and relatively ineffective while violating Fourth Amendment rights, as an investigator may use FinCEN's database to investigate people instead of crimes.

It has also been alleged that FinCEN's regulations against structuring are enforced unfairly and arbitrarily; for example, it was reported in 2012 that small businesses selling at farmers' markets have been targeted, while politically connected people like Eliot Spitzer were not prosecuted. Spitzer's reasons for structuring were described as "innocent".

In February 2019, it was reported that Mary Daly, the oldest daughter of United States Attorney General William Barr, is to leave her position at the United States Deputy Attorney General's office for a FinCEN position.

In September 2020, findings based on a set of 2,657 documents including 2121 suspicious activity reports (SARs) leaked from FinCEN were published as the FinCEN Files. The leaked documents showed that although both FinCEN and the banks that filed SARs knew about billions of dollars in dirty money being moved through the banks, both did very little to prevent the transactions.

== In popular culture ==
The 2016 film The Accountant features a FinCEN investigation into the title character.

In the first episode of the 2017 Netflix show Ozark, FinCEN is mentioned as one of the agencies (along with the DEA, ATF, and FBI) active in monitoring cartel activity in Chicago.

The third series of the 2023 Netflix show The Night Agent features a character working (or previously worked) for FinCEN, whose investigations are a component of the overarching plot of this series.

== See also ==
- Casino regulations under the Bank Secrecy Act
- Currency transaction report
- FINTRAC – Canada's equivalent to FinCEN
- Timeline of post-election transition following Russian interference in the 2016 United States elections
- Timeline of investigations into Trump and Russia (January–June 2017)
- Timeline of investigations into Trump and Russia (July–December 2018)
- Title 31 of the Code of Federal Regulations
- List of financial supervisory authorities by country
