= Plan B (2024 film) =

2024 American comedy movie

PLAN B
- Directed by: Brandon Tamburri
- Written by: Brandon Tamburri; Jean S. Monpère
- Produced by: Brandon Tamburri; Erika Hampson; DJ Dodd
- Starring: Jamie Lee; Jon Heder; Shannon Elizabeth; Tom Berenger
- Cinematography: Mike Magilnick
- Edited by: Colleen Halsey
- Music by: Billy Goodrum
- Production company: Joke Zero
- Distributed by: Quiver Distribution
- Release date: September 27, 2024
- Country: United States
- Language: English

Plan B is a 2024 American comedy film directed by Brandon Tamburri. The film stars Jamie Lee, Jon Heder, Tom Berenger, Shannon Elizabeth, Kate Flannery, and Vernon Davis. The plot follows a young woman (Lee) who becomes pregnant after a one night stand with her awkward neighbor (Heder), before deciding to quickly sleep with a successful businessman and tell him he's the father of her unborn baby.

== Plot ==
"After a fun night out, a rebellious thirty-something, Piper Brennan (Lee) drunkenly sleeps with Evan Ebert (Heder), her awkward neighbor that she hardly knows, and winds up pregnant. When she attempts to tell Evan the news, she quickly realizes that he is not the type of man that she wants to start a family with. Going against the advice of her roommate and best friend, Maya (Agarwal), Piper opts to keep the pregnancy a secret until she can find a more successful guy who she can sleep with and ultimately start a “family” with.

After a few failed and comical attempts at finding a match, Piper stumbles into Cameron Cassidy (Lombardi), a successful investment banker who is a regular at the coffee shop that she works at. Everything appears to be going according to plan as Cameron seems to quickly fall for Piper and be onboard for the pregnancy. However, Piper’s evil scheme starts to quickly unravel when she begins to second guess herself and realize that she might be making the biggest mistake of her life."

== Cast ==
- Jamie Lee as Piper Brennan
- Jon Heder as Evan Ebert
- Tom Berenger as Joe Cassidy
- Shannon Elizabeth as Anne McNally
- Kate Flannery as Jane Brantley
- Vernon Davis as Steve
- Michael Lombardi as Cameron Cassidy
- Subhah Agarwal as Maya
- Daniel K. Isaac as Travis

== Production ==
The project was announced in July 2022, when Deadline Hollywood revealed that Joke Zero and Future Proof Films had wrapped production on Plan B. Plan B was described as a romantic comedy that was filmed in New Jersey. It marked the directorial debut of Brandon Tamburri as well as the first film produced under his newly launched company Joke Zero.

In October 2023, Deadline Hollywood revealed that Premiere Entertainment Group had boarded Plan B and would be serving as the film's sales agent. Premiere launched worldwide sales at the American Film Market in 2023.

In May 2024, the North American rights to Plan B were acquired by Quiver Distribution at the Cannes Film Festival.

In September 2024, Joke Zero launched their own podcast network, with their first podcast series being the Joke Zero Podcast. The 20 episode first season of the Joke Zero Podcast gives a behind the scenes look at the making of Plan B as well as other aspects of independent filmmaking. The series was hosted by Anna Roisman who also plays a supporting role in Plan B. Guests include Jamie Lee, Jon Heder, Tom Berenger, Kate Flannery, and several other cast and crew members associated with the film.

== Release ==
Plan B was released in the United States on September 27, 2024. The film opened in 9 cities while simultaneously releasing on several Video On Demand platforms. Plan B originally had its world premiere at the 2024 Mammoth Film Festival where Jamie Lee was nominated for best actress and Tamburri was nominated for best director. Plan B was also released in Russia, the Middle East, Benelux, South Korea, Taiwan, and on international airline flights.

== Reception ==
=== Critical response ===
Plan B was a critical success, scoring an 82% Tomatometer (critic score) on Rotten Tomatoes. Bobby LePire of Film Threat wrote: "Plan B is a silly premise that works thanks to the dialogue and performances. There’s real heart to be found at the core, and Lee mines all that she’s got to bring that and the comedy forth. She’s supported by strong actors on all sides of her, and the ending leaves all watching feeling good without ever feeling trite." Eddie Harrison of Film Authority gave the film 4/5 stars and praised Jon Heder's performance, writing: "But the big winner here is actually Heder, plying with a different kind of charm to his Napoleon Dynamite heyday." Film Authority also ranked Plan B as one of the top twenty independent films of 2024.
