= Cocozza =

Cocozza is a surname. Notable people with the surname include:

- Alfred Arnold Cocozza (1921–1959), stage name Mario Lanza, American tenor, actor and Hollywood film star
- Enrico Cocozza (1921–2009), Scottish filmmaker
- Frankie Cocozza (born 1993), English singer who participated in The X Factor in 2011
- Marc Cocozza (born 1981), Scottish footballer

== See also ==
- Cocuzza
- Cucuzza
