= Andrea Gacki =

American attorney

Director of the Financial Crimes Enforcement Network (FinCEN)
- Incumbent
- Assumed office September 2023
- Preceded by: Himamauli “Him” Das (acting)

Director of the Office of Foreign Assets Control (OFAC)
- In office September 2018 – September 2023

Personal details
- Education: University of Michigan-Ann Arbor; University of Michigan Law School

Andrea Gacki is an American attorney. She currently serves as Director of the Financial Crimes Enforcement Network (FinCEN), a bureau within the U.S. Treasury Department tasked with combating financial crimes. Previously, she directed the Office of Foreign Assets Control (OFAC).

== Education ==
Gacki holds a BA from the University of Michigan-Ann Arbor and a Juris Doctor from University of Michigan Law School.

== Career ==
Gacki began her career as a trial attorney in the Federal Programs Branch of the Department of Justice's Civil Division. She served in the administrations of George W. Bush, Barack Obama, Donald Trump, and Joe Biden.

=== Director of OFAC (2018-2023) ===
Gacki became OFAC Director in September 2018. From January 2021 to December 2021, Gacki was acting Under Secretary of the Treasury for Terrorism and Financial Intelligence (TFI), overseeing both the Financial Crimes Enforcement Network (FinCEN) and the Office of Foreign Assets Control (OFAC). During her tenure, Gacki helped craft sanctions against Russia in the aftermath of the 2022 invasion of Ukraine.

=== Director of FinCEN (2023-present) ===
In July 2023, the Treasury Department announced that Gacki would lead the FinCEN beginning in September 2023, succeeding Himamauli “Him” Das, who had led the bureau temporarily since 2021. The American Banker listed Gacki as one of the "24 people who will change banking in 2024".
