= Alan North =

American actor (1920–2000)

- North in Police Squad!, 1982
- Born: December 23, 1920; New York City, U.S.
- Died: January 19, 2000 (aged 79); Port Jefferson, New York, U.S.
- Years active: 1953–2000
- Spouse: June North
- Children: 2

Alan North (December 23, 1920 – January 19, 2000) was an American actor.

== Early life ==
North was born in Bronx, New York, and joined the United States Navy during the Second World War.

== Career ==
After the war, he became a stage manager and made his Broadway debut in 1955 in Plain and Fancy.

His film career included roles in Plaza Suite (1971), Serpico (1973), The Formula (1980), Trackdown: Finding the Goodbar Killer (1983), Thief of Hearts (1984), Highlander (1986), Act of Vengeance (1986), Billy Galvin (1986), The Fourth Protocol (1987), Lean on Me (1989), See No Evil, Hear No Evil (1989), Glory (1989) and The Long Kiss Goodnight (1996). On television, he played Captain Ed Hocken in the 1982 television series Police Squad!. He also appeared on the soap opera Another World in the recurring role of Captain Sean Delaney from 1984 to 1988. His last stage performance was in 1999, in Lake Hollywood.

== Personal life ==
North and his wife June North had two daughters, Alexandra Jackson and Victoria North.

== Death ==
North died of lung and kidney cancer in a hospital in Port Jefferson, New York on January 19, 2000, at the age of 79.

== Filmography ==
=== Film ===
Year	Title	Role	Notes
1966	Unholy Matrimony	Mr. M. - First Swinging Husband	Uncredited
1971	Plaza Suite	Mr. Eisler	
1972	Bordellet	Julius' ældste søn	
1973	Serpico	Brown	
1979	...And Justice for All.	Deputy Sheriff	
1980	The Formula	Nolan	
1984	Thief of Hearts	Sweeney	
1986	Highlander	Lt. Frank Moran	
1986	Billy Galvin	George	
1986	The Christmas Star	Captain Whittaker	
1987	The Fourth Protocol	Govershin	
1987	Rachel River	Beske	
1989	Lean on Me	Mayor Don Bottman	
1989	See No Evil, Hear No Evil	Braddock	
1989	Penn & Teller Get Killed	Old Cop	
1989	Glory	John Albion Andrew	
1990	Crazy People	Judge	
1993	Twenty Bucks	Bruce Adams	
1995	The Jerky Boys: The Movie	Micky Crump	
1995	Cafe Society	Frank Hogan	
1996	The Long Kiss Goodnight	Earl	
1996	I'm Not Rappaport	Grocery Customer	
1999	Abilene	Jarvisn Brown	
1999	I'll Take You There	Max	

=== Television ===
Year	Title	Role	Notes
1950	Rocky King Detective	Officer North	Episode: "The Trunk"
1953	The Doctor	Fred	Episode: "Treasure Island"
1956	The Big Story	FBI Agent	Episode: "Mass Murder: Flight 169"
1963	Lawbreakers	Nils Tvedt	Episode: "Westchester County, New York: October 4 - Police Officer Killed; Manhunt Under Way"
1968	NET Playhouse	Brent	Episode: "The 39th Witness"
1977	The Deadliest Season	Detective Forscher	Television film
1981–1982	Love, Sidney	Judge Mort Harris	18 episodes
1982	Muggable Mary, Street Cop	Mary's Father	Television film
1982	Police Squad!	Capt. Ed Hocken	6 episodes
1982	Texas	Fire Chief	Episode #1.555
1982	The Powers of Matthew Star	Mr. Kraft	Episode: "Genius"
1982, 1984	Hill Street Blues	Krebs / Barto	2 episodes
1983	All My Children	Mr. Porter	Episode dated 21 January 1983
1983	Trackdown: Finding the Goodbar Killer	Lieutenant Walter Belden	Television film
1983	ABC Afterschool Special	Otto Rhinehart	Episode: "The Hand Me Down Kid"
1984	Newhart	Bill Rivers	Episode: "Leave It to the Beavers"
1984	American Playhouse	Karl Mundt	Episode: "Concealed Enemies, Part I: Suspicion"
1985	The Cosby Show	Judge	Episode: "Clair's Case"
1985	ABC Weekend Special	Skeezer	Episode: "The Adventures of Con Sawyer and Hucklemary Finn"
1985	Kate & Allie	Mr Sloan	4 episodes
1986	Act of Vengeance	Albert Pass	Television film
1986	Tough Cookies	Father McCaskey	6 episodes
1986	Liberty	Ulysses S. Grant	Television film
1986	Spenser: For Hire	Chief Hollis Cushing	Episode: "White Night"
1987	Another World	Captain Delaney	Episode #1.5762
1987	Bennett Brothers	Manny Bennett	Television film
1987	Everything's Relative	Uncle Jack	Episode: "Hit the Road, Jack"
1988	Clinton and Nadine	Detective Rayburn	Television film
1989	Guiding Light	Jack Bauer	Episode #1.10747
1990	Kojak: It's Always Something	Harvey Schoenbrun	Television film
1991	Eyes of a Witness	Doyle	Television film
1991	Darrow	Harrison Gray Otis	Television film
1991–1999	Law & Order	Terry Barrick / Jimmy Scanlon / Reilly	3 episodes
1993	Alex Haley's Queen	Bishop	Episode #1.3
1993	Family Album	Dr. Sid Lerner	6 episodes

== Stage ==
Year	Title	Role(s)	Notes	Ref.
1955	Plain and Fancy	understudy Isaac Miller	Broadway debut also assistant stage manager	
1959	Requiem for a Nun	understudy Governor, Pete, Mr. Tubbs	also stage manager	
1960	Fiorello!	Floyd: a cop	replacement	
1964	Dylan	A Bartender	replacement	
1964	Never Live Over a Pretzel Factory	The Inspector		
1965	Barefoot in the Park	Telephone Man, understudy Victor Velasco		
1966	The Odd Couple	Murray, understudy Oscar Madison		
1967	Spofford	George		
1968	Plaza Suite	standby Sam Nash, Jesse Kiplinger, Roy Hubley		
1970	Plaza Suite	standby Sam Nash, Jesse Kiplinger, Roy Hubley		
1971	Promises, Promises	Dr. Dreyfuss		
1973	The Prisoner of Second Avenue	Harry Edison, understudy Mel Edison		
1977	Scribes	Reg		
1978	Annie Get Your Gun	Chief Sitting Bull		
1979	The Music Man	Mayor Shinn		
1980	The American Clock	Durant, Sheriff, Piano Mover, Toland		
1983	Marilyn: An American Fable	Studio Head		
1992	Conversations With My Father	Nick	replacement	
1999	Lake Hollywood	Uncle Ambrose		
