= David Harris (activist) =

American journalist and activist (1946–2023)

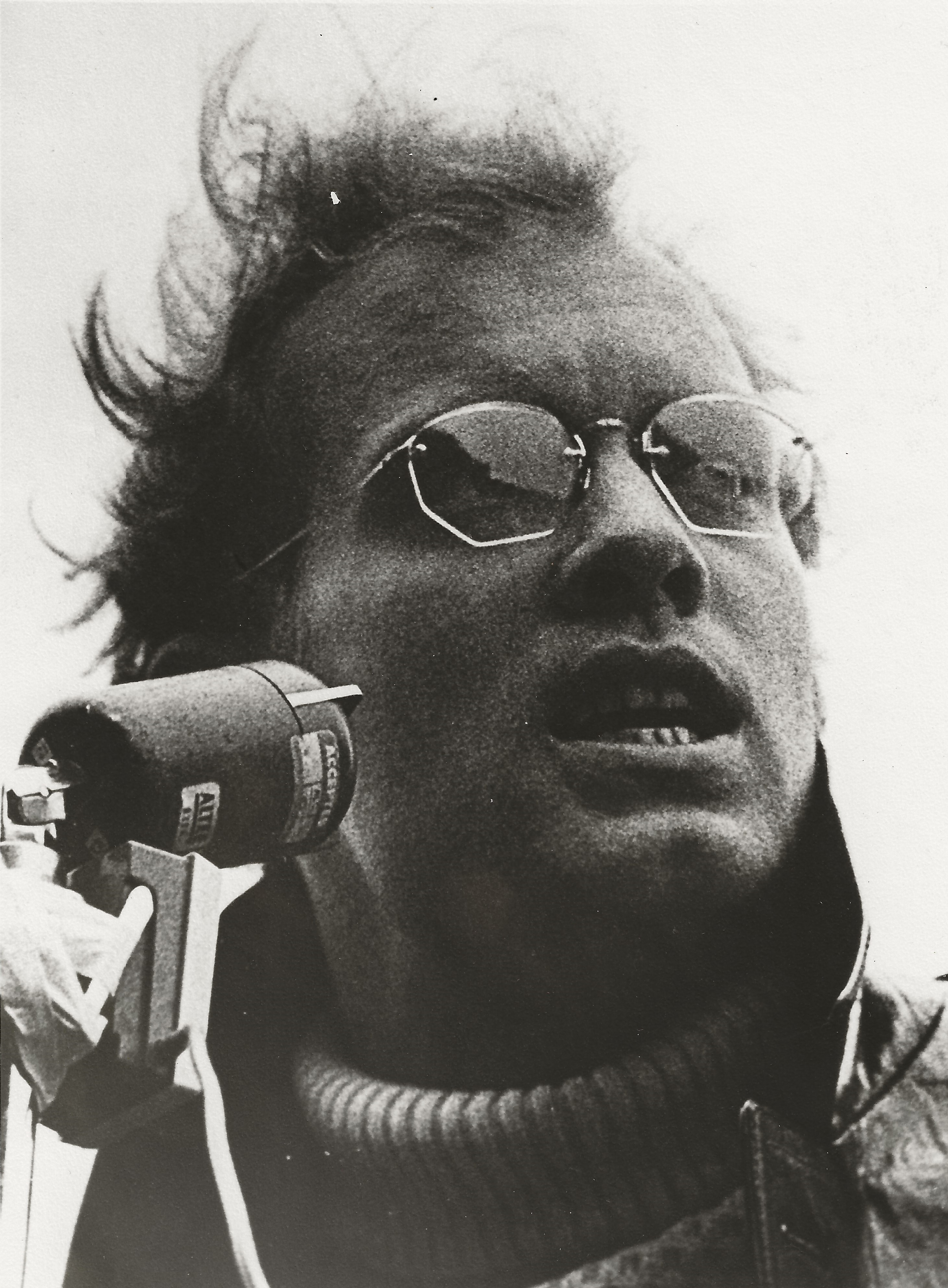
- Harris in 1968
- Born: David Victor Harris; February 28, 1946; Fresno, California, U.S
- Died: February 6, 2023 (aged 76); Mill Valley, California, U.S.
- Occupations: Journalist and activist
- Spouses: Joan Baez (m. 1968; div. 1973); Lacey Fosburgh (m. 1977; died 1993); Cheri Forrester (m. 2011)
- Children: 2

David Victor Harris (February 28, 1946 – February 6, 2023) was an American journalist and activist. After becoming an icon in the movement against the Vietnam War, organizing civil disobedience against military conscription and refusing orders to report for military duty, for which he was imprisoned for almost two years, Harris went on to a 50-year career as a journalist and author, reporting national and international stories.

== Early life and education ==
Harris was born in Fresno, California, on February 28, 1946. His father, Clifton G. Harris Jr., was a lawyer specializing in real estate. His mother, Elaine Jensen Harris, was a housewife and devout Christian Scientist. His brother, Clifton G. Harris III, was 18 months older.

The first of his family to settle in Fresno was his great-grandfather, Levi Barringer. His maternal grandfather, Daniel Jensen, was a master woodworker at the Fresno Planing Mill. His paternal grandfather, Clifton G. Harris Sr., ran a trunk line railroad that carried ore out of the Kennecott Copper mines in Magna, Utah until he retired and moved in across the street from David's home.

David Harris and his brother both attended Fresno public schools. At Fresno High School, Harris was a football letterman, an honor student and a champion debater. Named Fresno High School "Boy of the Year" upon his graduation in 1963, Harris was admitted to Stanford University on scholarship and soon became involved in the Civil Rights Movement. He was elected student body president at Stanford in the spring of 1966.

== Draft resistance ==
In 1967, Harris was one of those who founded The Resistance, an organization advocating civil disobedience against military conscription and against the war the conscription system fed. Through 1967 and 1968, The Resistance staged a series of public draft card returns—an action punishable by up to five years in prison—at which some ten thousand young men confronted the government with their disobedience and courted arrest.

Harris himself was ordered to report for military service in January 1968 and refused. He was indicted almost immediately and charged with felony "disobedience of a lawful order of induction" and tried in federal court in San Francisco in May 1968. He was convicted and sentenced to three years in prison, with the judge's admonition that "you may be right but you're going to be punished."

After a year of unsuccessfully appealing his conviction, Harris was remanded to "the custody of the Attorney General" in July 1969 and incarcerated in the Federal Prison System where he spent twenty months before being paroled; he spent one month in San Francisco County Jail, seven months in the Federal Prison Camp, Safford, Arizona, and twelve months in the Federal Correctional Institution, La Tuna, Texas. After his release on March 15, 1971, Harris continued organizing against the Vietnam War until peace agreements were signed in March 1973.

Harris ran for Congress in 1976 as the Democratic Party candidate against Republican incumbent Rep. Pete McCloskey, who was known nationally for his proposal for mandatory national service. Harris spoke against the resumption of Selective Service registration and in support of draft registration resisters in the 1980s and after.

Harris is featured in the 2020 documentary film The Boys Who Said NO!, which highlights the story of draft resistance during the Vietnam War.

== Journalism ==
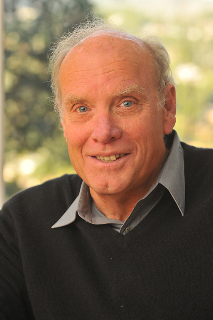
Harris at home, Mill Valley, California, 2005

In March 1973, Jann Wenner, the founder and publisher of the magazine Rolling Stone, gave Harris a tryout with the magazine. The result marked the beginning of his more than 40-year career as a national and international magazine journalist. In 1978, Harris signed a contributing editor contract with the New York Times Magazine, where he worked for the next decade. After his stint with The Times, Harris concentrated on writing books, publishing eleven non-fiction books and one novel.

== Personal life ==
=== Relationship with Joan Baez ===
In October 1967, folk musician Joan Baez, her mother, and nearly 70 other women were arrested at the Oakland, California, Armed Forces Induction Center for blocking its doorways to prevent entrance by young inductees, and in support of young men who refused military induction. They were incarcerated in the Santa Rita Jail.

David Harris and Joan Baez met when he went to her home in Carmel Valley to solicit a donation for The Resistance.

The two later formed a close bond and Baez moved into his draft-resistance commune in the hills above Stanford, California. The pair had known each other for three months when they decided to marry. After confirming the news to the Associated Press, media outlets began dedicating ample press to the impending nuptials (at one point, Time magazine referred to the event as the "Wedding of the Century").

After finding a pacifist preacher and a church outfitted with peace signs and writing a blend of Episcopalian and Quaker wedding vows, Baez and Harris married in New York City on March 26, 1968. Her friend Judy Collins sang at the ceremony. After the wedding, Baez and Harris moved into a home in Los Altos Hills, California, on 10 acres (4.0 hectares) of land called "Struggle Mountain", part of a commune, where they tended gardens and were strict vegetarians.

A short time later, Harris refused induction into the armed forces and was indicted. On July 16, 1969, Harris was taken by federal marshals to prison. Baez was visibly pregnant in public in the months that followed, especially at the Woodstock Festival, where she performed a handful of songs in the early morning.

Their son Gabriel was born on December 2, 1969. Harris was released from prison in Texas after 15 months, but the couple separated three months after his release and they divorced amicably in 1973. They shared custody of Gabriel, who lived primarily with Baez. Baez and Harris remained on friendly terms throughout the years; they reunited on-camera for the 2009 American Masters documentary for PBS.

=== Subsequent relationships ===
Harris remarried in 1977 to New York Times reporter and novelist Lacey Fosburgh. Their daughter Sophie was born in 1983. Fosburgh died of complications from breast cancer in 1993.

In 1996, Harris began a relationship with physician Cheri Forrester. They married in 2011, and resided in Mill Valley, California.

=== Death ===
Harris died from lung cancer at his home in Mill Valley on February 6, 2023, at the age of 76.

== Bibliography ==
=== Non-fiction ===
- Goliath (Sidereal Press & Richard W. Baron Co., 1970), a memoir of Harris's work with the peace movement and his trial for draft resistance.
- Coming Out, with Joan Baez Harris and photographs by Bob Fitch (Pocket Books, 1971)
- I Shoulda Been Home Yesterday: Twenty Months In Prison for Not Killing Anybody (Delacorte Press / Seymour Lawrence, 1976), an account of Harris's imprisonment.
- Dreams Die Hard: Three Men's Journey Through The Sixties (St. Martin's / Marek, 1982), the story of three men who were all friends in the anti-war movement, one of whom ended up killing one of the others 10 years later.
- The League: the Rise and Decline of the NFL (1986), recounts the struggle for power between the owners and commissioner of the National Football League.
- The Last Stand: the War Between Wall Street and Main Street Over California's Ancient Redwoods (Times Books, 1996; Sierra Club Books paperback ed. 1997), an account of the takeover of a northern California lumber company and the environmental war it set off.
- Our War: What We Did In Vietnam and What It Did To Us (Times Books, 1996), Harris, at age 50, revisits the Vietnam War.
- Shooting The Moon: The True Story of an American Manhunt Unlike Any Other, Ever (Little, Brown & Co., 2001), explores the investigation and arrest of General Manuel Noriega, dictator of Panama.
- The Crisis: The President, the Prophet and the Shah--1979 and the Coming of Militant Islam (Little, Brown & Co., 2004), recreates the Iran hostage crisis on its 25th anniversary.
- The Genius: How Bill Walsh Reinvented Football and Created an NFL Dynasty (2008), tracks the career of the football coach Bill Walsh.
- My Country Tis of Thee: Reporting, Sallies, and Other Confessions (2020), a collection of Harris's magazine and other short-form non-fiction.

=== Fiction ===
- The Last Scam (Delacorte Press / Seymour Lawrence, 1981), a novel about marijuana smugglers in the state of Oaxaca, Mexico.

== See also ==
- List of peace activists
