= Casino regulations under the Bank Secrecy Act =

Casino regulation in the United States

Casinos in the United States which generate more than $1,000,000 in annual gaming revenues are required to report certain currency transactions to assist the Financial Crimes Enforcement Network (FinCEN) of the Internal Revenue Service (IRS) in uncovering money laundering activities and other financial crimes (including terrorist financing).

Although Title 31, also known as the Bank Secrecy Act, was originally focused on financial institutions, criminal use of banking services located within casinos created a need for additional regulations that were specific to casinos. Because large sums of currency are transacted through slot machines, gaming tables, automatic change machines, retail operations and the cage (banks), and with high frequency, the regulations were targeted at transactions in excess of $10,000. Casino regulation has been a topic of debate, prompting the United States Senate to have a hearing before the United States Congress in which Title 31 topics were discussed through testimony by industry experts such as Grant Eve, CPA and partner at Joseph Eve, Certified Public Accountants and Ernest Stevens Jr., Chairman of the National Indian Gaming Association.

== Transaction reporting ==
Currency transactions that occur within a single Gaming Day (the normal 24-hour period that any casino uses for accounting and business reporting), whether the currency is paid into the casino, paid out, or exchanged (in the case of foreign currency exchanges), in excess of $10,000 requires the completion of a Currency Transaction Report (CTR, FinCEN Form 112) and must contain enough information to accurately identify the individual(s) transacting the currency.

For example, if a man walks into a casino, stops at the blackjack tables and buys into the game for $12,000 (using cash), a CTR must be completed by the casino and filed with the IRS. In this example, the currency is paid into the casino in the form of cash, which happens within the unique 24-hour Gaming Day of the casino.

Here is an example of a cash-out transaction: the established Gaming Day of a certain casino begins at 1:00 am and ends at 12:59 am. At 6:30 am, a woman takes $6,400 in slot machine tickets to the main cage of the casino and requests payment in all $20 bills. Later that day, at around 7:10 pm, the same woman approaches another cash cage on the opposite side of the casino and exchanges $4,000 in blackjack chips for cash. Because $10,400 was paid out in cash to a single individual on a single Gaming Day, a CTR must be filed by the casino to report the Cash Out transaction, because it is above the $10,000 threshold.

Because multiple transactions are aggregated for the purpose of Title 31 reporting, casinos create tracking programs to identify large transactions and automatically aggregate them in real time to ensure that they are compliant with the regulations.

== Suspicious activity ==
Many criminals, such as those interested in tax evasion and money laundering, have researched the Title 31 requirements and have created a number of strategies to avoid detection of their activities by circumventing the reporting requirements. When these activities are discovered, casino staff are required to file a Suspicious Activity Report (SAR) to report the suspicious activities. Because there are many types of suspicious activities, it is required that casino personnel receive Title 31 training to avoid penalty and remain compliant.

Two of the most popular strategies for circumventing CTR reporting are structuring and minimal gaming.

=== Structuring ===
Because the $10,000 per gaming day CTR threshold is part of the Bank Secrecy Act, a criminal may seek to evade being recorded on a CTR by breaking a transaction over $10,000 into multiple smaller transactions, which is known as structuring. Single and multiple currency transactions in excess of $10,000 (in a single Gaming Day) are reported to the IRS. To track multiple transactions, many casinos record transactions as low as $3,000 (and lower) to ensure that they remain compliant with the CTR requirements. Again, criminals (including those interested in tax evasion) may break up their transactions into several, smaller transactions to avoid detection.

For example, conducting three transactions of $4,000 is more than $10,000, which is the threshold for reporting a CTR. If the casinos did not track multiple transactions, the individual might be able to circumvent the reporting of their transactions. However, because most casinos track transactions of $4,000 (and lower), structuring this $12,000 transaction into three, smaller transactions would not prevent a CTR from being filed. While it may be possible to break up $12,000 into 20 individual transactions of $600 each, casino personnel also maintain awareness of this tactic and would likely detect the numerous trips to the cage to perform similar transactions.

=== Minimal gaming ===
Another type of suspicious activity is related to money laundering, where a casino patron may put large amounts of money in play, but gambles very little before cashing out.

For example, a bank robber steals $50,000 from a large bank. Most banks mark cash with exploding dye or sequential numbering of the large bills. To avoid being apprehended, the bank robber needs to exchange the stolen money for money that cannot be traced back to the robbery. In this situation, a bank robber may put $1,000 in $20 bills into a slot machine and spin twice before cashing out. Whether the slot machine pays the bank robber in coins or a slot ticket is irrelevant because the traceable money is in the machine and the bank robber will effectively receive "clean" or "laundered" money.

Both of these situations are suspicious, as defined by Title 31 regulations, and require a completed SAR by the casino, within a specified period of time.

=== Involvement of Agents ===
Two or more individuals handling the same currency bankroll are commonly referred to as "agents" by the casino. An example would be individuals purchasing chips and dividing them amongst themselves. Agents cashing out chips or making currency transactions on behalf of one another are also popular examples of agent activity. Since agents handle the same bankroll, they essentially become entities and their transactions must be recorded together. All parties involved in agent activity must submit proper identification and complete the required IRS forms when their COMBINED transactions reach over $10,000 in a gaming day. While agent activity can sometimes occur with legitimate transactions (e.g. a husband cashing out his wife's slot vouchers so she can continue to play), agent activity is highly suspicious because it allows individuals to structure their transactions below the $10,000 to avoid being documented to the IRS.

=== Involvement of casino staff ===
It is illegal for an employee of the casino to assist a casino patron in circumventing the reporting requirements of Title 31. Such circumvention can include notifying patrons that they are nearing reporting thresholds, disclosing the time that the Gaming Day ends, and neglecting to report suspicious activity. A casino employee found to have circumvented Title 31 can be assessed civil and criminal fines, in addition to incarceration.
