= Abilene (film) =

- Directed by: Joe Camp III
- Written by: Joe Camp III
- Produced by: Tom Gamble
- Starring: Ernest Borgnine
- Cinematography: Rob Sweeney
- Edited by: Olof Källström
- Music by: Charles Engstrom
- Production companies: Clear Stream Pictures; Farmland Pictures
- Release date: March 13, 1999 (South by Southwest)
- Running time: 104 minutes
- Country: United States
- Language: English

Abilene (also titled Shadows of the Past) is a 1999 American drama film written and directed by Joe Camp III and starring Ernest Borgnine.

== Cast ==
- Ernest Borgnine as Hotis Brown
- Kim Hunter as Emmeline Brown
- James Morrison as Bernie
- Wendell Pierce as Reverend Tillis
- Park Overall as Betty
- Adrian Richard as Mavis
- Alan North as Jarvisn Brown
- Zoaunne LeRoy as Shirley
- Mary Jo Catlett as Etta
- Rance Howard as Arliss
