= The Wedding Coach =

- Genre: Reality show
- Country of origin: United States
- Original language: English
- No. of seasons: 1
- No. of episodes: 6

Production
- Running time: 31–33 min

Original release
- Network: Netflix
- Release: April 7, 2021

The Wedding Coach is a reality television series starring Jamie Lee, Fortune Feimster and Jon Gabrus that that aired on Netflix on April 7, 2021.

== Cast ==
- Jamie Lee
- Fortune Feimster
- Jon Gabrus
