= Maria Cocuzza =

Italian gymnast

Personal information
- Nationality: Italian
- Born: 23 July 1973 (age 51); Catania, Italy

Sport
- Sport: Gymnastics

Maria Cocuzza (born 23 July 1973) is an Italian gymnast. She competed in five events at the 1988 Summer Olympics.

Cocuzza was married to Francesco Virlinzi, who died in 2000, aged 41.

At the 2020 Olympic Games, she served as a judge evaluating competitors in women's floor exercise.
