= Joseph Eve, Certified Public Accountants =

Wipfli/Joseph Eve, Certified Public Accountants
- Headquarters: Billings, Montana
- No. of offices: 4
- No. of employees: 70
- Major practice areas: Tribal accounting, gaming accounting, governmental accounting and related auditing
- Key people: Joseph Eve, Todd Timboe, Tiffany Madden, Grant Eve _{(partners)}
- Revenue: US $11,000,000
- Date founded: 1985
- Founder: Joseph Eve
- Company type: Accounting
- Website: www.josepheve.com

Wipfli/Joseph Eve, Certified Public Accountants is an American public accounting firm with approximately 70 employees practicing in 28 states. The firm is unique in that it focuses on the specialty niche of tribal accounting, which accounts for about 95% of its business, and holds about 60 of the US 290 Indian tribes as clients. On October 1, 2017, Joseph Eve merged with Milwaukee-based Wipfli, one of the top 20 accounting and business consulting firms in the United States.

The firm has taken part in events such as testimony about online gaming before the United States Senate Committee on Indian Affairs. In particular, Daniel Akaka, United States Senator representing Hawaiʻi, has shown interest in topics such as Indian and Internet Gaming, and has held oversight meetings with Joseph Eve's partner Grant Eve as an expert witness in the oversight hearing on the future of internet gaming and what is at stake for tribes in November 2011. The National Indian Gaming Association's whitepapers on internet gaming is prepared primarily by the firm, and the firm has continued to be involved in Indian gaming accounting technology development and tribal accounting issues, such as the Rosebud Sioux Casino case and state online lottery accounting. In August 2012, Joseph Eve partner Grant Eve and Consultant Ehren Richardson was chosen to speak before the National Indian Gaming Association Subcommittee on Internet gaming, in which he stressed that "Internet Gaming is here"; and pointed out facts such as Facebook UK launching iGaming slots and MGM Resorts launching MyVegas on Facebook.

== Gaming ==
Although the firm began with governmental auditing, the firm has been heavily involved in accounting issues surrounding the Indian Gaming Regulatory Act, which sparked demand for auditing services and outlines rules for tribal gaming operations.

In July 2012, Joseph Eve made a presentation at the Great Plains Conference regarding the Department of Justice 2011 notice that clarified state online lotteries were not prohibited.

In 2013, the firm joined with the gaming software company Newave to release NWJE University, an online software product initially designed to train casino employees on Title 31 compliance online.
