= John Audino =

Amnerican athlete and coach (born 1953)

Current position
- Title: Special teams coordinator & running backs coach
- Team: Marist
- Conference: PFL

Biographical details
- Born: June 5, 1953 (age 73); Albany, New York, U.S.

Playing career

Football
- 1973–1974: Notre Dame
- Position: Running back

Coaching career (HC unless noted)

Football
- 1975–1976: Albany (ST)
- 1977–1981: Columbia (assistant)
- 1982: Kentucky (TE)
- 1983–1985: Union (NY) (OC)
- 1986–1989: Penn (WR/QB)
- 1990–1991: Kean
- 1992–2015: Union (NY)
- 2016–2017: Columbia (TE/PCG)
- 2018–2024: La Salle Institute (NY)
- 2025–present: Marist (STC/RB)

Baseball
- 1983–1984: Union (NY)

Head coaching record
- Overall: 160–101 (college football); 14–17–1 (college baseball)
- Tournaments: Football; 2–5 (NCAA D-III playoffs)

Accomplishments and honors

Championships
- As coach: 6 ECAC Northwest; 7 UCAA / Liberty League (1995–1996, 2000, 2005–2006, 2009, 2011); As player: National (1973)

John Audino (born June 5, 1953) is an American football coach and former player. He is the special teams coordinator and running backs coach at Marist, a position he had held since 2025. Audino served as the head football coach at Kean University from 1990 to 1992, at Union College in Schenectady, New York from 1992 to 2015 and at La Salle Institute in North Greenbush, New York from 2018 to 2024. Audino guided the Union Dutchmen to six Eastern College Athletic Conference (ECAC) Northwest Championship titles and four Liberty League titles.

Audino attended the University of Notre Dame and played on the football team as a running back. He received his undergraduate degree in 1975. Audino then pursued a master's degree at the University of Albany. While there, he worked under head coach Bob Ford as the Great Danes' special teams coordinator.

Audino then spent the next 13 years as an assistant coach at four different universities until he landed his first head coaching job at Kean University in Union, New Jersey in 1990. He only stayed for two seasons, compiling an 8–12 record, before accepting the newly-vacant head coaching position at Union.

== Head coaching record ==
=== College football ===
Year	Team	Overall	Conference	Standing	Bowl/playoffs
Kean Cougars (New Jersey Athletic Conference) (1990–1991)
1990	Kean	5–5	3–3	T–4th	
1991	Kean	3–7	1–5	6th	
Kean:		8–12	4–8		
Union Dutchmen (NCAA Division III independent) (1992–1994)
1992	Union	6–3			
1993	Union	9–1			L NCAA Division III First Round
1994	Union	8–2			W ECAC Northwest Championship
Union Dutchmen (Upstate Collegiate Athletic Association / Liberty League) (1995–2015)
1995	Union	9–2	3–1	1st	L NCAA Division III Second Round
1996	Union	9–1	4–0	1st	W ECAC Northwest Championship
1997	Union	7–2	3–1	2nd	
1998	Union	6–3	2–2	3rd	
1999	Union	9–2	3–1	2nd	W ECAC Northwest Championship
2000	Union	9–2	3–1	T–1st	L NCAA Division III First Round
2001	Union	9–2	3–1	2nd	W ECAC Northwest Championship
2002	Union	5–5	3–1	2nd	
2003	Union	5–5	2–2	T–3rd	
2004	Union	6–3	6–1	2nd	
2005	Union	11–1	7–0	1st	L NCAA Division III Second Round
2006	Union	7–3	5–1	1st	L NCAA Division III First Round
2007	Union	5–5	5–2	T–2nd	L ECAC Upstate Championship
2008	Union	5–4	4–3	T–3rd	
2009	Union	8–3	6–1	T–1st	W ECAC Northwest Bowl Championship
2010	Union	2–7	2–4	6th	
2011	Union	6–4	5–1	T–1st	
2012	Union	6–4	6–1	2nd	
2013	Union	3–7	3–4	5th	
2014	Union	2–8	2–5	7th	
2015	Union	0–10	0–7	8th	
Union:		152–89	77–40		
Total:		160–101			
National championship Conference title Conference division title or championship game berth
