= Brian Carlson (American football) =

American football coach

Biographical details
- Born: March 6, 1962 (age 63)

Coaching career (HC unless noted)
- 1992–1999: Kean

Head coaching record
- Overall: 24–48–4

Accomplishments and honors

Championships
- 1 NJAC (1994)

Brian Carlson (born March 6, 1962) is a former head football coach for Kean University in Union, New Jersey. In eight seasons as head football coach (1992–1999), he compiled a record of 24–48–4, including a New Jersey Athletic Conference Co-Championship in 1994.

== Head coaching record ==
Year	Team	Overall	Conference	Standing	Bowl/playoffs
Kean Cougars (New Jersey Athletic Conference) (1992–1999)
1992	Kean	6–3–1	3–3	4th	
1993	Kean	5–4	2–3	T–4th	
1994	Kean	6–3–1	3–1–1	T–1st	
1995	Kean	3–4–2	2–2	3rd	
1996	Kean	2–7	1–4	5th	
1997	Kean	1–9	1–4	5th	
1998	Kean	1–9	1–4	5th	
1999	Kean	0–9	0–5	6th	
Kean:		24–48–4	13–26–1		
Total:		24–48–4			
National championship Conference title Conference division title or championship game berth
