= Murder of Roseann Quinn =

American murdered teacher (1944–1973)

Roseann Quinn
- Born: November 17, 1944; New York, New York, U.S.
- Died: January 2, 1973 (aged 28); New York, New York, U.S.
- Resting place: Saint Mary's Catholic Church Cemetery, Morris County, New Jersey, U.S. 40.88220°N 74.57860°W (approximate)
- Occupation: Primary schoolteacher
- Known for: Murder Victim, Subject of Looking for Mr. Goodbar

Roseann M. Quinn (November 17, 1944 – January 2, 1973) was an American schoolteacher in New York City who was stabbed to death in 1973 by a man she had met at a bar. Her murder inspired Judith Rossner's best-selling 1975 novel Looking for Mr. Goodbar, which was adapted into a 1977 film directed by Richard Brooks and starring Diane Keaton, and the television film, Trackdown: Finding the Goodbar Killer, released in 1983. Quinn's murder also inspired the 1977 account Closing Time: The True Story of the "Goodbar" Murder by New York Times journalist Lacey Fosburgh. The case was the subject of a Season 3 episode 2 of Investigation Discovery's series A Crime to Remember in 2015 ("Last Night Stand").

== Early life and education ==
Quinn was born in 1944 in the Bronx, to Irish Americans John and Roseann Quinn. She had two brothers, John and Dennis, and a sister, Donna. When Quinn was 11 years old, her family moved to Mine Hill Township, near Dover, New Jersey; her father was an executive with Bell Laboratories in Parsippany-Troy Hills, New Jersey. When she was 13, Quinn spent a year in the hospital after a back operation (due to scoliosis), which left her with a slight limp.

Quinn attended Morris Catholic High School in Denville, New Jersey and graduated in 1962. Her yearbook said she was "Easy to meet ... nice to know." Quinn enrolled at Newark State College (now Kean University) where she majored in elementary education and graduated in 1966. She was on the staff of Independent, the college's student-run newspaper.

== Later life ==
After graduating, Quinn moved to New York City and taught for three years in Newark, New Jersey. In September 1969, she began teaching at St. Joseph's School for the Deaf in the Bronx, where she taught a class of eight eight-year-olds. She frequently stayed after school on her own time to help the children, other teachers recalled. "The students loved her," a spokesman for the school later said.

By May 1972, Quinn had moved into a studio apartment at 253 West 72nd Street in Manhattan. The building had been known as the Hotel West Pierre before being converted to apartments four years earlier. According to her acquaintances and neighbors, Quinn would sit by herself and read at bars on the West Side. Police Captain John M. McMahon later said "she was an affable, outgoing, friendly girl. Her friends were rather diverse. She knew teachers and artists and her circle of friends was a very large, interracial group ... She knew an awful lot of people." One friend who later spoke to the media said that Quinn had struck up a conversation with him by revealing that she had been reading his lips and following a conversation at the other end of the bar that she could not have heard.

Quinn had been attending night courses at Hunter College, and by December 1972, had completed about half of the requirements for a master's degree in her specialty of teaching the deaf. Later that month, she attended the faculty Christmas party at St. Joseph's School and a party for the children the next day.

Quinn was known to date and bring men home. Her next-door neighbor had previously heard screams coming from Quinn's apartment. One time, she intervened, and saw a man dashing out of Quinn's apartment yelling obscenities. The neighbor found Quinn disheveled and bruised, with a black eye, sobbing.

== Murder ==
On the evening of New Year's Day 1973, Quinn went across the street from her apartment to a bar named W.M. Tweeds, at 250 West 72nd Street, where she met John Wayne Wilson. Wilson's friend, Geary Guest, had left around 11:00 p.m., before Wilson met Quinn. Wilson and Quinn went to her studio apartment at 253 West 72nd Street on the 7th floor, where they smoked marijuana and attempted to have intercourse. As Wilson later told his attorney, he was unable to achieve an erection. He claimed that Quinn insulted him and demanded that he leave her apartment, and an argument ensued. After a struggle, Wilson picked up a knife and, according to his police statement, stabbed Quinn 18 times in the neck and abdomen.

After the murder, Wilson covered Quinn's body with a bathrobe, showered, and left the apartment. Before leaving, he wiped his fingerprints off the murder weapon, the doorknobs and other surfaces that he had touched. Later that night, Wilson confessed the crime to Guest. Believing that Wilson was fabricating the story in order to get a plane ticket home, Guest gave him enough money to leave town. Wilson first flew to Miami to pick up his wife, Kathy, and they later flew to Indiana.

Quinn's body was not discovered until the morning of January 3. The authorities at St. Joseph's School, alarmed that Quinn had neither called nor shown up for work in two days, sent a teacher to her apartment to check up on her. Amedio Gizzi, the building superintendent, let the teacher into the apartment where they found Quinn's body. A broom stick had been inserted in her vagina and seminal fluid was found, thus calling Wilson's account into question. Quinn's 25-year-old brother John later identified the body at the morgue.

== Funeral ==
Quinn's wake was held at Bermingham Funeral Home at 249 S. Main Street, Wharton, New Jersey. Her funeral was held on January 6, 1973, at St. Mary's Church in Wharton, a mile from her family's home in Mine Hill. The funeral mass was led by Quinn's cousin, the Rev. John Waldron of St. Teresa of Avila Church in Brooklyn. She was buried at St. Mary's Cemetery, a quarter of a mile from the church.

== Investigation and aftermath ==
In the days before DNA evidence, there was little to connect Quinn to her killer. No one at Tweeds knew the identity of the man with whom she had left, nor could they recall his appearance. The crime scene had been effectively sanitized. Desperate to crack a case that had been on the front pages for days, the New York City Police Department (NYPD) released a police sketch that ran in several New York City newspapers on January 7, 1973. The sketch was not of the killer, but was that of Wilson's acquaintance Geary Guest.

Guest was not sure whether Wilson had committed the murder until he saw Quinn's name in a newspaper article. Fearing that he might be charged as an accessory after the fact, Guest first called his friend Fred Ebb and Ebb's personal assistant, Gary Greenwood. Guest told Ebb and Greenwood that he could not tell them what had happened over the phone, but said that it was the worst thing with which anyone could be involved. He said he was going to California to see them and then hung up. Guest arrived at Ebb's home in Bel Air, Los Angeles, the next day and then told Ebb and Greenwood about Wilson and the murder. Guest said that he had been out with Wilson and had left early because he had to go to work in the morning. He said that when he woke up, Wilson had not returned to the apartment, and Guest became worried. Wilson subsequently arrived and confessed the murder to him, and Guest gave him money.

Ebb called Guest's therapist, Hadassah, in New York; she said that she would contact an attorney and would call him back as soon as possible. Shortly thereafter, she and the attorney called back; the attorney advised Ebb to put Guest on the first plane back to New York City. He also advised Ebb and Greenwood not to say a word about what Guest had told them.

In mid-March, Ebb and Greenwood flew to New York City. It took more than two weeks to convince Guest to talk to the police. Guest agonized over the fact that his information could send his friend Wilson to prison for life or to death row. Guest's lawyer contacted the police and secured Guest's immunity in exchange for revealing Wilson's location.

NYPD detectives Patrick Toomey and John Lafferty of the Fourth District Homicide Squad flew to Indiana, where, accompanied by Indianapolis Police Sgt. H. Greg Byrne, they arrested Wilson at his younger brother's apartment in downtown Indianapolis. Wilson was brought back to New York and was incarcerated in the Manhattan Detention Complex, known as the Tombs.

After spending some weeks in the Tombs, Wilson was sent to Bellevue Hospital Center on April 19 to be tested for childhood brain damage, which his attorney planned to claim as part of an insanity defense. Wilson stayed at Bellevue for several weeks, but the tests were never administered, and he was eventually returned to the Tombs. Although he had been diagnosed as suicidal, the cells for the suicide watch were full, so Wilson was placed in a regular cell on the fourth floor.

In May, Wilson got into an argument with a prison guard and threatened to kill himself. The guard taunted him by asking if he wanted sheets to help him commit suicide and later threw bed sheets into his cell. Wilson used those sheets to hang himself on May 5, 1973. An investigation was held into the circumstances of Wilson's death, but no charges were ever filed.

== In popular culture ==
The case has been depicted (or adapted) several times, including:

- Judith Rossner's best-selling novel Looking for Mr. Goodbar (1975), which was adapted as a 1977 film of the same title directed by Richard Brooks and starring Diane Keaton. Tom Berenger portrays Gary, the facsimile of Wilson (albeit whose name is similar to Geary).
- Lacey Fosburgh's true-crime, "interpretive non-fiction" book, Closing Time: The True Story of the "Goodbar" Murder (1977).
- Trackdown: Finding the Goodbar Killer (airdate October 15, 1983), a fact-based CBS-TV movie semi-sequel to the 1977 film, starring George Segal and Shelley Hack; the events mostly followed the storyline of the Looking for Mr. Goodbar film but otherwise claimed no connection with Rossner's novel.
- A Carol Burnett Show sketch, "Is She Alone?" (Season 11, Episode 12, originally broadcast on December 11, 1977), starring Burnett, Rock Hudson, and Tim Conway, has Hudson unsuccessfully trying to pick up an unpredictable Burnett in a bar. Conway enters at the end of the sketch; upon being asked his name by Burnett, he replies, "Goodbar. You can just... yeah, call me Mr. Goodbar." Burnett's response, ending the piece, is: "I've been looking for you."
- The Saturday Night Live Season 3 parody sketch "Looking for Mr. Goodbar Sleepytime Playset" (broadcast on March 11, 1978) features Gilda Radner as a little girl in a commercial for the playset and an announcer who explains that she will not win until she is killed. Radner then makes up her own rules of play and destroys the playset.
- The music video for Madonna's single "Bad Girl" (1993), loosely inspired by the book and film version of the case, features Madonna as a chain-smoking, heavy-drinking executive with a penchant for sexual encounters with random anonymous men, which ultimately leads to her being murdered by a young shady low-life who strangles her to death with her pantyhose.
- The Law and Order: SVU Season 2 episode "Secrets" (original airdate February 2, 2001) is based on the case.
- The case is profiled in Episode 302 ("Last Night Stand") of the Investigation Discovery docudrama television series A Crime to Remember (original airdate November 17, 2015).

== See also ==
- List of solved missing person cases: 1950–1999

== Sources ==
- "You Can't Kill Mr. Goodbar". Newsweek. July 8, 2015.
- Knight, Michael (May 6, 1973). "Suspect in Killing of a Teacher On West Side Hangs Himself". The New York Times.
- Montaldo, Charles (May 30, 2019). "The Murder of Roseann Quinn". ThoughtCo.
- "John Wayne Wilson b. 3 Nov 1949 Shelby County, Indiana d. 5 May 1973 New York, New York". Bassett Family Association.
- "The real-life murder behind "Looking For Mr. Goodbar"". HISTORY.com.
- Bovsun, Mara (January 9, 2011). "'Goodbar' teacher's slay terrified city, shedding new light on swinging singles scene of '70s". nydailynews.com.
- Doyle, Sady (June 2, 2012). "Panic Over Young Women Having Sex Isn't New". Slate Magazine.
- Dengrove, Ida Libby. "John Wayne Wilson - Killed School Teacher for Taking Away Boyfriend". archives.law.virginia.edu.
- Brownmiller, Susan (January 20, 1973). "The Police the Press and Roseann Quinn". Alicia Patterson Foundation. New York City.
- "Wilson". Shelby County Indiana History and Genealogy, Newspaper articles.
- Bernstein, Adam (August 11, 2005). "Judith Rossner, 70; 'Mr. Goodbar' Author". The Washington Post.
- "1973 Press Photo Officers hustle John Wayne Wilson to police car at LaGuardia". eBay.
- Burton, Anthony (January 5, 1973). "She Heard Pleas of the Deaf". New York Daily News.
- Capeci, Jerry; Moran, Sheila (January 6, 1973). "Roseann's Circle Gathers and Grieves". New York Post.
- Cotter, Joseph H. (January 4, 1973). "Woman Teacher, 28, Slain on West Side". New York Post.
- Faso, Frank; Lee, Henry (January 10, 1973). "Drifter Seized in Slaying of Roseann". New York Daily News.
- Faso, Frank; Lee, Henry (January 11, 1973). "Arraign Roseann Killing Suspect, Test His Sanity". New York Daily News.
- Fosburgh, Lacey (1977). Closing Time: The True Story of the 'Goodbar' Murder. ISBN 0-440-01371-2.
- Greenwood, Gary (1973). Personal friend of Geary Guest's and personal assistant of Fred Ebb's.
- Kaufman, Michael T. (January 5, 1973). "Teacher, 28, Is Slain in Her Apartment: Other Violence Recalled". The New York Times.
- Knight, Michael (May 6, 1973). "Suspect in Killing of a Teacher On West Side Hangs Himself". The New York Times.
- McCarthy, Philip; Lee, Henry (January 6, 1973). "Cops Hunt Beau in Roseann's Killing". New York Daily News.
- McCarthy, Philip; Lee, Henry (January 7, 1973). "Cops Sketch a Link to Roseann Slaying". New York Daily News.
- Levin, Jay; Feurey (January 5, 1973). "Hunt Last Date of Slain Teacher". New York Post.
- Levin, Jay (January 6, 1973). "Roseann Sketch Readied". New York Post.
- Pearl, Mike; Norman, James (January 9, 1973). "Cops Nab Suspect In Teacher Slaying". New York Post.
- Randazzo, John; Lee, Henry (January 5, 1973). "Young Teacher Slain in West Side Flat". New York Daily News.
- Rinzler, Carol Eisen (June 8, 1975). "'Looking for Mr. Goodbar' (book review)". The New York Times.
- Rossner, Judith (1977). Looking for Mr. Goodbar. Washington Square Press. ISBN 0-671-01901-5.
- "Teacher Victim Of Sex Slaying: Battered With Statue of Self". New York Daily News. January 5, 1973.
- "Slain Teacher: Door-to-Door Search Begins". New York Daily News. January 8, 1973.
