= James F. Sloan =

American intelligence official

James Sloan
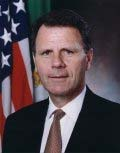

Assistant Commandant of the United States Coast Guard for Intelligence and Criminal Investigations
- In office November 17, 2003 – February 27, 2009
- President: George W. Bush; Barack Obama

Personal details
- Born: February 27, 1947 Springfield, Massachusetts, U.S.
- Died: June 24, 2009 (aged 62) Annapolis, Maryland, U.S.
- Education: Kean University (BA)

Military service
- Branch/service: United States Army
- Years of service: 1966–1969

James F. Sloan (February 27, 1947 – June 24, 2009) was an American intelligence official who served as the Assistant Commandant for Intelligence and Criminal Investigations for the United States Coast Guard and head of Coast Guard Intelligence from November 17, 2003 to February 27, 2009. He was responsible for directing, coordinating, and overseeing intelligence and investigative operations and activities that support all U.S. Coast Guard mission objectives, the national strategy for Homeland Security, and National Security objectives.

== Early life and education ==
A native of Springfield, Massachusetts, Sloan received his Bachelor of Arts in Political Science, magna cum laude, from Kean University. He later became a Senior Executive Fellow at Harvard University's John F. Kennedy School of Government.

Sloan served as a lieutenant in the United States Army from 1966 to 1969. In 2004, he was named Distinguished Graduate of the Army Signal Officer Candidate School.

== Career ==
Sloan began his public service career in Union County, New Jersey in 1970. He served as a Cranford, NJ police officer and then Union County, NJ Prosecutor Office investigator for eight years prior to joining the Secret Service and being assigned to its New York City Field Office, where he specialized in financial crime investigations. He held several investigative, protective, intelligence, and managerial positions, including as Special Agent in Charge of the Boston Field Office and the Service's Office of Investigations, Assistant Special Agent in Charge of the Baltimore Field Office and the Office of Administration, and Assistant to the Special Agent in Charge of the Presidential Protective Division.

He served with the United States Secret Service for 21 years, later serving as the agency's Deputy Assistant Director for Protective Operations. He was responsible for the management of the Service's protective mission, which includes the protection of the President and Cabinet of the United States, as well as the protection of major events of national interest. He was also the Senior Program Manager of the Secret Service's Anti-Terrorism programs and represented the Secret Service as a member of the National Security Council's Counter-Terrorism Security Group.

During 2001, Sloan served as Acting Under Secretary (Enforcement), Department of the Treasury, overseeing the operations of Treasury's law enforcement bureaus, including United States Customs Service; United States Secret Service, Office of Foreign Assets Control, Bureau of Alcohol, Tobacco, Firearms and Explosives, and the Financial Crimes Enforcement Network.

Before assuming the role of head of Coast Guard Intelligence, Sloan was the Director of the Financial Crimes Enforcement Network from April 12, 1999 to 2003. The United States Department of the Treasury designated FinCEN as one of the primary agencies to establish, oversee, and implement policies to prevent and detect money laundering and the financing of terrorism. James Sloan was responsible for working with the law enforcement and intelligence communities, foreign governments, and the financial and regulatory sectors to ensure effective coordination of the efforts to combat terror financing and of U.S. anti-money laundering initiatives.

=== Memberships ===
He was a member of the International Association of Chiefs of Police and the International Association of Financial Crime Investigators. He also served on the board of directors of the Security Affairs Support Association.

=== Recognition ===
Sloan received numerous achievement and performance awards throughout his law enforcement career, including, in September 2001, the Meritorious Executive Presidential Rank Award for his exceptional performance, dedication and commitment to the law enforcement community; and, in November 2003, the Treasury Medal in recognition of his leadership and service to the Department in support of the national effort to combat the financing of terrorism. Upon his retirement as the Assistant Commandant for Intelligence and Criminal Investigations on March 19, 2009, Sloan was awarded the Coast Guard Commandant's Distinguished Career Service Award, the National Intelligence Distinguished Service Medal, the Military Intelligence Corps' Knowlton Award, the Navy Distinguished Public Service Award, the NGA Medallion for Excellence, the Edwin T. Layton Award, the USSS Director's Award, and the NSA Medallion for Excellence. FinCEN has honoredSloan with the creation of the James F. Sloan Award for Partnering. In addition, the United States Coast Guard Intelligence Specialist A School named their award for top academic performance in his honor.

== Personal life ==
Sloan died in Annapolis, Maryland on June 24, 2009, after succumbing to the effects of Lou Gehrig's Disease at the age of 62. He was buried at Lakemont Memorial Gardens.
