= Looking for Mr. Goodbar (film) =

1977 film by Richard Brooks

- Theatrical release poster
- Directed by: Richard Brooks
- Screenplay by: Richard Brooks
- Based on: Looking for Mr. Goodbar (1975 novel) by Judith Rossner
- Produced by: Freddie Fields
- Starring: Diane Keaton; Tuesday Weld; William Atherton; Richard Kiley; Richard Gere
- Cinematography: William A. Fraker
- Edited by: George Grenville
- Music by: Artie Kane
- Distributed by: Paramount Pictures
- Release date: October 19, 1977
- Running time: 136 minutes
- Country: United States
- Language: English
- Box office: $22.5 million

Looking for Mr. Goodbar is a 1977 American crime drama film written and directed by Richard Brooks and starring Diane Keaton, Tuesday Weld, William Atherton, Richard Kiley, Richard Gere, and Tom Berenger (in his film debut). Based on the 1975 novel by Judith Rossner, inspired by the 1973 murder of the schoolteacher Roseann Quinn.

The film was released by Paramount Pictures on October 19, 1977. It was a commercial success, earning $22.5 million (equivalent to $119.54 million in 2025) and received generally favorable reviews, with much of the praise directed towards Keaton's performance. It garnered two Academy Award nominations, Best Supporting Actress (Weld) and Best Cinematography, while Keaton earned a Golden Globe nomination for Best Actress in a Motion Picture – Drama.

Due to rights issues surrounding the film's soundtrack, Looking for Mr. Goodbar was unavailable on home media for nearly 20 years. A remastered Ultra HD Blu-ray and standard Blu-ray were released by Vinegar Syndrome in November 2024.

== Plot ==
Theresa Dunn, a young schoolteacher in an unnamed American city, experiences her sexual awakening while searching for excitement outside her ordered life. While in college, she lives with her repressive Polish-Irish Catholic parents and suffers from severe body image problems following a childhood surgery for scoliosis that left a large scar on her back. She finds out that her scoliosis is congenital and that her aunt Maureen had the same condition and committed suicide. As a result, Theresa is reluctant to have children.

Meanwhile, her beautiful older sister, Katherine, has left her husband and embarked on a wild lifestyle involving multiple affairs, a secret abortion, recreational drug use, and a short-lived marriage to Barney, a Jewish man. Theresa finds first love and loses her virginity to her much older, and married, college professor, Martin Engle. He ends their affair just before her graduation, leaving Theresa feeling used and lonely.

She takes a job teaching deaf children and proves to be a gifted and caring teacher. With Katherine's encouragement, she moves into an apartment in Katherine's building. She frequents a bar at night where she meets Tony Lopanto, a charming but vain Italian-American. She takes Tony to her apartment, taking cocaine with him and sleeping with him. Tony leaves in a hurry and gives her a Quaalude pill to counteract the cocaine. This causes her to oversleep, and she arrives very late for work the next day, angering her employer and students. Tony then disappears for a long while.

Through her job, Theresa meets and dates an Irish-American welfare caseworker, James Morrissey. Her parents approve, seeing him as a potential husband for Theresa. However, the couple do not have sex because James wants a traditional courtship and a monogamous relationship. Theresa sees this as stifling her freedom. Although James initially seems nice, he becomes controlling and disrespectful.

Meanwhile, Theresa begins to go out to marginal places and has sex with strangers, often older men. Tony returns and acts as if nothing had happened. He barges in on Theresa while she is with another man and chases him away. Tony becomes controlling and abusive, and Theresa discovers that he is a street hustler. She breaks up with him, but he stalks and harasses her. After imagining what could happen if Tony were to turn her in to the police as revenge, Theresa gathers up all of the drugs in her apartment and flushes them down the toilet.

With the New Year approaching, she resolves to turn over a new leaf and take control of her life. On New Year's Eve, she meets Gary Cooper White in a bar and cajoles him into helping her avoid James. Gary has been living with his gay lover George Price but lies to Theresa, telling her that he has a pregnant wife in Florida. When they are in bed together at her apartment, Gary is unable to achieve an erection. Theresa tells him that it is okay if they do not have sex, but Gary misinterprets this as questioning his sexuality. In a rage, he attacks her, rapes her, and stabs her to death.

== Cast ==
- Diane Keaton as Theresa Dunn
  - Elizabeth Cheshire as young Theresa
- Tuesday Weld as Katherine Dunn
- William Atherton as James Morrissey
- Richard Kiley as Mr. Dunn
- Richard Gere as Tony Lopanto
- Alan Feinstein as Professor Martin Engle
- Tom Berenger as Gary Cooper White
- Priscilla Pointer as Mrs. Dunn
- Laurie Prange as Brigid Dunn
- Alexander Courtney as Arthur
- Joel Fabiani as Barney
- Julius Harris as "Black Cat"
- Richard Bright as George Prince
- LeVar Burton as "Cap" Jackson
- Brian Dennehy as Surgeon
- Richard Venture as Doctor
- LeVar Burton as Cap Jackson

=== Casting notes ===
Looking for Mr. Goodbar introduced LeVar Burton and Tom Berenger, as men whom the protagonist Theresa Dunn encounters. The film is also the first major screen credit for both Richard Gere and Brian Dennehy.

== Soundtrack ==
Looking For Mr. Goodbar

Soundtrack album by Various
- Released: 1977
- Genres: Disco, Rock, R&B
- Length: 41:05
- Label: Columbia JS 35029
- Producer: Various

Looking For Mr. Goodbar is the 1977 soundtrack album of the film of the same title. The album includes numerous disco, R&B and rock tracks from the era reflective of the music being played in clubs and discos in that period, as well as the film's theme, "Don't Ask To Stay Until Tomorrow" (written by Carol Connors and Artie Kane), presented in both vocal and instrumental versions.

Side one
No.	Title	Artist	Length
1.	"Theme from Looking for Mr. Goodbar (Don't Ask to Stay Until Tomorrow)"	Artie Kane	1:16
2.	"Don't Leave Me This Way"	Thelma Houston	3:37
3.	"Lowdown"	Boz Scaggs	3:19
4.	"Machine Gun"	The Commodores	2:45
5.	"Love Hangover"	Diana Ross	3:47
6.	"She Wants to (Get on Down)"	Bill Withers	3:15
7.	"Theme from Looking for Mr. Goodbar (reprise) (Don't Ask to Stay Until Tomorrow)"	Artie Kane	0:22

Side Two
No.	Title	Artist	Length
1.	"Theme from Looking for Mr. Goodbar (Don't Ask to Stay Until Tomorrow)"	Artie Kane, vocal by Marlena Shaw	4:08
2.	"She's Lonely"	Bill Withers	5:04
3.	"Try Me, I Know We Can Make It"	Donna Summer	4:14
4.	"Back Stabbers"	The O'Jays	3:06
5.	"Prelude To Love / Could It Be Magic"	Donna Summer	6:12

== Production ==
For the sex scenes, Richard Brooks closed the set to all but essential crew. Diane Keaton still had difficulty the first time she was required to appear naked. When she heard Brooks playing a Johann Sebastian Bach record during lunch, she asked if he could play the record during her scene. "Diane is so shy," he said later. "She could only do a nude scene if she was playing to the music. She couldn't play to a man. I think Bach would have been pleased."

== Release ==
Looking For Mr. Goodbar grossed $1.5 million from 110 theaters in its opening weekend. Variety listed the film at number one at the US box office for the week based on their sample of 20-22 cities; however, Star Wars grossed more for the weekend. After 16 days, the film expanded into 169 theatres and after 26 days of release it had grossed $8,128,345 and had spent another two weeks atop the US box office.

=== Home media ===
Looking for Mr. Goodbar was released on LaserDisc and VHS, with the most recent VHS release being in 1997. During a showing of the film on Turner Classic Movies, it was stated by Ben Mankiewicz that its subsequent unavailability on DVD or Blu-ray was owed to licensing complications surrounding the film's extensive use of popular music. Independent label Vinegar Syndrome, under license from Paramount, released the film on Ultra HD Blu-ray and standard Blu-ray on November 29, 2024, marking its debut on both formats.

== Reception and legacy ==
On Rotten Tomatoes, the film has a 67% rating based on 30 reviews, with an average rating of 6.5/10. The site's consensus states: "Diane Keaton gives an absolutely fearless performance in a sexual thriller whose ending will leave audiences trembling." On Metacritic the film has a score of 64 out of 100, based on 9 critics, indicating "generally favorable" reviews.

Many critics praised Diane Keaton's performance. Roger Ebert gave the film 3-out-of-4 stars, praising Keaton's performance but lamenting the "many loose ends and dead ends," some of which he blamed on significant alterations to the novel's plot. Gene Siskel also awarded 3-out-of-4 stars, writing that "Keaton is absolutely compelling in Looking for Mr. Goodbar, even when the film is not." Charles Champlin of the Los Angeles Times called Keaton's performance "high among the year's finest" in a demanding role, and declared the film "powerful, sincere and overlong, and if the film raises questions about itself it is also thought-provoking." Variety stated: "Writer-director Brooks manifests his ability to catch accurately both the tone and subtlety of characters in the most repellant environments – in this case the desperate search for personal identity in the dreary and self-defeating world of compulsive sex and dope. Keaton's performance as the good/bad girl is excellent." Newsweek was also enthusiastic: "Looking for Mr. Goodbar could have been just another sensationalist movie version of a shocking best seller. But Richard Brooks has filmed it with power, seriousness and integrity." A retrospective review from AllMovie stated: "With the casting of Diane Keaton as Theresa, Looking for Mr. Goodbar became a then-rarity in Hollywood movies, depicting an everyday woman with an erotic life, rather than a vamp or a whore," rating the film 31/2-stars-out-of-5.

Some critics found the film lurid and muddled; a review by Frank Rich for Time criticized Brooks for making "many crude miscalculations" in adapting the novel. Vincent Canby of The New York Times stated that Keaton was "virtually the only reason" to see the film, calling her "too good to waste on the sort of material the movie provides, which is artificial without in anyway qualifying as a miracle fabric." John Simon noted that while the novel is set in New York City, the film is said to be located in San Francisco (though identifiably filmed in Chicago's Rush Street neighborhood). He also noted that "the main character is made considerably prettier, thus reducing the principal sources of her insecurity", as compared to her portrayal in the novel as something of a "Plain Jane". Pauline Kael noted, "Richard Brooks [...] has laid a windy jeremiad about our permissive society on top of fractured film syntax. He's lost the erotic, pulpy morbidity that made the novel a compulsive read; the film is splintered, moralistic, tedious." Leonard Maltin rated the film 11/2-stars-out-of-4, writing that the film "begins as an intelligent study of repressed young girl, then wallows endlessly in her new 'liberated' lifestyle", despite praising Keaton's performance.

Rossner praised Keaton's performance. However, she had nothing to do with the making of the film and "detested" the final product. Psychiatry professor Robert O. Friedel suggested in 2006 that Theresa Dunn's behavior in the film is consistent with a diagnosis of borderline personality disorder.

Barry Diller, who at the time served as head of Paramount Pictures, has described Looking for Mr. Goodbar as the turning point for the success of Paramount feature films during his reign.

The film inspired the music video for the 1993 Madonna song "Bad Girl". In the video, Madonna plays a woman who, like Theresa, engages in self-destructive behavior by drinking heavily and sleeping around with random men before she is ultimately murdered by a man she had selected for a one-night stand.

=== Awards and nominations ===
Award	Category	Nominee(s)	Result	Ref.
Academy Awards	Best Supporting Actress	Tuesday Weld	Nominated	
Academy Awards	Best Cinematography	William A. Fraker	Nominated	
Golden Globe Awards	Best Actress in a Motion Picture – Drama	Diane Keaton	Nominated	
New York Film Critics Circle Awards	Best Actress	Diane Keaton	3rd Place	
Writers Guild of America Awards	Best Drama Adapted from Another Medium	Richard Brooks	Nominated	

- While Keaton was not nominated for an Academy Award for this film, she won Best Actress the same year for Annie Hall.

== See also ==
- Closing Time: The True Story of the Goodbar Murder
- Mr. Goodbar
- Trackdown: Finding the Goodbar Killer, a made-for-TV semi-sequel that more or less follows the events of this film.
- List of films featuring the deaf and hard of hearing
- New Hollywood
