= Charlie Cocuzza =

American football player and coach

Playing career
- 1961–1963: Upsala
- 1964: Westchester Crusaders
- 1965: Jersey City Jets
- Position: Quarterback

Coaching career (HC unless noted)
- 1966–1967: Memorial HS (NJ) (assistant)
- 1968: Cresskill HS (NJ) (assistant)
- 1970: Upsala (DB/WR)
- 1973–1975: Cresskill HS (NJ)
- 1976–2002: Montclair State (OC)
- 2003–2005: Kean

Head coaching record
- Overall: 7–23 (college)

Charles Cocuzza is an American former football player and coach. He served as the head football coach at Kean University in Union, New Jersey from 2003 to 2005, compiling a record of 7–23. Prior to taking over the Kean program, Cocuzza served as an assistant coach at Montclair State University for 27 years, most of which were as the Red Hawks' offensive coordinator.

Cocuzza played college football at Upsala College in East Orange, New Jersey, from which he earned a Bachelor of Arts degree. He later received a Master of Arts degree in administration supervision from Seton Hall University. After graduating from Upsala, Cocuzza played professionally in the Atlantic Coast Football League (ACFL) with the Westchester Crusaders and the Jersey City Jets.

Cocuzza first coached as an assistant at Memorial High School in West New York, New Jersey and then at Cresskill High School in Cresskill, New Jersey. He returned to Upsala as an assistant coach in 1970, mentoring the defensive backs and wide receivers. He was appointed head football coach at Cresskill High School in 1973.

== Head coaching record ==
=== College ===
Year	Team	Overall	Conference	Standing	Bowl/playoffs
Kean Cougars (New Jersey Athletic Conference) (2003–2005)
2003	Kean	1–9	1–4	5th	
2004	Kean	2–8	1–5	T–6th	
2005	Kean	4–6	2–4	5th	
Kean:		7–23	4–13		
Total:		7–23			
