= Looking for Mr. Goodbar (novel) =

1975 novel by Judith Rossner

- First edition
- Author: Judith Rossner
- Language: English
- Publisher: Simon & Schuster
- Publication date: 1975
- Publication place: United States
- Media type: Print (Cloth; Paper)
- Pages: 284 (Cloth)

Looking for Mr. Goodbar is a novel by American writer Judith Rossner. Published in 1975, the book—a "stunning psychological study of a woman's passive complicity in her own death"—won critical acclaim and was a #1 New York Times best seller.

== Plot summary ==
Theresa "Terry" Dunn, a young woman living in New York City, leads a double life: by day she is a devoted schoolteacher, but by night she cruises singles bars. Eventually, just as she is trying to make a new start, Terry is murdered by a young drifter who she has just met and invited home.

Prior to these events, which the book details, Theresa is a child suffering from ugly-duckling syndrome, followed by an ordeal as an adult in college in which she is enticed into entering a committed relationship with a married man who turns out to be using her as a companion. The relationship ends, and Theresa then seeks out a series of sexual encounters that are both fleeting and pathological.

== Background ==
By 1973, having published three novels, (Note: Rossner's previous novels were To the Precipice (Morrow, 1966), Nine Months in the Life of an Old Maid (Dial, 1969), and Any Minute I Can Split (McGraw-Hill, 1972).) Judith Rossner was a writer of "impeccable literary credentials." Invited by Nora Ephron to contribute to a special women's issue of Esquire magazine, Rossner wrote an article about a real-life murder that had sparked her interest, that of schoolteacher Roseann Quinn, who had been brutally slain in January 1973 by a man that she had purportedly picked up in a singles bar. In the end, Esquire, fearing legal ramifications, decided not to publish the article, so Rossner decided to write a novel instead.

== Reception ==
Looking for Mr. Goodbar was published by Simon & Schuster on June 2, 1975, to positive reviews. Carol Eisen Rinzler, in The New York Times, said the book was "a complex and chilling portrait of a woman's descent into hell... full of insight and intelligence and illumination." Time magazine wrote, "it is a rare kind of book: both a compelling 'page turner' and a superior roman à clef." Newsweek found the book to be a "hard, fast, frightening read."

Looking for Mr. Goodbar was also a commercial blockbuster: on June 22, 1975, it entered The New York Times Best Seller List, and would remain there for 36 weeks, three of those weeks at #1. It sold over four million copies, becoming the fourth highest-selling novel of the year.

== Adaptations ==
Paramount Pictures purchased film rights to the novel for $250,000. The film, written and directed by Richard Brooks, was released in 1977, and starred Diane Keaton, Tuesday Weld, William Atherton, Richard Gere, and Tom Berenger. The film received mixed reviews, but was a success at the box office, earning $22.5 million (the equivalent of $86.9 million in 2016). It garnered two Academy Award nominations: Best Supporting Actress (Tuesday Weld) and Best Cinematography (by William A. Fraker); neither won. Rossner herself "detested" the film adaptation of her novel but praised Keaton's performance. A semi-sequel, Trackdown: Finding the Goodbar Killer, was produced six years later but otherwise disassociates itself from the original novel, as mentioned in an opening disclaimer.

In 2012, the novel was adapted as Goodbar, a "staged concept album" by the band Bambi and the performing arts group Waterwell. It was presented at The Public Theater in New York as part of the Under the Radar Festival.
