= Tom Berenger =

American actor (born 1949)

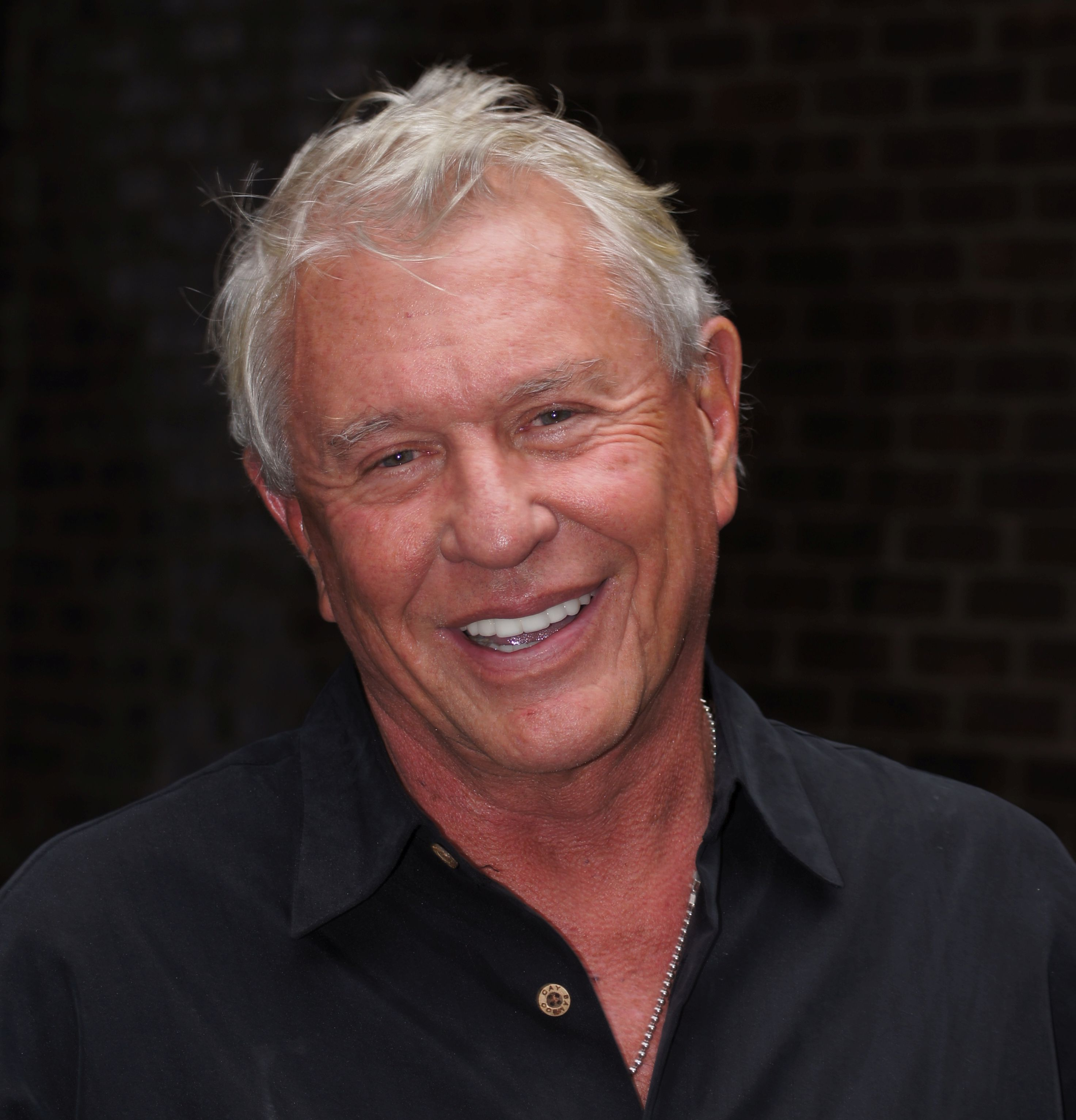
- Berenger in 2019
- Born: Thomas Michael Moore; May 31, 1949 (age 77); Chicago, Illinois, U.S.
- Education: University of Missouri (BA)
- Occupations: Actor; producer; television writer
- Years active: 1968–present
- Spouses: Barbara Wilson (m. 1976; div. 1984); Lisa Williams (m. 1986; div. 1997); Patricia Alvaran (m. 1998; div. 2011); Laura Moretti (m. 2012)
- Children: 6

Thomas Michael Moore (born May 31, 1949), known professionally as Tom Berenger, is an American actor. He was nominated for the Academy Award for Best Supporting Actor and won a Golden Globe Award for his portrayal of the Staff Sergeant Bob Barnes in Platoon (1986). He is also known for playing Jake Taylor in the Major League films and Thomas Beckett in the Sniper films.

Other films he appeared in include Looking for Mr. Goodbar (1977), The Dogs of War (1980), The Big Chill (1983), Eddie and the Cruisers (1983), Someone to Watch Over Me (1987), Betrayed (1988), The Field (1990), Gettysburg (1993), The Substitute (1996), Training Day (2001), and Inception (2010). He won the Primetime Emmy Award for Outstanding Supporting Actor in a Miniseries or a Movie for his performance as Jim Vance in the 2012 miniseries Hatfields & McCoys.

== Early life and education ==
Berenger was born Thomas Michael Moore in Chicago, on May 31, 1949, to a Catholic family of Irish ancestry with his great-grandfather and grandmother settling in Chicago. He has a sister, Susan. His father was a printer for the Chicago Sun-Times and a traveling salesman.

Moore graduated in 1967 from Rich East High School in Park Forest, Illinois. He studied journalism at the University of Missouri in Columbia, Missouri, but decided to seek an acting career following his graduation in 1971 with a Bachelor of Arts degree. Moore selected "Berenger" as his professional name after he was forced to change his surname professionally, as there was already a "Tom Moore" in the Actors' Equity Association.

== Career ==
Berenger worked in regional theatre and in 1972, he worked as a flight attendant with Eastern Airlines, based in San Juan, Puerto Rico. He transferred to New York in 1973. He worked in soap operas and had a starring role as lawyer Tim Siegel on One Life to Live.

His feature film debut was the lead in Rush It, an independent film that was shot in 1976 but unreleased until 1978. In 1977, he had a supporting role as the killer of the lead character (played by Diane Keaton) in Looking for Mr. Goodbar, based on the murder of schoolteacher Roseann Quinn. In 1978, he had a starring role in the Canadian film In Praise of Older Women. In 1979, he played Butch Cassidy in Butch and Sundance: The Early Days, a role he got in part because of his resemblance to Paul Newman, who played the character in Butch Cassidy and the Sundance Kid (1969).

Berenger starred in several significant films in the 1980s, including The Big Chill (1983), Eddie and the Cruisers (1983), Rustlers' Rhapsody (1985), Platoon (1986), Someone to Watch Over Me (1987), Shoot to Kill (1988), and Major League (1989). In 1986, he received an Academy Award nomination for his portrayal of the Staff Sergeant Barnes in Platoon (this performance won him a Golden Globe Award for "Best Supporting Actor"). A role for which he has become well known for is Thomas Beckett, the main character in the mid-1990s film Sniper (which would later be followed by six sequels, featuring Berenger in the starring role for four). Other notable films from that period in which he was featured include Born on the Fourth of July (1989), Shattered (1991), Sliver (1993), and Chasers (1994). When asked in a 1999 interview to name his favorite film out of those in which he had acted, Berenger said it was too difficult to choose but that the one he had watched most frequently was his 1993 film Gettysburg, where he played the role of Confederate General James Longstreet.

He established the Tom Berenger Acting Scholarship Fund in 1988 to award theatre students for excellence in performance.

In more recent years, Berenger has continued to have an active acting career in film and television, although often at a supporting level. One of his most notable television appearances was on Cheers in its last season as Rebecca Howe's blue collar-plumber love interest, for which he was nominated for an Emmy Award for "Outstanding Guest Actor in a Comedy Series". He also began a career as a producer in the 1990s. Berenger co-produced the 1997 miniseries Rough Riders, also starring as Theodore Roosevelt.

Berenger was also seen on the box art and promotional content for Novalogic's Delta Force: Black Hawk Down, as his roles in Sniper 2 and Sniper 3 were very similar to what was chosen for the game's artwork. He starred in the mini-series version of Stephen King's Nightmares & Dreamscapes, as a celebrated author who realizes the warped painting he recently purchased is alive with illustrations of impending doom for him in "The Road Virus Heads North". Berenger stars opposite Armand Assante and Busta Rhymes in the dramatic thriller Breaking Point, which had a limited release starting in December 2009.

Berenger appeared in the 2010 science fiction thriller Inception with Leonardo DiCaprio and Cillian Murphy, where he played a business executive who served as a mentor to and was an associate of the father of Murphy's character. It was his first major film role since Training Day in 2001. In 2012, he appeared in the television miniseries Hatfields & McCoys as Jim Vance, uncle of protagonist Devil Anse Hatfield (Kevin Costner). On September 23, 2012, Berenger won a Primetime Emmy Award for Outstanding Supporting Actor in a Miniseries or a Movie for the role.

In 2022, it was announced that Berenger would star in the comedy film Plan B, alongside Jon Heder and Shannon Elizabeth.

== Personal life ==
Berenger has been married four times and has six children. He married Laura Moretti in Sedona, Arizona, in early September 2012.

== Filmography ==
=== Film ===
Year	Title	Role	Notes
1977	The Sentinel	Potential Male Tenant	Uncredited
1977	Looking for Mr. Goodbar	Gary	
1978	Rush It	Richard Moore	
1978	In Praise of Older Women	Andras Vayda	
1979	Butch and Sundance: The Early Days	Butch Cassidy	
1980	The Dogs of War	Drew Blakeley	
1982	Beyond the Door	Matthew Jackson	
1983	The Big Chill	Sam Weber	
1983	Eddie and the Cruisers	Frank Ridgeway	
1984	Fear City	Matt Rossi	
1985	Rustlers' Rhapsody	Rex O'Herlihan	
1986	Platoon	Staff Sergeant Bob Barnes	
1987	Someone to Watch Over Me	Detective Mike Keegan	
1988	Shoot to Kill	Jonathan Knox	
1988	Betrayed	Gary Simmons	
1988	Last Rites	Michael	
1989	Major League	Jake Taylor	
1989	Born on the Fourth of July	Gunnery Sergeant Hayes	
1990	Love at Large	Harry Dobbs	
1990	The Field	The American	
1991	Shattered	Dan Merrick	
1991	At Play in the Fields of the Lord	Lewis Moon	
1993	Sniper	MGySgt. Thomas J. "Tom" Beckett	
1993	Sliver	Jack Landsford	
1993	Gettysburg	Lieutenant General James Longstreet	
1994	Major League II	Jake Taylor	
1994	Chasers	Rock Reilly	
1995	Last of the Dogmen	Lewis Gates	
1996	The Substitute	Jonathan Shale	
1996	An Occasional Hell	Dr. Ernest Dewalt	
1998	The Gingerbread Man	Pete Randle	
1998	Shadow of Doubt	Jack Campioni	
1999	A Murder of Crows	Detective Clifford Dubose	
1999	One Man's Hero	John Riley	
1999	Diplomatic Siege	General Buck Swain	
1999	Turbulence 2: Fear of Flying	Sikes	
2000	Takedown	McCoy Rollins	
2001	Training Day	District Attorney Stanley 'Stan' Gursky	
2001	The Hollywood Sign	Tom Greener	
2001	True Blue	Rembrandt 'Remy' Macy	
2001	Watchtower	Art Stoner	
2002	D-Tox	Hank	
2004	Sniper 3	MGySgt. Thomas J. "Tom" Beckett	
2005	Detective	Sgt. Malcolm Ainslie	
2007	The Christmas Miracle of Jonathan Toomey	Jonathan Toomey	
2008	Stiletto	Virgil Vadalos	
2009	Silent Venom	Admiral Bradley Wallace	
2009	Charlie Valentine	Becker	
2009	Breaking Point	Steven Luisi	
2010	Smokin' Aces 2: Assassins' Ball	Hal Leuco / FBI Agent Walter Weed	
2010	Sinners and Saints	Captain Trahan	
2010	Inception	Peter Browning	
2010	Faster	Warden	
2011	Last Will	Frank Emery	
2011	Bucksville	The Patron of Justice	
2012	Brake	Agent Ben Reynolds	
2012	War Flowers	General McIntire	
2014	Bad Country	Lutin	
2014	Doc Holliday's Revenge	Judge Wells	
2014	Lonesome Dove Church	John Shepherd	
2014	Sniper: Legacy	MGySgt. Thomas J. "Tom" Beckett	
2014	Reach Me	Teddy	
2015	Impact Earth	Herbert Sloan	
2017	Sniper: Ultimate Kill	MGySgt. Thomas J. "Tom" Beckett	
2017	Cops and Robbers	Captain Randolph	
2018	American Dresser	John Moore	
2018	Battle of the Bulge: Wunderland	Major McCulley	
2018	Gone Are the Days	Will	
2018	1st Born	Jefferson Tucker	
2019	Stakeout	Joe Smith	
2019	Supervized	Ray	
2020	Blood and Money	Jim Reed	
2020	Adam	Jerry Niskar	
2020	Sniper: Assassin's End	MGySgt. Thomas J. "Tom" Beckett	
2020	Battle of the Bulge: Winter War	Major McCulley	
2022	The Most Dangerous Game	Benjamin Colt	
2022	Black Warrant	Nick Falconi	
2022	As Good as Dead	Sonny Kilbane	
2022	A Tale of Two Guns	McTeague	
2023	Among Wolves	Father Callahan	
2024	One More Shot	Mike Marshall	
2024	Plan B	Joe Cassidy	
2026	Vampires of the Velvet Lounge	Albert	
2026	Sniper: No Nation	MGySgt. Thomas J. "Tom" Beckett	
TBA	Minute Mark †		Post-production

=== Television ===
Year	Title	Role	Notes
1975–76	One Life to Live	Tim Siegel	66 episodes
1977	Johnny, We Hardly Knew Ye	Billy Sutton	Television film
1979	Flesh & Blood	Bobby Fallon	Television film
1986	If Tomorrow Comes	Jeff Stevens	Miniseries
1991	Dream On	Nick Spencer	1 episode
1993	Cheers	Don Santry	2 episodes
1995	Body Language	Gavin St. Claire	Television film
1995	The Avenging Angel	Miles Utley	Television film
1997	Rough Riders	Theodore Roosevelt	Miniseries
1999	In the Company of Spies	Kevin Jefferson	Television film
2000	Law & Order	Dean Tyler	Episode: "Panic"
2000	Cutaway	Red Line	Television film
2001	Jackson County War	Cain Hammett	Television film
2002	Ally McBeal	Harrison Wyatt	Episode: "Nine One Nine"
2002	The Junction Boys	Paul 'Bear' Bryant	Television film
2002	Sniper 2	MGySgt. Thomas J. "Tom" Beckett	Television film
2003	Third Watch	Aaron Noble	4 episodes
2003	Peacemakers	Marshal Jared Stone	9 episodes
2004	Capital City	Senator Foxworthy	Television film
2005	Into the West	Colonel J. Chivington	Episode: "Hell on Wheels"
2005	Detective	Sergeant Malcolm Ainslie	Television film
2006	Nightmares & Dreamscapes: From the Stories of Stephen King	Richard Kinnell	Episode: "The Road Virus Heads North"
2007	America's Iliad: The Siege of Charleston	Narrator (voice)	Television film
2007–08	October Road	Bob 'The Commander' Garrett	19 episodes
2008	Amber Alert: Terror on the Highway	Larsan	Television film
2011	XIII: The Series	Rainer Gerhardt	6 episodes
2012	Hatfields & McCoys	Jim Vance	Miniseries
2013–15	Major Crimes	Jackson Raydor	7 episodes
2014	Hawaii Five-0	Eddie Williams	Episode: "Ma lalo o ka 'ili"
2017	Training Day	District Attorney Stanley 'Stan' Gursky	Episode: "Elegy" (reprised character from 2001 film of the same name)
2026	High Value Target: The Hunt for Saddam	Charles Nixon Sr.	3 episodes

== Awards and nominations ==
Institution	Year	Category	Work	Result	Ref.
Academy Awards	1987	Best Supporting Actor	Platoon	Nominated	
Central Ohio Film Critics Association	2011	Best Ensemble	Inception	Nominated	
Golden Boot Awards	2000	—N/a	—N/a	Won	
Golden Globe Awards	1987	Best Supporting Actor – Motion Picture	Platoon	Won	
Golden Raspberry Awards	1994	Worst Supporting Actor	Sliver	Nominated	
Phoenix Film Critics Society	2010	Best Ensemble Acting	Inception	Nominated	
Primetime Emmy Awards	1993	Outstanding Guest Actor in a Comedy Series	Cheers ("One for the Road")	Nominated	
Primetime Emmy Awards	2012	Outstanding Supporting Actor in a Limited Series or Movie	Hatfields & McCoys	Won	
Washington D.C. Area Film Critics Association	2010	Best Ensemble	Inception	Nominated	
Western Heritage Awards	2004	Fictional Television Drama	Peacemakers	Won	
Western Heritage Awards	2013	Western Documentary	Hatfields & McCoys	Won	
