= Family Happiness =

1859 novella by Leo Tolstoy

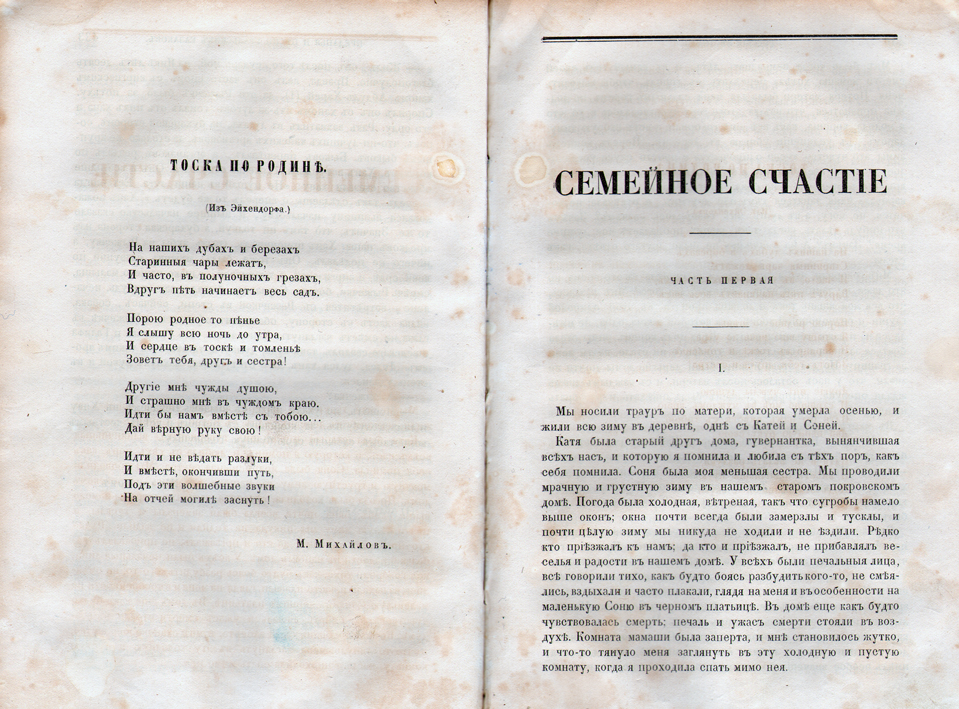
- The Russian Messenger, № 7–8 April 1859
- Author: Leo Tolstoy
- Original title: Семейное счастіе
- Translator: April Fitz Lyon (1953)
- Language: Russian
- Genre: Fiction
- Publication date: 1859
- Publication place: Russia
- Pages: 214 p. (Hardcover)

Family Happiness (pre-reform Russian: Семейное счастіе; post-reform Russian: Семейное счастие, romanized: Seméynoye schástiye) is an 1859 novella written by Leo Tolstoy, first published in The Russian Messenger.

== Plot ==
The story concerns the love and marriage of a young girl, Mashechka (17 years old), and the much older Sergey Mikhaylych (36), an old family friend. The story is narrated by Masha (Mashechka). After a courtship that has the trappings of a mere family friendship, Masha's love grows and expands until she can no longer contain it. She reveals it to Sergey Mikhaylych and discovers that he also is deeply in love. If he has resisted her it was because of his fear that the age difference between them would lead the very young Masha to tire of him. He likes to be still and quiet, he tells her, while she will want to explore and discover more and more about life. Ecstatically and passionately happy, the pair immediately engages to be married. Once married they move to Sergey Mikhaylych's home. They are both members of the landed Russian upper class. Masha soon feels impatient with the quiet order of life on the estate, notwithstanding the powerful understanding and love that remains between the two. To assuage her anxiety, they decide to spend a few weeks in St. Petersburg. Sergey Mikhaylych agrees to take Masha to an aristocratic ball. He hates "society" but she is enchanted with it. They go again, and then again. She becomes a regular, the darling of the countesses and princes, with her rural charm and her beauty. Sergey Mikhaylych, at first very pleased with Petersburg society's enthusiasm for his wife, frowns on her passion for "society"; however, he does not try to influence Masha. Out of respect for her, Sergey Mikhaylych will scrupulously allow his young wife to discover the truth about the emptiness and ugliness of "society" on her own. But his trust in her is damaged as he watches how dazzled she is by this world. Finally they confront each other about their differences. They argue but do not treat their conflict as something that can be resolved through negotiation. Both are shocked and mortified that their intense love has suddenly been called into question. Something has changed. Because of pride, they both refuse to talk about it. The trust and the closeness are gone. Only courteous friendship remains. Masha yearns to return to the passionate closeness they had known before Petersburg. They go back to the country. Though she gives birth to children and the couple has a good life, she despairs. They can barely be together by themselves. Finally she asks him to explain why he did not try to guide and direct her away from the balls and the parties in Petersburg. Why did they lose their intense love? Why don't they try to bring it back? His answer is not the answer she wants to hear, but it settles her down and prepares her for a long life of comfortable "Family Happiness."

== Critical reception ==
In Russia the initial response to Family Happiness was lukewarm. The newspaper Sankt-Peterburgskiye Vedomosti (the July 1859, No. 155 issue) and the magazine Severny Tsvetok (Northern Flower, No. 22 1859) published positive, but very brief reviews. The major pro-democracy publications failed to mention its release, much chagrined, apparently, by the fact that Tolstoy chose for the publication the right-wing Katkov-edited journal which at the time was engaged in bitter feuds with Sovremennik.

Three years later in an essay called "The Outstanding Works Overlooked by Our Critics" (Vremya, Nos. 1 and 9) Apollon Grigoriev made an attempt to "rehabilitate" the Family Happiness and called it Tolstoy's "best piece of work to date." Sovremennik (1865, No.4) retaliated by warning the "critics of the aesthetic school" against praising the backward-looking novel that was idealizing the ruling class's way of life. According to the Soviet scholar Vladimir Lakshin, "Grigoriev was right in crediting Tolstoy as a shrewd psychologist, who'd succeeded in portraying so vividly in this novella 'the way romantic passion gradually deteriorates into something completely different.'"

== Adaptations ==
A British radio adaptation aired on March 28, 1955, written by actress May Agate (Note: Younger sister of British theatre critic James Agate.) and starring Adrienne Corri and John Arnatt. In 1959, the novel was adapted for television by playwright Morton Wishengrad, for the American dramatic anthology series U.S. Steel Hour. Directed by Sidney Lumet, the episode aired in February, starring Gloria Vanderbilt, Jean Pierre Aumont, and Patty Duke.

== In popular culture ==
As referenced in the non-fiction book Into the Wild (as well as its film adaptation), a copy of Family Happiness was found among Chris McCandless' remains, with several passages highlighted.

The last page of the story is also quoted in full in the Philip Roth novel The Counterlife.

The novella is referenced in 4321 by Paul Auster, as the favorite Tolstoy work of the protagonist's mother.

The Mountain Goats song "Family Happiness" takes its name from the novella and includes the line "Started quoting Tolstoy into the machine/I had no idea what you meant".

The 2012 film of Julia Strachey's 1932 novel Cheerful Weather For the Wedding shows Dolly, the uncertain bride-to-be reading a copy of Family Happiness.

Pyotr Fomenko's Theater Atelier in Moscow adapted the novella to the stage. The play premiered in September 2000 and remains part of the theater's repertoire.

== See also ==
- Leo Tolstoy bibliography
