= Furniss v Dawson =

Furniss v. Dawson
- Court: House of Lords
- Full case name: Furniss (Inspector of Taxes) v. Dawson D.E.R., Furniss (Inspector of Taxes) v. Dawson G.E., Murdoch (Inspector of Taxes) v. Dawson R.S.
- Citations: [1983] UKHL 4, [1984] 1 All ER 530, [1984] AC 474, [1984] STC 153, [1984] 2 W.L.R. 226

Court membership
- Judges sitting: Lord Fraser of Tullybelton, Lord Scarman, Lord Roskill, Lord Bridge of Harwich and Lord Brightman

Furniss v Dawson [1983] UKHL 4 is an important House of Lords case in the field of UK tax that extended the applicability of The Ramsay Principle. This came from W. T. Ramsay Ltd. v. Inland Revenue Commissioners [1982] AC 300 where a company had made a substantial capital gain and entered into a complex and self-cancelling series of transactions that generated an artificial capital loss. The House of Lords held that where a transaction has pre-arranged artificial steps which serve no commercial purpose other than to save tax, then the proper approach is to tax the effect of the transaction as a whole.

== Facts ==
The three respondents, the Dawsons, were a father and his two sons. They owned two successful clothing companies called Fordham and Burton Ltd. and Kirkby Garments Ltd. (which are together called "the operating companies" throughout the case).

- A company called Wood Bastow Holdings Ltd. offered to buy the operating companies from the Dawsons, and a price was agreed.
- If the Dawsons had sold the operating companies direct to Wood Bastow the Dawsons would have had to pay substantial capital gains tax ("CGT").
- There was a rule that if a person sold his shares in Company A to Company B, and instead of receiving cash he received shares in Company B, then there was no CGT payable immediately. Instead, CGT would become payable when (if ever) that person later sold his shares in company B.
- With the intention of taking advantage of this rule to delay the payment of CGT, the Dawsons arranged for an Isle of Man company called Greenjacket Investments Ltd. to be formed. (It was intended to become "Company B".)
- The Dawsons sold the operating companies to Greenjacket Investments Ltd. in exchange for the shares of Greenjacket Investments Ltd.
- Greenjacket Investments Ltd. sold the operating companies to Wood Bastow Holdings Ltd.

=== Arguments ===
The Dawsons argued:

1. that the CGT rule mentioned above worked in their favour and they could not be taxed until such time (if ever) as they sold their shares in Greenjacket Investments Ltd.; and
2. that the Ramsay Principle did not apply, since what they had done had "real" enduring consequences.

The tax authorities argued:

1. that Greenjacket Investments Ltd. only existed as a vehicle to create a tax saving;
2. that the effect of the transaction as a whole was that the Dawsons had sold the operating companies to Wood Bastow Holdings Ltd.;
3. that because the intervening stages of the transaction had only been inserted to generate a tax saving, they were to be ignored under the Ramsay Principle, and instead the effect of the transaction should be taxed; and
4. that the transaction being "real" (which is to say, not a sham) was not enough to save it from falling within the Ramsay Principle.

The Court of Appeal had given a judgement agreeing with the Dawsons on these points.

== Judgment ==
The judgement of the court was given by Lord Brightman. The other four judges (Lord Fraser of Tullybelton, Lord Scarman, Lord Roskill and Lord Bridge of Harwich) gave shorter judgements agreeing with Lord Brightman's more detailed judgement.

The court decided in favour of the Inland Revenue (as it then was: it is now HM Revenue and Customs).

The judgement can be viewed as a battle between:

- extending the principle in the Duke of Westminster's Case (Inland Revenue Commissioners v. Duke of Westminster [1936] A.C. 1); and
- extending the Ramsay Principle;

two conflicting ideas which could, at their extremes, be expressed as:

- a rule that any taxpayer may organise his affairs in any way he wishes (provided it is legal) so as to minimise tax (Westminster) and
- a rule that a taxpayer will be taxed on the effect of his transactions, not upon the way he has chosen to organise them for tax purposes (Ramsay).

Lord Brightman came down firmly in favour of an extension of the Ramsay Principle. He said that the appeal court judge (Oliver L. J.), by finding for the Dawsons and favouring the Westminster rule, had wrongly limited the Ramsay Principle (as it had been expressed by Lord Diplock in a case called IRC v. Burmah Oil Co. Ltd.). Lord Brightman said:

The effect of his [Oliver L. J.'s] judgment was to change Lord Diplock's formulation from "a pre-ordained series of transactions ... into which there are inserted steps that have no commercial purpose apart from the avoidance of a liability to tax" to "a pre-ordained series of transactions ... into which there are inserted steps that have no enduring legal consequences." That would confine the Ramsay principle to so-called self-cancelling transactions.

Oliver L. J. had given considerable weight to the fact that the existence of Greenjacket Investments Ltd. was real and had enduring consequences. At the end of the transaction, the Dawsons did not own the money which had been paid by Wood Bastow Ltd.: instead, Greenjacket Investments Ltd. owned that money and the Dawsons owned Greenjacket Investments Limited. Legally speaking, those are two very different situations. However Lord Brightman saw this as irrelevant. In any case where a predetermined series of transactions contains steps which are only there for the purpose of avoiding tax, the tax is to be calculated on the effect of the composite transaction as a whole.

== Significance ==
Furniss v. Dawson has had far-reaching consequences. It applies not only to capital gains tax but to all forms of direct taxation. It also applies in some of the jurisdictions where decisions of the English courts have precedential value.

== See also ==
- English trust law
- UK tax law
