= Ramsay principle =

House of Lords decision

"Ramsay principle" is the shorthand name given to the decision of the House of Lords in two important cases in the field of UK tax, reported in 1982:

- Ramsay v. IRC, the full name of which is W. T. Ramsay Ltd. v. Inland Revenue Commissioners, Eilbeck (Inspector of Taxes) v. Rawling, and its citation is [1982] A.C. 300.
- IRC v. Burmah Oil Co. Ltd., the full name of which is Inland Revenue Commissioners v. Burmah Oil Co. Ltd., and its citation is [1982] S.T.C. 30, H.L.(Sc.).

In summary, companies that had made substantial capital gains had entered into complex and self-cancelling series of transactions that had generated artificial capital losses, for the purpose of avoiding capital gains tax. The House of Lords decided that where a transaction has pre-arranged artificial steps that serve no commercial purpose other than to save tax, the proper approach is to tax the effect of the transaction as a whole.

The decision is not limited to capital gains tax, but applies to all forms of direct taxation, and is an important restraint on the ability of taxpayers to engage in creative tax planning.

== Facts (Ramsay v. IRC) ==
The important facts are set out in the following quotation from Lord Wilberforce:.

[This] is an appeal by W. T. Ramsay Ltd., a farming company. In its accounting period ending May 31, 1973, it made a "chargeable gain" for the purposes of corporation tax by a sale-leaseback transaction. This gain it desired to counteract, so as to avoid the tax, by establishing an allowable loss. The method chosen was to purchase from a company specialising in such matters a ready-made scheme. The general nature of this was to create out of a neutral situation two assets one of which would decrease in value for the benefit of the other. The decreasing asset would be sold, so as to create the desired loss; the increasing asset would be sold, yielding a gain that it was hoped would be exempt from tax.

The two assets in question were loans of equal amounts, which had an unusual condition: Ramsay Ltd. was entitled, once, to reduce the rate of interest on one loan, provided that the rate of interest on the other loan increased by the same amount. Ramsay Ltd. exercised this right, such that one loan became worth far more than its original value, and the other far less. The loan that had gained in value was disposed of in such a way that it was intended to be exempt from tax as "debt" (sec. 251 [2] TCGA 1992: Where a person incurs a debt to another, whether in sterling or in some other currency, no chargeable gain shall accrue to that [that is the original] creditor or his personal representative or legatee on a disposal of the debt, except in the case of the debt on a security [as defined in section 132]), while the loan that had fallen in value was disposed of in such a way that it was intended to be a deductible capital loss. Funding for the entire transaction was provided by a finance house, on terms such that the money would inevitably pass round in a circle, and back into their hands again, within a few days, with interest.

The House of Lords rejected the idea that there was any exemption from tax under the "debt on a security" rule. However, that was not the basis of their decision, which was a more far-reaching principle.

== Facts (Eilbeck v. Rawling) ==
Some types of interests in trusts are "assets" of a kind that can be bought, sold, and be subjected to CGT. Other types of interests in trusts are not "assets" in that sense. The taxpayer in this case, Mr Rawling, tried to take advantage of that fact by entering into the following transactions:

- On day 1, two trusts were created:
  1. a Gibraltar trust, of the kind in which a reversionary interest would be a taxable asset.
  2. a Jersey trust, of the kind in which Mr Rawling's interest would not be a taxable asset.
- It was a term of the Gibraltar trust that its trustees could make appointments of money to the Jersey trust.
- On day 2, Mr Rawling bought a reversionary interest in the Gibraltar trust.
- On day 3, The trustees of the Gibraltar trust appointed £315,000 to the Jersey trust.
- On day 4, Mr Rawling sold his reversionary interest in the Gibraltar trust at its new market value, making a substantial loss since the asset was worth far less than it had been on day 2.
- It was not a coincidence that the loss was a little under £315,000: just enough to cover an unrelated taxable capital gain Mr Rawling had made in the same year.

The court rejected the idea that there had in fact been any loss. Lord Russell said, quite bluntly:

I wholly fail to comprehend the contention that the taxpayer sustained a loss.

His reasoning was that Mr Rawling had an interest in the Jersey trust, anyway, so there simply had not been any loss on the sale of the interest in the Gibraltar trust. Also, all of the money needed to fund these trusts, and to purchase the interests in them, had been provided by a company called Thun Ltd., on terms that it would all be paid back to Thun Ltd. after the transactions had been completed. (Indeed, the court doubted that there had ever been any real money, at all: the whole matter appears to have been dealt with by means of paper accounting entries.)

However (as with the Ramsay case above) the core of the decision was not related to the judges' disagreement with the detail of the taxpayer's case. Instead it was based on a more fundamental principle (The Ramsay Principle) explained under "Judgements" below.

Note that the facts have been simplified for ease of explanation, and that the actual transaction was rather more complex.

== "Particles" in a gas chamber ==
Lord Wilberforce described the transactions in the Ramsay and Rawling cases with this colourful (if not necessarily scientifically accurate) simile:

In each case two assets appear, like "particles" in a gas chamber with opposite charges, one of which is used to create the loss, the other of which gives rise to an equivalent gain that prevents the taxpayer from supporting any real loss and whose gain is intended not to be taxable. Like the particles, these assets have a very short life. Having served their purpose they cancel each other out and disappear. At the end of the series of operations, the taxpayer's financial position is precisely as it was at the beginning, except that he has paid a fee, and certain expenses, to the promoter of the scheme.

== Facts (IRC v. Burmah Oil) ==
In this case, the Burmah Oil group had suffered a genuine loss on the sale of an investment. However, the loss was not of the right kind to be deductible for tax purposes. Accordingly, the company's accountants and lawyers formulated a plan to "crystalise" that loss into a deductible form. They did this by entering into a series of (perfectly genuine) inter-group transactions, the overall effect of which was that the loss already incurred became a deductible capital loss on the liquidation of one of the subsidiaries in the group. These transactions were made using Burmah Oil's own money, and were therefore quite different from the pre-arranged, marketed "schemes" using borrowed money in the Ramsay and Eilbeck cases.

The judges were quite clear that they would have found in favour of Burmah Oil, and against the IRC, had it not been for the decision in the Ramsay case, some months before.

== Judgments ==
In the Ramsay case, Lord Wilberforce distinguished three ingredients of the schemes involved

1. that there was a "clear and stated intention that once started each scheme shall proceed through the various steps to the end" whether admitted or implied;
2. that the taxpayer does not need to use his own funds, typically provided by a financial group with only the customer's security, and that by the end of the scheme his financial position is unchanged (other than in providing fees and expenses to the scheme's promoter), so that "in some cases one may doubt whether, in any real sense, any money existed at all"; and
3. the key ingredient, that "it is candidly, if inevitably, admitted that the whole and only purpose of each scheme was the avoidance of tax".

Wilberforce summed up the emerging principle

It is the task of the court to ascertain the legal nature of any transaction to which it is sought to attach a tax or a tax consequence and if that emerges from a series or combination of transactions intended to operate as such, it is the series or combination which may be regarded.

He ruled that in the particular facts of Ramsay

[It would be] a faulty analysis, to pick out, and stop at, the one step in the combination which produced the loss, that being entirely dependent upon, and merely, a reflection of the gain. The true view, regarding the scheme as a whole, is to find that there was neither gain nor loss, and so I conclude.

The core of the Ramsay Principle is to be found in the Burmah Oil case in this remark by Lord Diplock:

It would be disingenuous to suggest, and dangerous on the part of those who advise on elaborate tax-avoidance schemes to assume, that Ramsay's case did not mark a significant change in the approach adopted by this House in its judicial role to a pre-ordained series of transaction (whether or not they include the achievement of a legitimate commercial end) into which there are inserted steps that have no commercial purpose apart from the avoidance of a liability to tax that, in the absence of those particular steps, would have been payable.

== Developments ==
More recent cases have tended to move away from a narrow focus on disregarding circular transactions and inserted pre-ordained steps with no commercial purpose. A number of tax counsel have cited the following comments by Ribeiro PJ in Collector of Stamp Revenue v Arrowtown Assets Ltd [2003] HKCFA 46, para 35 with approval as an authoritative statement of the prevailing view of the judiciary on the application of legislation in tax avoidance cases:

The driving principle in the Ramsay line of cases continues to involve a general rule of statutory construction and an unblinkered approach to the analysis of the facts. The ultimate question is whether the relevant statutory provisions, construed purposively, were intended to apply to the transaction, viewed realistically.

== See also ==
- Duke of Westminster's Case
- Furniss v Dawson
