= TLH =

TLH or tlh may mean:

- Tax loss harvesting, an investment technique
- The Loud House, a 2016 cartoon broadcast on Nickelodeon
- The Lutheran Hymnal, first published in 1941
- Transcendental law of homogeneity, in mathematics
- Trans-Labrador Highway, a highway in eastern Canada
- Tréfileries et Laminoirs du Havre (Le Havre Wire-Drawing and Rolling Mills), a French manufacturer of copper products
- TLH, the IATA code for Tallahassee International Airport in the state of Florida, US
- tlh, the ISO 639-3 code for the Klingon language, a fictional constructed language spoken in the Star Trek universe
- TLH, the National Rail code for Tilehurst railway station in the county of Berkshire, UK
- Total laparoscopic hysterectomy
