= Split in darts =

Dispute in professional darts, 1993 to 2020

The split in darts refers to the acrimonious 1993 dispute between professional darts players and the game's governing body, the British Darts Organisation (BDO), resulting in the creation of a rival darts circuit under the banner of the World Darts Council, which eventually became the Professional Darts Corporation (PDC).

Darts had boomed as a televised sport in Britain in the 1980s, and the resulting influx of sponsorship and prize money allowed many players to turn professional. But by the end of the decade, television coverage had dropped to just one tournament. In 1993, 16 top players, disillusioned by the BDO's running of the sport and what they saw as its inability to reverse the decline in television coverage and sponsorship, left the BDO to run their own tournaments as the World Darts Council (WDC).

The BDO responded by imposing a worldwide ban on the rebel players and anyone who associated with them. A costly four year legal battle ensued, culminating in a compromise Tomlin order in 1997. The BDO lifted the ban and formally recognised the WDC and the right of players to freely participate in darts competitions. In return, the WDC dropped its claim to being a world governing body and renamed itself the Professional Darts Corporation. Thereafter, each organisation had its own pool of players and tournaments, and each staged its own version of the World Professional Darts Championship.

The BDO folded into administration in September 2020 and the World Darts Federation took over control of BDO events, so the split in darts remains. The WDF subsequently established its own version of the World Darts Championship and the inaugural event took place in 2022.

== Background ==
=== The darts boom ===
The British Darts Organisation (BDO) was formed in 1973 by Olly Croft. It gradually superseded the existing National Darts Association of Great Britain (NDAGB) as the governing body of darts in the UK and by the early 1980s had established a monopoly on organised darts in Britain, running super league darts, county darts and major tournaments, including the annual World Championship. The BDO became a founder member of the World Darts Federation in 1974. The BDO would preside over darts' rise from a pub game to a worldwide sport.

Darts first appeared on British television in May 1937 when the BBC broadcast a darts and shove ha'penny competition from Alexandra Palace. In 1962, Westward Television broadcast the Westward TV Invitational to the south-west of England. In 1972, ITV started broadcasting the News of the World Championship. ITV producer Donald Baverstock stated:

"Twelve thousand darts fans turn up at the Ally Pally drunk as skunks. They cheer on their heroes just like a football crowd. They have banners, gonks, rattles, the lot. It will be great telly."

The following year, ITV commissioned The Indoor League, a series presented by Fred Trueman and produced by Sid Waddell which showcased various indoor sports and games; one of its features was a darts tournament involving some of the world's best players. Initially only shown in the Yorkshire Television region, it was broadcast throughout Britain on the ITV network from the second series onwards. Its venue, the Leeds Irish Centre, was recognised in 2010 as "the birthplace of TV darts".

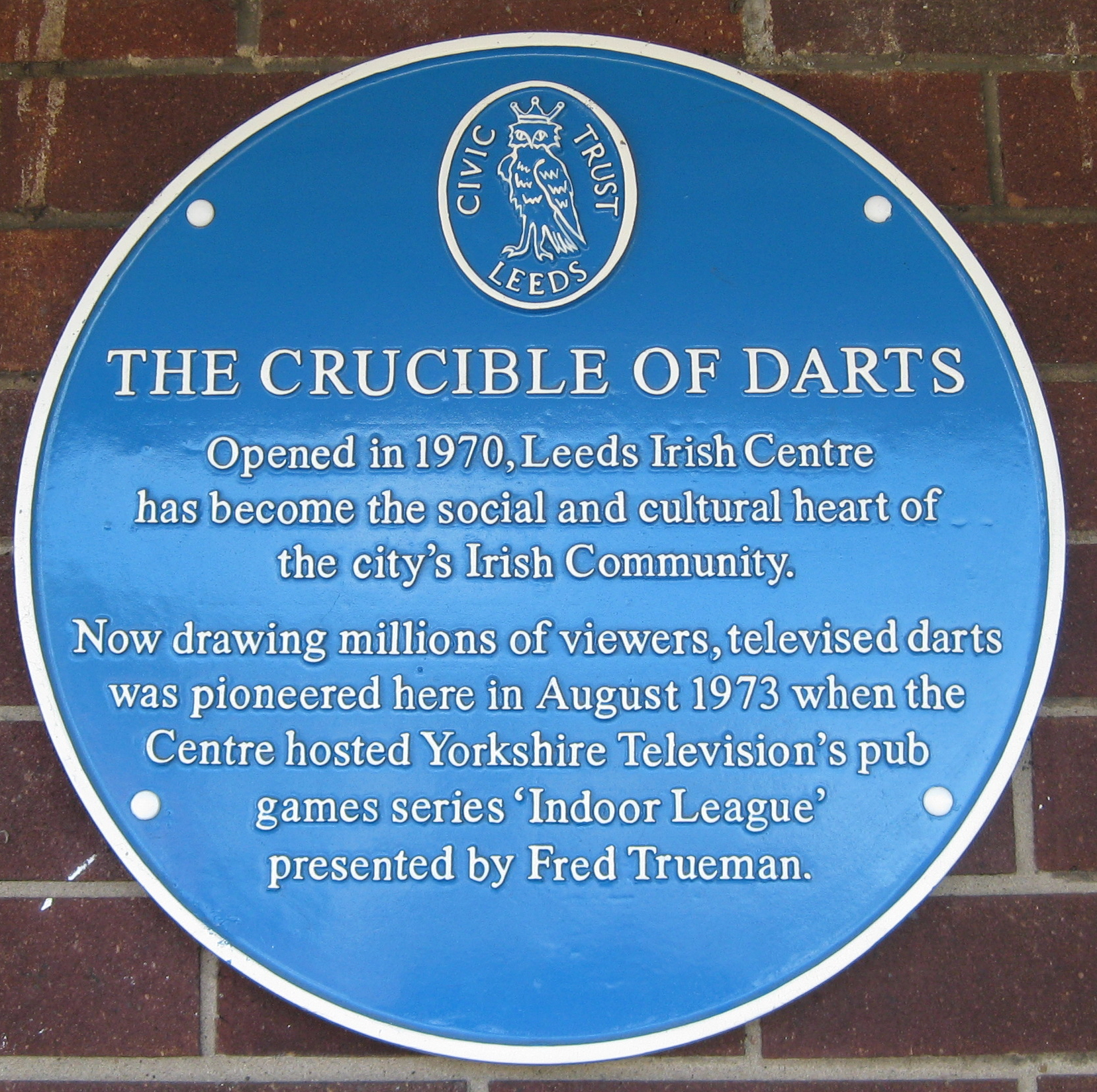
Plaque commemorating The Indoor League and the birth of televised darts

Televised darts proliferated during the 1970s and 1980s. ITV began covering the new World Masters in 1974. The BBC soon followed suit; its first event was the British Open in 1975. Then, in 1978, the BBC picked up the inaugural World Professional Darts Championship, in part because it was "a cheap way to fill the schedules at a time of year when the rest of the sporting programme was decimated by weather." Other major events which emerged included the MFI World Matchplay and MFI World Pairs, the BDO Gold Cup, the British Professional Championship, the Butlins Grand Masters and the World Cup.

By 1983, there were 23 televised events. In that year's world final, Keith Deller, a qualifier and 66/1 tournament outsider, defeated the heavily-favoured Eric Bristow 6–5 in an epic match. Described as the sport's zenith in its first boom period, it was watched by a Saturday afternoon audience of 8.3 million, a record for a darts match. Darts was also the centrepiece of a new gameshow, Bullseye, which aired from 1981 to 1995 and attracted audiences of 20 million at its peak; virtually every darts player of note would appear on the show. Players like Eric Bristow, Jocky Wilson, John Lowe and Bobby George became household names. The abundance of prize money, sponsorship and television coverage, and with it the increased demand for exhibitions, meant that many top players were able to become full-time professionals.

=== Decline ===
Darts players smoked and drank alcohol on stage, a reflection of the game's origins in pubs. In 1980, this was mocked in a sketch on the satirical BBC comedy show Not the Nine O'Clock News. The sketch features a match between two overweight darts players, played by Griff Rhys Jones and Mel Smith, but instead of throwing darts, they take turns drinking shots of alcohol while a Geordie commentator (voiced by Rowan Atkinson) narrates the action ("single pint... double vodka...") as they get progressively more drunk. The sketch is often blamed for damaging darts' public image and reducing it to a laughing stock. Eric Bristow felt it "didn't do the sport any favours, especially with the media luvvies who ruled the BBC and the other channels." According to darts historian Patrick Chaplin, it "indelibly seared the 'fat belly' image of darts players into the minds of the nation forever."

In 1984, the British Gold Cup (BBC), Butlins Grand Masters (Central) and British Matchplay (ITV) were all dropped from television schedules. A bigger blow came in September 1985 when ITV cancelled its long-running World of Sport, which had shown darts on a regular basis. However, 1988 was "cataclysmic" for the sport. At the start of the year there were still 14 televised events, but then the BBC decided to cut down on "minority" sports like darts and consequently reduced its darts coverage to just one tournament. Then, shortly afterwards, ITV cancelled all of its darts coverage, which had included the World Masters and the World Matchplay. Tournaments shown on ITV regional channels were dropped too. The only televised event that remained by 1989 was the Embassy World Championship. John Lowe called this "the darts world's equivalent of the Wall Street crash."

Sid Waddell said "it was the yuppie era that did for us." He added: "they [television executives] thought the audience was all Cs, Ds and Es, all yobs." Darts had not lost viewers, but Greg Dyke, ITV's director of programmes, wanted to attract younger and more affluent audiences to the channel. He associated darts with older people and lower income groups, saying: "It's all about image. Young viewers are just not interested." Alan Yentob, who became controller of BBC2 in 1987, had a similar negative view of darts.

While the decline of television coverage was partly due to policy changes at the BBC and ITV, the BDO were also blamed for allowing the game to stagnate and not doing enough to improve its image. Dick Allix, manager of Eric Bristow, said "If the BDO wants to accept the accolades of success, it must accept the responsibility of failure." The BDO banned smoking on stage during matches in 1988, which was followed soon afterwards by a ban on alcohol. However, it had little impact and more televised darts did not materialise. As Bobby George put it: "It made no difference at all to the fading interest in the game... They [the BDO] thought if beer and fags were banned, everything in the garden would be rosy again, but that didn't turn out to be the case."

== Players' unrest ==
Several players had longstanding grievances with the BDO and its running of darts, such as why players had no say in how events were run and why players lost money when they played in international matches. Players were not allowed to wear personal sponsors when playing in competitions, but had to promote the BDO's sponsors. John Lowe noted that he was obliged to advertise Winmau, a BDO sponsor, on his shirts for free even though he was sponsored by Unicorn, a competitor of Winmau. Eric Bristow argued that the players did not receive a fair share of the money now coming into the game, and that while the BDO excelled at bringing through amateur players, it was ill-equipped to support the top-32 professionals. When told by Olly Croft that "the BDO put you where you are today", Lowe replied: "Have you ever considered that I and the other professionals all helped to put the BDO where they are today?" Meetings were held in which the players aired their concerns, but little changed.

However, there was no serious player unrest until darts' popularity started to wane in the mid-1980s. As major tournaments disappeared, this meant reduced prize money, sponsorship and television exposure, which in turn led to fewer bookings for exhibition matches. Players who had become full-time professionals during the boom years were no longer able to make a living from the sport and began to voice their concerns. They felt that not enough was being done by the BDO to encourage new sponsors and increase television coverage from more than one event per year. Rod Harrington summarised the players' issue: "The trouble with the BDO is that, after the world championships and its great prize money, there is virtually nothing. The top players simply can't earn a living on one event."

Croft himself also received criticism. Some players and managers resented the level of control he and the BDO had over darts; his attitude was variously described as "dictatorial" or "autocratic". In response to player concerns, Croft said: "It's like your children. They say: 'can I have an ice cream?' and you say: 'no'. We don't owe anyone a living."

Another issue arose shortly after the 1992 World Championship, when the BDO and the BBC released a VHS videotape featuring extended highlights of that year's world final between Phil Taylor and Mike Gregory. It also included highlights of the 1983, 1985 and 1987 World Championship finals involving Eric Bristow, John Lowe and Keith Deller, and Paul Lim's 9-dart finish at the 1990 World Championship. Neither the players, nor their representatives, were consulted in advance or offered payment; the BDO argued that the players had signed over all their rights and so were not entitled to notice or payment.

In December 1986, the Professional Dart Players Association (PDPA) was formed to represent the players, but the BDO refused to recognise the body. In August 1988, a pressure group named the Darts Council was formed by a group of players and their agents. In January 1992, 16 professional players, including every previous BDO World Champion who was still active, created their own darts organisation named the World Darts Council (WDC). They wanted to appoint a public relations consultant to improve the image of the game and to get more tournaments on television. The WDC staged their first televised event in October 1992 (the Lada UK Masters on Anglia Television).

According to Bristow, he approached Croft on behalf of the WDC players shortly before the 1993 Embassy World Championship to air the players' concerns.

I said, "Ollie, can you give us more than one tournament a year on TV?"

"No," he said.

"OK," I replied. Would you mind if we ran our own tournaments on TV, because our livelihood is being affected here?"

"Yes, I would mind," he said.

"OK, if we did run our own tournaments on television, what would happen?"

"You'll be banned."

== The 1993 World Championship ==
The WDC badge worn at the 1993 World Championship.

The 1993 World Championship was the last time that all the players played in one unified world darts championship. The WDC players wore their new insignia on their sleeves during the tournament, but were told to remove them by the BDO. The WDC players decided that if they were not going to be recognised by the BDO they would no longer play in the tournament. The BDO did not allow the WDC players to set up their own tournaments and the players decided to go their own way.

On 7 January 1993, the 16 WDC players released a statement saying that they would only participate in the 1994 World Championship if it came under the auspices of the WDC, and that they only recognised the WDC as having the authority to sanction their participation in darts tournaments worldwide. On 24 January 1993, a couple of weeks after the 1993 World Championship had ended, the BDO responded by suspending the 16 "rebel" players from all BDO tournaments on British soil.

The 16 WDC players who signed the 7 January 1993 statement were:

- Phil Taylor
- Dennis Priestley
- Rod Harrington
- John Lowe
- Alan Warriner
- Eric Bristow
- Jocky Wilson
- Bob Anderson
- Peter Evison
- Jamie Harvey
- Ritchie Gardner
- Cliff Lazarenko
- Kevin Spiolek
- Keith Deller
- Mike Gregory
- Chris Johns

The list included every previous world darts champion, with the exception of Leighton Rees, the first world champion from 1978, who was not an active player when the split happened.

== Worldwide ban ==
=== BDO and WDF sanctions ===
On 25 April 1993, at a meeting in Finchley, the BDO took the step of turning the suspension of the WDC players from playing in any BDO-run tournaments on British soil, into a full-scale ban on the WDC players from being able to play any BDO-sanctioned darts, even down to county level. The BDO also passed a motion which said that any BDO players who participated in exhibition events with WDC players, would also be banned from the BDO. The BDO passed the following motions at the 25 April 1993 Finchley meeting:

- Any British Darts Organisation official, or British Darts Organisation player, who is associated with the activities of the World Darts Council shall forfeit the right to organise, attend or participate in any events under the jurisdiction of the British Darts Organisation, or its members, until written undertaking is given that they are no longer associated with the World Darts Council or its activities. Motion passed by 57 votes for to 0 votes against.
- All member counties shall refrain from attending, or assisting in, any exhibitions involving the 16 players named in the World Darts Council statement of 7 January 1993, any players who have affiliated to the World Darts Council since that date, and any players who may affiliate to the World Darts Council in the future. Motion passed by 54 votes for to 1 vote against.
- All member counties shall exclude any players who are affiliated to the World Darts Council from darts events under their jurisdiction. Motion passed by 60 votes for to 0 votes against.

On 18 October 1993, at a WDF meeting in Las Vegas, the BDO sought to have their bans on the WDC players officially ratified and set in stone on a world scale in the WDF rules, and the Welsh WDF representative moved the motion that the WDC players be referred to as the "former top players". The motion passed by 24 votes for to 3 votes against.

Two countries who voted against the motion at the Las Vegas meeting, the USA and Canada, were the only two countries whose WDF affiliates refused to sanction the ban even after the vote, saying that what they were being asked to do was against their countries' constitutions, and would therefore be breaking the law. The WDC took advantage of this to invite 7 American darts players to play in the 1994 WDC World Darts Championship.

=== Player ban ===
The ban on the WDC players was enforced rigorously. According to Sid Waddell, "The BDO's use of the phrase 'associating with' WDC people had become a licence for every little witch-finder in every nook and cranny of their organisation. Whatever Croft and his allies in Muswell Hill intended, between the Finchley meeting in spring 1993 and the pre-court case proceedings in 1997 some terrible things were being reported." Pub teams were warned they faced a ban from competitions if their pubs hosted exhibitions by the rebel players; Phil Taylor's cousin, a Staffordshire county player, was warned not to associate with him; some officials lost their jobs after taking part in WDC events. WDC players were prevented from playing county matches. One zealous BDO official tried to document members of the audience at a Rod Harrington exhibition so they could be banned."

Paul Lim was banned from WDF events after joining the WDC in 1994. Kevin Burrows, a semi-professional player who qualified for the WDC's inaugural 1994 World Championship was blacklisted from all levels of BDO darts for participating in the rebel tournament. In 1997, Richie Burnett, John Part and Alan Evans all received a ban from BDO competitions for playing in a special "Battle of the Champions" event broadcast on Sky Sports against WDC players Phil Taylor, Dennis Priestley and Eric Bristow. Waddell himself, who was sympathetic to the WDC players and helped them set up some of their early tournaments, recalled being treated "like a pariah" at the 1994 BDO world championship.

However, the ban was not enforced universally and was not applied at all in America and Canada, whose WDF delegates had voted against banning the WDC players. Shayne Burgess, who joined the WDC in 1994, claimed "the Canadians didn't give a toss about the split" and let him play in the Canadian Open. An exception was also made for the revived News of the World Championship, held from 1996–97. As the tournament was independently run with no official WDC or BDO involvement, players were advised that they could participate in the event without penalty. Ultimately, the final was contested by a WDC representative (Phil Taylor) and a BDO representative (Ian White).

== The rebels ==
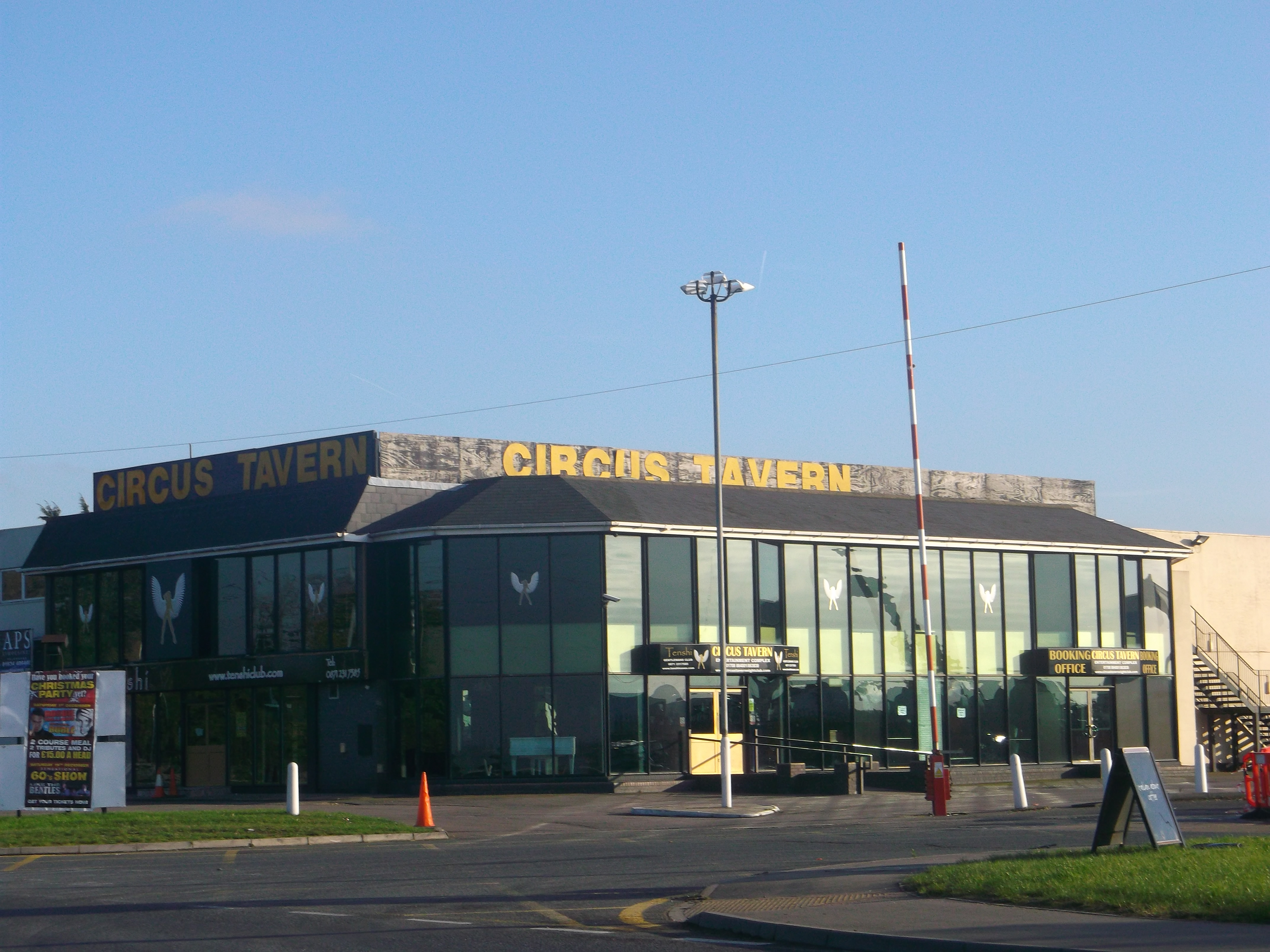
The Circus Tavern in Purfleet, Essex, which hosted the first WDC World Championship in 1994

After the worldwide ban was imposed, the sixteen WDC players were "cast into the darting wilderness, able to play only amongst themselves, their future uncertain." Banned from the Embassy World Championship, they resolved to stage their own version. Moreover, the emergence of satellite television gave them a new option: Sky Sports, who had recently purchased the broadcast rights to English football's new Premier League. In 1993, Sky and the WDC announced an exclusive deal to broadcast the WDC World Championship, to be held in December 1993/January 1994 at the Circus Tavern in Purfleet, and a new World Matchplay event which would take place in 1994. Lager manufacturer Skol would sponsor both events. Other new events were also established and shown in different ITV regions: the UK Masters (Anglia Television), the UK Matchplay (Yorkshire Television) and the Samson Classic (Tyne Tees Television).

But there was trouble ahead for the rebels. Chris Johns decided to return to the BDO to play in a Welsh international match before the Sky deal was announced. Then, in November 1993, just weeks before the WDC world championship was due to start, Mike Gregory also had a change of heart and returned to the BDO. John Lowe felt that Gregory had succumbed to pressure from Olly Croft, who warned that he would lose his house if the WDC lost its case. Eric Bristow wrote in his autobiography: "Mike's decision to leave hurt us badly because he was a good player and the good players really did need to show solidarity. When he defected back to the BDO we were down to fourteen and panic was setting in." Gregory's defection also threatened the WDC's deal with Sky Sports, as the contract stipulated that all WDC players were to participate in the World Championship. Ultimately, Sky agreed to honour the deal, on condition that no other players withdrew from the tournament.

Despite continued pressure and rumours of further defections, the remaining 14 players held firm and the 1994 WDC World Championship went ahead. Besides the 14 rebels, it featured two more English players willing to defy the BDO sanctions, Graeme Stoddart and Kevin Burrows, Irishman Tom Kirby and seven Americans. The latter were invited after the American WDF delegates voted against the worldwide ban and refused to implement it. The 1994 BDO World Championship took place with a largely unknown field, including 17 debutants, although Bobby George produced a resurgent performance to reach the final. The BDO event kept its contract with the BBC and began to bring through a new generation of players.

== Legal action and Tomlin Order ==
After the worldwide ban was imposed, the WDC sued the BDO for lost earnings and restraint of trade. They argued that the BDO enjoyed an unfair monopoly on organising events, and that the BDO's actions were "unlawful [and] imposed unfairly, in breach of the BDO's own rules". They further argued that the ban violated European Union law. They also cited as a precedent Tony Greig and John Snow's case against the International Cricket Council over the breakaway World Series Cricket in the 1970s. The two sides would spend over £300,000 on legal fees. At one point, Dick Allix had to arrange an emergency £20,000 loan to cover legal fees. John Raby, Tommy Cox and the players themselves all contributed their own money towards the legal expenses.

On 30 June 1997, days before the case reached the High Court, the BDO and the WDC representatives reached a compromise in the form of a Tomlin order. The Guardian summarized: "the BDO lost its case". The judge agreed that the right of the WDC players to carry out of their profession as darts players had been unreasonably restricted. The BDO lifted the worldwide ban on the WDC players, recognized the WDC and its right to stage professional competitions, and agreed that all players could freely participate in tournaments and exhibitions. In return, the WDC dropped their damages claim for loss of earnings and agreed to remove the word 'world' from their name, renaming themselves the Professional Darts Corporation (PDC). The PDC recognized the WDF as the governing body for darts worldwide, and the BDO the governing body for darts in the UK.

Speaking afterwards, Eric Bristow called it "a great day for the sport of darts". He added, "for the first time in four years I am free to play darts in competitions all over the world... this action was never about money but our freedom to play who we liked on a local or international level, and where we liked." Olly Croft said he was "not disappointed" by the result. He confirmed there would continue to be two world championships, but "our champion will be champion of half a million players throughout the world. Theirs will be champion of 20-odd."

== Player eligibility ==
After the Tomlin Order, all darts players were eligible to enter any darts competition run by the PDC, the BDO or the WDF. From 1998-2001, some BDO-affiliated players competed in the PDC's World Matchplay and World Grand Prix, and some PDC players entered the BDO's World Masters. However, no player could compete in both versions of the world championship in the same season and players who reached the last-16 of the world championship could not play in the rival event the following season. Players who accumulated enough ranking points to qualify for both world championships could choose which one to play in.

To play in a BDO / WDF tournament, a player had to agree to comply with the rules of the 1997 Tomlin Order and remain eligible for the BDO World Masters and World Championship, which effectively meant not become a member of the PDPA. Players therefore usually had to choose whether to be affiliated to the PDC or the BDO and stay within the jurisdiction of that organisation. Players who reached the semi-finals of the BDO world championship were contractually obliged to appear at the event the following year. This condition was later violated when Raymond van Barneveld joined the PDC in 2006 shortly after appearing in the BDO world final. Mervyn King and Jelle Klaasen did the same in 2007, leading to threats of legal action by the BDO, and subsequently Ted Hankey followed suit in 2012.

In late 2001, the PDC offered all Professional Dart Players Association (PDPA) members a one-year contract to appear in the PDC's three televised major tournaments at the time: the World Championship, the World Matchplay and the World Grand Prix. Players who rejected the contract in order to compete in a different tournament would not be eligible to play in the remaining majors that year. It effectively meant that players who wished to play in the Matchplay and the Grand Prix would also have to commit to playing in the PDC World Championship rather than the BDO version. However, any player could apply for PDPA membership, and there would be no restrictions on entering other PDC events. Entry to most PDC majors is now restricted to members of the PDPA.

However, there are notable exceptions. PDPA Players Championships and Open events often allowed residents of the host country to participate regardless of being a PDPA member or not. This leads to anomalies such as Michael van Gerwen winning the PDC Open Holland in 2006 whilst being a BDO player at the time.

Another exception is made for major Dutch televised tournaments. They were previously staged under BDO / WDF qualification rules, but when the most famous Dutch player Raymond van Barneveld switched to the PDC, the tournament organisers insisted on inviting PDC players. An agreement was made with the BDO to allow a number of PDC wildcards for each event. Three more top Dutch players joined the PDC in January 2007 which added more confusion to player eligibility rules for these events. (see International Darts League and World Darts Trophy)

The Grand Slam of Darts (organised by the PDC) was the first major tournament staged in the United Kingdom to feature players from both sides of the darting divide. Inaugurated in 2007 it also featured a return to darts broadcasting for ITV and in 2008 was broadcast exclusively live on ITV4. Players who reached the latter stages of all the major PDC and BDO tournaments over a two-year period were invited, and all but one (the then BDO World Champion Martin Adams) accepted the invitation until 2015. Phil Taylor won the competition in 2007, 2008, 2009 and 2011. BDO member Scott Waites won the title in 2010.

== Standing of organisations ==
=== Early years ===
The first WDC world championship in 1994 featured most of the top ranked darts players, including seven former world champions. Paul Haigh of the Sunday Telegraph wrote: "All the current top men except [Mike] Gregory... are WDC and there's no getting away from that fact." The Independent agreed: "though the [BDO] event has much the greater pool of competitors, it is the [WDC event] which involves just about every darts player you have ever heard of." However, some of these players, such as Jocky Wilson and Eric Bristow, were considered past their prime by the 1990s. Olly Croft insisted that most of the WDC players were "has beens", though in response John Lowe pointed out that he had been world champion in 1993.

As BDO and PDC-affiliated players only faced each other infrequently, the strength and standing of the two organisations was ambiguous. Both organisations continued to claim that their world championship was the best version. The PDC was generally felt to have the best players, but prior to the end of the legal action in June 1997, few players were willing to defy BDO sanctions and play in WDC events, so they had to make up the numbers in their early tournaments with American players of varying quality and experience. The BDO boasted a much larger worldwide pool of players and also ran women's and amateur events. The BDO world championship was the older and more established event and as it was still shown on BBC, it could reach a wider audience than the Sky-televised PDC event.

Dan Waddell wrote: "for a number of years after the split and beyond, the issue of which code was the strongest and which World Championship was best was a source of passionate debate among darts and sports fans. In those first WDC worlds, there is no doubt they had the finer, more talented top eight, most of whom would have been seeded in a unified game. But where the BDO had the edge was in depth of talent: players who had qualified for the Embassy and were excellent performers in county and international darts, who made the tournament tougher than the WDC equivalent for the higher seeds". Ned Boulting also thought there was "genuine parity" between the codes for the first decade after the split, noting that while the PDC had some outstanding players, it lacked strength in numbers.

=== PDC vs BDO ===
Phil Taylor was generally regarded as the best player across both organisations in the 1990s and 2000s, and by some as the greatest darts player ever. In a special "Battle of the Champions" event in 1997, Taylor beat Richie Burnett, the 1995 BDO champion, 4–1 in sets. The same card featured a match between the respective 1994 champions, Dennis Priestley (PDC) and John Part (BDO). Priestley won 3–0 in sets. In a 1999 face-off dubbed "the match of the century", Taylor defeated Raymond van Barneveld, the 1998 and 1999 BDO champion, 21–10 in legs. In 2004, Taylor defeated Andy Fordham, the reigning BDO champion, in another challenge match broadcast on Sky Sports pay-per-view.

In 2005, Taylor and van Barneveld, both reigning world champions, met again in the cross-code Masters of Darts semi-finals; Taylor won 5–2 in sets. In the group stages of the same event, Taylor also beat Tony David, the 2002 BDO champion, 4–0 in sets, and beat Fordham 7–1 in the final. In 2006 and 2007, PDC players were invited to the BDO/WDF-run World Darts Trophy. Taylor won the 2006 event and lost in the 2007 final to Gary Anderson. At the 2007 International Darts League, Martin Adams, the reigning BDO champion, lost 6–2 to Adrian Lewis. The event was won by Anderson, who beat two players ranked in the PDC's top 12 en route.

The PDC's Grand Slam of Darts, established in 2007, was the first major darts tournament held in Britain to feature players from both the PDC and BDO. In the 2008 event Mark Webster, the reigning BDO champion, defeated PDC World Champion John Part 10–2 in legs in their second round match. The BDO's Scott Waites won the 2010 event and was runner-up to Taylor in the 2009 event. Waites was the only BDO representative to reach the Grand Slam final. When Waites played in the 2016 edition as reigning BDO champion, he lost all three group matches.

Players who moved from the BDO to the PDC enjoyed varied fortunes. In 2003, John Part, the 1994 BDO world champion, won the PDC world championship with a 7–6 final victory over Taylor, becoming the first player to win both versions of the world title after the split. Raymond van Barneveld became the second in 2007. Glen Durrant, three-time BDO world champion, won the Premier League in 2020. 2014 BDO world champion, Stephen Bunting, won the PDC Masters in 2024. However, other former Lakeside champions who switched codes had less success: Richie Burnett, Steve Beaton, Jelle Klaasen, Mark Webster, Christian Kist, Scott Mitchell and Ted Hankey all failed to win a major event in the PDC.

=== Widening gap and defections ===
In 2001, Barry Hearn became PDC chairman. Under Hearn's management, the PDC Pro Tour was established, and major televised tournaments such as the UK Open, the Las Vegas Desert Classic, the Grand Slam of Darts, the Masters and the Premier League were added to the circuit. Total prize money increased from £500,000 per year in 2001 to over £10 million per year in 2021. In 2002, the PDC world championship overtook the BDO event as the richest darts tournament in the world. By 2015, the PDC's world championship prize fund was £1.25 million, with £250,000 for the winner, compared with the BDO event's total prize fund of £339,000 with £100,000 for the winner. Hearn also introduced new eligibility rules, effectively meaning that players wishing to play in most major PDC events had to switch to the PDC.

Consequently, a large number of the BDO's top players, including most of its former champions, "defected" to the PDC, sometimes in contentious circumstances. John Part joined the PDC in 1997, becoming the first world champion after the split to switch codes. In 2001, six prominent BDO players, among them 1996 champion Steve Beaton, announced they would be playing in the PDC version of the world championship that year. In 2006, in what was described as a "massive coup", Raymond van Barneveld moved to the PDC. Van Barneveld said he was switching for the challenge and to "compete against the best players in the world, including the best, Phil Taylor." In 2007, another three top Dutch players - Jelle Klaasen, Michael van Gerwen and Vincent van der Voort - moved to the PDC. By 2015, the BDO was described as "mostly an unwilling feeder to the PDC: most of its biggest stars... jump ship given the chance." In January 2019, Glen Durrant switched to the PDC, shortly after winning his third consecutive BDO World Championship.

Meanwhile, the BDO stagnated and began to lose ground to the PDC; annual profits stood at £16,929 in 2008, compared with over £1 million for the PDC. They were the subject of a failed takeover bid by the PDC in 2009. In 2011, the BDO board were criticized by the membership in an open letter for lagging behind the PDC in terms of sponsorship, television coverage and new ideas. Its perceived lower standard of play was also the subject of derision from some quarters. In 2016, the BBC ended its coverage of the BDO World Championship, replacing it with a new PDC tournament, the Champions League of Darts.

Dan Waddell wrote in 2016:

The Great Darts War is now over. The PDC stands victorious. Their "brand" sells out arenas designed to host stadium-swallowing rock bands, they have the best players in the world under their banner and quickly attract the best newcomers from across the divide who see a chance to make money on the professional circuit. The BDO continues to do a fine job promoting amateur darts, but its professional game is lacklustre, kept afloat only by Bob Potter's largesse and some half-hearted BBC TV coverage. It's a dated, muted relic of the vibrant, raucous tournament it once was. The BDO try to offer their professionals and top-end players tournaments and opportunities to compete, but even they know the game is up and that the flow of talent to the PDC is a tide that can't be turned.

== PDC bid to take over BDO ==
On 21 October 2009, Barry Hearn made a bid of £1 million to purchase the BDO. The offer included a further £1 million for grassroots darts. It was the first time that a formal offer had been made public to end the 17-year split between the two organisations. However, later in the day, BDO founder Olly Croft rejected the proposal. A few months after the takeover offer and in the aftermath of the two organisations' 2010 World Championships, it was revealed and understood that the county organisations had asked the BDO board to consider the offer more seriously.

== BDO lifting of PDC restrictions ==
On 23 August 2018, under new chairman Des Jacklin, the BDO made the decision to modify their eligibility rules. All PDC tour card holders were now permitted to enter BDO events, with the rule changes coming into effect on 1 October of the same year. The decision was made to allow female players to enter the PDC Ladies play-offs (for two spots in the PDC World Championship) without the loss of status in the BDO. This rule change also allows all players that compete in the BDO to enter the PDC Q-School without penalty. The PDPA still retains all streaming/television restrictions on PDPA tour card holders in non-PDC sanctioned events.

== See also ==
- List of darts players who have switched organisation
- EuroLeague (Basketball)
- European Super League
- English Football League
- History of rugby league § The Schism in England
- LIV Golf
- Premier League
- Virginia Slims Circuit
- World Series Cricket
