= Cheerful Weather for the Wedding (film) =

- Theatrical release poster
- Directed by: Donald Rice
- Screenplay by: Donald Rice; Mary Henely-Magill
- Based on: Cheerful Weather for the Wedding by Julia Strachey
- Produced by: Teun Hilte
- Starring: Felicity Jones; Luke Treadaway; Elizabeth McGovern
- Cinematography: John Lee
- Edited by: Stephen Haren
- Music by: Michael Price
- Production companies: Goldcrest Films; Yellow Knife; BFI
- Distributed by: Universal Pictures
- Release date: 20 April 2012 (Tribeca)
- Running time: 93 minutes
- Country: United Kingdom
- Language: English
- Box office: $170,922

Cheerful Weather for the Wedding is a 2012 British comedy-drama film, directed by Donald Rice and starring Felicity Jones, Luke Treadaway, and Elizabeth McGovern. Adapted from the 1932 novella Cheerful Weather for the Wedding by Julia Strachey of the Bloomsbury Group, the film is about a young woman on her wedding day who worries that she's about to marry the wrong man, while both her fiancé and her former lover grow increasingly anxious about the event. The film premiered at the Tribeca Film Festival on 20 April 2012.

== Plot ==
Today is Dolly's (Felicity Jones) wedding day, and her family is arriving at the manor house with all the cheerfulness, chaos and petty grievances that bubble to the surface at such gatherings. Trouble soon appears with the arrival of Joseph (Luke Treadaway), Dolly's lover from the previous summer, who throws her feelings into turmoil. To her mother's (Elizabeth McGovern) exasperation, his presence threatens to upset the design she had for her daughter's future. For her part, Dolly just can't decide whether to run away with Joseph or to start a new life in Argentina with Owen (James Norton), the staid diplomat who is her husband to be.

== Cast ==
- Felicity Jones as Dolly Thatcham
- Luke Treadaway as Joseph Patten
- Elizabeth McGovern as Mrs. Thatcham
- Mackenzie Crook as David Daken
- Fenella Woolgar as Nancy Daken
- Eva Traynor as Annie
- Zoe Tapper as Evelyn Graham
- Paola Dionisotti as Mrs. Whitstable
- James Norton as Owen
- Sophie Stanton as Millman
- Elizabeth Webster as Betty
- Kenneth Collard as Whitstable
- Ellie Kendrick as Kitty Thatcham
- Ben Greaves-Neil as Jimmy Daken
- Luke Ward-Wilkinson as Robert
- Olly Alexander as Tom
- Joanna Hole as Miss Spoon
- John Standing as Horace Spigott
