= Thomas Tomlin, Baron Tomlin =

British judge (1867–1935)

The Right Honourable The Lord Tomlin PC
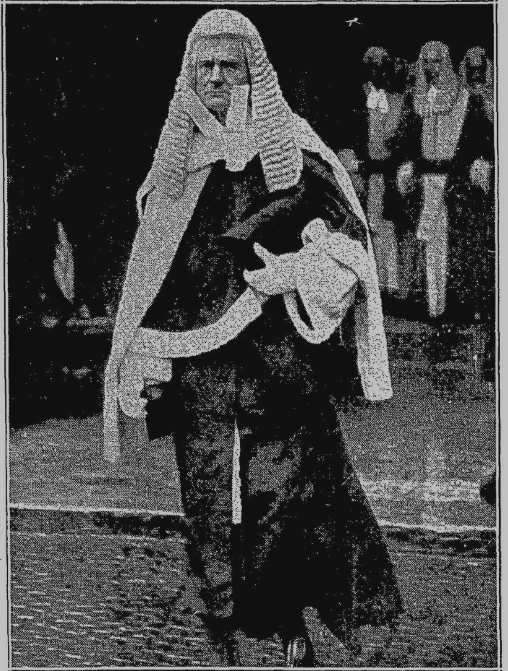
- Mr Justice Tomlin

Lord of Appeal in Ordinary
- In office 11 February 1929 – 13 August 1935

Judge of the High Court
- In office 1923 – 11 February 1929
- Preceded by: Sir Charles Sargant

Personal details
- Born: 6 May 1867 Canterbury, Kent
- Died: 12 August 1935 (aged 68) Canterbury, Kent
- Spouse: Marion Olivia Waterfield (m. 1893)
- Children: 5, including Stephen Tomlin
- Education: New College, Oxford

Thomas James Chesshyre Tomlin, Baron Tomlin, PC (6 May 1867 – 13 August 1935) was a British barrister and judge who served as lord of appeal in ordinary from 1929 until his death in 1935.

== Early life and career ==
Born in Canterbury, Kent, the son of a barrister, Tomlin was educated at Harrow School and New College, Oxford, where he obtained a first-class degree in jurisprudence and second-class honours in the BCL. He was called to the bar by the Middle Temple (1891) and ad eundem by Lincoln's Inn (1892). He was the pupil, then the devil, of Robert Parker, until the latter was appointed to the High Court in 1906; Tomlin, whose practice had until then been a moderate one, inherited most of Parker's practice.

Tomlin was junior equity counsel to the Board of Inland Revenue, the Board of Trade, the Commissioners of Woods and Forests, the Charity Commissioners, and the Board of Education. He took silk in 1913 and was elected a bencher of Lincoln's Inn in 1928

== Judicial career ==
In 1923, Tomlin was appointed as a judge to the Chancery Division of the High Court and received the customary knighthood. As a Chancery judge, he was responsible for the creation of the eponymous Tomlin order.

On 11 February 1929, he was appointed Lord of Appeal in Ordinary (without first serving on the Court of Appeal) and was created a life peer with the title Baron Tomlin, of Ash in the County of Kent, and was sworn into the Privy Council.

As Lord of Appeal in Ordinary, he is perhaps best remembered for his leading judgment in the Duke of Westminster's case concerning tax avoidance, in which he said:

Every man is entitled if he can to order his affairs so that the tax attaching under the appropriate Acts is less than it otherwise would be. If he succeeds in ordering them so as to secure this result, then, however unappreciative the Commissioners of Inland Revenue or his fellow tax-payers may be of his ingenuity, he cannot be compelled to pay an increased tax.

In addition to his judicial work, Tomlin served on a number of committees. He chaired the Royal Commission on Awards to Inventors between 1923 and 1933. He was also the chairman of the Child Adoption Committee, the University of London Commissioners, the Home Office advisory committee on the Cruelty to Animals Act, and the Royal Commission on the Civil Service.

== Personal life ==
He married Marion Olivia Waterfield in 1893; they had two daughters and three sons, the youngest of whom was the sculptor Stephen Tomlin.

== Important judgments ==
- Dashwood v Dashwood, [1927] WN 276, 64 LJNC 431, 71 Sol Jo 911
- Inland Revenue Commissioners v. Duke of Westminster [1936] AC 1

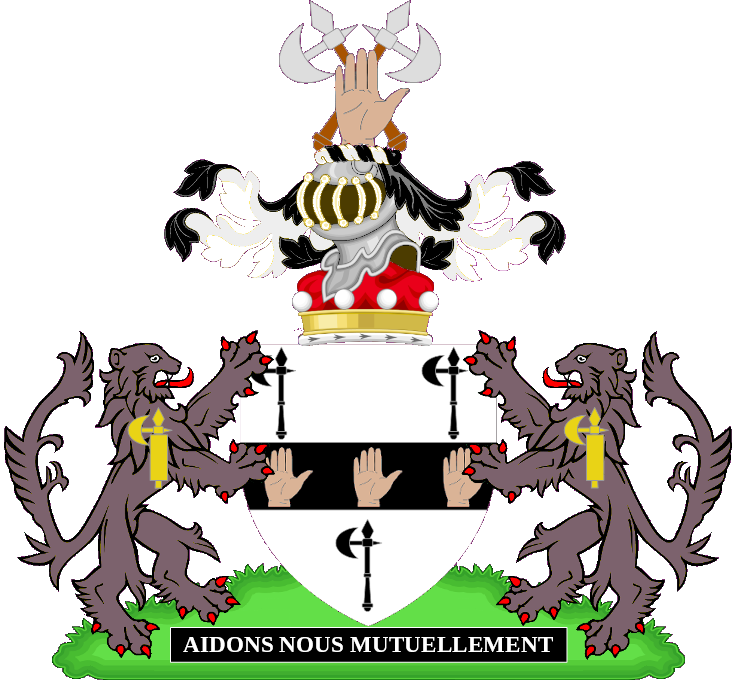
Arms, as displayed at Lincoln's Inn
