= Kevin Burrows =

English darts player

Personal information
- Born: 20 November 1964 (age 61) Ipswich, England

Sport
- Sport: Darts
- Playing since: 1989
- Darts: Target
- Laterality: Left-handed
- Walk-on music: "Fox on the Run" by The Sweet

Organisation (see split in darts)
- PDC: 1994–1996; 2002–2004

PDC premier events – best performances
- World Championship: Last 24 Group: 1994
- World Matchplay: Last 32: 1994, 1995

Kevin James Burrows (born 25 November 1964, in Ipswich, England) is an English former professional darts player who competed in Professional Darts Corporation (PDC) events.

== Career ==
Burrows began his darts career playing in several British Darts Organisation events in the late 1980s and early 1990s, reaching the finals of both the Denmark and Swedish Opens in 1989, losing to Eric Bristow in the latter. Following his last BDO/WDF event in 1991 at the Swiss Open, he resurfaced in darts in 1994, becoming one of the breakaway players that formed the new World Darts Council, later the Professional Darts Corporation. Burrows joined along with fellow 'rebel' Graeme Stoddart following the return of Mike Gregory and Chris Johns to the BDO. Burrows, along with Paul Lim, Richie Burnett, John Part, Alan Evans, and others, were banned from participating in World Darts Federation events.

While one source states Burrows 'qualified' for the WDC championship, no evidence of this qualification tournament has ever arisen. Regardless, Burrows is considered one of the original PDC 'founders', and therefore holds a PDC heritage number of 20. He first appeared at the 1994 WDC World Darts Championship and gained the dubious honour of losing both his group matches to Peter Evison and Jerry Umberger without winning a set. He thereafter became a mainstay of the WDC's early events, appearing twice in the PDC World Matchplay in 1994 and 1995, and competed in the WDC UK Matchplay in 1995 and 1996's short-lived WDC National Pro Dart League, and lost his matches on each occasion.

Following these appearances, Burrows vanished from the professional scene, although he did appear in the BDO again in 1999, and was still playing county darts as late as 2000. He played a single PDC Pro Tour event in 2002 and 2004, reaching the last 64 on both occasions.

Outside of darts, Burrows became a businessman in the Norfolk area, originally surrounding meat processing and packing, before becoming a pub landlord in 2023.

=== World Championship results ===
==== PDC ====
- 1994: Last 24 Group: (lost to Peter Evison and Jerry Umberger 0–3 (sets)

== See also ==
- Split in darts
