= Wash sale =

Sale and repurchase of a security

A wash sale is the sale of stock (or securities more generally) at a loss when substantially identical securities were acquired shortly before or after the date of sale. Wash sale regulations disallow most investors from using the value of a loss realized in a wash sale as a tax deduction.

In the United States, the Internal Revenue Code defines a wash sale as having occurred if securities were acquired within 30 days before or after the date of sale (a 61-day "window"). Wash sale rules can be thought of as a specific application of the doctrine of economic substance. That is, for an investor to receive the tax benefit of a realized capital loss, they must have changed their economic position in a "meaningful way". By specifying a 61-day period around the date of sale, the wash sale rule sets a baseline for determining if a certain pattern of securities transactions had economic substance or were instead primarily executed for the purpose of reducing taxes. In the absence of wash sale rules, an investor could sell a security at a loss and immediately repurchase it, leaving their economic position unchanged but providing them with a potential tax benefit.

Wash sales and similar trading patterns are not themselves prohibited; the rules only deal with the tax treatment of capital losses and the accounting of the ongoing tax basis. In most circumstances, tax rules in the U.S. and U.K. defer the tax benefits of losses disallowed due to wash sales. Such losses are typically added to the basis of the securities acquired in the wash sale period, essentially deferring the tax benefits until a non-wash sale occurs, if ever.

== Identification ==
In the United States, wash sale laws are codified in "26 USC § 1091 - Loss from wash sales of stock or securities". The corresponding treasury regulations are given by CFR 1.1091-1 and 1.1091-2.

IRS Publication 550 provides a practical interpretation of these laws for purposes of preparing federal income taxes. According to the publication, a wash sale occurs when a taxpayer sells stock or securities at a loss, and within 30 days before or after the sale:

1. Buys substantially identical stock or securities,
2. Acquires substantially identical stock or securities in a fully taxable trade,
3. Acquires a contract or option to buy substantially identical stock or securities, or
4. Acquires substantially identical stock for an individual retirement account (IRA).

If an investor sells stock and their spouse or a corporation they control buys substantially identical stock, they also have a wash sale.

Example: An investor buys 100 shares of X stock for $1,000. They sell these shares for $750 and within 30 days from the sale they buy 100 shares of the same stock for $800. Because they bought substantially identical stock, they cannot deduct their loss of $250 on the sale.

=== Substantially Identical ===
There is no formal definition of "substantially identical", however there is guidance and precedent. Ordinarily, stocks or securities of one corporation are not considered substantially identical to stocks or securities of another corporation. However, they may be substantially identical in some cases. For example, in a reorganization, the stocks and securities of the predecessor and successor corporations may be substantially identical. Securities issued by the same issuer but with different share classes and/or traded on different exchanges (e.g. ADRs) are generally considered to be substantially identical.

== Consequences ==
In the United States, if a loss was disallowed because of the wash sale rules, the value of the disallowed loss is added to the cost basis of the new stock or securities ("replacement shares") except in case 4 above.

In case 4 (replacement shares purchased in an IRA) the loss is permanently disallowed. In contrast, in cases 1-3 the value of the loss is only postponed until the disposition of the replacement shares. Your holding period for the replacement shares includes the holding period of the stock or securities sold.

In the example above, the investor adds the disallowed loss of $250 to the cost of the new stock, $800, to obtain their basis in the new stock, which is $1,050.

=== Inconsequential Wash Sales ===
When selling shares with different purchase dates, custodians may report a wash sale even if there are no replacement shares within the wash sale window. However, this wash sale has no effect on an investor's tax position.

For example, an investor purchases 100 shares of stock on February 1 for $40 per share, and 100 shares on March 1 for $45 per share. The investor then sells all (200) shares on March 10 for $35.

If the custodian records the sale of 100 shares acquired on February 1 before recording the sale of the 100 shares acquired on March 1, they will report the sale as a wash sale, record disallowed losses of $5 per share, and adjust the cost basis of the shares acquired on March 1 from $45 per share to $50 per share.

However, because all 200 shares are being sold, upon subsequently recording the sale of the shares purchased on March 1, there will be no additional replacement shares purchased within the wash sale window. With an adjusted cost basis of $50 per share, the realized loss is $15 per share for 100 shares or $1,500. Thus, the investor receives the full value of the loss as if there were no wash sale. The custodian will report disallowed losses of $500 and total realized losses of $2,000 ($500 of which is disallowed) leaving the investor with a realized loss for tax purposes of $1,500.

=== Reporting ===
Reporting wash sales is done on form 1099-B. According to Forbes, "most brokers don't report wash sale (WS) loss calculations during the year". For the IRS, taxpayers in the United States must calculate their WS losses "across all taxpayer's brokerage accounts, including IRAs and spousal accounts if married/filing joint.

== See also ==
- Ex-dividend date, where favorable tax treatment of qualified dividends is contingent on a 60-day holding period, similar to the wash sale rules.
- Round-tripping, a type of accounting fraud practiced through asset swapping, resembling wash sales within a group of participants.
- Tax loss harvesting, an investment strategy that attempts to realize capital losses within the constraints imposed by wash sale rules.
