= Olly Croft =

British darts administrator (1929–2019)

Oliver Croft
- Born: Oliver Albert Croft; 17 November 1929
- Died: 23 November 2019 (aged 90)
- Years active: 1973–2011
- Spouse: Lorna Croft (died 2003)

Oliver Albert Croft, OBE (17 November 1929 – 23 November 2019) was a British darts administrator and the founder of the British Darts Organisation (BDO). He was one of the most influential protagonists in darts for almost four decades, having set up and run the BDO from its inception in 1973 until he was voted off the board in August 2011.

Prior to the formation of the BDO, the major organisation for county darts had been the National Darts Association of Great Britain (the NDAGB, commonly referred to as NDA) which had been formed in London on 25 September 1954. Croft began playing darts himself in 1961 for the Harringay Arms in Crouch Hill and was soon playing seven nights per week.

== Early life ==
Croft was born on 17 November 1929 to the North London tiler Oliver Croft and his wife May Gladys (née Robinson), who later died while giving birth to his younger brother. His father remarried and his son was rebellious towards his stepmother. She beat Croft and locked him in the home cupboard under the stairs in response. The children were subsequently evacuated when the Second World War broke out. After Croft did his national service as an electrician for the Royal Air Force, he established a kitchen tile company called Croft Brothers, which had two shops in Muswell Hill and Bushey Heath, Hertfordshire, and generated £2 million in income.

== BDO formation ==
The British Darts Organisation was formed at its inaugural meeting at Croft's home in Creighton Avenue, Muswell Hill in North London on 7 January 1973. Twelve others attended that meeting including his wife Lorna, Sam Hawkins, Jim Sweeney and James Rogers. They agreed to start an inter-county league that autumn and instead of working within the NDA decided to go it alone.

After the British Darts Organisation separated from the NDA in 1973, he said, "We have 61 counties, our links with television and the big sponsors. Our ultimate aim? I think it is a headquarters where we can hold big finals... But I can't see that in our lifetime."

There are now 66 counties providing competitive darts for men, women and youth, backed up with internal county Super Leagues.

Croft also affiliated the British Darts Organisation as a founder member of the World Darts Federation which set up the World Cup and Europe Cup.

== Darts boom and bust ==
With the creation of the Winmau World Masters in 1974 and World Professional Darts Championship in 1978, darts began to become increasingly popular, appearing on BBC television and ITV, usually on their World of Sport show. But as the mid-to-late eighties approached and World of Sport was cancelled, the image of the game collapsed. Some top players became frustrated at lack of opportunities, and Croft would become a central character in a devastating split in the game.

== Acrimonious split ==
In 1993 the top players left the British Darts Organisation and formed the World Darts Council (which is now the Professional Darts Corporation, PDC), but Croft and his organisation proceeded to ban the rebel players from playing County Darts. Croft - who was a salaried BDO official and lived rent-free in a BDO-owned property - was quoted as saying, "I don't owe any dart players a kidney stone". The acrimony ended up in court in an expensive proceeding that neither side could really afford - either financially or for the good of the game. The two sides eventually came to an agreement in 1997 via a Tomlin Order, but there was still division, rivalry and often animosity between the two organisations.

== After the split ==
Croft asserted that his British Darts Organisation set-up was for the good of all players and not just a select few. Many of the players that made their way through the county system joined the PDC as their tournaments offer higher prize money and more chance of making a full-time living from the game.

Passionate debate often raged amongst darts fans as to the relative merits of the BDO and PDC, and Croft's role in the split in the game. He pioneered a system of county darts which still produces top players and in many respects built the game's foundation in the 1970s and 1980s. But criticism for the fact that there are now two Organisations and thus no unified World Championship is equally rife.

Mike Watterson, the sports promoter who created the Embassy World Professional Championship (and arranged the TV and sponsorship deals), was one of Croft's biggest critics.

== Voted off board ==
On 7 August 2011, Croft was voted off the BDO board at their AGM ending 38 years as the main figurehead of the Organisation. It also brought to an end his role as tournament director for the BDO as Wayne Williams succeeded him. Despite losing power over the BDO in 2011, Croft continued to be the Chief Technical Advisor at the WDF.

Olly Croft died on 23 November 2019, shortly after his 90th birthday. Olly's wife, Lorna, had died in June 2003, aged 72. They were survived by two sons and a daughter.
