= Stephen Tomlin =

British artist & sculptor (1901-1937)

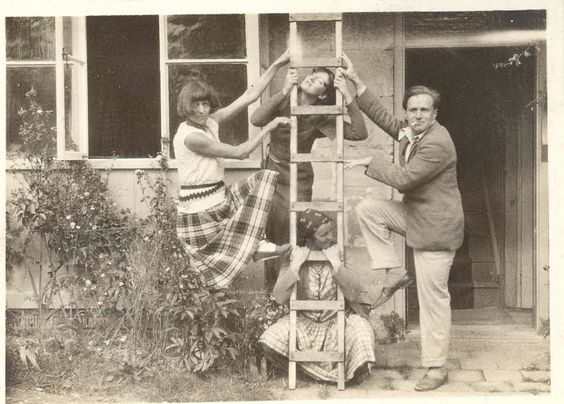
- Tomlin poses with his lover Dora Carrington in the 1920s
- Born: Stephen Tomlin; 2 March 1901; London, United Kingdom of Great Britain and Ireland
- Died: 5 January 1937 (aged 35); Royal Victoria Hospital, Bournemouth, Hampshire
- Education: New College, Oxford
- Occupations: artist, sculptor
- Spouse: Julia Strachey (m. 1927; sep. 1934)
- Father: Thomas Tomlin
- Notable work: Bust of Virginia Woolf, bust of Lytton Strachey

Stephen Tomlin (2 March 1901 – 5 January 1937) was a British artist associated with the Bloomsbury Set. He was the youngest son of the judge and law lord Thomas, Lord Tomlin of Ash.

== Life ==
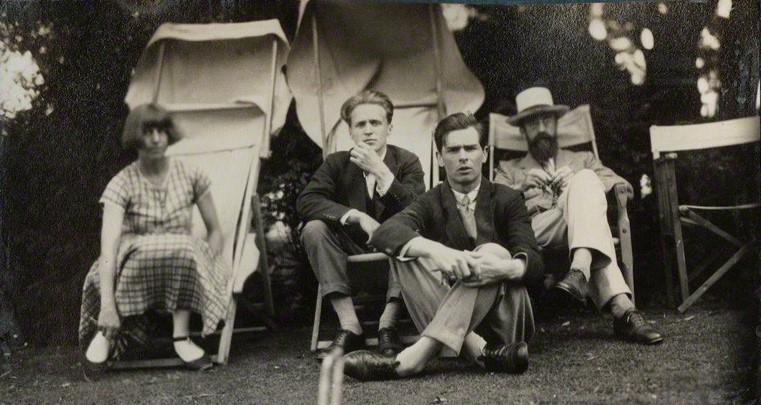
Lady Ottoline Morrell (1873–1938), vintage snapshot print/NPG Ax142600. Dora Carrington; Stephen Tomlin; Walter John Herbert ('Sebastian') Sprott; Lytton Strachey, June 1926

Tomlin studied classics at New College, Oxford from January 1919. However, he suffered a nervous breakdown following the death of a fellow student and left after two terms. He then became a pupil of Frank Dobson and later established a career as a portrait sculptor.

Tomlin's circle of friends, and sitters for portraits, included many members of the Bloomsbury Group, particularly second generation members like Francis Birrell and David Garnett.

Tomlin was bisexual and had affairs with a number of members of the Bloomsbury set including Henrietta Bingham and Dora Carrington. In 1927 he married Julia Strachey, niece of Lytton Strachey. His relationships with men are less well attested, probably due to the necessity of concealing homosexual activity which was at that time illegal in the United Kingdom under the Criminal Law Amendment Act.

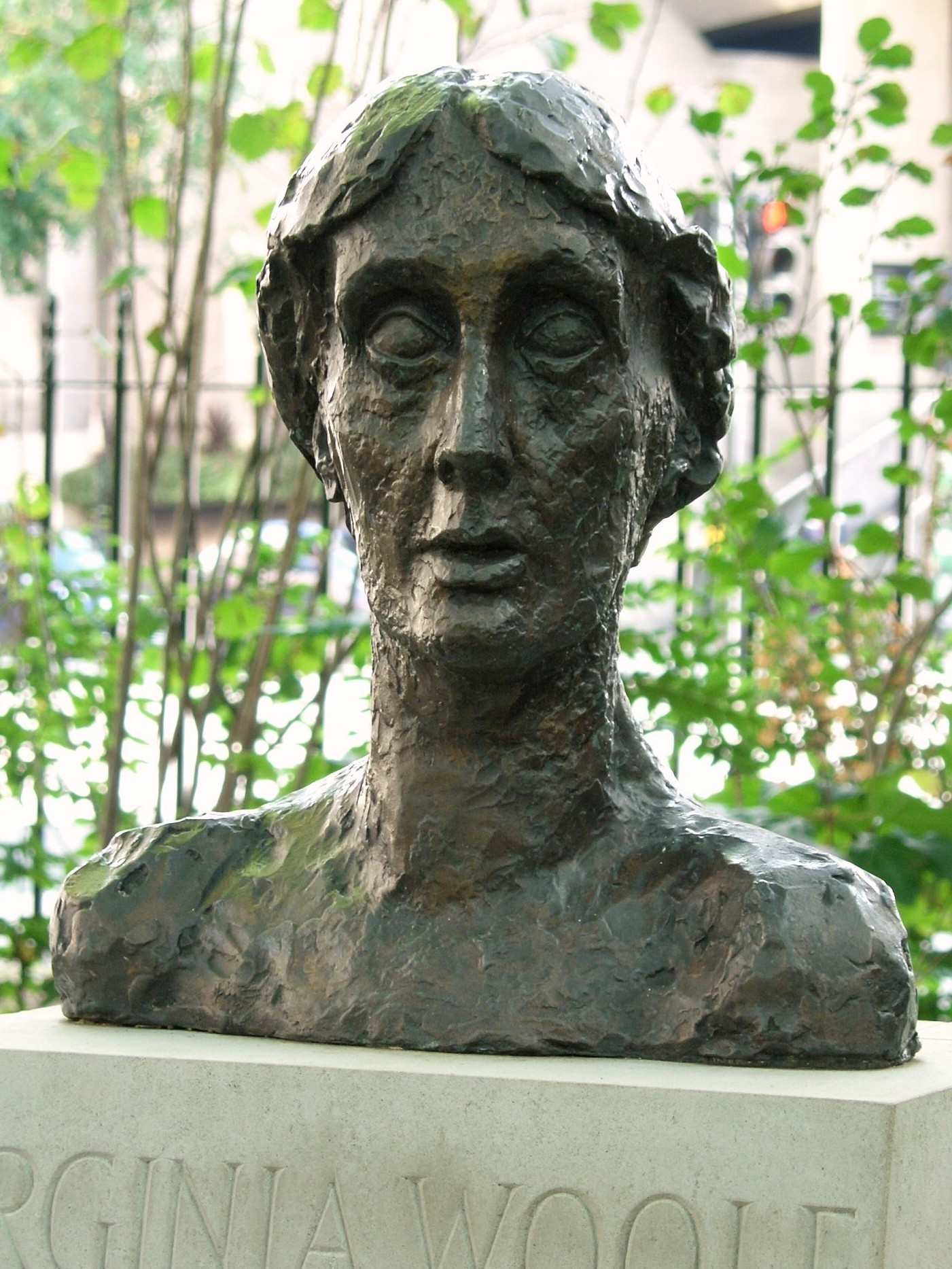
Bust of Virginia Woolf in Tavistock Square, Bloomsbury, by Stephen Tomlin

One of Tomlin's boyfriends, known as 'H', also had a relationship with the artist Duncan Grant. 'H' worked in the drapery department at the now defunct Jones Brothers’ department store on the Holloway Road. When he and Tomlin visited Lytton Strachey at Ham Spray in the 1930s, 'H' was obliged to sleep downstairs with the servants.

Tomlin co-founded The Cranium dining club with David Garnett, another member of the Bloomsbury Group; the club met every month to exchange ideas.

Tomlin died in 1937 at the Royal Victoria Hospital, Boscombe, Hampshire.

== Collections ==
Correspondence between Tomlin and his wife Julia Strachey is held as part of the Strachey Papers at University College London.
