= WDC UK Masters =

Darts tournament

UK Masters
- Sport: Darts
- Founded: 1992
- Folded: 1994
- Country: England
- Venues: Norwich (1992-93); Bury St. Edmunds (1994)
- Last champion: (England) Phil Taylor (1994)
- Tournament format: Legs; Equal darts

The WDC UK Masters, also known as the Lada UK Masters, was a professional darts tournament held from 1992 to 1994. It is notable for being the first tournament staged by the World Darts Council, which later became the Professional Darts Corporation, without any involvement from the sport's governing body, the British Darts Organisation, and was thus another important step towards the eventual split in darts.

The tournament was sponsored by car manufacturer Lada and broadcast on Anglia Television. It used the "equal darts" format, whereby once a winning double was hit, the other player would have the opportunity to tie the leg by finishing in the same number of darts. Two of the three events were won by Mike Gregory, who later caused controversy by leaving the WDC and re-joining the BDO. The final event was won by Phil Taylor.

== Overview ==
Darts had experienced a boom in the 1980s, with some 23 televised events in 1983, but this had steadily diminished to just one by 1989. The reduction in sponsorship, prizemoney and television exposure meant that players who had turned professional during the boom years were no longer able to make a living from darts. They also felt that the BDO was not doing enough to reverse the situation, so a group of top players, their managers and darts equipment manufacturers formed the World Darts Council in 1992, with the aim of improving the game's image and attracting new sponsorship and television deals. The WDC began organising their own events, and the first of these was the Lada UK Masters, to be held in Norwich's Talk of the Town and broadcast on regional Anglia Television.

The event was first held from 9–11 October 1992. 15 WDC players, comprising most of the world's top players (John Lowe, Rod Harrington, Alan Warriner, Peter Evison, Bob Anderson, Cliff Lazarenko, Ritchie Gardner, Kevin Spiolek, Phil Taylor, Dennis Priestley, Jamie Harvey, Eric Bristow, Jocky Wilson, Keith Deller and Mike Gregory), participated along with qualifier Paul Hartshorn. The event was won by Mike Gregory, who defeated Dennis Priestley 8–5 in the final. Dick Allix, who helped organise the tournament, said afterwards: “The event has proved hugely successful and shown that the WDC can successfully stage and run a major international tournament for the professionals. This is the start of the rejuvenation of professional darts on television.”

Shortly afterwards, in January 1993, the rift between the BDO and the WDC became permanent when the BDO banned the rebel players from darts competitions worldwide, resulting in a bitter four-year legal battle.

The UK Masters was staged twice more. The 1993 event was also won by Gregory, who caused controversy weeks later when he announced that he was leaving the WDC and returning to the BDO. The 1994 edition was sponsored by Greene King and expanded to 32 players. It was won by Phil Taylor, who whitewashed Kevin Spiolek 8–0 in the final.

A different darts tournament with the same name was held as part of the PDC European Tour in 2013 in Minehead. John Part won the event, beating Stuart Kellett 6–4 in the final.

== Finals ==
Year	Winner	Score	Runner up	Total prize fund	Winner's share
1992	(England) Mike Gregory	8–5 (legs)	(England) Dennis Priestley	£23,000	£5,000
1993	(England) Mike Gregory	8–6	(England) Bob Anderson	£23,000	£5,000
1994	(England) Phil Taylor	8–0	(England) Kevin Spiolek	£23,000	£5,000

== See also ==
Split in darts
