= Julia Strachey =

British writer (1901–1979)

- Julia Strachey at San Gimignano, 1922
- Born: Julia Frances Strachey; 20 August 1901; Allahabad, India
- Died: 1979; United Kingdom
- Occupations: novelist, photographer, model
- Spouses: Stephen Tomlin (1927–34), Lawrence Gowing (1945-67)
- Writing career
- Notable works: Cheerful Weather for the Wedding, The Man on the Pier, An Integrated Man

Julia Strachey (14 August 1901 – 1979) was an English writer, born in Allahabad, India, where her father, Oliver Strachey, the elder brother of Lytton Strachey, was a civil servant. Her mother, Ruby Mayer (1881–1959), was of Swiss-German origin. For most of Julia's life she lived in England, where she worked as a model at Poiret, as a photographer and as a publisher's reader, before she embarked upon a career in novel-writing. She is perhaps best remembered for her novella Cheerful Weather for the Wedding.

== Early life ==
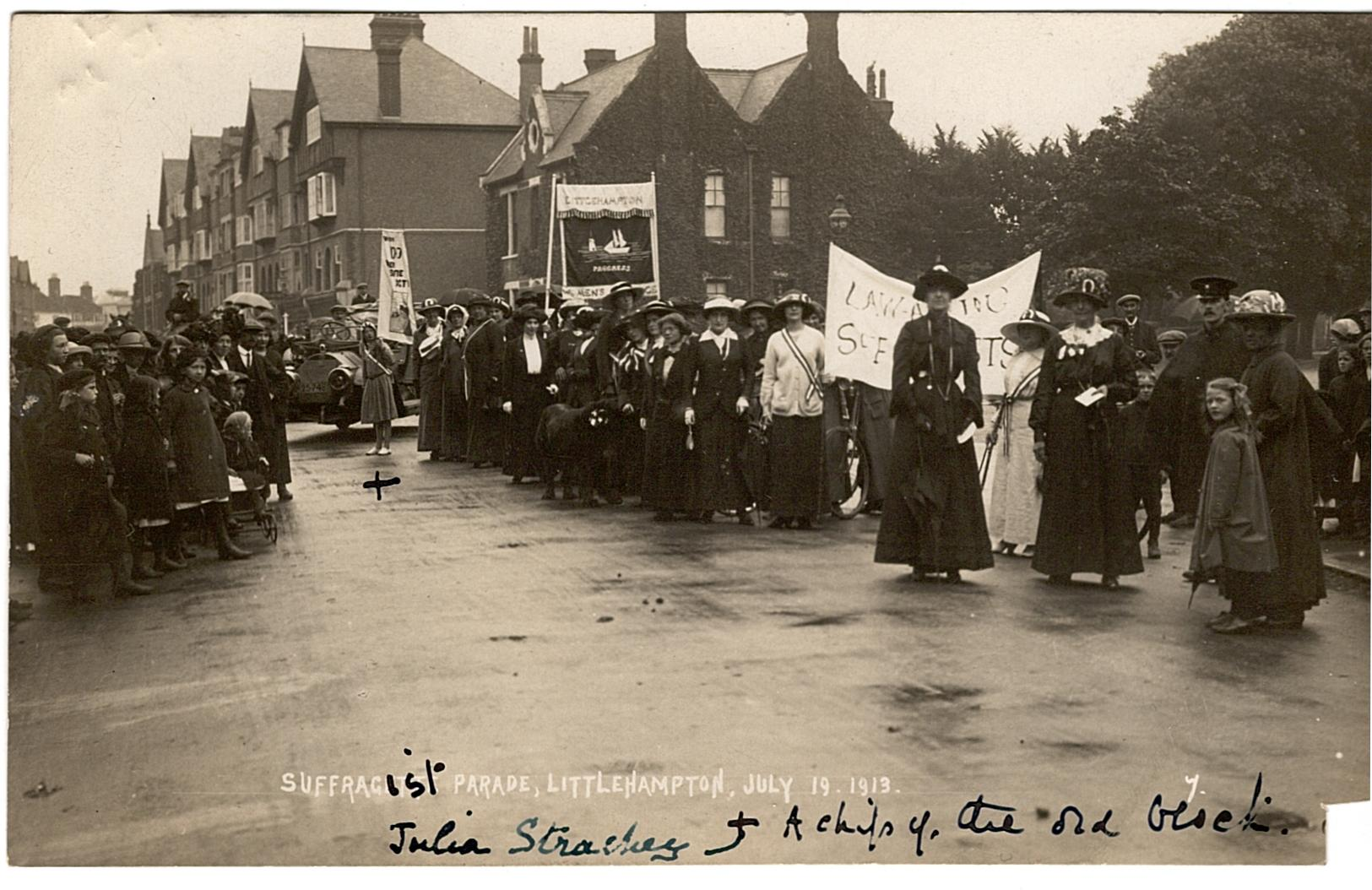
A young Julia Strachey in 1913 at the suffrage parade in Littlehampton

Julia Strachey was born in Allahabad, India on 14 August 1901 to Ruby (née Mayer) and Oliver Strachey following their marriage in January 1901. She spent the first six years of her life in India where she had a pet dog called Joseph, before travelling to London.

After her parents' divorce, she moved in with her aunt Elinor Rendel in Melbury Road, off Kensington High Street. Four years later, Julia was sent to Brackenhurst boarding school; and it was during this time that Oliver Strachey began a new romance with Rendel's close friend Ray Costelloe, the niece of Alys Pearsall Smith, then the wife of the British philosopher Bertrand Russell. Julia in turn developed an intimate friendship with Alys, whom she affectionately referred to as 'Aunty Loo'. Smith's unusual and often wicked sense of humour was to have a lasting effect on Julia's literary style. From 1913-1918 Julia attended Bedales School

== Bloomsbury and beyond ==
In 1932 the eccentric and witty Cheerful Weather for the Wedding was published by the Hogarth Press. Virginia Woolf wrote: 'I think it astonishingly good - complete and sharp and individual.' Both through the connections of her uncle Lytton, and the name she made for herself through her writing, Julia soon became integrated into the Bloomsbury Group, frequenting many of its social events. These unique experiences had a strong influence on her fiction. Until 1964, Julia was also an avid member of Bloomsbury's Memoir Club, where she and its other members discussed and wrote about their shared memories.

In 1927 Julia married the sculptor Stephen Tomlin, who created busts of Lytton Strachey and Virginia Woolf. They separated in 1934. During this period, Julia made a living by writing short stories for magazines. It was also the beginning of her novel-writing career. In 1939, she met the artist (and later critic) Lawrence Gowing, who was, at the time, only 21 years old. The couple went on to spend thirty years together, fifteen of them married, in Newcastle and in Chelsea, before Gowing fell in love with another woman.

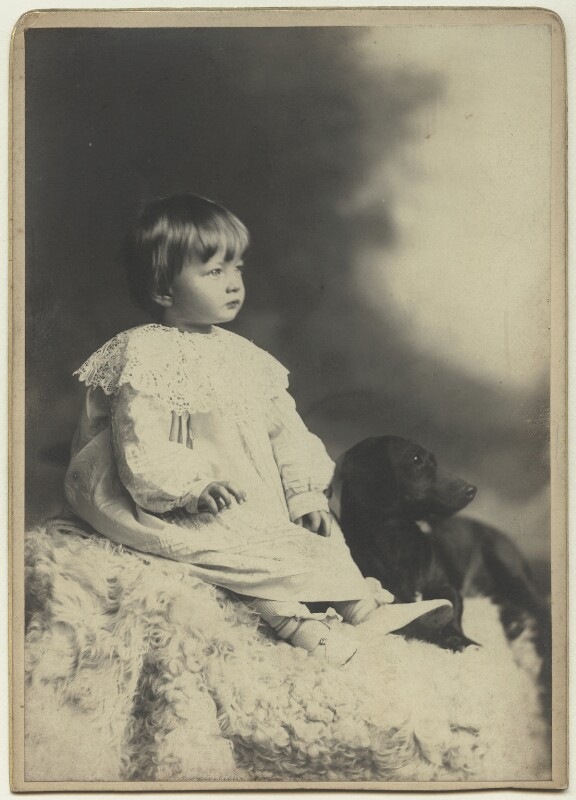
Julia Frances Strachey and Joseph August 1902 by Thomas D. Winter NPG x13098

Strachey died in 1979 after a long illness.

== Published works ==
- Cheerful Weather for the Wedding (1932), reprinted by Persephone Books in 2009
- 'Fragments of a Diary' (1940)
- 'Pioneer City' (1943)
- The Man on the Pier (1951), reprinted by Penguin in 1978 under the title An Integrated Man
- 'Animalia', published by the New Yorker under the title 'Can't you get me out of here?' (1959)
- 'Complements of the season', short story published in Turnstile One, edited by V. S. Pritchett. Published by Turnstile Press. (1948)

== Collections ==
Julia Strachey's papers are held at University College London, primarily donated by Gowing; the collection includes extensive personal correspondence, personalia, and notebooks and diaries. Gowing's daughter also donated his personal archive to University College London in 2018 and 2023. The archive includes correspondence relating to Gowing's work, lecture notes, and personal papers.

Letters between Strachey and other members of the Bloomsbury Group (including Vanessa Bell, Quentin Bell, and Leonard Woolf) can be found at the University of Sussex.

== See also ==
- List of Bloomsbury Group people

== Sources ==
- Julia - A Portrait of Julia Strachey by Herself and Frances Partridge, Frances Partridge (Gollancz: London, 1983)
- Preface to Cheerful Weather for the Wedding, Frances Partridge (Persephone Books, London: 2009)
