= Duke of Westminster's Case =

British criminal case

The Duke of Westminster's case was an often cited case in tax avoidance. The full title and citation was Inland Revenue Commissioners v. Duke of Westminster [1936] A.C. 1; 19 TC 490.

The Duke of Westminster used to employ a gardener and pay him from his post-tax income, which was substantial. To reduce tax, the Duke stopped paying the gardener's wage and instead drew up a covenant, agreeing to pay an equivalent amount at the end of every specified period. Under the tax laws of the time, this allowed the Duke to claim the expense as a deduction, thus reducing his taxable income and his liability towards income tax and surtax.

The Inland Revenue challenged this arrangement as tantamounting to tax evasion and took the Duke to court. They however lost their case. The judge, Lord Tomlin, famously said:

Every man is entitled, if he can, to order his affairs so that the tax attaching under the appropriate Acts is less than it otherwise would be. If he succeeds in ordering them so as to secure this result, then, however unappreciative the Commissioners of Inland Revenue or his fellow tax-payers may be of his ingenuity, he cannot be compelled to pay an increased tax.

Although this ruling was attractive for others seeking to avoid tax legally by creating complex structures, it has since been weakened by subsequent cases where the courts have looked at the overall effect. An example of the courts' later, more restrictive approach was the Ramsay principle where, if a transaction had pre-arranged artificial steps that served no commercial purpose other than to save tax, the proper approach was to tax the effect of the transaction as a whole.
