= Cheerful Weather for the Wedding =

1932 novella by Julia Strachey

- First edition
- Author: Julia Strachey
- Cover artist: Harold Knight
- Language: English
- Published: 1932 Hogarth Press
- Publication place: United Kingdom
- Media type: Print (Softback)
- OCLC: 317752267

Cheerful Weather for the Wedding (1932) is a novella by Julia Strachey. Published by the Hogarth Press in 1932, it tells the story of a brisk March day in England, somewhere on the Dorset coast, during which Dolly is due to marry the Honourable Owen Bigham. Waylaid by the disheartened admirer who failed to win her over while he still could, a distant and detached mother, and her own sense of foreboding, Dolly turns to a bottle of rum in the hope of reaching the altar.

After the edition published by Leonard and Virginia Woolf in 1932, Strachey's work was neglected until 1978 when Penguin Books produced a new edition which incorporates both Cheerful Weather for the Wedding and An Integrated Man. In 2002, Persephone Books revived it once again, and in 2009 republished it as a Persephone Modern Classic.
