= Tomlin order =

English court order

A Tomlin order is a court order in the English civil justice system under which a court action is stayed on terms that have been agreed in advance between the parties and are included in a schedule to the order. As such, it is a form of consent order. The Tomlin order permits either party to apply to court to enforce the terms of the order, which avoids the need to start fresh proceedings. The terms of the schedule do not form part of the court order and so may remain confidential, and they may include matters outside the jurisdiction of the court or the scope of the case in hand.

== Origins ==
The order is named after High Court judge Thomas Tomlin (as he then was) from his ruling in Dashwood v Dashwood, that such an order kept the proceedings alive only to the extent necessary to enable a party to enforce the terms of the settlement. In that case, Tomlin held that a provision in the order which required one party to refrain from running a business in competition with the other party could not be enforced unless and until the court made an order for specific performance or for an injunction. Thus, any provisions in a Tomlin order which require action by the court, such as releasing funds held in court, or an order for costs, must be included in the body of the order, not the schedule. Until a second order has been sought, it is not possible to apply to commit the party in breach for contempt of court.

The following day, Tomlin issued a practice note which set out a preferred form for such orders. A similar form of order subsequently appeared in the Rules of the Supreme Court, and now appears in the Civil Procedure Rules. The form of the schedule is settled between the parties.

== Application ==
The order has seen significant use in the settlement of personal injury litigation, although there has been debate as to whether that is the best option. It is neither necessary nor appropriate where the settlement simply involves the payment of money. More appropriate uses can be observed in commercial litigation, such as:

1. when terms are agreed without admission of liability;
2. where the terms are complicated or go beyond what the court has jurisdiction to order; or
3. where the parties have agreed that certain terms will remain confidential.

The Tomlin order will contain the orders that the parties would like the court to make, such as staying the proceedings, making relevant orders for costs and granting permission to apply. The other settlement terms will be contained in the schedule to the order.

In any subsequent application to the court, there will be jurisdiction to vary only the order itself but not what appears in the schedule, which has been characterized by Lord Steyn as being in effect a commercial agreement. It can be attacked only if it is subsequently discovered that the settlement was obtained by way of fraud. Where fraud was initially alleged to have occurred earlier in the proceedings, but a settlement was subsequently reached and incorporated into an order, the matter cannot be reopened later on if "better evidence of the fraud came to light than was available when the settlement contract was made."
