= Capital loss =

Difference between a lower selling price and a higher purchase price

Capital loss is the difference between a lower selling price and a higher purchase price or cost price of an eligible Capital asset, which typically represents a financial loss for the seller. This is distinct from losses from selling goods below cost, which is typically considered loss in business income.

== United States ==
The IRS states that "If your capital losses exceed your capital gains, the excess can be deducted on your tax return." Limits on such deductions apply. For individuals, a net loss can be claimed as a tax deduction against ordinary income, up to $3,000 per year ($1,500 in the case of a married individual filing separately). Any remaining net loss can be carried over and applied against gains in future years. However, losses from the sale of personal property, including a residence, do not qualify for this treatment.

Special wash sale rules apply if the same or substantially similar asset is bought, acquired, or optioned within 30 days before or after the sale.

According to 26 U.S.C. §121, a capital loss on the sale of a primary residence is generally tax-exempt.. IRC 165(c) is a stronger source that limits the loss on the sale of a personal residence. IRC 121 is for exclusion of gain of primary residence and does not talk about loss.
